= List of Williams College people =

Williams College
- Motto: E liberalitate E. Williams, armigeri
- Motto in English: "Through the Generosity of E. Williams, Esquire"
- Type: Private
- Established: 1793 (233 years ago)
- Endowment: $4.23 billion (2021)
- President: Maud Mandel
- Administrative staff: 319 (fall 2021)
- Undergraduates: 1,987 (fall 2021)
- Postgraduates: 25 (fall 2021)
- Location: Williamstown, Massachusetts, United States
- Campus: Rural, college town; total 450 acres
- Athletics: Ephs
- Mascot: The Purple Cow
- Website: www.williams.edu

Williams College is a private liberal arts college in Williamstown, Massachusetts, United States. It was established in 1793 with funds from the estate of Ephraim Williams, a colonist from the Province of Massachusetts Bay who was killed in the French and Indian War in 1755. Notable alumni of the college are listed below.

== Academia ==
A–F

- Brooke Ackerly 1988, political scientist and professor of Political Science at Vanderbilt University
- Peter Adamson 1994, professor of late ancient and Arabic philosophy at LMU Munich
- Lawrence A. Alexander 1965, Warren Distinguished Professor of constitutional law at University of San Diego
- Robert Z. Aliber 1952, professor emeritus of international economics and finance at the University of Chicago
- Robert S. Anderson 1974, geomorphologist at the Institute of Arctic and Alpine Research, Fellow of the American Geophysical Union, and distinguished professor at University of Colorado Boulder
- W. H. Locke Anderson 1955, economist and professor at the University of Michigan; staff economist for the Council of Economic Advisers
- Albert LeRoy Andrews 1899, professor of Germanic philology and an avocational bryologist at Cornell University
- Richard T. Antoun 1953, anthropologist specializing in Islamic and Middle Eastern studies who was murdered in 2009 by a graduate student at Binghamton University
- Jonathan Arons 1965, astrophysicist and fellow of the American Physical Society; professor emeritus of Astronomy and Physics at University of California, Berkeley
- Bernard Bailyn 1945, two-time Pulitzer-prize-winning early American historian and professor at Harvard University
- Michel Balinski 1954, known for Balinski's theorem; mathematician and economist, winner of the John von Neumann Theory Prize and Lanchester Prize
- Sally Ball 1990, poet, editor, and professor; instructor at Arizona State University
- Emily Balskus 2002, chemist and microbiologist; Morris Kahn Associate Professor at Harvard University
- Edward Bartow 1892, professor of chemistry at the University of Iowa; expert on sanitary chemistry
- John Bascom 1849, Williams professor and president of the University of Wisconsin–Madison; namesake of Williams' Bascom House and Bascom Lodge atop Mount Greylock
- Amanda Bayer 1981, economics professor at Swarthmore College
- James Phinney Baxter III 1914, president of Williams College 1937–1961 and winner of the Pulitzer Prize for History in 1947; namesake of Williams' Baxter Fellow residential program
- Bruce Beehler 1974, ornithologist and conservationist at the Smithsonian Institute's Museum of Natural History
- Jere Behrman 1962, William R. Kenan Jr. professor of economics at the University of Pennsylvania
- David Bellinger 1971, professor of neurology at Harvard Medical School and professor in the Department of Environmental Health at Harvard School of Public Health
- Nathan S. S. Beman 1824, fourth president of Rensselaer Polytechnic Institute
- Jonathan Berkey 1981, historian and professor of history at Davidson College
- Michael Beschloss 1977, called "the nation's leading presidential historian" by Newsweek
- Norman Birnbaum 1947, sociologist and emeritus professor at the Georgetown University Law Center
- Daniel I. Bolnick 1996, professor at the University of Connecticut
- Kimberly D. Bowes 1992, professor of Classical Studies at the University of Pennsylvania
- Julian Charles Boyd 1952, linguist
- Richard M. Brett 1925, conservationist and author
- Sterling Allen Brown 1922, teacher, literary critic, and poet
- Harry Gunnison Brown 1904, professor of economics at Yale University; pioneer in the development of mathematical economics and econometrics
- James MacGregor Burns 1939, Pulitzer Prize–winning author
- John C. Campbell 1892, president of Piedmont College, inspiration for John C. Campbell Folk School
- James Hulme Canfield 1869, chancellor of the University of Nebraska, founder of the American Library Institute
- Colin Cannonier 2005, professor of economics at Belmont University; notable sportsman in club soccer and cricket
- Franklin Carter 1862, professor of Germanic and Romance Languages; president of Williams College 1881–1901
- Paul Chadbourne 1848, president of University of Wisconsin, Williams College, and University of Massachusetts
- Ross E. Cheit 1977, professor of political science and professor of International and Public Affairs at Brown University's Watson Institute for International and Public Affairs
- Kendrick Clements 1951, professor of history and presidential historian
- Dan Cohn-Sherbok, rabbi and professor of Jewish theology, University of Wales, Lampeter
- Eliot Coleman 1961, conservationist and farmer; pioneer of organic and cold-weather farming
- Hardin Coleman, dean of Boston University School of Education
- David Orgon Coolidge, founder of the Marriage Law Project and former professor of law at Catholic University of America
- Robert Coombe 1970, chancellor, University of Denver
- Albert Hewett Coons 1933, professor of pathology and immunology at Harvard Medical School; recipient of 1959 Albert Lasker Award
- Catherine Hirshfeld Crouch 1990, Professor of Physics at Swarthmore College and fellow of the American Physical Society
- Allison Davis 1924, educator, anthropologist, and professor; first African-American to hold a full faculty position at a major white university (University of Chicago)
- Horace Davis 1848, president of the University of California
- John Aubrey Davis Sr. 1933, political science professor and civil rights activist instrumental to the Brown vs. Board of Education legal team
- Tyler Dennett 1904, American historian and professor at Johns Hopkins University, Columbia University, and Princeton University; former president of Williams College; winner of the 1934 Pulitzer Prize for Biography or Autobiography
- Anna Christina De Ozorio Nobre 1985, professor of cognitive neuroscience, University of Oxford
- Charles B. Dew 1958, American South historian, professor at Williams College
- Jennifer Doleac 2003, economist of crime and associate professor at Texas A&M University
- Daniel Drezner 1990, professor at Tufts University, political commentator
- William S. Dudley 1958, naval historian of the United States Navy; director of naval history and director of the Naval Historical Center in Washington, D.C. 1995–2004
- Amos Eaton 1799, co-founder of Rensselaer Polytechnic Institute
- Peter Elbow 1957, professor of English emeritus at the University of Massachusetts Amherst; co-founder of Franconia College; developed the modern "writing process"
- Robert F. Engle 1964, won the 2003 Nobel Prize in Economics "for methods of analyzing economic time series with time-varying volatility" (ARCH models); holds the Armellino Chair at New York University; graduated with highest honors in Physics
- Willard F. Enteman 1959, former president of Bowdoin College
- S. Lane Faison 1929, art historian
- Andrew Guthrie Ferguson 1994, professor of Law at Washington College of Law
- Louis Fieser 1920, organic chemist and former professor emeritus at Harvard University
- Christopher Flavin, president emeritus and former president of the Worldwatch Institute
- Kristin Forbes 1992, associate professor of international management at the MIT Sloan School of Management; member of Council of Economic Advisers (confirmed by the United States Senate in 2003, she is the youngest person to ever hold this position)
- Nathan Fox 1970, developmental psychologist; Distinguished University Professor of Human Development and Quantitative Methodology at the University of Maryland
- Theodore Friend 1952, former president of Swarthmore College

G–M

- Harry Augustus Garfield 1885, former president of Williams College, lawyer, academic, and supervisor of the Federal Fuel Administration during World War I
- Merrill Edwards Gates 1893, ninth president of Rutgers University and sixth president of Amherst College
- Hans W. Gatzke 1938, historian of German Foreign Policy; awarded Guggenheim Fellowship
- Mary Gehring 1994, biomedical researcher at Massachusetts Institute of Technology and Whitehead Institute
- John J. Gilbert 1959, recipient of the 2003 A.C. Redfield Lifetime Achievement Award; major contributor to the fields of ecology and biology
- Michael Goldfield 1965, political scientist, author, labor activist, and former student activist; Professor of Political Science at Wayne State University
- Steven Goode, law professor at the University of Texas at Austin
- Luther Carrington Goodrich 1917, prominent sinologist
- Eban Goodstein 1982, economist, professor, author, and public educator; directs the Center for Environmental Policy and the MBA in Sustainability at Bard College
- Edward Gramlich 1961, economics professor at University of Michigan and member of the Board of Governors of the Federal Reserve
- James C. Greenough 1851, principal of the Rhode Island Normal School, sixth president of the Massachusetts Agricultural College, and seventh principal of the Westfield State Normal School
- Keith Griffin 1960, former president of Magdalen College, Oxford
- Claudio Guillén 1943, professor of comparative literature at Harvard University, University of California, San Diego, and Princeton University
- Elissa Hallem 1999, associate professor of microbiology at the University of California, Los Angeles; 2012 MacArthur Fellowship winner
- Ole Andreas Halvorsen 1986, founder and CEO of Viking Global; billionaire
- Hunt Hawkins 1965, professor at University of South Florida; poet and winner of the Agnes Lynch Starrett Poetry Prize
- Karl G. Heider 1957, anthropologist
- John Henry Haynes 1871, traveller, archaeologist, and photographer; completed extensive archaeological work in the Mediterranean and Mesopotamia at Nippur and Assos
- Joel Hellman, dean of the Edmund A. Walsh School of Foreign Service at Georgetown University; formerly the World Bank's first chief institutional economist
- John Haskell Hewitt 1888, professor of languages; acting president of Williams College
- Catharine Hill 1976, president of Vassar College
- Mahlon Hoagland 1944, former scientific director at Worcester Foundation for Biomedical Research; discovered transfer RNA
- Horace Holley 1799, former president of Transylvania University
- Juliet Hooker 1994, Nicaraguan political scientist; political philosopher at Brown University
- Henry Hopkins 1858, president of Williams College
- Mark Hopkins 1824; cited in former U.S. president James A. Garfield's description of an ideal college: "Give me a log hut, with only a simple bench, Mark Hopkins on one end and I on the other, and you may have all the buildings..."
- Diane Hughes 1979, professor of applied psychology at New York University
- James Willard Hurst 1932, founder of the modern field of American legal history
- Ishrat Husain 1972, governor of the State Bank of Pakistan
- Thomas H. Jackson 1972, president of University of Rochester, 1994–2005
- David A. Jaeger 1986, professor in the Ph.D. program in Economics at the CUNY Graduate Center
- Harry Pratt Judson 1870, president of the University of Chicago, 1906–1923
- Harold L. Kahn 1952, Professor of Chinese History at Stanford University
- Walter Kaufmann 1941, philosopher, poet, and translator
- Charles Stuart Kennedy 1950, founder and current director of the Foreign Affairs Oral History Program at the Association for Diplomatic Studies and Training; oral historian of American diplomats
- Muhammad Kenyatta 1981, professor, civil rights leader and international human rights advocate
- John Sterling Kingsley 1876, professor of biology and zoology
- Daniel Kleppner 1953, physicist; National Medal of Science winner, 2006
- Sally Kornbluth 1982, 18th president of Massachusetts Institute of Technology; former James B. Duke Professor of Pharmacology and Cancer Biology at Duke University School of Medicine; former provost of Duke University
- Edwin Kuh 1947, economist and professor at the MIT Sloan School of Management; John Kenneth Galbraith called him "one of the most innovative economists of his generation"
- Leonard Woods Labaree 1920, chair of the history department at Yale and Connecticut State Historian
- Richard Normand Langlois 1974, professor of economics at University of Connecticut
- Frederick M. Lawrence 1977, president, Brandeis University; former dean, George Washington University Law School
- Petra Levin 1989, microbiologist; professor in the Department of Biology and co-director of the Plant and Microbial Biosciences Graduate Program at Washington University in St. Louis
- David Levy, economist
- Ethan G. Lewis 1995, labor economist and associate professor of economics at Dartmouth College
- George M. Lightfoot 1891, classics scholar, and professor at Howard University
- Marty Linsky, professor at Harvard Kennedy School; co-founder of Cambridge Leadership Associates
- Rayford Logan 1917, professor emeritus of history at Howard University, former chief advisor to the National Association for the Advancement of Colored People (NAACP) on international affairs
- Roger Sherman Loomis 1909, medieval and Arthurian literature scholar
- Margaret D. Lowman 1975, pioneered the science of canopy ecology; director of Global Initiatives and Senior Scientist for Plant Conservation at the California Academy of Sciences
- Brian Lukacher, professor of art history at Vassar College
- James Maas 1961, professor of psychology at Cornell and leading sleep researcher
- Kenneth L. Marcus 1988, founding president of the Louis D. Brandeis Center for Human Rights under Law, professor at Baruch College
- Hamilton Wright Mabie 1867, essayist, editor, critic, and lecturer
- James Ross MacDonald 1944, winner of the 1988 IEEE Edison Medal; instrumental in building up the Central Research laboratories of Texas Instruments
- Mark Maroncelli 1979, professor of chemistry at Pennsylvania State University
- Frank Jewett Mather 1889, art critic; professor of art and archaeology at Princeton
- Curtis T. McMullen 1980, professor of mathematics at Harvard and winner of the 1998 Fields Medal for his work in complex dynamics
- Ernest Addison Moody 1924, professor of philosophy at University of California, Los Angeles, noted medievalist and philosopher
- William Moomaw 1959, professor emeritus of international environmental policy at the Fletcher School of Law and Diplomacy, Tufts University
- Barrington Moore Jr. 1936, leading figure in comparative politics; professor at Harvard
- James F. Moore 1969, pioneer of the "Business ecosystem" concept; Berkman Fellow, Berkman Center for Internet & Society Harvard Law School (2000–2004)
- Terris Moore 1929, second president of the University of Alaska
- Richard Murnane 1966, economist; Juliana W. and William Foss Thompson Professor of Education and Society at the Harvard Graduate School of Education
- Daniel Muzyka 1975, former dean of the Sauder School of Business at the University of British Columbia
- Stewart Myers 1967, professor of financial economics at the MIT Sloan School of Management

N–Z

- Ahmed Naseer 2007, Maldivian economist; State Minister of Finance in the Maldives
- Michael Norton 1997, Harold M. Brierley Professor of Business Administration at Harvard Business School
- C. Stanley Ogilvy 1935, professor of mathematics at Hamilton College; author of books on mathematics and sailing
- Gamaliel S. Olds 1801, professor of mathematics and natural philosophy at Williams College, Amherst College, and University of Vermont
- William Ouchi 1965, professor and author in the field of business management
- Richard C. Overton 1929 (BA), 1934 (MA), railroad historian; first secretary of the Lexington Group in Transportation History; first president of the Business History Conference
- Robert Oxnam 1964, China scholar; president emeritus of the Asia Society
- Arthur Newton Pack 1913, founder of the American Nature Association
- James T. Patterson 1957, Ford Foundation Professor of History emeritus at Brown University
- Noel Perrin 1949, essayist and professor at Dartmouth College
- Arthur Latham Perry 1852, economist
- Bliss Perry 1882, literary critic, writer, editor, and teacher; awarded Legion of Honour by the French
- Lewis Perry 1899, educator and seventh principal of Phillips Exeter Academy; created the Harkness table teaching method
- Anna L. Peterson, scholar of religious studies; professor of religion at the University of Florida
- Earl Potter III 1968, president of St. Cloud State University
- James Bissett Pratt 1897, Mark Hopkins Chair of Intellectual and Moral Philosophy at Williams College
- Samuel I. Prime 1829, founder of the New York Association for the Advancement of Science and Art; president and trustee of Wells College; former trustee of Williams College
- Amy Prieto 1996, professor of Chemistry at Colorado State University; founder and CEO of Prieto Battery
- Phillip Prodger 1989, Senior Research Scholar at the Yale Center for British Art, formerly served as Head of Photographs at the National Portrait Gallery, London
- Jennifer Quinn 1985, professor of mathematics at University of Washington Tacoma and sits on the board of governors of the Mathematical Association of America; former co-editor-in-chief of Math Horizons
- Reginald Ray 1964, Buddhist academic and teacher; founder of the Dharma Ocean Foundation
- George Lansing Raymond 1862, prominent professor of Aesthetic Criticism at Princeton University 1881–1905; held professorships at George Washington University and Williams College and was nominated for the Nobel Prize in Literature seven times
- Eric Reeves 1972, Sudan scholar
- Tannishtha Reya, professor of Pharmacology and Medicine at University of California, San Diego
- Thomas Hedley Reynolds 1942, 5th president of Bates College
- Zalmon Richards 1836, educator, co-founder and first president of the National Education Association
- Steven S. Rogers 1981, senior lecturer at Harvard Business School
- Todd Rogers 1999, professor of Public Policy at the Harvard Kennedy School
- Steven T. Ross 1959, military historian, held academic positions at the University of Nebraska–Lincoln, Williams College, and Yale University; scholar-in-residence at the Central Intelligence Agency
- Mary-Jane Rubenstein 1999, professor of Religion, Science in Society, and Feminist, Gender, and Sexuality Studies at Wesleyan University and former co-chair of the Philosophy of Religion Unit of the American Academy of Religion
- David Ruder 1951, professor and former dean, Northwestern University School of Law; former chairman of the U.S. Securities and Exchange Commission
- William Ruddiman 1964, palaeoclimatologist and professor emeritus at the University of Virginia; known for the "early anthropocene" hypothesis
- Bruce Russett 1956, professor of political science at Yale University, leading figure in international relations
- Alexa Sand 1991, professor of art history at Utah State University
- John Edward Sawyer 1939, 11th president of Williams College
- AnnaLee Saxenian 1976, dean of the School of Information at the University of California, Berkeley
- James C. Scott 1958, Sterling Professor of Political Science and director of Agrarian Studies at Yale University
- Ben Ross Schneider, political scientist and Ford International Professor of Political Science at Massachusetts Institute of Technology
- Samuel Hubbard Scudder 1847, entomologist and paleontologist; founder of American insect paleontology
- John Setear 1981, professor of International Law at the University of Virginia School of Law
- David Newton Sheldon 1830, fifth president of Colby College
- Stuart Sherman 1904, literary critic
- John Douglas Simon 1979, president of Lehigh University
- Francis H. Snow 1868, chancellor of the University of Kansas
- David Sobel, co-founder of The Harrisville School; director of Certificate Programs at Antioch University
- Samuel Sommers 1997, social psychologist and associate professor of psychology at Tufts University
- David Spadafora 1972, former president, Lake Forest College, current president, Newberry Library
- Norman Spaulding 1993, professor of federal civil procedure and professional ethics at Stanford Law School
- Clayton Spencer 1977, president of Bates College, 2011–present
- Douglas Staiger 1984, John French Professor of Economics at Dartmouth College
- Herbert Stein 1935, former chair, Council of Economic Advisers; father of Ben Stein
- Lester Thurow 1960, the Jerome and Dorothy Lemelson Professor of Management and Economics, and former dean (1987–1993), MIT Sloan School of Management
- Paul Hayes Tucker 1972, art historian at University of California Santa Barbara, Williams College, New York University Institute of Fine Arts, Yale University, and Toledo Museum of Art
- Richard P. Usatine 1978, professor of family and community medicine; national recipient of the Humanism in Medicine Award by the Association of American Medical Colleges
- Carl W. Vogt 1958, former president of Williams College, former chair of the National Transportation Safety Board
- R. Jay Wallace 1979, professor of philosophy at University of California, Berkeley
- Richard Warch 1961, president of Lawrence University
- Henry Augustus Ward 1856, geologist and naturalist
- Henry Baldwin Ward 1885, zoologist
- Andrew Weiss 1968, economist, chief executive officer of Weiss Asset Management, and professor emeritus at Boston University
- David Ames Wells 1850, engineer, economist, and textbook author
- William Dwight Whitney 1849, linguist, philologist, and lexicographer known for his work on Sanskrit grammar and Vedic philology; first president of the American Philological Association and editor-in-chief of The Century Dictionary
- Eric Widmer 1962, scholar and educator; founding headmaster of King's Academy in Jordan
- Richard G. Woodbury 1983, economist
- John William Yeomans 1828, president of Lafayette College
- Ethan Zuckerman 1993, director of the MIT Center for Civic Media; founder of Geekcorps and Tripod.com

== Actors, architects, artists, and filmmakers ==
A–M

- Joanna P. Adler 1986, film and television actress
- Sebastian Arcelus 1999, film and theater actor
- Nancy Baker Cahill 1992, multidisciplinary artist
- Alan Baxter 1930, film and television actor
- James Becket 1958, human rights activist and lawyer, filmmaker
- Purva Bedi 1996, film and television actress
- Betsy Beers 1979, television and film producer
- Eve Biddle 2004, founder and co-director of The Wassaic Project
- Paul Boocock 1986, film and theater actor, writer
- Charles William Brackett 1915, Academy Award-winning screenwriter; president of the Academy of Motion Picture Arts and Sciences
- Julia Brown 2000, artist
- Gordon Clapp 1971, Emmy Award-winning actor on NYPD Blue
- Bud Collyer, radio actor and game show host
- Edward Cornell 1966, theater director, first managing director of Shakespeare in the Park
- Pamela Council 2007, textile artist
- Monique Curnen 1992, film and television actress
- Robert Dunham 1953, actor, entrepreneur, and racecar driver
- Dave Erickson 2000, television writer and producer
- Harold Perry Erskine 1902, sculptor and architect
- Walker Evans, photographer; dropped out
- Sarah Fain 1993, screenwriter and film producer
- Keith Fowler, faculty 1964–1968, artistic director of the Virginia Museum Theater, the American Revels Company; theater professor at the University of California, Irvine
- Joshua Frankel, contemporary artist and film director
- John Frankenheimer 1951, director of films including The Manchurian Candidate
- Ulrich Franzen 1943, German-born American architect; designed the Alley Theatre and known for pioneering Brutalist architecture
- Crispin Freeman 1994, voice actor
- John Gallaudet 1925, film and television actor
- Abram Garfield 1893, architect and founder/first president of the Cleveland School of Architecture
- Max Gail 1965, actor
- A. R. Gurney 1952, playwright, including The Dining Room and Sylvia
- Noah Harlan 1997, independent filmmaker, 2008 Emmy Award winner; founder of Two Bulls
- Jason Hehir 1998, filmmaker, director of The Last Dance
- Robert Hiltzik 1979, film director; directed Sleepaway Camp
- Tao Ho 1960, architect
- Wendy W. Jacob 1980, artist
- Graham Jarvis 1952, Canadian actor
- Liza Johnson 1992, film director and professor of art
- Elia Kazan 1931, writer and Academy Award-winning director; director of films including On the Waterfront
- Leslie Keno 1979, appraiser for Antiques Roadshow; furniture designer
- Adam LeFevre 1972, actor
- William F. Lamb 1904, architect; one of the principal designers of the Empire State Building
- Art Lande 1968, jazz pianist
- Standish Lawder 1958, artist; contributed to the structural film movement
- Bruce Leddy, television director and producer
- John Bedford Lloyd 1978, theater and film actor
- Iñigo Manglano-Ovalle 1983, artist
- Carolyn McCormick 1981, actress
- Ralph Eugene Meatyard, attended 1943–1944, photographer
- Meleko Mokgosi 2007, artist
- Donald Molosi 2007, actor, writer, and playwright
- Jonathan Moscone 1986, theater director
- Karin Muller 1987, polyglot, president of Firelight Productions, and documentary producer
- Richard Murphy 1934, Academy Award-nominated screenwriter
- Eliza Myrie 2003, Black American artist, known for social practice

N–Z

- Alexandra Neil 1970, actress
- Kevin O'Rourke 1978, actor
- A. Laurie Palmer 1981, artist, writer, and activist; professor at the School of the Art Institute of Chicago
- Barbara Prey 1979, watercolor artist; member of National Council on the Arts
- Maggie Renzi 1973, film producer and actress
- Marcus T. Reynolds 1891, architect known for bank designs; designed the Delaware and Hudson Railroad Company Building and the First Trust Company Building; many buildings listed on the National Register of Historic Places
- Michael Rosenblum 1976, television producer and video journalist
- John Sayles 1972, Hollywood genre writer and director of independent films including Lone Star and Eight Men Out
- Brad Silberling, film and television director, writer, and producer of films and shows including Reign, Charmed, City of Angels, and Casper
- Peter Simon, stage and television actor
- Eddie Shin 1998, television actor
- Stephen Sondheim 1950, composer and lyricist for stage and screen; composer for Broadway musical theatre
- Jeff Speck 1985, city planner, writer, and lecturer
- Fletcher Steele 1907, landscape architect
- Paul Stekler 1974, documentarian
- Jon Stone 1952, writer, director and co-creator of Sesame Street
- David Strathairn 1970, Academy Award-nominated actor
- Paul Stupin 1979, television and film producer
- Jamie Tarses 1985, television producer and executive
- Jay Tarses 1961, television, film and radio writer, producer and actor
- Sarah Megan Thomas 2001, actress, screenwriter, and producer; known for Equity
- Camille Utterback 1992, interactive installation artist; MacArthur Foundation's "genius award" winner
- Thomas Vitale 1986, executive vice president of Programming & Original Movies for Syfy and Chiller
- Sydney Walsh 1983, actress
- Leehom Wang 1998, singer, songwriter, actor, director
- Brian Wecht 1997, musician
- John F. Wharton 1916, lawyer with a notable impact on developing the theater business in the United States
- Martha Williamson 1977, producer, Touched by an Angel
- William Windom 1946, actor
- Frederick Wiseman 1951, Academy Award-winning director of documentaries including Titicut Follies

== Business ==
A–M

- John Ackerly 1997, CEO and co-founder of Virtru
- Javed Ahmed 1982, chief executive office, Tate & Lyle
- Samuel Thomas Alexander, co-founded major agricultural and transportation businesses in the Kingdom of Hawaii
- Tariq Al Sudairy 1999, chief executive officer, Jadwa Investment
- William Fessenden Allen 1850, businessman in the Kingdom of Hawaii
- Wallace Barnes 1949, former chairman and chief executive officer of the Barnes Group
- Charles Tracy Barney 1858, president of the Knickerbocker Trust Company, a prominent New York trust which failed in the Panic of 1907
- Jess Beck 2007, entrepreneur and co-founder of Hello Alfred
- Quincy Bent 1901, vice president of Bethlehem Steel
- Arnold Bernhard 1923, founder and CEO of Value Line
- Robert A. Bernhard 1951, banker and partner of Lehman Brothers and Salomon Brothers
- R. C. Bhargava, former CEO and current chairman of Indian automobile company Maruti Suzuki
- Edgar Bronfman Sr. 1950, chairman and CEO of Seagram Company Inc. (the international beverage conglomerate and parent company of Warner Music and Universal Pictures), billionaire
- Matthew Bronfman 1981, CEO of BHB Holdings and chairman of Limmud FSU
- Stephen Bronfman 1986, CEO of Claridge
- William Robinson Brown 1897, corporate officer of the Brown Company and Arabian horse breeder
- Oliver Prince Buel 1859, lawyer and banker; founding trustee of the Metropolitan Trust Company
- Steve Case 1980, founder and former CEO of America Online, billionaire
- Edward G. Chace 1905, businessman and entrepreneur in textile manufacturing
- Edward Cabot Clark 1830, businessman and co-founder of the Singer Corporation with Isaac Singer
- Charles Payson Coleman Sr. 1948, lawyer, managing partner of Davis Polk & Wardwell (1977–1982)
- Chase Coleman III 1997, founder and president of Tiger Global Management, billionaire
- Toby Cosgrove 1962, CEO of the Cleveland Clinic
- Peter Currie 1978, president of Currie Capital and former CFO of Netscape
- John D'Agostino 1997, youngest VP in history of New York Mercantile Exchange, and subject of the Ben Mezrich book Rigged, the True Story of an Ivy League Kid who Changed the World of Oil
- Fairleigh Dickinson Jr. 1941, president and chairman of Becton Dickinson
- Joseph Oriel Eaton II 1895, founder of Eaton Corporation
- Michael R. Eisenson 1977, founder and CEO of Charlesbank Capital Partners
- Alexander Falck 1899, businessman; former director of Chemung Canal Trust Company and former president of Corning Inc. (1920–1928)
- Neil Fiske 1984, president and CEO of Eddie Bauer
- Paul Fitchen 1922, Federal Reserve Bank
- Alex Fort Brescia, co-chairman of Grupo Breca and chairman of BBVA Continental
- Adena Friedman 1991, president of NASDAQ OMX
- Harry Augustus Garfield 1885, co-founder of the Cleveland Trust Company, the precursor to KeyBank
- Mark Gerson 1994, co-founder and chairman of Gerson Lehrman Group
- Richard Georgi 1985, real estate financier and investor
- Theodore P. Gilman 1862, banker and railroad executive; published the original plan for the creation of the Federal Reserve System
- Kenard Gibbs 1986, chief executive officer of Soul Train Holdings and MadVision Entertainment
- David Gow 1985, owner and chairman of Gow Broadcasting and Yahoo Sports Radio
- Don Graves 1992, investment banker
- Harry Hagey 1963, former chief executive officer and chairman of Dodge & Cox
- Ole Andreas Halvorsen 1986, founder and chief investment officer of Viking Global Investors, billionaire
- Walter Foxcroft Hawkins 1884, former vice president of Berkshire Life Insurance Company
- Peter deCourcy Hero 1964, philanthropy consultant
- George Washington Hill 1904, former president of American Tobacco Company
- Hale Holden 1890, former president of Chicago, Burlington and Quincy Railroad; served as a director at American Telephone & Telegraph, New York Life Insurance Company, and the Chemical Bank & Trust
- Willem J. "Hans" Humes 1987, founder and chief investment officer of Greylock Capital Management
- James C. Kellogg III 1937, chairman of Port Authority of New York and New Jersey and chairman of the board of governors of the New York Stock Exchange; youngest person to be elected chairman of the New York Stock Exchange; former partner of Spear, Leeds & Kellogg
- Muhoho Kenyatta 1985, CEO of Brookside Dairy Limited, former vice-chairperson of the Commercial Bank of Africa Group
- Donald S. Klopfer, publisher and co-founder of Random House
- Jonathan Kraft 1986, president of The Kraft Group, president of New England Patriots, owner of New England Revolution, billionaire
- Daniel W. Layman Jr. 1929, one of the creators of Monopoly
- James B. Lee 1975, vice chairman of JPMorgan Chase Bank, N.A.
- Herbert H. Lehman 1899, co-founder and former CEO of Lehman Brothers Investment Bank, governor and U.S. senator for New York
- David Levy, chairman of the Jerome Levy Forecasting Center LLC
- Robert I. Lipp 1960, chairman and CEO of Travelers Property Casualty Corp., former president of Chemical Bank
- Ramon Lopez 1988, former president and CEO of the RFM Corporation
- Herbert Louis 1950, billionaire and philanthropist
- John Jeffry Louis III 1985, chairman of Gannett; board member of Olayan Group; S. C. Johnson & Son; chairman of the Fulbright Commission
- Demetri Marchessini 1956, Greek businessman and political pundit
- John B. McCoy 1965, former CEO of Bank One
- Ajata "AJ" Mediratta 1987, co-president at Greylock Capital Management
- Nancy Melcher, women's fashion designer specializing in lingerie

N–Z

- Mariam Naficy 1991, founder and CEO of Eve.com and Minted
- Vineet Nayyar 1971, CEO of Tech Mahindra, chairman of Mahindra Satyam
- Matthew Nimetz 1960, former chief operating officer of General Atlantic
- Bob Nutting 1983, chairman of the board and principal owner of Pittsburgh Pirates; chairman and CEO of Odgen Newspapers and Nutting Newspapers, billionaire
- William Oberndorf 1975, managing director of SPO Partners, prominent conservative donor, billionaire
- Mike Onoja 1976, Nigerian philanthropist, entrepreneur, and politician
- George Oppenheimer 1922, playwright and founder of The Viking Press
- Clarence Otis Jr. 1977, CEO of Darden Restaurants
- Roland Palmedo 1917, investment banker at Lehman Brothers; founder of the Mad River Glen ski area, co-founder of National Ski Patrol
- David Paresky 1960, former president of Thomas Cook Travel, billionaire
- Patrick S. Parker 1951, former CEO and chairman of Parker Hannifin
- Bo Peabody 1994, founder of Tripod (sold to Lycos in 1998 for $64 million) and chairman of Village Ventures
- Peter Allen Peyser 1976, public affairs consultant
- Gerald Phipps 1936, construction company founder; owner of the Denver Broncos
- Richardson Pratt Jr 1946, chairman of Charles Pratt&Company, president of the Pratt Institute
- Jason Priest 1991, tech and hospitality executive
- Amy Prieto 1996, professor of Chemistry at Colorado State University; founder and CEO of Prieto Battery
- Mitchell Reiss 1979, president and CEO of Colonial Williamsburg Foundation
- Caleb Rice 1814, first president of MassMutual, now a Fortune 100 company
- Joseph L. Rice III 1954, founder of Clayton, Dubilier & Rice, Inc., private equity investment firm and Trustee Emeritus of Williams College
- Robert E. Rich Jr. 1963, majority owner and chairman of Rich Products, billionaire
- Michael Roizen 1967, physician and medical entrepreneur; founder of RealAge and other medical companies; chief wellness officer at the Wellness Institute at the Cleveland Clinic
- Robert Scott 1968, former president and chief operating officer of Morgan Stanley
- Mayo Shattuck III 1976, president and CEO of Constellation Energy Group and former chairman of Alex Brown, LLC
- John A. Shaw 1962, CEO / president of the American Overseas Clinic Corporation
- Elissa Shevinsky 2001, serial entrepreneur in security technology
- Walter V. Shipley 1957, former president of Chemical Bank
- William Pratt Sidley 1889, former managing partner
- Henry R. Silverman 1961, chairman and CEO of Cendant Corporation
- Bill Simon 1973, founder of William Simon & Sons, a global merchant bank
- Mark Sisson 1975, CEO of Primal Nutrition
- George Steinbrenner 1952, owner of the New York Yankees
- Hal Steinbrenner 1991, principal owner, managing general partner and co-chairman of the New York Yankees, billionaire
- William Sullivan 1993, chief financial officer of Applied Genetic Technologies Corporation
- Tarek Sultan 1986, CEO and vice chairman of Agility Logistics
- Jamie Tarses 1985, former president, ABC Entertainment
- Mark Tercek 1979, former president and CEO of The Nature Conservancy (2008–2019)
- Grace Paine Terzian 1974, chief communications officer of MediaDC, the parent company of The Washington Examiner and The Weekly Standard
- Frederick Ferris Thompson 1854, bank founder
- Frederick K. Thun 1928, one of the creators of Monopoly
- Louis R. Thun 1928, one of the creators of Monopoly
- John van Eck 1936, founder and CEO of Van Eck Global
- Fay Vincent 1960, eighth commissioner of Major League Baseball, former chairman of Columbia Pictures
- Edgar Wachenheim III 1959, investor and philanthropist, CEO/Founder of Greenhaven Associates
- Michael Weiner 1983, executive director of Major League Baseball Players Association
- Andrew Weiss 1968, economist and chief executive officer of Weiss Asset Management
- Peter Booth Wiley 1964, chairman of John Wiley & Sons
- Clark Williams 1892, banker and politician
- Peter Willmott 1959, former president and chief operating officer of FedEx, former C.E.O. of Carson Pirie Scott and Zenith Electronics; chairman of the Children's Memorial Hospital, Chicago
- Jonah Wittkamper, co-founder and global director of Nexus Global Youth Summit; entrepreneur
- Selim Zilkha 1946, entrepreneur and philanthropist
- Chris Zook 1973, business writer and head of Bain & Company's Global Strategy Practice
- Ethan Zuckerman 1993, director of the MIT Center for Civic Media; founder of Geekcorps and Tripod.com

== Curators, archaeologists and museum directors ==
- Gantuya Badamgarav, Mongolian art curator and founder of Art Space 976+ in Ulaanbaatar, Mongolia
- Brent Benjamin 1986, director, St. Louis Art Museum
- Johnson Chang 1973, curator and director of contemporary Chinese art galleries in Hong Kong and Taiwan
- John W. Coffey 1978, deputy director, North Carolina Museum of Art
- Anna Cohn 1972, Judaic scholar and museum curator
- Michael Govan 1985, director, Los Angeles County Museum of Art
- John Henry Haynes 1871, traveller, archaeologist, and photographer; completed extensive archaeological work in the Mediterranean and Mesopotamia at Nippur and Assos
- Sam Hunter 1943, founding director, Rose Art Museum; director, Poses Institute for the Fine Arts; director, Jewish Museum; acting director, Minneapolis Institute of the Arts
- Benjamin Ives Gilman 1880, secretary of the Boston Museum of Fine Arts
- Thomas Krens 1969, director, Guggenheim Museums Worldwide
- George Kuwayama 1947, curator who spent most of his career at the Los Angeles County Museum of Art
- John R. Lane 1966, director of the San Francisco Museum of Modern Art (1987–1997)
- Chaédria LaBouvier 2007, curator and journalist; first Black exhibition curator at the Guggenheim
- Victoria Sancho Lobis 2002, director of the Benton Museum of Art
- Glenn D. Lowry 1976, director of the Museum of Modern Art, New York City
- Roger Mandle 1963, executive director of Qatar Museums Authority, former deputy director and chief curator, National Gallery of Art and president, RISD
- Frank Jewett Mather 1889, art critic; professor of art and archaeology at Princeton
- Shamim M. Momin 1995, head of Los Angeles Nomadic Division and adjunct curator for Whitney Museum of Art
- Charles Percy Parkhurst 1935, director of the Baltimore Museum of Art, chief curator of the National Gallery of Art, and one of the "monuments men"
- Earl A. Powell III 1966, director of the National Gallery of Art 1992–present
- Phillip Prodger 1989, Senior Research Scholar at the Yale Center for British Art, formerly served as Head of Photographs at the National Portrait Gallery, London
- Edgar Preston Richardson 1925, art historian and director of the Detroit Institute of Arts and Winterthur Museum, Garden and Library
- Whitney Stoddard 1935, chair of Williams College's art department
- Alexandra Suda 2005, director of the National Gallery of Canada
- Joseph C. Thompson 1981, director of the Massachusetts Museum of Contemporary Art
- Paul Hayes Tucker 1972, Set the attendance record at the Boston Museum of Fine Arts; curator and art historian
- Kirk Varnedoe 1968, chief curator of painting and sculpture, Museum of Modern Art, until his death in 2003
- Arthur K. Wheelock Jr. 1965, curator of the Northern European Art Collection at the National Gallery of Art
- J. Keith Wilson 1978, associate director and curator of Ancient Chinese art at the Freer Gallery of Art and the Arthur M. Sackler Gallery at the Smithsonian Institution
- James N. Wood 1963, former director and president of the Art Institute of Chicago (1980–2004); president and CEO of the J. Paul Getty Trust

== Government officials and political notables ==
=== Ambassadors, diplomats, and bureaucrats ===
- Alice P. Albright 1983, CEO of the Millennium Challenge Corporation
- Elisha Hunt Allen 1823, diplomat to the Kingdom of Hawaii
- Daniel Dewey Barnard 1818, U.S. envoy to Prussia
- James Phinney Baxter III 1914, director of the Office of Strategic Services
- Don Beyer 1971, U.S. ambassador to Switzerland and Liechtenstein
- William D. Brewer 1943, U.S. ambassador to Mauritius (1970–1973), U.S ambassador to Sudan (1973–1977)
- Philip Marshall Brown 1897, diplomat
- Henry E. Catto Jr. 1952, United States Information Agency director and former U.S. ambassador to the United Kingdom
- Warren Clark Jr. 1958, U.S. ambassador to Gabon and U.S. ambassador to Sao Tome and Principe (1987–1989)
- Victoria Coates, special assistant to the president and senior director for strategic assessments on the United States National Security Council; National Security advisor to Ted Cruz's 2016 presidential campaign
- Charles Burke Elbrick 1929, career ambassador; U.S. ambassador to Brazil (1969–1970), U.S. ambassador to Yugoslavia (1964–1969), and U.S. ambassador to Portugal (1959–1963)
- Steven Fagin 1989, U.S. ambassador to Yemen (2022–)
- James Gilfillan 1856, thirteenth treasurer of the United States
- Donald Gregg 1951, former CIA South Korea station chief, former national security advisor to Vice President Bush and ambassador to South Korea; president and chairman of the Korea Society
- Richard Helms 1935, former CIA director and ambassador to Iran
- William Henry Hunt 1885, former slave who served in the American diplomatic corps during the 19th century; served posts in France, Portugal, and Liberia
- James C. Humes 1957, presidential speechwriter for Nixon; co-authored text of the Apollo 11 Lunar plaque
- Hallett Johnson 1908, ambassador to Costa Rica
- Elsie S. Kanza 2000, Tanzanian ambassador to the United States (2021–)
- Arthur Levitt Jr. 1952, chairman of the U.S. Securities and Exchange Commission (1993–2001)
- Jon Lovett, former assistant director of speechwriting for President Obama and former speechwriter for then Senator Clinton
- John J. Louis Jr. 1949, ambassador to the United Kingdom
- Jeb Magruder 1958, political operative for the GOP and Richard Nixon's re-election committee; served prison time for conspiracy
- Carl Marzani 1935, served in the federal intelligence agency, the Office of Strategic Services, and the U.S. Department of State
- William Green Miller, U.S. ambassador to Ukraine (1993–1998)
- Richard Moe 1959, chief of staff for Vice President Walter Mondale and president of the National Trust for Historic Preservation
- Matthew Nimetz 1960, diplomat
- Phelps Phelps 1922, ambassador to Dominican Republic and 38th governor of American Samoa
- Ganson Purcell 1927, chairman of the U.S. Securities and Exchange Commission (1942–1946)
- Mitchell Reiss 1979, senior American diplomat and former director of Policy Planning at the United States Department of State
- David Sturtevant Ruder 1951, chairman of the U.S. Securities and Exchange Commission (1987–1989)
- Miriam Sapiro 1981, U.S. trade representative
- Francis Bowes Sayre Sr. 1909, high commissioner to the Philippines
- Susan Schwab 1976, U.S. trade representative (2006–2009); former dean, University of Maryland School of Public Policy
- Douglas H. Shulman 1989, commissioner of Internal Revenue
- Cheryl Marie Stanton, administrator of the Wage and Hour Division, United States Department of Labor; awarded the Order of the Palmetto
- David A. Starkweather 1824, U.S. ambassador to Chile
- Eric Stein, deputy assistant secretary for Commerce Protection at the U.S. Department of Treasury
- Herbert Stein 1936, chairman of the Council of Economic Advisors
- Paul A. Trivelli 1974, U.S. ambassador to Nicaragua (2005–2008)
- Carl W. Vogt 1958, former president of Williams College, former chair of the National Transportation Safety Board
- Wahidullah Waissi 2005, Afghan ambassador to Fiji, Australia
- Philip C. Wilcox Jr. 1958, diplomat and coordinator for Counterterrorism

=== Governors and state politicians ===
- Navjeet Bal 1984, general counsel of Nixon Peabody's Public Finance group; former commissioner of Revenue for Massachusetts
- Richard H. Balch 1921, former chairman of New York State Democratic Committee and campaign manager
- Erastus Newton Bates 1853, Illinois treasurer (1869–1873)
- Don Beyer 1972, lieutenant governor of Virginia, ambassador to Switzerland, congressman from Virginia (2015–)
- Luther Bradish 1804, lieutenant governor of New York, assistant U.S. treasurer
- Henry Shaw Briggs 1844, 8th Massachusetts auditor
- William Bross 1838, 16th lieutenant governor of Illinois, early member of the Republican Party
- Arne Carlson 1957, 37th governor of Minnesota
- Henry H. Childs 1802, 16th lieutenant governor of Massachusetts (1843–1844); president of Berkshire Medical College
- Martha Coakley 1975, Massachusetts attorney general
- Henry Alexander Scammell Dearborn 1801, 9th adjutant general of Massachusetts
- Sanford Dole 1867, governor of Territory of Hawaii
- Alfred E. Driscoll 1925, 60th governor of New Jersey
- Joseph B. Ely 1902, 58th governor of Massachusetts
- Theodore P. Gilman 1862, New York state comptroller (1900–1903)
- John Z. Goodrich 1848, 24th lieutenant governor of Massachusetts
- Philip Hoff 1948, 73rd governor of Vermont
- Doug Hoffer 1973, Vermont state auditor and policy analyst
- Jacob M. Howard 1830, attorney general of Michigan (1855–1860)
- Henry Hoyt 1849, 18th governor of Pennsylvania
- Joseph A. Johnson 1939, member of the Virginia House of Delegates (1974–1983)
- John C. Keeler 1873, deputy attorney general of New York (1882–1883)
- William C. Kittredge 1821, lieutenant governor of Vermont 1852–1853
- Herbert H. Lehman 1899, 49th governor of New York; co-founder of Lehman Brothers
- Marty Linsky, chief secretary/counselor to Governor William Weld
- John G. McMynn 1848, superintendent of public instruction of Wisconsin, educator
- James Miller 1803, first governor of Arkansas Territory, and a brigadier general in the United States Army during the War of 1812
- Matthias Nicoll Jr. 1889, physician and New York state health commissioner
- Chap Petersen 1990, 2008 Virginia state senator, 34th District; 2005 candidate for lieutenant governor of Virginia
- Phelps Phelps, 38th governor of American Samoa and U.S. ambassador to the Dominican Republic (died 1981)
- John S. Robinson 1824, 22nd governor of Vermont
- F. Joseph Sensenbrenner Jr. 1970, deputy attorney general, Wisconsin (1977–1983); chief of staff, office of the governor, Wisconsin (1975–1977)
- Bill Simon 1973, two-time California gubernatorial candidate
- Walker Stapleton 1996, Colorado state treasurer
- Charles Stebbins 1807, lieutenant governor of New York
- Charles Warren Stone 1863, lieutenant governor of Pennsylvania
- Bruce Sundlun 1946, 69th governor of Rhode Island
- Samuel A. Talcott 1809, attorney general of New York (1821–1829)
- Nathaniel Tallmadge 1814, last governor of the Territory of Wisconsin
- Joseph Tucker 1851, lieutenant governor of Massachusetts (1869–1873)
- Stephen H. Urquhart 1989, Utah state legislator 2001–present
- Gilbert Carlton Walker 1854, 43rd governor of Virginia
- Oliver Warner 1842, Massachusetts secretary of the Commonwealth
- Emory Washburn 1817, 27th governor of Massachusetts
- Charles S. Whitman 1890, 44th governor of New York
- Charles Williams 1800, 20th governor of Vermont
- Clark Williams 1892, New York state comptroller
- William Durkee Williamson 1804, 2nd governor of Maine

=== Legislature (state and national) ===
A–F

- Josiah Gardner Abbott, US representative for the Massachusetts Fourth Congressional District
- Elisha Hunt Allen 1823, Maine First Congressional District (1841–1843)
- Chester Ashley 1811(?), Arkansas senator (1844–1848)
- Henry W. Austin 1886, representative in Illinois House of Representatives (1903–1909), representative in Illinois State Senate (1915–1923)
- Daniel Barnard 1818, New York congressman (1827–1829, 1839–1845)
- Wallace Barnes 1949, former Connecticut state senator
- Erastus Newton Bates 1853, member of the Illinois House of Representatives
- Erastus C. Benedict 1821, New York state politician; member of New York State Assembly and New York State Senate
- Samuel Betts 1806, New York congressman (1815–1817)
- Lewis Bigelow 1803, Massachusetts congressman (1821–1823)
- Victory Birdseye 1804, New York congressman (1815–1817)
- Bernard Blair 1825, New York congressman (1841–1843)
- Prescott E. Bloom 1964, Illinois state senator (1975–1986)
- Samra Brouk 2008, member of the New York State Senate from the 55th district (2021–)
- Samuel Augustus Bridges 1826, Pennsylvania congressman (1848-–1849, 1853–1855, 1877–1879)
- Edward Espenett Case 1975, Hawaii Second Congressional District (2003–2007), Hawaii First Congressional District (2019–present)
- Alfred Clark Chapin 1869, New York congressman (1891–1892)
- Timothy Childs 1811, New York congressman (1829–1831, 1835–1839, 1841–1843)
- Horace Francis Clark 1833, New York congressman (1857–1861)
- John C. Clark 1811, New York congressman (1827–1829, 1837–1843)
- Ernest Harold Cluett 1896, New York congressman (1937–1943)
- Ralph Cole 1936, member of the Ohio House of Representatives
- Joseph S. Curtis 1853, member of the Wisconsin State Assembly; lawyer and soldier in the Union Army
- Stephen B. Cushing 1832, member of the New York State Assembly and New York State attorney general
- David Davis IV 1928, Illinois state senator 1953–1967
- Horace Davis 1848, member of the U.S. House of Representatives from California's 1st congressional district (1877–1881)
- Henry Alexander Scammell Dearborn 1801, member of the U.S. House of Representatives from Massachusetts's 10th district
- David S. Dennison Jr. 1940, United States representative of 11th Ohio Congressional District (1957–1959)
- Rodolphus Dickinson 1821, United States representative of Ohio's 6th congressional district (1847 – died in office on March 20, 1849)
- Fairleigh Dickinson Jr. 1941, member of the New Jersey Senate
- Michael Dively, Michigan state representative and gay rights activist (born 1938)
- James Dixon 1834, Connecticut congressman (1845–1849) and senator (1857–1869)
- Michael Edward Driscoll 1877, New York congressman (1899–1913)
- Frederick E. Draper 1895, represented 31st Senate District in New York Senate
- Henry Williams Dwight 1809(?), Massachusetts congressman (1821–1831)
- Justin Dwinell, US representative of New York's 22nd congressional district (1823–1825)
- Steve Farley 1985, Arizona state senator (2013–present) and Arizona state representative (2007–2013)
- Martin Finch 1837, New York state assemblyman (1860–1861)
- Orin Fowler 1813, member of the U.S. House of Representatives from Massachusetts's 9th district

G–M

- William H. Gest 1860, Illinois congressman (1887–1891) and judge
- Charles W. Gilchrist 1958, Maryland state senator
- Andy Goodell 1976, New York State congressman
- Charles Ellsworth Goodell 1948, New York congressman and senator (1959–1971)
- John Z. Goodrich 1848, member of the US House of Representatives from Massachusetts (1851–1855)
- Robert M. Gordon 1972, member of the New Jersey Senate from the 38th district
- Byram Green 1808, New York congressman (1843–1845) and co-founder of the American missionary movement
- Henry Hosford Gurley 1810, member of the U.S. House of Representatives from Louisiana's 2nd district (1823–1831)
- Aaron Hackley Jr. 1805, New York congressman (1819–1821)
- Osee M. Hall 1868, U.S. representative from Minnesota's 3rd congressional district (1891–1895), state senator in Minnesota Senate
- Moses Hayden 1804, New York congressman (1823–1827)
- Abner Hazeltine 1815, New York congressman (1833–1837)
- Jonathan Healy 1967, Massachusetts state congressman (1971–1993)
- John P. Hiler 1975, Indiana congressman (1981–1991)
- Phineas Hitchcock 1855, United States senator from Nebraska (1871–1877), delegate to the U.S. House of Representatives from Nebraska Territory (1865–1867)
- Myron Holley 1799, member of the New York State Assembly (1816, 1820–21); played a large role in the construction of the Erie Canal; namesake of Holley, New York
- Jacob M. Howard 1830, member of the US House of Representatives (representing 1st Michigan District) and US Senate from Michigan
- Edward Swift Isham 1857, member of the Illinois House of Representatives (1864–1866)
- John James Ingalls 1855, Kansas senator (1873–1891)
- Ferris Jacobs Jr. 1856, New York congressman (1881–1883)
- Joseph A. Johnson 1939, member of the Virginia House of Delegates (1974–1983)
- John C. Keeler 1873, member of New York State Assembly (1891, 1892)
- Edward Aloysius Kenney 1906, New Jersey congressman (1933–1938)
- Steve Kelley 1975, former Minnesota state senator
- John E. Kingston 1948, member of the New York State Assembly 1960–1974
- William C. Kittredge 1821, member and former speaker of the Vermont House of Representatives
- Samuel Knox 1836, Missouri congressman (1864–1865)
- Addison Henry Laflin 1843, New York congressman (1865–1871)
- Abraham Lansing 1855, member of the New York State Senate (1882–1883)
- Andy Levin 1983, Michigan congressman (2019–present)
- Ellen Cogen Lipton 1988, member of the Michigan House of Representatives for the 27th District
- Henry C. Martindale 1800, New York congressman (1823–1831, 1831–1835)
- William H. Maynard 1810, member of the New York State Senate Fifth District; sat on the 52nd-55th New York State Legislatures
- Robert McClellan 1825, New York congressman (1837–1839, 1841–1843)
- Stephen C. Millard 1865, New York congressman (1883–1887)
- Clement Woodnutt Miller 1940, member of the U.S. House of Representatives from California's 1st district (1959–1962)
- Elijah H. Mills 1797, Massachusetts congressman (1815–1819) and senator (1820–1827)
- Ernest E. Moore 1906, speaker of the Vermont House of Representatives (1935–1937)
- Chris Murphy 1996, U.S. senator (since 2013); Connecticut congressman (2007–2013)
- Paul Murphy 1954, Massachusetts state representative and federal judge

N–Z

- Josiah T. Newcomb 1892, member of the New York State Assembly and New York State Senate
- Henry F. C. Nichols 1859, member of the Wisconsin State Assembly
- David A. Noble 1825, United States representative for the 2nd Congressional District of Michigan
- Jesse O. Norton 1835, Illinois congressman (1853–1857, 1863–1865) and U.S. attorney for Northern Illinois
- Abram B. Olin 1835, New York congressman (1857–1863) and judge
- Frank C. Osmers Jr., New Jersey congressman (1939–1941, 1951–1965)
- John G. Otis, Kansas congressman (1891–1893)
- Alonzo C. Paige 1812, New York state congressman; member of the New York State Assembly (1827–1830) and the New York State Senate (1837–1842)
- John Palmer, ca. 1810, U.S. congressman from New York (1817–1819 and 1837–1839)
- Bishop Perkins 1807, member of the United States House of Representatives from New York's 17th District (1853–1855); member of the New York State Assembly (1846–1849)
- Job Pierson, New York congressman (1831–1835)
- James Porter 1810, New York congressman (1817–1819)
- John Porter 1810, member of the New York State Senate (1843–1846)
- Orlando B. Potter 1845, member of the United States House of Representatives from New York City (New York's 11th District) 1883–1885; established the National Banking Act in the United States
- Jason Priest 1980, member of the Montana State Senate (2011–2015)
- Almon Heath Read 1811, member of the U.S. House of Representatives from Pennsylvania's 17th, 12th congressional districts (1842–1843, 1843–1844)
- Caleb Rice 1814, mayor of Springfield, Massachusetts and member of the Massachusetts House of Representatives; first president of MassMutual
- Harvey Rice 1824, member of the Ohio State Senate (1851–1853)
- Elijah Rhoades 1813, member of the New York State Senate (1841–1844) from the 7th District
- Edward Rogers 1809, New York congressman (1839–1841)
- Henry W. Seymour 1855, Michigan congressman (1888–1889)
- Jonathan Sloane 1812, Ohio congressman (1833–1837)
- Horace B. Smith 1847, New York congressman (1871–1875) and justice of New York Supreme Court
- George N. Southwick 1884, New York congressman (1895–1899, 1901–1911)
- James Spallone 1987, Connecticut state representative from the 36th District (2000–2011)
- David A. Starkweather 1824, U.S. representative from Ohio's 18th District (1839–1841, 1845–1847); member of the Ohio House of Representatives and Ohio State Senate
- Chris Stearns, Washington state representative from the 47th District (2022–present)
- Charles Stebbins 1807, New York state senator from the 5th District (1826–1829)
- John B. Steele 1836, New York congressman (1861–1865)
- Francis Lynde Stetson, New York representative in the 28th U.S. Congress
- Charles Warren Stone 1863, member of the U.S. House of Representatives from Pennsylvania's 27th district (1890–1899)
- Solomon Strong 1798, Massachusetts congressman (1815–1819)
- Gaye Symington 1976, speaker of the Vermont House of Representatives (2005–2009), Member of the Vermont House of Representatives (1996–2009)
- Egbert Ten Eyck 1799, member of the U.S. House of Representatives; member of the New York State Assembly
- Martin I. Townsend 1833, U.S. House of Representatives member from New York's 17th congressional district (1875–1879)
- Joseph Tucker 1851, Massachusetts state senator and state representative
- James H. Tuthill 1846, lawyer, member of the New York State Assembly
- Mark Udall 1972, Colorado congressman (1999–2009) and senator (2009–2015)
- Christopher C. Upson 1851, U.S. House of Representatives member from Texas's 6th District
- Samuel Finley Vinton 1814, Ohio congressman (1823–1836, 1843–1851)
- Jonathan Vipond 1967, Pennsylvania congressman in the Pennsylvania House of Representatives
- William Walaska 1968, member of the Rhode Island Senate (1995–2003, 2003–2017)
- Ebenezer Walden 1799, member of the New York State Assembly
- Oliver Warner 1842, member of the Massachusetts Senate and Massachusetts House of Representatives
- George B. Wellington 1878, member of the New York State Senate (1916–1918)
- Chris West 1972, member of the Maryland State Senate (2019–)
- Charles K. Williams 1800, member of the Vermont House of Representatives
- Seward H. Williams 1892, U.S. House of Representatives member from Ohio's 14th District (1915–1917); member of the Ohio House of Representatives
- Austin Eli Wing 1814, U.S. House of Representatives member from Michigan Territory (1825–1829, 1831–1833)
- Richard G. Woodbury 1983, member of the Maine Senate from the 11th district (2010–2014)
- William Lowndes Yancey (member of the class of 1833 but did not graduate), Alabama congressman (1844–1846) and Confederate senator from Alabama (1862–1863)

=== Municipal ===
- Francis W. H. Adams 1925, New York City Police Commissioner 1954–1955
- Thomas Bernard 1992, mayor of North Adams, Massachusetts (2018–present)
- Stephen Decatur Bross 1830, pioneer settler in Nebraska and Colorado; namesake of Decatur, Nebraska
- Henry Perrin Coon 1844, mayor of San Francisco, California (1863–1867)
- Gordon Davis 1963, first commissioner of Parks and Recreation in New York City; founding chairman of Jazz at Lincoln Center; founding trustee of the Central Park Conservancy
- Walter Foxcroft Hawkins 1884, attorney and former mayor of Pittsfield (1896–1897)
- Robert H. Jeffrey 1895, mayor of Columbus, Ohio (1903–1906)
- Elisha Johnson, mayor of Rochester, New York (1838)
- William MacVane 1937, mayor of Portland, Maine (1971), surgeon, and recipient of the Bronze Star during World War II
- Michael McGinn 1982, mayor of Seattle, Washington (since 2009)
- Henry F. C. Nichols 1859, mayor of New Lisbon, Wisconsin
- F. Joseph Sensenbrenner Jr. 1970, mayor of Madison, Wisconsin 1983–1989
- Ebenezer Walden 1799, mayor of Buffalo, New York
- Kevin White 1952, mayor of Boston, Massachusetts (1968–1983)

=== Presidents, prime ministers, and cabinet positions ===
- Fakhruddin Ahmed, chief advisor of the caretaker government (title given to the interim prime minister) of Bangladesh since January 12, 2007; former governor of Bangladesh Bank, the central bank of the country, responsible for making the country's monetary policies; obtained Masters in development economics
- William C. Apgar 1968, U.S. assistant secretary of Housing and Urban Development for Housing under President Bill Clinton
- Kakha Baindurashvili, minister of Finance of Georgia (2009–2011)
- Richard A. Ballinger 1884, U.S. secretary of the interior and mayor of Seattle
- Tariq Banuri 1972, chairman of the Pakistan Higher Education Commission
- Richard Beckler 1962, general counsel of the General Services Administration
- William John Bennett 1965, secretary of education under President Ronald Reagan; appointed as the United States' first drug czar under President George H. W. Bush
- Justin Butterfield 1811, 12th commissioner of the General Land Office
- Ian Brzezinski 1986, deputy assistant secretary of defense for Europe and NATO policy under President George W. Bush
- Hikmet Çetin 1961, deputy prime minister of Turkey, 20th speaker of the Grand National Assembly, and former minister of foreign affairs
- Bainbridge Colby 1890, secretary of state under Woodrow Wilson and founder of United States Progressive Party
- William Thaddeus Coleman III 1969, general counsel of the Army under President Bill Clinton
- Ashley Deeks 1993, associate White House counsel and deputy legal adviser to the U.S. National Security Council in the Biden administration
- Nikoloz Gagua 2013, minister of Finance of Georgia (2018–present)
- James A. Garfield 1856, 20th president of the United States
- James Rudolph Garfield 1885, U.S. secretary of the interior
- Pavlos Geroulanos, minister of Culture of Greece (2009–2012)
- Goh Chok Tong, prime minister of Singapore (1990–2004); received Masters from Williams Center for Development Economics
- Don Graves 1992, nominee for U.S. deputy secretary of commerce
- Ishrat Husain 1972, governor of the State Bank of Pakistan
- P. B. Jayasundera 1980, Sri Lankan economist and former permanent secretary of the Ministry of Finance (Sri Lanka)
- Ahmad Kaikaus, principal secretary under Prime Minister Sheikh Hasina
- Ramon Lopez 1988, secretary of trade and industry in the Philippines
- Kathleen Merrigan 1982, U.S. deputy secretary of agriculture 2009–2013; named "100 Most Influential People in the World" by TIME magazine in 2010
- Ahmed Naseer 2007, Maldivian economist; State Minister of Finance in the Maldives
- Benjamin H. Read 1947, 1st United States Under Secretary of State for Management
- Randall Schriver 1989, assistant secretary of defense for Asian and Pacific Security Affairs; CEO / president of Project 2049 Institute; founding partner of Armitage International, LLC
- John A. Shaw 1962, CEO / president of the American Overseas Clinic Corporation; deputy undersecretary of defense for International Technology Security; assistant secretary of commerce
- William Spriggs 1977, assistant secretary for policy at the Department of Labor
- Herbert Stein 1936, chairman of the Council of Economic Advisors
- Sardar Ahmad Nawaz Sukhera, cabinet secretary of Pakistan
- Arkhom Termpittayapaisith 1983, finance minister of Thailand (2020–)
- Margarito Teves 1968, secretary of finance of the Philippines (2005–2010); received master's from Williams Center for Development Economics
- Carina Vance Mafla 1999, Ecuador's minister for Public Health
- Christine Wormuth 1981, United States secretary of the Army (2021–2025), under secretary of defense for policy (2014–2016)
- V-Nee Yeh 1981, member of Executive Council of Hong Kong

=== Royalty ===
- Prince Hussain Aga Khan 1997, Shia Muslim royalty
- Reza Pahlavi (would have been 1983), former crown prince of Iran; matriculated at Williams, but left after his freshman year due to the Iranian Revolution led by Ayatollah Ruhollah Khomeini

== Judiciary and legal ==
A–M

- Francis W. H. Adams 1925, United States attorney for the Southern District of New York
- George W. Anderson 1886, circuit judge, United States Court of Appeals for the First Circuit
- James Barker 1860, justice of the Massachusetts Supreme Judicial Court
- Samuel Betts 1806, judge, United States District Court for the Southern District of New York
- Eric Bjornlund 1980, co-founder and president of Democracy International
- Reuben P. Boise 1843, 9th associate justice of the Oregon Supreme Court, 5th chief justice of the Oregon Supreme Court
- Curtis Bok 1918, judge, justice of the Pennsylvania Supreme Court
- Bennett Boskey 1935, lawyer who clerked for Judge Learned Hand and for two U.S. Supreme Court justices, Stanley Forman Reed and Chief Justice Harlan F. Stone
- Henry Shaw Briggs 1844, justice for the Central Berkshire District Court
- William B. Brown 1934, Ohio Supreme Court associate justice
- Janet H. Brown 1973, executive director of the Commission on Presidential Debates
- Alonzo P. Carpenter 1849, associate justice of the New Hampshire Supreme Court 1881–1896, chief justice of that court 1896–1898
- Charles Clapp 1945, judge, United States Tax Court
- Edgar E. Clark 1878, chief executive of Order of Railway Conductors and served on the Interstate Commerce Commission
- William Thaddeus Coleman III 1969, general counsel of the Army under President Bill Clinton
- James Denison Colt 1838, associate justice of the Massachusetts Supreme Judicial Court (1865–1866, 1868–1881)
- David Orgon Coolidge, founder of the Marriage Law Project
- Gordon Davis 1963, lawyer at Venable LLP; prominent leader in New York City
- Dickinson Richards Debevoise 1948, senior judge, United States District Court for the District of New Jersey
- Charles Dewey 1806, justice of the Indiana Supreme Court (1836–1847)
- Charles Augustus Dewey 1811, justice of the Massachusetts Supreme Judicial Court
- Joseph A. Diclerico Jr. 1963, judge, United States District Court for the District of New Hampshire
- Anita Earls 1981, associate justice of the North Carolina Supreme Court
- Robert H. Edmunds Jr., former associate justice of the North Carolina Supreme Court
- Morris Leopold Ernst 1909, lawyer and co-founder American Civil Liberties Union
- David Dudley Field II 1825, lawyer and reformer who made major contributions to the development of American civil procedure
- Stephen J. Field 1837, associate justice of the U.S. Supreme Court and chief architect of the constitutional theory that protected industry from federal regulation during the rapid industrialization that followed the American Civil War
- Vincent J. Fuller 1952, lawyer known for defending John Hinckley Jr., Jimmy Hoffa, and Mike Tyson
- Lee Parsons Gagliardi 1941, judge, United States District Court for the Southern District of New York
- William Ball Gilbert 1868, judge, United States Court of Appeals for the Ninth Circuit
- George H. Goodrich 1949, justice, Superior Court of the District of Columbia
- Madeline Hughes Haikala 1986, U.S. district judge, Northern District of Alabama
- Raymond Headen (Class of 1984), judge on the 8th District Court of Appeals of Ohio
- Jameel Jaffer 1994, director of the national civil liberties project at ACLU
- Robert Joseph Kelleher 1935, senior judge, United States District Court for the Central District of California
- Daniel Kellogg 1810, United States attorney for the District of Vermont (1829–1841) and justice of the Vermont Supreme Court (1845–1850)
- Nikolas Kerest 1994, lawyer, nominee to serve as the United States attorney for the District of Vermont, current assistant United States attorney
- Lina Khan 2010, Pakistani-American jurist, chair of Federal Trade Commission 2021–2025
- John Milton Killits 1880, judge, United States District Court for the Northern District of Ohio
- Rives Kistler 1971, associate justice, Oregon Supreme Court
- Anthony T. Kronman 1968, dean (1994–2004) and Sterling Professor of Law, Yale Law School
- Kenneth L. Marcus 1988, staff director, U.S. Commission on Civil Rights (2004–2008)
- David Markus 1994, deputy chief counsel in the New York State Judiciary; judicial referee in the New York Supreme Court; co-chair of ALEPH: Alliance for Jewish Renewal; co-rabbi of Temple Beth-El of City Island
- Edward Cochrane McLean 1924, judge, United States District Court for the Southern District of New York
- Paul Michel 1963, chief judge, United States Court of Appeals for the Federal Circuit
- Lawrence Mitchell 1978, dean, Case Western University School of Law
- George Morell 1807, chief justice of the Michigan Supreme Court

N–Z

- Edgar J. Nathan 1913, Manhattan borough president and judge of the New York Supreme Court
- Addison Niles 1852, associate justice of the Supreme Court of California
- Arthur Nims 1945, Senior Judge of the United States Tax Court
- Charles Cooper Nott Jr. 1890, judge of the New York General Sessions Court
- Abram Baldwin Olin 1835, judge, United States District Court for the District of Columbia
- William T. Quillen 1956, justice, Supreme Court of Delaware
- Norman Redlich 1947, dean of NYU Law School and special assistant on the Warren Commission
- Meile Rockefeller 1977, lawyer and drug law reformer
- Howard Frederic Sachs 1947, senior judge, United States District Court for the Western District of Missouri
- Silas Sanderson 1846, seventh chief justice of California
- Benjamin R. Sheldon 1831, justice of the Illinois Supreme Court
- Jeffrey Sutton 1983, circuit judge, United States Court of Appeals for the Sixth Circuit
- Samuel A. Talcott 1809, attorney general of New York (1821–1829)
- Telford Taylor 1928, prosecutor of Nazis at the Nuremberg Trials, General in the U.S. Army, and professor of law at Columbia University and Yeshiva University's Cardozo School of Law
- Jackson Temple 1851, associate justice of the Supreme Court of California
- Jon S. Tigar 1984, judge, United States District Court for the Northern District of California
- Charles K. Williams 1800, chief justice of the Vermont Supreme Court
- Edward E. Wilson 1892, assistant state attorney, Cook County, Illinois (1912–1947)
- John F. Wharton 1916, lawyer, founding partner of Paul, Weiss, Rifkind, Wharton & Garrison
- Charles Barker Wheeler 1873, New York Supreme Court justice
- Gregory Howard Woods 1991, judge, general counsel for U.S. Department of Energy
- Frank Wozencraft 1949, assistant attorney general in charge of the Office of Legal Counsel in the United States Justice Department

== Medicine ==
- Ross J. Baldessarini 1959, psychopharmacologist, director of the International Consortium for Bipolar & Psychotic Disorders Research at McLean Hospital and professor of Psychiatry (Neuroscience) at Harvard Medical School
- David Bellinger 1971, professor of neurology at Harvard Medical School and professor in the Department of Environmental Health at Harvard School of Public Health
- William F. Bernhard, M.D. 1944, cardiovascular surgeon and cardiovascular researcher at Boston Children's Hospital
- Richard Besser, M.D., 1981, former acting director, Centers for Disease Control and Prevention
- Walter Bortz II, M.D., 1951, professor at Stanford Medical School; author of books on aging
- Louis R. Caplan, M.D., 1958, physician and professor of neurology at Harvard Medical School
- John B. Chapin 1850, physician and mental hospital administrator; advocate for humane and appropriate treatment of mentally ill patients
- Barton Childs, M.D., 1938, pediatrician and geneticist at Johns Hopkins
- Henry H. Childs 1802, president of Berkshire Medical College
- Albert Coons, M.D., 1933, pathologist-immunologist; recipient of the 1959 Albert Lasker Award in Basic Research
- Toby Cosgrove 1962, CEO and president of the Cleveland Clinic
- Benjamin L. Ebert, M.D., chair of Medical Oncology at the Dana–Farber Cancer Institute and the George P. Canellos, MD and Jean S. Canellos Professor of Medicine at Harvard Medical School
- Nathaniel Bright Emerson 1865, physician and author of Hawaiian mythology
- Jonathan Fielding, M.D., 1964, director of the Los Angeles County Department of Public Health
- William Goodell 1851, M.D. notable gynecologist
- Robert E. Gould 1946, clinical professor of psychiatry at New York Medical College and chief of adolescent services at Bellevue Hospital
- Gabriel Grant 1848, doctor and Union Army major; awarded the Medal of Honor
- Leston Havens 1947, pioneer in the establishment of hospital psychopharmacology units; directed the psychiatry residency program at Cambridge Hospital
- Stuart B. Levy 1960, researcher and physician; first advocate for greater awareness of antibiotic resistance
- Dr. Jay Loeffler 1977, chair of the Department of Radiation Oncology at Massachusetts General Hospital; highly distinguished physician in oncology
- Herbert Louis 1950, orthopedic surgeon and billionaire
- Matthias Nicoll Jr. 1889, physician and New York State Health Commissioner
- Rajveer Purohit 1993, Director of Reconstructive Urology at Icahn School of Medicine at Mount Sinai
- Michael Roizen, M.D., author of best-seller You: The Owner's Manual; chairman of RealAge, Inc.; former dean, Syracuse University Medical School; administrator at the Cleveland Clinic
- Martin A. Samuels 1967, physician, neurologist, and teacher of medicine
- Norman Spack, M.D., 1965, pediatric endocrinologist and assistant professor of pediatrics at Harvard Medical School
- Henry Reed Stiles 1876, superintendent of the State Homeopathic Asylum for the Insane; author of several historical and genealogical works
- Richard P. Usatine 1978, professor of family and community medicine; national recipient of the Humanism in Medicine Award by the Association of American Medical Colleges

== Military ==
- Samuel C. Armstrong 1862, educator; commissioned officer in the Union Army during the American Civil War
- Erastus Newton Bates 1853, brevet brigadier general in the American Civil War
- Lewis Benedict 1837, colonel of the 162nd New York Volunteer Infantry; killed at the Battle of Pleasant Hill
- Henry Shaw Briggs 1844, brigadier general in the Union Army during the American Civil War
- Stephen Clarey 1962, Navy admiral commanding during Operation Desert Shield
- Warren "Bunge" Cook 1998, current commander of the 2nd Battalion, 4th Marines
- Edward Peck Curtis 1917 (dropped out to serve in World War I), major general and chief of staff, U.S. Strategic Air Force in Europe during World War II
- Henry Eugene Davies, brigadier general of the Union Army during the American Civil War
- Hasbrouck Davis 1845, general from Massachusetts
- Myles C. Fox 1939, awarded the Navy Cross for his heroic actions during World War II
- Gabriel Grant 1848, doctor and Union Army major; awarded the Medal of Honor
- Truman Seymour 1865, major general and later painter; received his A.M. degree
- George R. C. Stuart 1946, president of the Virginia Bar Association, member of the Virginia House of Delegates
- Mark L. Tidd 1977, 25th chief of Chaplains of the United States Navy 2010–2014
- William Bradford Turner 1914, awarded the Medal of Honor posthumously for actions in France 1918
- Albert William Tweedy Jr., Marine Corps aviator; USS Tweedy named in his honor
- Charles White Whittlesey 1905, awarded Medal of Honor for his actions as commander of the famed Lost Battalion of World War I
- Clark Williams 1892, World War I veteran; awarded Conspicuous Service Cross
- Ephraim Williams Jr., benefactor of Williams College; colonel in the Massachusetts militia; killed in action during the Battle of Lake George in the French and Indian War
- Edwin B. Wheeler 1939, general of the United States Marine Corps; served in three wars

== Music ==
- Kristen Anderson-Lopez 1994, Academy Award-winning songwriter
- Bill Barbot, 1990, singer and guitarist, Jawbox
- Caitlin Canty 2004, singer/songwriter
- Chris Collingwood 1989, Fountains of Wayne member
- Darlingside, indie folk band founded in 2009 by Don Mitchell, Auyon Mukharji, Harris Paseltiner, and David Senft while undergraduates at Williams
- Kris Delmhorst, singer-songwriter
- William Finn 1974, Broadway composer of musicals, including Falsettos and The 25th Annual Putnam County Spelling Bee; winner of a Tony Award
- John R. Graham, film composer
- Judd Greenstein 2001, composer; co-director, New Amsterdam Records
- Edward Danforth Hale 1880, music school pedagogue in piano, collegiate music school dean at Colorado College; major proponent of standardized music education in public schools
- Will Holt 1951, singer-songwriter
- Jason Howland 1993, composer of the Broadway musical Little Women, which opened in January 2005 at the Virginia Theatre
- Marcus Hummon 1984, Nashville-based singer-songwriter; twice nominated for a Grammy Award, won for Best Country Song ("Bless the Broken Road", performed by Rascal Flatts) in 2006; sometimes performs with a band called Redwing
- Art Lande 1969, jazz pianist and composer
- Chris Lightcap 1993, bassist, composer and bandleader
- Alastair Moock 1995, folk and children's musician
- John Morris Russell 1982, symphony conductor
- Adam Schlesinger 1989, Fountains of Wayne and Ivy member; Grammy and Emmy award winner
- Stephen Sondheim 1950, Broadway composer of musicals
- Leehom Wang 1998, singer-songwriter and actor in East Asia
- Brian Wecht 1997, Ninja Sex Party keyboardist and internet personality
- Jesse Winchester 1966, singer-songwriter
- Nick Zammuto 1999, of The Books

== Religion ==
- Samuel James Andrews 1839, lawyer, Congregational clergyman, and writer
- Morris F. Arnold 1936, suffragan bishop of the Episcopal Diocese of Massachusetts
- Rachel Barenblat 1996, poet, blogger and rabbi
- Boon Tuan Boon-Itt 1889, early leader in the Protestant Christian community of Thailand
- Charles F. Boynton 1928, bishop of the Episcopal Diocese of Puerto Rico
- Joab Brace 1854, minister
- Nathan Brown 1830, missionary to India and abolitionist
- Dan Cohn-Sherbok 1966, Jewish theologian and author on religion
- Wallace E. Conkling, 7th bishop of the Episcopal Diocese of Chicago
- Samuel Warren Dike, Congregational clergyman and early advocate of divorce reform
- John Dunbar 1826, missionary to Pawnee indigenous peoples of Nebraska
- Henry Martyn Field 1838, author and clergyman
- David Dudley Field I ~1804, congregational clergyman, historical writer
- Samuel Fisher 1799, educator at Deerfield Academy and American clergyman
- Washington Gladden 1859, Congregational church pastor and leading member of the Progressive Movement
- Nathaniel Herrick Griffin 1836, Presbyterian minister
- Gordon Hall 1808, one of the first two American Board of Commissioners for Foreign Missions; instrumental in founding the first American overseas missions
- Harvey Rexford Hitchcock 1828, Protestant missionary to Hawaii
- Henry Richard Hoisington 1823, missionary on the American Board of Commissioners for Foreign Missions to Ceylon
- Horace Holley 1799, Unitarian minister and president of Transylvania University
- Horace Holley 1909, Hand of the Cause of the Baháʼí Faith
- John McClellan Holmes 1853, Christian minister and author
- John Howard 1973, 8th bishop of the Episcopal Diocese of Florida
- Charles W. Huntington 1876, Congregational clergyman
- Charles McEwen Hyde 1852, missionary to Hawaii
- Hamilton Hyde Kellogg 1921, fifth bishop of Minnesota in The Episcopal Church
- Jonas King 1816, Congregational clergyman and missionary to Greece
- Harry R. Jackson Jr., Christian preacher and senior pastor at Hope Christian Church
- Joseph Horsfall Johnson 1870, 1st bishop of Los Angeles in The Episcopal Church; founder of The Bishop's School and trustee of Pomona College
- Edward W. Jones 1951, 9th bishop of Indianapolis, 1977–1997
- Timothy Lull 1965, president of Pacific Lutheran Theological Seminary
- David Belden Lyman 1828, missionary to Hawaii; opened boarding school for Hawaiians
- Jeb Stuart Magruder 1958, White House official involved in the Watergate scandal; later became a Presbyterian minister
- David Markus 1994, attorney and co-chair of ALEPH: Alliance for Jewish Renewal; co-rabbi of Temple Beth-El of City Island
- Samuel John Mills 1805, founding member of the American Board of Commissioners for Foreign Missions and the American Missionary movement; founding member of the American Colonization Society
- Nicholas Murray 1826, moderator of the General Assembly of the Presbyterian Church in the United States of America
- Norman Nash 1915, tenth bishop of Massachusetts in The Episcopal Church
- Samuel I. Prime 1829, clergyman, traveler, and writer
- Luther Rice attended 1807–1810, Baptist minister and American missionary to India; namesake of Luther Rice University and helped establish George Washington University
- William Richards 1815, missionary and politician in the Kingdom of Hawaii
- Thomas Robbins 1796, Congregational minister and first librarian of the Connecticut Historical Society
- Charles Seymour Robinson 1849, pastor and compiler of hymns
- Eleazer Root 1821, educator and Episcopal priest
- Francis Bowes Sayre Jr. 1937, dean of the Washington National Cathedral
- Michael Scanlan 1953, Roman Catholic priest
- Lucius Edwin Smith 1843, lawyer, editor, clergyman, and educator
- John Todd 1845, minister and author
- David Jewett Waller Sr. 1834, minister, entrepreneur and civic leader
- Preston Washington 1970, prominent pastor and minister in New York City
- William Farrar Weeks 1864, coadjutor bishop of the Episcopal Diocese of Vermont
- John William Yeomans 1828, Lafayette College president 1841–1844, Moderator of the General Assembly of the Presbyterian Church 1860

== Science, technology, and engineering ==
- Robert Grant Aitken 1892, astronomer, director of Lick Observatory; compiled comprehensive catalog of double stars
- Albert LeRoy Andrews 1899, former president of the Sullivant Moss Society, renamed in 1970 the American Bryological and Lichenological Society
- Edward Bartow 1892, chemist and an expert in the field of sanitary chemistry
- Justin Brande 1939, conservationist and farmer; co-founded Vermont Natural Resources Council
- Richard M. Brett 1925, conservationist and author
- William Keith Brooks 1870, zoologist and founder of the Chesapeake Zoological Laboratory
- A. J. Bernheim Brush 1996, computer scientist known for studying human-computer interaction; co-chair of CRA-W
- John M. Darby 1831, botanist; created the first catalogue of flora of the southeastern United States
- Chester Dewey 1810, botanist
- Amos Eaton 1799, botanist and geologist
- Ebenezer Emmons 1818, geologist
- Alexander L. Fetter 1958, director of the Laboratory for Advanced Materials; former chair of the Physics Department, Stanford University (1985–1990)
- Louis Fieser 1920, Harvard chemistry professor and inventor
- Harry L. Fisher 1909, rubber chemist; 69th president of the American Chemical Society
- Christopher Flavin, president emeritus of the Worldwatch Institute
- John J. Gilbert 1959, recipient of the 2003 A.C. Redfield Lifetime Achievement Award; major contributor to the fields of ecology and biology
- Ralph E. Gomory 1950, president of the Alfred P. Sloan Foundation; director of research for IBM; National Medal of Science winner, 1988
- Chapman Grant 1910, biologist and herpetologist; grandson of U.S. President Ulysses S. Grant
- J. T. Gulick (1855–1859), evolutionary biologist
- G. Stanley Hall 1867, "father of American psychology"; first American to be awarded a Doctor of Psychology
- William Higinbotham 1932, physicist; credited with creating the first video game
- Mahlon Hoagland 1944, former scientific director at Worcester Foundation for Biomedical Research; discovered transfer RNA
- George William Hunter 1896, author of Civic Biology, the textbook at the heart of the Scopes Trial
- Janet Iwasa 1999, cell biologist and animator
- Margaret D. Lowman 1975, pioneered the science of canopy ecology; director of Global Initiatives and senior scientist for Plant Conservation at the California Academy of Sciences
- John Sterling Kingsley 1876, biologist and zoologist
- Daniel Kleppner 1953, physicist; National Medal of Science winner, 2006
- James Ross MacDonald 1944, winner of the 1988 IEEE Edison Medal; instrumental in building up the Central Research laboratories of Texas Instruments
- Michael Cary McCune 1967, software architect of real-time air defense software at Litton Data Systems; co-founder of Command Control Communications Corporation
- Terris Moore 1929, mountaineer
- Edward Morley 1860, co-performed the Michelson–Morley experiment
- James Orton 1855, explorer and naturalist; contributed much to the knowledge of South America and the Amazon Basin
- Arthur Newton Pack 1913, founder of the American Nature Association
- William Ruddiman 1964, palaeoclimatologist
- Lewis Morris Rutherfurd 1834, astronomer and pioneering astrophotographer
- Truman Henry Safford 1854, astronomer, observatory director, human calculator
- Samuel Hubbard Scudder 1847, entomologist and paleontologist; founder of American insect paleontology
- Henry Augustus Ward 1856, geologist and naturalist
- Henry Baldwin Ward 1885, zoologist
- David Ames Wells 1850, engineer, economist, and textbook author
- Ethan Zuckerman 1993, co-founder of Tripod.com; founder of Geekcorps; fellow at the Berkman Center for Internet and Society

== Sports ==
- Tala Abujbara 2014, Qatari Olympic rower
- Mike Bajakian 1996, quarterbacks coach, Tampa Bay Buccaneers (since 2015)
- Hanna Beattie 2017, ice hockey forward for Connecticut Whale
- Benny Boynton 1921, football player; named to Walter Camp's All-American teams in 1919 and 1920; played in the early years of the National Football League; member of the College Football Hall of Fame
- John Bray 1899, bronze medalist at the Olympic Games in Paris
- Jack Wright 1893, American football coach
- Ethan Brooks 1996, former National Football League offensive lineman
- Hal Brown 1922, Olympic athlete; won gold at the 1920 Summer Olympics
- Dan Calichman 1990, Major League Soccer All-Star
- Henry Clarke 1897, baseball player
- Dave Clawson 1989, college football head coach, Wake Forest University
- Dick Colman 1936, Princeton University football head coach (1957–1968); member of the College Football Hall of Fame
- Jim Duquette 1988, senior vice president of baseball operations for the Baltimore Orioles
- Pat Duquette 1993, head coach, University of Massachusetts Lowell basketball (since 2013)
- Sean Gleeson 2007, quarterbacked Williams Ephs football 2003–2006, currently the offensive coordinator and quarterbacks coach for Oklahoma State Cowboys football under head coach Mike Gundy
- Henry Greer 1921, men's field hockey player
- Will Hardy 2010, professional basketball coach; current head coach of the Utah Jazz
- Jeff Hastings 1981, former ski jumper
- Bob Hatch 1901, American football coach; former head coach at Colgate University
- John W. Hollister 1893, American football coach; head coach at Beloit College, Ole Miss, and Morningside College
- Charles P. Hutchins 1894, American football coach
- John Jay 1938, Rhodes Scholar and American skiing pioneer; invented the ski film in its modern form
- Jonathan Kraft 1986, operator, investor and owner's representative to the New England Patriots, New England Revolution and Gillette Stadium; chief operating officer of The Kraft Group
- Robert Leavitt 1907, Olympic gold medalist in 110-meter hurdles
- Jack Maitland 1970, football player; running back in the National Football League in the 1970s; earned a Super Bowl ring with the Baltimore Colts in Super Bowl V
- Bijan Mazaheri 2016, distance runner
- Jack Mills 1911, professional baseball player for the Cleveland Indians
- Leslie Milne 1979, Olympic field hockey athlete; won bronze at the 1984 Summer Olympics
- Kevin Morris 1986, head coach, University of Massachusetts football team (2009–2011); Yale offensive coordinator (2012 & 2013); Monmouth University (2014–present)
- Angus Morrison, canoeist
- Samuel B. Newton 1880, American football player and coach at Pennsylvania State University, Lafayette College, Lehigh University, and Williams College
- Coach Ogilvie, head football coach at New York University (1899)
- Frank "Buck" O'Neill 1902, College Football Hall of Fame coach
- Dave Paulsen 1987, head coach, George Mason University men's basketball; coached Williams to 2003 Division III national championship
- Frank Pergolizzi, athletic director at Husson College
- Scott Perry, former defensive back in the National Football League; played four seasons with the Cincinnati Bengals
- Robert L. "Nob" Rauch 1980, former executive director of the Ultimate Players Association; president of the World Flying Disc Federation; member of the Ultimate Hall of Fame
- Duncan Robinson 2017, professional basketball player for the Miami Heat (2018–present)
- Tom Roe 1964, hockey player
- Frederick Bushnell "Jack" Ryder 1892, first paid head coach, Ohio State Buckeyes
- Richard C. Squires 1953, notable tennis, frontenis, squash, and platform tennis player
- George Steinbrenner 1952, owner of the New York Yankees
- Harold Z. Steinbrenner 1991, general partner of New York Yankees
- Khari Stephenson 2004, Major League Soccer and Jamaica national football team player
- Rafael Stone 1994, general manager of the Houston Rockets
- Fay Vincent 1960, former Major League Baseball commissioner
- Romel V. Wallen 2004, Jamaica national football team player
- Michael Weiner 1983, general counsel for the Major League Baseball Players Association
- Chris Willenken 1997, bridge player

== Trustees ==
- Michael R. Eisenson 1977, chairman of the board of trustees; CEO and founder of Charlesbank Capital Partners
- Ole Andreas Halvorsen 1986, founder and CEO of Viking Global Investors
- Clarence Otis Jr. 1977, CEO of Darden Restaurants
- Martha Williamson 1977, CEO of MoonWater Productions
- Gregory Howard Woods 1991, judge of the United States District Court for the Southern District of New York

== Writing, journalism, and advocacy ==
A–F

- Peter Abrahams 1968, writer of crime thrillers
- Henry Mills Alden 1857, managing editor of Harper's Magazine
- Rachel Axler 1999, four-time Emmy Award winner; television comedy writer and playwright
- William Chauncey Bartlett, writer, lawyer and abolitionist
- James Phinney Baxter III, won the 1947 Pulitzer Prize for History for Scientists Against Time
- Stephen Birmingham 1950, writer
- Lesley M.M. Blume 1998, award-winning writer and journalist
- Daniel I. Bolnick 1996, editor-in-chief of the journal The American Naturalist
- Paul Boocock 1988, writer and theater actor
- Charles Brackett 1915, novelist, screenwriter, and film producer; winner of Academy Award for Best Original Screenplay and Academy Award for Best Adapted Screenplay
- Richard M. Brett 1925, conservationist and author
- Sterling Brown 1922, poet
- Herbert Brucker 1921, former editor-in-chief of the Hartford Courant; national advocate for freedom of the press
- William Cullen Bryant 1814, poet; editor-in-chief New-York Evening Post (later the New York Post) (1828–1878)
- Erin Burnett 1998, anchor of CNN's Erin Burnett OutFront
- James MacGregor Burns 1939, Pulitzer Prize-winning author
- Michelle Cuevas 2004, author of children's books
- Mika Brzezinski 1989, reporter on MSNBC; daughter of Zbigniew Brzezinski, National Security Advisor under U.S. President Jimmy Carter
- Kristin Cashore, author of Graceling, Fire, and Bitterblue
- Christopher Clarey 1986, journalist and global sports columnist
- Hal Crowther 1966, author and essayist
- Dominick Dunne 1949, author
- Max Eastman 1905, writer and political activist
- Jiayang Fan 2006, Chinese-American journalist and staff writer for The New Yorker
- Eugene Field, writer and children's poet
- Peter Filkins, poet and literary translator; teaches literature at Bard College
- Philip L. Fradkin 1957, environmentalist, historian, journalist, and author
- Naoko Funayama 1995, rinkside reporter for Boston Bruins games on the New England Sports Network

G–M

- Dorothy Gambrell, cartoonist of online comic strip Cat and Girl
- Joshua Glenn 1989, editor and writer
- Ralph Graves, reporter, editor, and writer
- Michael Joseph Gross 1992, author and journalist; speechwriter for William Weld
- Matt Gutman 2000, ABC News correspondent
- Barbara Bradley Hagerty, journalist
- Nathan Hale 1804, newspaper publisher who introduced editorial content as a feature
- Joseph C. Harsch 1927, journalist
- David G. Hartwell 1963, editor of science fiction and fantasy literature; described as "perhaps the single most influential book editor of the past forty years in the American science fiction publishing world"
- Hunt Hawkins 1965, professor at University of South Florida; Poet and winner of the Agnes Lynch Starrett Poetry Prize
- Isaac Henderson, novelist, dramatist, publisher of the New York Evening Post
- Akua Lezli Hope, artist, poet, and writer
- Frank Huyler 1988, poet, writer, and physician
- Naomi Jackson 2002, novelist
- Julie Joosten 2002, American-Canadian poet
- Dan Josefson 1996, writer; winner of the Whiting Award
- John Kifner 1963, writer and editor at The New York Times
- Donald S. Klopfer, publisher and co-founder of Random House
- Edward J. Larson 1974, 1998 Pulitzer Prize for History winner for Summer for the Gods: The Scopes Trial and America's Continuing Debate over Science and Religion
- John Howard Lawson 1914, playwright and screenwriter; first president of the Writers Guild of America, West; one of the Hollywood Ten
- Clifton Leaf 1985, editor-in-chief of Fortune Magazine
- Jim Lobe 1970, journalist and the Washington bureau chief of the Inter Press Service
- William Loeb III 1927, publisher of the Manchester Union Leader
- Fiona Maazel 1997, novelist
- Hamilton Wright Mabie 1867, essayist, editor, critic, and lecturer; first president of the North American Interfraternity Conference
- Dave Marash 1964, Nightline correspondent
- Joseph McElroy 1951, author
- Jay McInerney 1976, author of Bright Lights, Big City
- Bethany McLean 1992, author of The Smartest Guys in the Room about the collapse of Enron
- Richard Meryman 1948, journalist, biographer, and editor; interviewed numerous luminaries for his work at Life
- L. E. Modesitt Jr. 1965, author of science fiction and fantasy; noted for his The Saga of Recluce series
- R. A. Montgomery 1958, author/creator of the Choose Your Own Adventure series
- Charles Morton 1921, associate editor of The Atlantic Monthly
- Dennis Murphy 1969, four-time Emmy winner for excellence in news reporting; NBC News correspondent

N–Z

- Sonia Nazario 1982, Pulitzer Prize for Feature Writing winner
- Rory Nugent 1975, explorer and writer; mounted expeditions along the Congo and Brahmaputra River
- Robert C. O'Brien, novelist and journalist
- Kira Obolensky, playwright and recipient of a 1997 Guggenheim Fellowship
- Rollo Ogden 1878, journalist; editor of The New York Times and New York Post
- Lizzie O'Leary 1998, journalist; host of Marketplace Weekend
- George Oppenheimer 1922, journalist, playwright, and founder of The Viking Press
- Robert Wilson Patterson 1871, editor-in-chief of the Chicago Tribune; president of the Tribune Company
- Bliss Perry 1882, editor of The Atlantic Monthly
- Victoria Price 1984, writer
- Samuel I. Prime 1829, editor of the New York Observer
- Claudia Rankine 1986, poet and playwright, 2016 MacArthur Fellow
- Wade Rathke 1970, editor-in-chief of Social Policy and founder of the Association of Community Organizations for Reform Now (ACORN)
- George Mather Richards 1902, illustrator and painter
- Harvey Rice 1824, poet and newspaperman (founded The Plain Dealer)
- Thomas Robbins 1796, first librarian of the Connecticut Historical Society
- Edward Payson Roe 1860, novelist
- Stacy Schiff 1982, Pulitzer Prize for Biography or Autobiography winner
- Eric P. Schmitt 1982, Pulitzer Prize winner
- Horace Scudder 1858, essayist and man of letters
- Salomón de la Selva 1913, Nicaraguan poet and honorary member of the Mexican Academy of Language
- Scott Shane 1976, journalist and author; expert on the intelligence community
- Stuart Sherman 1904, literary critic and editor
- Wendy Shalit 1997, author of A Return to Modesty and Girls Gone Mild
- David Shipley 1985, New York Times editor; former speechwriter for U.S. President Bill Clinton
- Harry James Smith 1902, playwright
- Hedrick Smith 1955, 1974 Pulitzer Prize for International Reporting winner
- Lucius Edwin Smith 1843, lawyer, editor, clergyman, and educator
- John Lawson Stoddard 1871, writer, hymn writer, lecturer
- Andy Straka, Shamus Award-winning crime novelist
- Tui T. Sutherland 1998, Venezuelan-American children's book author; Jeopardy! champion
- John Toland 1936, writer
- Norah Vincent 1990, syndicated columnist; author of Self-Made Man
- Sean Saifa Wall, advocate for intersex rights; former president of Interact Advocates for Intersex Youth
- Charles Webb 1961, author of the novel The Graduate
- Vanessa Wruble 1996, co-founder of the 2017 Women's March

== See also ==
- List of people from Massachusetts
