= Trading Up =

Trading Up may refer to:

- Trading Up (Vogel book), a 1995 book on political economy by David Vogel
- Trading Up (novel), a 2003 novel by Candace Bushnell
- Trading Up: The New American Luxury, a business book co-authored by Neil Fiske
- Trading Up, a 2000s UK television series presented by Colin McAllister and Justin Ryan
- Trading Up, a 2010s UK television series presented by Mike Brewer
- "Trading Up", a 1979 episode of the TV series Working Stiffs
- "Trading Up", a 2009 episode of the TV series Family Biz
- "Trading Up", a 2011 episode of the TV series American Pickers
