= Ross J. Baldessarini =

American psychopharmacologist

Ross J. Baldessarini (born 1937, Western Massachusetts), a psychopharmacologist, is the Director, International Consortium for Bipolar & Psychotic Disorders Research at McLean Hospital and Professor of Psychiatry (Neuroscience) at Harvard Medical School.

== Education ==
- 1959 AB in Chemistry, Williams College
- 1963 MD, Johns Hopkins University School of Medicine

== Publications ==
=== Books ===
Chemotherapy in Psychiatry: Pharmacologic Basis of Treatments for Major Mental Illness

=== Selected journal articles ===
- Vázquez GH, Tondo L, Undurraga J, Baldessarini RJ. Overview of antidepressant treatment of bipolar depression. International Journal of Neuropsychopharmacology 2013;16(7):1673-1685.
- Yildiz A, Vieta E, Nikodem M, Correll CU, Baldessarini RJ. A network meta-analysis on comparative efficacy and all-cause discontinuation of antimanic treatments in acute bipolar mania. Psychological Medicine 2014;1–19.
- Schalkwijk S, Undurraga J, Tondo L, Baldessarini RJ. Declining efficacy in controlled trials of antidepressants: effects of placebo dropout. International Journal of Neuropsychopharmacology 2014;17(8):1343-1352.
