= Dick Squires =

American tennis player

Richard C. Squires (1931-2003) (popularly known as Mr. Paddle) was a notable tennis, frontenis, squash, and platform tennis player who popularised the sport of platform tennis.

== Early life ==
Squires graduated from The Hill School, where he was a "straight D" student. He then matriculated at Williams College, where he was on the Dean's List and captain of the squash and tennis teams.

He competed in frontenis in the 1968 Olympics.

== Platform tennis ==
He was inducted into the Platform Tennis Hall of Fame in 2003.
