= Catherine Hirshfeld Crouch =

American materials physicist

- Born: Swarthmore, Pennsylvania, USA

Academic background
- Education: BA, Physics, 1990, Williams College; PhD, Physics, 1996, Harvard University
- Thesis: Single electron transport and charge quantization in coupled quantum dots (1996)

Catherine Louise Hirshfeld Crouch is an American materials physicist. She is a Full professor in the Department of Physics at Swarthmore College and faculty director of Swarthmore's Natural Sciences & Engineering Inclusive Excellence Initiatives.

In 2021, Hirshfeld Crouch was elected a Fellow of the American Physical Society for "her leadership in physics education research, focused on promoting the thoughtful use of interactive engagement for all students, for making physics relevant to life science majors, and supporting others through archiving of key resources, mentoring, and commitment to equity and inclusion in STEM."

== Early life and education ==
Hirshfeld Crouch was born to Dr. John W. Hirshfeld in Swarthmore, Pennsylvania. She earned her Bachelor of Science degree in physics from Williams College in 1990 before completing her PhD at Harvard University. When graduating from Williams College, Hirshfeld Crouch became valedictorian. Following her PhD, Hirshfeld Crouch remained at Harvard as a Postdoctoral Fellow in Physics Education and Applied Physics under the guidance of Eric Mazur.

== Career ==
Upon completing her Postdoctoral Fellowships, Hirshfeld Crouch joined the faculty at Swarthmore College in 2003 and earned tenure in 2009. At the time, she was an assistant professor of physics whose research focused on the technique of microphotoluminescence. Following her promotion to associate professor, Hirshfeld Crouch expanded her research interests to include protein-cell membrane interactions, nanoparticle physics, and physics education. She also became a principal investigator in a nine-institution National Science Foundation (NSF) grant for evaluation and dissemination of physics curriculum. Hirshfeld Crouch also became an editor for the journal Physical Review who later recognized her as one of their "Outstanding Referees" for 2016.

In 2017, Hirshfeld Crouch was promoted from associate professor to full professorship. At the same time, she was selected to oversee a grant from the NSF to measure how well students taking the Introductory Physics for Life Science (IPLS) course perform. Two years later, Hirshfeld Crouch was elected vice chair of the American Physical Society (APS) Forum on Education where she would help advise the organization's efforts in faculty development, K–12 teacher recruitment, setting national standards for undergraduate physics education, and establishing new initiatives.

In 2021, Hirshfeld Crouch was elected a Fellow of the American Physical Society for "her leadership in physics education research, focused on promoting the thoughtful use of interactive engagement for all students, for making physics relevant to life science majors, and supporting others through archiving of key resources, mentoring, and commitment to equity and inclusion in STEM."
