= Harold Brierley =

American business executive (born 1943)

Harold M. "Hal" Brierley
- Born: 1943
- Residence: Dallas, Texas
- Occupation: Executive Chairman / Founder of Brierley+Partners
- Known for: Pioneering AAdvantage
- Spouse: Diane Walden Brierley

Harold Brierley is an American business and marketing executive focused on loyalty programs.

== Background ==
Born in 1943, Brierley earned a B.S. in chemical engineering from the University of Maryland and an MBA from Harvard Business School with a Baker Scholar distinction. After graduating, Brierley worked as a research assistant for Harvard professor Charles M. Williams and co-founded Epsilon Data Management with former Harvard classmates in 1968.

== Business career ==
In 1980, a former classmate from Harvard hired Brierley to design American Airlines' traveler rewards program. Brierley later became the vice president of sales and marketing for Pan American World Airways in 1982, where he developed the WorldPass loyalty program. After a year at Pan Am, Brierley left to become the senior vice president of marketing for Continental Airlines.

== Entrepreneurial career ==
In 1985, Brierley opened Brierley+Partners (B+P), a loyalty program consultancy; and launched e-Rewards, Inc., a firm that collects consumer data for engineering loyalty programs, in 1999. In 2006, Brierley created e-Miles, Inc under the B+P umbrella.

Brierley teaches a course on the founding of Epsilon Data Management at Harvard Business School.
