= Alexander Falck =

American lawyer

Alexander D. Falck was lawyer and businessman. Falck served with the Elmira, New York law firm Stanchfield, Lovell, Falck & Sayles (named Sayles & Evans since 1945) from 1901 to 1918. Falck served as a director of Chemung Canal Trust Company (1917), president of Corning Glass Works (1920–1928), chairman of the board of Corning Glass Works (1928–1941), delegate to the Republican National Convention from New York (1940), and President of Arnot Ogden Memorial Hospital (1946–1948). There is a professorship of art named after Alexander D. Falck at Williams College, where he graduated from in 1899.
