= Carl W. Vogt =

Attorney, Academic Administrator, Aviation and Transportation Expert

- Occupations: Attorney, Academic Administrator
- Spouse: Margrit (Married July 27, 1968)
- Children: Erika, Bianca

Carl William Vogt is an American attorney and academic administrator who served as the fifteenth president of Williams College from July 1999 to June 2000. A Williams College alumnus of the class of 1958, Vogt specialized in transportation law, civil litigation, and aviation regulation during a career that included senior partnership at the international law firm Fulbright & Jaworski L.L.P., where he managed the Washington, D.C., office and contributed to firm-wide strategic planning.

== Military service ==
Vogt commissioned into the United States Marine Corps following his graduation from Williams College in 1958, serving as an officer until 1962. During this period, he trained and operated as a naval aviator, specializing in carrier-based jet fighter operations in the western Pacific theater.

== Legal career ==
Carl W. Vogt joined Fulbright & Jaworski L.L.P. in 1974, initially serving as counsel before advancing to partner. As a senior partner in the firm's Washington, D.C. office, he managed operations and was an elected member of the Policy Committee, overseeing strategic planning, budgeting, and firm-wide decisions. In addition to work in civil litigation, arbitration, and federal regulation, Carl specialized in transportation law.

== Public service ==
In 1991, Vogt was nominated by President George H. W. Bush to serve as a member of the Board of Directors of the National Railroad Passenger Corporation (Amtrak). In 1992, Vogt was appointed by President Bush as the chairman of the National Transportation Safety Board. In 1996, President Bill Clinton appointed Vogt to the White House Commission on Aviation Safety and Security, known as the Gore Commission, which investigated aviation safety issues including the crash of TWA Flight 800 and issued recommendations to enhance security and safety measures.

== Williams College ==
Carl W. Vogt, a member of the Williams College class of 1958 and an elected alumni trustee, was appointed interim president in October 1999 to succeed Harry C. Payne Jr. amid the board's search for a permanent leader. Vogt's tenure lasted approximately nine months, concluding in July 2000 when Morton Owen Schapiro assumed the presidency.

== Honors and awards ==
In 2005, Vogt received the Distinguished Statesman of Aviation Award from the National Aeronautic Association, recognizing his lifetime contributions to aviation safety and policy through leadership roles including his chairmanship of the National Transportation Safety Board.

In 2010, he was awarded the Donald D. Engen Aero Club Trophy for Aviation Excellence by the Aero Club of Washington, an honor presented annually to individuals exemplifying outstanding achievement in aviation.

He received the Kellogg Award by the Class of 1958 for his exemplary leadership and contributions to Williams College.
