= David Bellinger =

American academic

David C. Bellinger is professor of neurology at Harvard Medical School and professor in the Department of Environmental Health at the Harvard School of Public Health. He is also a Senior Research Associate in Neurology and a Senior Associate in Psychiatry at Boston Children's Hospital.

== Education ==
Bellinger received his BA from Williams College in psychology, his MSc in epidemiology from the Harvard School of Public Health, and his PhD in psychology from Cornell University.

== Research ==
Bellinger is known for his research on the neurotoxic effects of exposure to certain chemicals in children, as well as the effects of medical conditions that develop early in life on children. In 2006, he served on an Institute of Medicine committee that found that the benefits of seafood consumption outweighed the risk, and that the benefits of such consumption also exist for infants. In 2007, along with a number of other scientists, Bellinger warned about the adverse effects exposure to common chemicals can have on babies. One of his studies, published in 2012, concluded that 16.9 million IQ points have been lost due to exposure to organophosphates, which are often used as pesticides.
