= Richard Georgi =

- Education: Williams College, Harvard Business School
- Occupations: Real Estate Financier and Investor
- Years active: 1987–Present
- Known for: Co-Founding Partner, Chairman and Chief Investment Officer of Alpine Grove Partners; Co-Founding Partner, Managing Partner and Chairman of the Investment Committee of Grove International Partners; Co-Founding Partner and Managing Partner of Soros Real Estate Partners (1999-2004); Managing Director, Vice President, Associate at Goldman Sachs (1992-1999)
- Spouses: Sanae Ishikawa (2008 – Present); Maryl Georgi (1992 – 2006)
- Children: 4

Richard Georgi is an American Real Estate Financier and Investor.

== Early life and education ==
Georgi was born on March 8, 1963, and grew up in Boulder, Colorado. He received his bachelor's degree in Political Economics, cum laude, from Williams College where he ski raced NCAA Division 1. He also received an MBA, with distinction, from the Harvard Business School. Georgi began working at Goldman Sachs both before and after business school. In 1999 he left to launch Soros partners.

== Investment career ==
Georgi began his career in the Goldman Sachs' Real Estate Department in New York in 1987 and later transferred to Los Angeles, where he participated in over $2.5 billion of real estate-related sales and financings. Upon graduating from Harvard Business School in 1992, Georgi joined Goldman Sach's Real Estate Principal Investment Area (“REPIA”) shortly after its inception in New York, where he participated in approximately $1 billion of principal investment transactions in North America, including spearheading Goldman's “Whitehall” Funds’ successful hospitality and Canadian efforts.

Georgi moved to Europe in 1994. Working out of the London and Paris offices where under his leadership, Whitehall grew from an approximately $300 million portfolio into one of the leading European real estate private equity businesses managing approximately $5 billion of assets in five countries, including approximately $1 billion of invested equity. Goldman’s Whitehall Street Real Estate Fund investment business became a market leader in several European real estate sectors, including hospitality, non-performing loans, office development, privatizations and healthcare. Whitehall was widely recognized for its market penetration, innovation and size. Georgi was promoted to Executive Director in 1996 and Managing Director in 1998 and received two Goldman Sachs Innovation Awards.

Notable achievements include: Creating Gestion d’Actifs Haussmann, which became the preeminent NPL servicer in France; Leading the acquisition of the UK Government's Department of Social Security Estate and mobilization of Trillium; Developing a leading pan-European hospitality initiative, including Alliance Hôtellerie and Citadines; and Sponsoring a healthcare initiative which subsequently resulted in the public-to-private acquisition of Westminster Healthcare.

In 1999, Georgi left Goldman to establish Soros Real Estate Partners (SREP), a subsidiary of Soros Fund Management (SFM), and became responsible for Soros's worldwide real estate-related investments. Georgi led the fund raising for the $1 billion Soros Real Estate Investors (SREI) fund, at the time the largest first-time fund ever. As Managing Partner at SREP, Georgi initiated several operating platforms in Europe, drawing on previous relationships and forming new ones with proven operating partners. He also initiated SREP's Japanese investment program. He served on several European platform boards and on all the Japanese platform boards. Georgi also served on the SREI investment committee while at SFM.

Georgi was heavily involved in a number of other property deals in the UK around this time. In particular, he led the consortium named Mapeley that successfully acquired the Department of Inland Revenue’s real estate portfolio on a highly structured 20 year sale-leaseback valued at over £2 billion. Initially, Georgi also served as the Executive Chairman of Mapeley.

Georgi furthermore led the effort to establish a beachhead in Japan where the market was still recovering from its financial crisis in the early 1990s. SREI established one of the first foreign owned hotel management companies, Ishin Management, which was to acquire and manage hotels. Ishin grew to own nearly $1 billion of hotels at its peak and is today considered one of the leaders in the nation in managing limited service boutique hotels under the “b brand” in Japan.

In 2004, Georgi led the amicable spinout of the team in its entirety from SFM to create a newly formed independent firm, Grove International Partners, with Soros as its largest investor. Grove went on to raise $1.2 billion and $2.0 billion funds successively and become one of the largest independent real estate private equity firm with offices in Europe, Asia, and North America.

Georgi later established a subsidiary company, Alpine Grove Partners, to manage separate accounts with existing investors, initially focusing on distress in Spain. Both businesses were then re-branded Alpine Grove Partners. In total Alpine Grove and its affiliates have acquired over $20 billion of real estate in 12 countries with roughly $6 billion of invested equity through over 200 transactions totaling over 6500 assets.

== Board positions and philanthropy ==
Georgi has served on the Boards of several of the Fund portfolio companies including Trillium (UK), Alliance Hotellerie (FRA), Medgroup (ESP), Gestion d’Active Haussman (FRA), Mapeley (UK), Ishin Hospitality (JAP) and Intrawest (CAN).

Georgi has also been involved in numerous non-profit organizations including the National and International Boards of Big Brothers/ Big Sisters, the Real Asset Advisory Committee to the Williams College Endowment, the International Board of the Harvard Real Estate Academic Initiative and Habitat for Humanity International.
