= Ahmed Naseer =

Maldivian economist

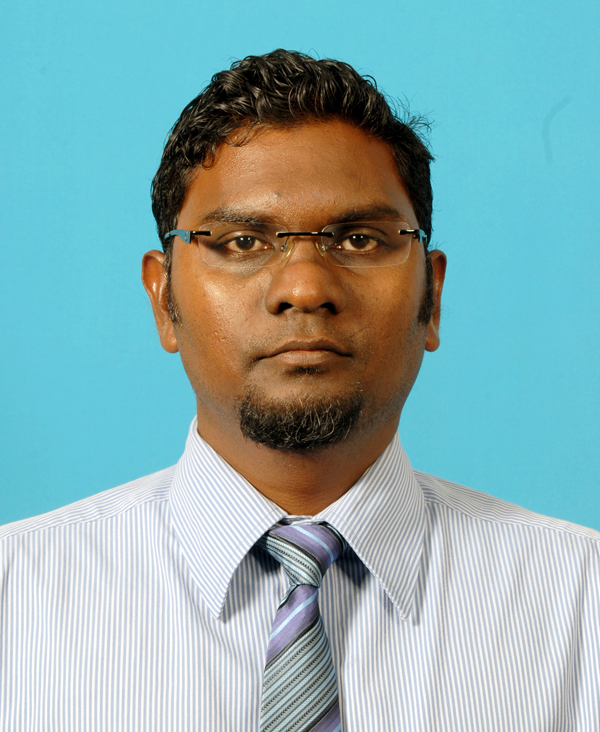
Ahmed Naseer

Ahmed Naseer (born October 31, 1975, in the Maldives) is a Maldivian economist and was the governor of the Maldives Monetary Authority from August 2017 to July 2019.

Naseer was raised in Malé, the capital of the Maldives, and attended Iskandar School and Majeediyya School. Upon completion of his GCE O levels, he joined the Science Education Center for his higher secondary education He received his bachelor's degree in Economics from the Curtin University in Perth, Western Australia. He also earned a diploma in education from Curtin. In 2007, Naseer was awarded a Fulbright Scholarship, and completed his MA in Economic Policy from Williams College in Massachusetts.

After three years in the education sector, he joined the Ministry of Finance and Treasury as an assistant director. Upon completion of his master's degree, he joined the Maldives Monetary Authority (MMA), the central bank of the country. He then was appointed for the government in April 2011 as a State Minister of Finance.

Naseer resigned from his government post towards the end of December 2011.

Naseer has been actively engaged in the tourism sector for the past five years, and is among the founders of the 'Guest House Association of Maldives'. Naseer has also been credited as the pioneer in the local island tourism in the Maldives, with the opening of his Guest House, WhiteShell Beach Inn in Maafushi Island as the first guest house to be opened in a local island.
