= Virtru =

Online privacy provider

- Company type: Private
- Founded: 2012
- Founder: John Ackerly; Will Ackerly
- Headquarters: Washington, DC
- Services: Email encryption
- Website: www.virtru.com

Virtru is a global data encryption and digital privacy provider founded in 2012. The company is headquartered in Washington, D.C.

== History ==
Virtru was co-founded by CEO John Ackerly and his brother and CTO, Will Ackerly, in 2012.

While working in national security, the co-founders experienced the unmet necessity for secure sharing firsthand. As a White House policy advisor during 9/11, John saw how secure data sharing and collaboration could have helped connect the dots and save lives. Will spent eight years at the National Security Agency (NSA) where he specialized in cloud analytic and security architecture and experienced similar frustrations with data silos in the intelligence community. During his tenure at the NSA, Will created the Trusted Data Format (TDF) so analysts and operators could confidently share data and collaborate across organizations.

== Funding ==
Virtru is privately funded with investments from ICONIQ Capital, Bessemer Venture Partners and other private investors. Iconiq Capital's founding partner, Will Griffith, and Bessemer partner David Cowan, co-founder of Verisign, serve on the company’s board of directors. Sonatype CEO and Former CEO at Sourcefire, Wayne Jackson, and Authentic8 CEO, Scott Petry, who founded the email security company Postini, are also Virtru board members.

On August 22, 2016, Virtru announced that it closed a $29 million Series A funding led by Bessemer Venture Partners with New Enterprise Associates, Soros Fund Management, Haystack Partners, Quadrant Capital Advisors, and Blue Delta Capital also participating in the round. On May 31, 2018, Virtru announced a $37 million Series B round led by Iconiq Capital with participation from returning investors Bessemer Venture Partners, New Enterprise Associates, Samsung, Blue Delta Capital, and Soros Fund Management.
