= Lucius Edwin Smith =

American lawyer, editor and clergyman

Lucius Edwin Smith (January 29, 1822 in Williamstown, Massachusetts – February 10, 1900 in Groton, Massachusetts) was a United States lawyer, editor, clergyman and educator.

== Biography ==
Smith graduated from Williams College in 1843, studied law in Williamstown, and was admitted to the bar in 1845. He served during 1847/8 as associate editor of the Hartford Courant, and in 1849 as associate editor, with Henry Wilson, of the Boston Republican. From 1849 to 1854 he was assistant corresponding secretary of the American Baptist Missionary Union, Boston. The next three years he spent in Newton Theological Seminary, where he graduated in 1857, and became in 1858 pastor of the Baptist church in Groton, Massachusetts, whence he was called in 1865 to the professorship of rhetoric, homiletics, and pastoral theology in Bucknell University, at Lewisburg, Pennsylvania. From 1868 to 1875, he was literary editor of the New York Examiner. In 1877 he became editor of the Watchman, Boston, of which journal he was associate editor beginning in 1881. While he was professor at Bucknell University, he edited the Baptist Quarterly. He received from Williams the degree of D.D. in 1869. Besides contributing numerous articles to periodicals, he edited Heroes and Martyrs of the Modern Missionary Enterprise (Hartford, Conn., 1852).
