= John J. Gilbert =

2003 A.C. Redfield Lifetime Achievement Award recipient

John J. Gilbert (July 18, 1937) is an American biologist. He taught at Princeton University and Dartmouth College, and received the 2003 A.C. Redfield Lifetime Achievement Award. He is currently professor emeritus of biology at Dartmouth.

== Education ==
Gilbert received a B.A. (with Honors) in Biology, from Williams College (1959), a Ph.D. in Biology from Williams College (1963) and an NIH Postdoctoral Fellow from the Department of Zoology at the University of Washington (1963–64).

== Awards and recognition ==
In 2003 Gilbert received the lifetime award "For developing and sustaining the field of rotifer ecology and biology; for successful mentorship for more than a quarter century; and for vital service contributions to the national and international communities of limnologists and oceanographers."

Between 1973 and 1978 he was the recipient of the NIH Career Development Award.

== Academic positions ==
Gilbert has held the following teaching roles in Biology: he was the assistant professor in the Department of Biology at Princeton University between 1964 and 1966, at the Department of Biological Sciences at Dartmouth College between 1966 and 1969 (where for the following five years he held the role following his retirement, he retired he earned the status of professor emeritus).

In 1997 Gilbert received the William Evans Visiting Fellowship from the Department of Zoology at the University of Otago, New Zealand.

== Scientific associations ==
Gilbert has been a member of the following scientific associations: the American Society of Zoologists (between 1964 and 1988), the American Association for the Advancement of Science (which he joined in 1963 and was also a Fellow), the Ecological Society of America and the American Society of Limnology and Oceanography, the International Association of Theoretical and Applied Limnology (all of which he joined in 1964).
