= Hunt Hawkins =

American poet

- Education: Williams College; Stanford University
- Occupation: Poet
- Writing career
- Notable awards: Agnes Lynch Starrett Poetry Prize (1992)

Hunt Hawkins is an American poet. He graduated from Williams College, Phi Beta Kappa, and from Stanford University. He taught at Florida State University. He teaches at University of South Florida. His work appears in Apalachee Quarterly, Georgia Review, Minnesota Review, Poetry, Southern Review, TriQuarterly. Hawkins was the 1992 recipient of the Agnes Lynch Starrett Poetry Prize.

== Works ==
=== Non-fiction ===
- Hunt Hawkins, Brian W. Shaffer, ed. (2002). Teaching Approaches to Joseph Conrad's "Heart of Darkness" and "The Secret Sharer". Modern Language Association of America. ISBN 978-0-87352-902-0.
- Joseph Conrad and Mark Twain on the Congo Free State. 1976.

=== Poetry ===
- The Domestic Life. University of Pittsburgh Press. 1994. ISBN 978-0-8229-3770-8.
- A New Geography of Poetry (University of Arkansas Press, 1992)
