= Romel V. Wallen =

Jamaican sports agent (born 1980)

Romel Vaughn Wallen (born 29 June 1980) is a Jamaican former footballer. He is now a FIFA-licensed broker, based in the United Kingdom. He has emerged as a top sports agent for Caribbean football players who play professionally in United States and Europe. "Romel Wallen vs Phil Graham". Wallen brokered the #1 pick in the 2014 MLS SuperDraft.

== Football career ==
Youth international and collegiate player; Wallen earned 21 caps representing Jamaica, primarily under the guidance of Jamaica's only FIFA World Cup coach, Brazilian, René Simões. Competed in the 1995–96 CONCACAF Under-17 Championship, hosted in Trinidad.

== Education ==
Wallen was born in Kingston, Jamaica. A Wolmer's Schools graduate, also studied in United States, where he graduated from The Hotchkiss School in June 2000. After gaining a scholarship to attend #1 US liberal arts college, Williams College, he earned a bachelor's degree (BA) in Political Science and Psychology (2004).

== Sports management ==
Wallen is founder of London-based sports brokerage, Pro Goals Sports Capital.
