= Daniel I. Bolnick =

American evolutionary biologist

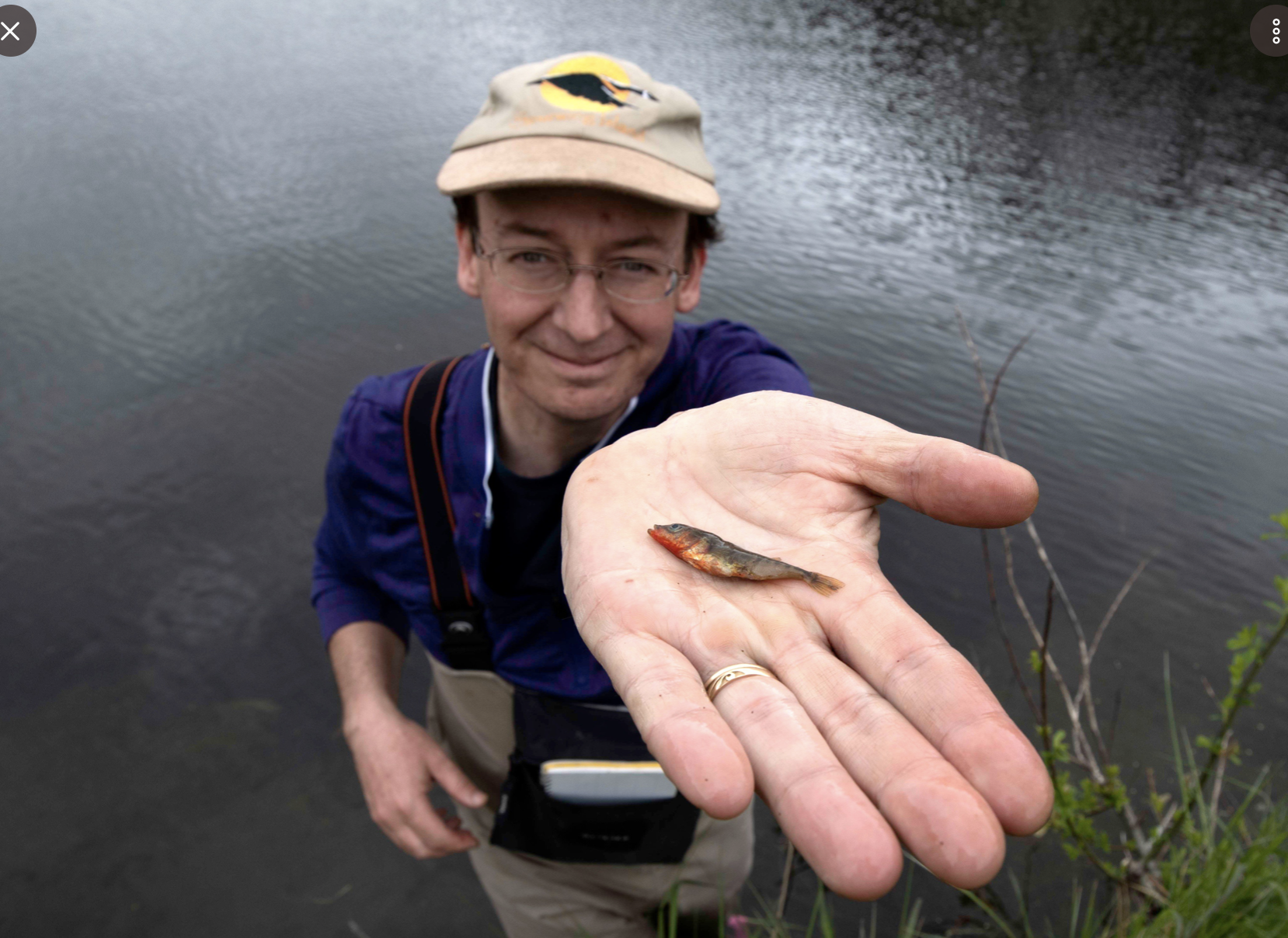
- Born: Durham, North Carolina, US
- Occupation: Professor
- Awards: Dobzhansky Prize from the Society for the Study of Evolution; Young Investigator Prize from the American Society of Naturalists; Mercer Award from the Ecological Society of America; David Starr Jordan Prize from Stanford, Cornell, and Indiana Universities; O'Donnell Prize from the Texas Academy of Medicine Science Engineering and Technology; Member, Connecticut Academy of Science and Engineering;

Academic background
- Education: BA, 1996, Williams College; PhD, 2003, University of California, Davis
- Thesis: The diversifying effect of intraspecific competition (2003)
- Website: bolnicklab.wordpress.com

Daniel I. Bolnick is an American evolutionary biologist. He is a full professor at the University of Connecticut. He is currently the president of The American Society of Naturalists, and was the editor-in-chief of the society's journal The American Naturalist from 2017-2023.

== Early life and education ==
Bolnick was born in Durham North Carolina, to Bruce and Doreen Bolnick. His father Bruce was an economics professor and an alumnus of Yale University and was treasurer of the committee that organized Coed Week in the fall of 1968. His mother Doreen was a librarian and is an artist. Bolnick was raised in Durham, North Carolina; Washington, DC; Jakarta, Indonesia; and Reading, Massachusetts, where he became interested in natural history. He finished his final year of high school at the International School of Lusaka in Zambia.

Bolnick earned his Bachelor of Arts degree from Williams College in 1996 and his PhD from the University of California, Davis (UC Davis) in 2003. He received a Fulbright grant upon graduating from Williams College but declined to participate, instead joining the Peace Corps. He taught high school biology and math for two years in Same, Tanzania, for the US Peace Corps before starting his graduate studies. He obtained his PhD at the University of California at Davis, initially studying with Art Woods, then Les Gottlieb, before ending up working with Peter Wainwright. In 2005, Bolnick was the co-recipient of the George Mercer Award for a single outstanding paper in ecology published during the past two years. His co-authored paper, "The ecology of individuals: incidence and implications of individual specialization", was published while he was a graduate student at UC Davis.

== Career ==
Near the end of his PhD studies in 2003, Bolnick accepted his first faculty position at the University of Texas at Austin's (UT) Department of Integrative Biology, where he began in Fall 2004. He completed a brief postdoc with Michael Turelli and Peter Wainwright before beginning his faculty position. During his tenure at UT, he studied threespine stickleback fish in lakes and streams around Vancouver Island, British Columbia to see how species evolve. He specifically focused on lakes and streams that were created at the end of the last Ice age. He also studied how parasites and their hosts co-evolve, and how their antagonism shapes variation in host immunity. In recognition of his research, he was a David and Lucile Packard Foundation 2007 Fellow and received a 6-year fellowship as a Howard Hughes Medical Institute's Early Career Scientist from 2009 to 2015.

Bolnick established his own research laboratory which led projects focusing on "ecological interactions and the maintenance of genetic variation within populations and uses natural variation in wild fish populations as a tool to understand the evolution of host-parasite interactions and immune function." He was subsequently nominated for the 2015 David Starr Jordan Prize for his "innovative contributions to the study of evolution, ecology, population and organismal biology." He was the last recipient of this prize, which was discontinued in 2020 due to the racist eugenics legacy of D.S. Jordan. In 2016 Bolnick was the recipient of the O'Donnell Award from The Academy of Medicine, Engineering & Science of Texas, an award meant to recognize and promote outstanding scientific achievements of state researchers.

Bolnick served as chair of the University of Texas at Austin's Graduate Program from 2014 until 2017 and was appointed editor-in-chief of the journal The American Naturalist. Upon stepping down as chair, he joined the Department of Ecology and Evolutionary Biology at the University of Connecticut as a full professor. During the COVID-19 pandemic in North America, like many field biologists Bolnick was unable to conduct field work with his regular research team and sought out locals who lived in the area he was studying for assistance.

== Awards ==
In 2015 he received the Cornell's David Starr Jordan Prize.
