= David Paresky =

American businessman

- Born: 1938 (age 87–88); Boston, Massachusetts
- Occupation: Businessman

David Paresky is a retired American businessman, who formerly worked in the travel service sector. He is also a well-known philanthropist.

== Early life ==
Paresky was born in Boston, Massachusetts in 1938. He grew up in Burlington, Vermont. Paresky attended Phillips Academy on a scholarship before attending Williams College, also as a scholarship student. He graduated from Williams in 1960 and went on to receive his J.D. from Harvard University in 1963 and then his MBA from Harvard in 1965.

== Career ==
Paresky began his tenure in travel services at Phillips Academy, where he organized spring break trips to Bermuda for students. Later, Paresky turned this interest into a profitable career. After graduation from Harvard, Paresky began Crimson Travel, a successful company that became the largest travel company in the New England region.

Crimson Travel merged with Heritage Travel and then with Thomas Cook Travel, becoming ultimately one of the largest travel companies in the United States. Thomas Cook Travel was founded by Thomas Cook in 1841 in England and survived over the years before moving operations to the United States. American Express purchased Thomas Cook's travel offices in the United States in 1994, which were owned by Paresky and his wife.

== Philanthropy ==
Paresky has donated significant portions of money to both Phillips Academy and Williams College in order to build new student facilities. At Williams, the student center built in 2006 is named Paresky Center in his name after he donated $15.75 million to the school. At Phillips Academy, Paresky's $10 million donation was used to renovate its main dining hall, renamed Paresky Commons in 2008.

== Personal life ==
Paresky currently lives in Fisher Island, Florida with his wife Linda.

He received Williams College's Bicentennial Medal in 2012.

Paresky was one of the investors exploited by Bernie Madoff's Ponzi scheme, which came to light in 2008.
