= Gamaliel S. Olds =

Congregational minister

- Born: February 11, 1777; Tolland
- Died: June 13, 1848 (aged 71); Circleville
- Alma mater: Williams College
- Occupation: Minister
- Employer: Amherst College; University of Georgia; University of Vermont; Williams College

Gamaliel Smith Olds (1777–1848) was an American Congregational minister.

== Life ==
Olds was born February 11, 1777, in Tolland, Massachusetts. He graduated from Williams College in 1801; held the position of tutor from 1803 to 1805; and in 1806 was elected professor of mathematics and natural philosophy, but resigned in 1808, and studied theology, and was ordained co-pastor in Greenfield, Massachusetts, November 19, 1813, where he remained until 1816. In 1819 he was chosen professor of mathematics and natural philosophy at the University of Vermont; and in 1821 professor of the same studies in Amherst College. Some years afterwards he filled the same chair at the University of Georgia. He died from the effects of an accident at Circleville, Ohio on June 13, 1848. Olds published an Inaugural Oration at Williams College (1806); The Substance of several Sermons upon the subjects of Episcopacy and Presbyterian Purity (1815); and Statement of Facts relative to the Appointment to the Office of Professor of Chemistry in Middlebury College (1818).
