= Eric Stein =

US Department of Treasury official, 2009–2010

Eric Stein is the former Deputy Assistant Secretary for Consumer Protection at the U.S. Department of Treasury. He was nominated in 2009 by President Barack Obama, and resigned in 2010.

== Education and career ==
Prior to his appointment to the US Treasury Department, Stein was senior vice president of the Center for Responsible Lending (CRL), and chief operating officer of a related organization, the Center for Community Self-Help. During his time at the CRL, Stein testified in Congress on predatory mortgage lending and foreclosure prevention.

Stein has also worked for Congressman David Price (D-NC), Fourth Circuit Court of Appeals Judge Sam J. Ervin III, and CASA, a nonprofit organization in North Carolina that helps persons with disabilities acquire housing.

In November 2020, Stein was named a volunteer member of the Joe Biden presidential transition Agency Review Team to support transition efforts related to the Department of Housing and Urban Development and the Federal Housing Finance Agency.

Stein received his Bachelor of Arts from Williams College and his law degree from Yale Law.
