= Jason Priest =

American politician from Montana (born 1968)

Member of the Montana Senate from the 30th district
- In office 2011 - 2015

Personal details
- Born: July 17, 1968 (age 58) Red Lodge, Montana, U.S.
- Party: Republican
- Education: Williams College
- Occupation: Politician, corporate executive

Jason Priest (born July 17, 1968) is an American businessman and former politician. A member of the Republican Party, he served in the Montana Legislature, representing Senate District 30 from 2011 to 2015.

Priest pled guilty to four counts of assault, family assault, and resisting arrest involving his four year old daughter, his wife and her boyfriend. He was sentenced to one year, deferred, and $11,000 in fees and fines. He did not run for re-election. (2014)

Priest was raised in Red Lodge, Montana. He attended Red Lodge Public Schools and Aspen Country Day School in Aspen, Colorado. He attended Williams College in Williamstown, Massachusetts and received a Bachelor of Arts degree in political economy.

Priest is currently the owner of Bold Beauty Academy in Billings, Montana and Optimal Auctions of Round Rock, Texas and holds executive titles with New Rock Telecom Ventures and Hamilton Venture Holdings. His previous positions include CEO of Medipent LLC; Chief Operating Officer and Founder at Dash.com; Director at MaxLink; President at US WaveLink; and Vice President of Finance at Islands Restaurants.

== Legislative Action ==
During the 63rd Session of the Montana Legislature, Priest's legislative outline confirmed primary sponsorship of legislature including SB97 & SB98 "Revise Redistricting Laws to Reduce the Number of House and Senate Seats", SB75 "Allow Donation of Hunting Licenses for Disabled Veterans", SB385 "Reduce Sales Tax Rates and Redistribute Proceeds to Provide Funding For Tourism" and a number of bills confirming the Montana Governor's appointees to health related boards.

== Montana Growth Network Investigation ==
Priest is the founder of the Montana Growth Network, a 501c4 political lobbying organization in Montana. It is the primary donor to the Western Tradition Partnership, now known as the American Tradition Partnership. It is funded by confidential individual and corporate donors.

In 2013, Priest came under scrutiny for potentially receiving donations from out-of-state and undisclosed individuals and corporations. He refused to disclose his donor base stating his right to do so under 501c4 laws protecting the organization based in Red Lodge, Montana. His organization's activity has led to a "dark money" scandal overshadowing 2013 politics in the state of Montana. As reported in the Independent Record, Missoulian and by Michael Beckel/Political Integrity, Priest financed a radio ad and a three piece printed mailer sent to voters supporting his own selection, and that of his Board of Directors, of a 2012 Montana Supreme Court Judge candidate that contained misleading editorial content and was not appropriately registered with the Montana Commissioner on Political Practices.

As a state senator, Priest, through his business stimulus non-profit, Montana Growth Network, spent more money on a non-partisan election to assist the election of a Montana Supreme Court Judge than the candidate herself had raised for her own election campaign programs. A number of formal complaints were filed with the State of Montana prompting Governor Steve Bullock and other elected Montana Senators, representatives and state election officials to address the issue of election campaign contribution reform, donor transparency and contribution limits. Both Republicans and Democrats raised concerns about Montana Growth Network's activity.

Emails obtained and published by the Great Falls Tribune in January 2013 named Priest as part of a secretive effort by conservative Republicans in the Montana legislature to quash bills by more moderate Republicans. Emails were released by an unnamed source. Priest, along with several other Republican Senators, had targeted specific fellow Republicans as those to work against during the 2013 Montana legislative session. The efforts resulted in political and legislative gridlock with a "crossover coalition" of Republicans defeating key bills proposed by Priest.
