= Steven Goode (lawyer) =

American lawyer

Steven Goode is an American lawyer, currently the W. James Kronzer Chair and Distinguished Teacher Professor at University of Texas School of Law, previously also the Fulbright & Jaworski Professor, G. Rollie White Teaching Excellence Chair and John Jeffers Research Chair.
