= Edward Bartow =

American chemist (1870–1958)

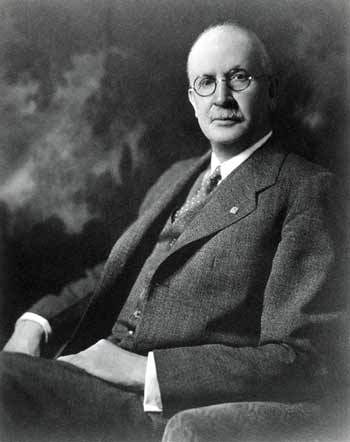
- Born: January 12, 1870; Glenham, New York
- Died: April 12, 1958 (aged 88); Iowa City, Iowa
- Education: BS, Williams College, 1892; PhD, University of Göttingen, Germany, 1895.
- Occupations: Professor of chemistry and director of the Illinois Water Survey
- Known for: Advances in chemistry of drinking water purification and wastewater treatment
- Awards: Honorary D.Sc. from Williams College, 1923; Water Industry Hall of Fame, American Water Works Association, 1971.

Edward Bartow (January 12, 1870 – April 12, 1958) was an American chemist and an expert in the field of sanitary chemistry. His career extended from 1897 to 1958 and he is best known for his work in drinking water purification and wastewater treatment. He was well known as an educator, and his many students went on to leadership positions in the fields of sanitary chemistry and engineering.

== Early life and education ==
Bartow was born in Glenham, New York, on January 12, 1870. His early education took place at the Glenham School and at the Mount Beacon Academy at Fishkill, New York. He graduated from Williams College in 1892 with a degree in mathematics and science and he was elected to Phi Beta Kappa that same year. He attended the University of Göttingen and studied under Otto Wallach who would later receive the Nobel Prize in chemistry for his work on terpenes. Bartow was awarded a PhD in organic chemistry in 1895 for his thesis, which dealt with derivatives of meta-isocymene.

== World War I service ==
Bartow saw service in World War I with the Sanitary Corps of the American Expeditionary Forces from 1917 to 1918. He was originally commissioned as a major and was promoted to lieutenant colonel before the end of his service. He directed the work of 80 officers and enlisted men who were responsible for providing safe drinking water and proper sanitation for U.S. forces. He devised a system of superchlorination of Seine River water followed by dechlorination with sulfur dioxide. In addition, he established a system of eleven analytical laboratories and several mobile units to keep the quality of drinking water for service men under control. He received the Médaille d'honneur des épidémies in silver from the French government for his work preventing serious disease outbreaks.

== Career ==
He began his career as an instructor of chemistry at Williams College about 1896. His first academic appointment was as an assistant professor of chemistry at the University of Kansas. He taught there from 1897 to 1905. While in Kansas, he worked with the U.S. Geological Survey analyzing the waters of southeastern part of the state.

His next position was as director of the Illinois State Water Survey. He also held the title of professor of sanitary chemistry at the University of Illinois from 1905 to 1920. He led efforts to eliminate typhoid fever by developing treatment methodologies for water purification. In 1914, he began the first large-scale investigations of the new sewage treatment process called activated sludge. A bronze plaque was placed on the grounds of the Champaign-Urbana Sanitary District to commemorate the work on this process done by Bartow and his colleagues. The Illinois State Water Survey became well known for producing high quality work and the fourteen volumes of bulletins and reports published during his tenure are classics in the field of sanitary chemistry and engineering.

From 1920 until his retirement in 1940, he was professor of chemistry at the University of Iowa. He significantly enhanced the department and when he left, the number of PhD degrees awarded totaled 240 in chemistry and chemical engineering.

== Personal life ==
On September 3, 1895, he married Alice Abbot of Rochester, New York. They had one daughter, Virginia, who was born in 1897. Virginia became a well-known chemistry professor in her own right.

== Professional associations and commissions ==
Bartow was active in numerous professional associations and he served on numerous national and international commissions. By his own count, he had memberships in 41 societies, clubs and fraternities. He was president of the Kansas Academy of Science in 1904. His involvement with the American Water Works Association was long and committed. He helped form what would become the Illinois Section of AWWA in 1909 and he became the Section Secretary from 1915 to 1919. In 1922, he was elected as president of AWWA.

He was a member and director of the American Institute of Chemical Engineers from 1923 to 1925 and 1936–1939. In 1934, he was elected as president of the Iowa Academy of Science. From 1934 to 1938, he was the U.S. representative and vice president of the International Chemical Union. Bartow was a long-time member of the American Chemical Society. He served on numerous committees and was instrumental in founding the Division of Water, Sewage and Sanitary Chemistry. He served for three years as chairman of the Division. In 1934, he was elected as president of the ACS.

As a member of the American Public Health Association, he was chairman of its laboratory section and supervised several editions of its Standard Methods of Water Analysis. Qualified through his consulting work, he became a member of the sanitary engineering division of American Society of Civil Engineers, served on its executive committee for five years and was its chairman for two years.

== Honors and awards ==
Bartow received many honors including the French Médaille d'honneur des épidémies in silver and an honorary D.Sc. from Williams College in 1923. Several societies honored him with life memberships. In 1971, he was inducted into the American Water Works Association Water Industry Hall of Fame.

== Limited list of publications ==
- Bartow, Edward. (1903–04). “Water-Supplies of Southeastern Kansas.” Transactions of the Kansas Academy of Science. 19: (1903-1904): 39–48.
- Bartow, Edward and H.C. Allen. (1903–04). “A New Derivative of Diazo-Amido-Benzene.” Transactions of the Kansas Academy of Science. 19: (1903-1904): 69–70.
- Bartow, Edward. (1914). “Laboratory Control of Water Supplies.” Journal AWWA. 1:4(December 1914): 720–6.
- Bartow, Edward. (1916). “The Latest Method of Sewage Treatment.” Journal AWWA. 3:2(June 1916): 327–45.
- Jackson, Daniel D., Edward Wegmann and Edward Bartow. (1916). “Water Softening by Filtration Through Artificial Zeolite.” Journal AWWA. 3:2(June 1916): 423–33.
- Warren, R.M. and Edward Bartow. (1924). “Taste and Odor in Chlorinated Water.” Journal AWWA. 11:4(July 1924): 881–6.
- Bartow, Edward. (1930). “Electro-Osmose Treatment of Boiler Waters.” Journal AWWA. 22:8(August 1930): 1112–21.
- Bartow, Edward. (1936). “Progress in Sanitation.” Science. 84:2180(October 9, 1936): 317–22.
