= Frank M. Wolzencraft =

American lawyer (died 1994)

- Died: March 25, 1994 (aged 70); Carmel, California, U.S.
- Education: Williams College; Yale Law School
- Occupations: Lawyer; assistant attorney general
- Spouse: Shirley
- Children: 3

Frank M. Wozencraft (died March 25, 1994) was a Houston lawyer and served as assistant attorney general under President Lyndon B. Johnson.

== Early life ==
Frank M. Wozencraft was educated at Williams College and Yale Law School receiving his law degree from the latter in 1949. He was a clerk for Justice Hugo Black of the United States Supreme Court.

== Career ==
In 1950, Wozencraft joined the Houston law firm Baker & Botts. He specialized in business law and would later serve as senior partner. He retired around 1991. He was assistant attorney general under President Lyndon B. Johnson. He was in charge of the office of legal counsel at the United States Department of Justice.

== Personal life ==
Wozencraft married Shirley. They had two sons and one daughter, Frank M. Jr., George W. and Ann. He lived in Houston.

Wozencraft died of pneumonia on March 25, 1994, aged 70, while on vacation in Carmel, California.
