= Henry F. C. Nichols =

American politician

Henry Franklin Clough "F. C." Nichols (1833–1890) was a member of the Wisconsin State Assembly.

== Biography ==
Nichols was born on February 9, 1833, in Kingston, New Hampshire. He graduated from Pembroke Academy in Pembroke, New Hampshire. In 1859, he graduated from Williams College. After attending Union Theological Seminary, Nichols graduated from Andover Theological Seminary in 1864. He later became a trustee and clerk of a Congregational church.

On May 12, 1868, Nichols married Nettie Williams. They would have six children. Nettie was niece of Isaac Hill, a member of the United States Senate and Governor of New Hampshire.

== Political career ==
Nichols was a member of the Assembly in 1872, 1873, and 1879. Other positions he held include President (similar to Mayor) and member of the Village Board (similar to city council) of New Lisbon, Wisconsin and Chairman of the County Board of Supervisors of Juneau County, Wisconsin. He was a Republican. He died on June 4, 1890, of heart disease in West Superior, Wisconsin.
