= John C. Keeler =

American politician

John Clarence Keeler (February 17, 1851 – October 19, 1899) was an American lawyer and politician from New York.

== Life ==
Keeler was born on February 17, 1851, in Malone, New York. He was the son of Carlos C. Keeler and Amanda Russell. He was a descendant of Ralph Keeler. He attended the Franklin Academy in Malone, graduating from there in 1869.

Keeler attended Williams College, graduating from there in 1873. He then entered St. Lawrence University law department. After the university ended its law department, he studied law under Judge William H. Sawyer and Leslie W. Russell. In 1874, he moved to Milwaukee, Wisconsin, where he was admitted to the state bar and worked in the law office of James G. Jenkins. In December 1874, he moved to New York City.

Keeler was admitted to the New York bar in January 1875. From 1875 to 1877, he worked as a clerk for the New York County District Attorney. In 1877, he moved to Canton and started practicing law there. He was a stockholder and director of the First National Bank at Canton. From 1882 to 1883, he was Deputy Attorney General of New York.

In 1890, Keeler was elected to the New York State Assembly as a Republican, representing the St. Lawrence County 2nd District. He served in the Assembly in 1891 and 1892.

Keeler married Ada H. Servis (1859–1883) in 1878. After she died, he married Mattie Howard Lynde in 1888. He had three sons, John Russell, Benjamin Carlos, and Howard Lynde.

Keeler died in a private New York City hospital from heart disease and pneumonia on October 19, 1899. He was buried in the Keeler family plot in Kensico Cemetery.

New York State Assembly
Preceded by William H. Kimball	New York State Assembly; St. Lawrence County, 2nd District; 1891–1892	Succeeded by District Abolished
