= Nathaniel Herrick Griffin =

American Presbyterian minister (1814–1876)

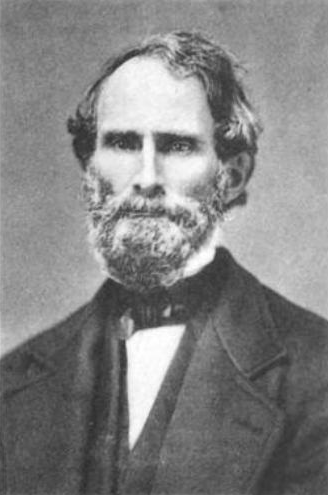
- Born: December 28, 1814; Southampton
- Died: October 16, 1876 (aged 61); Williamstown
- Alma mater: Williams College; Princeton Theological Seminary
- Occupation: Priest; educator; librarian
- Employer: Williams College
- Children: Solomon Bulkley Griffin

Nathaniel Herrick Griffin, D.D. (28 December 1814 – 16 October 1876) was an American Presbyterian minister. Griffin was born at Southampton, L.I., December 28, 1814. He graduated from Williams College, Mass., in 1834; spent two years in Princeton Theological Seminary; was a tutor in his alma mater in 1836-37; became thereafter stated supply successively at Westhampton, N.Y., and at Franklin; was ordained by the Presbytery June 27, 1839; was pastor at Delhi; acted as assistant professor in Williams College (1841–42), and: as a teacher in Brooklyn (1843–46), professor of Latin and Greek in Williams College (1846–53), of Greek (185357), a teacher in Williamstown, Mass. (1857–68), librarian there (1868-76), and died in that place, October 16, 1876. See Genesis Cat. of Princeton Theol. Sem. 1881, page 99.
