= Matthias Nicoll Jr. =

American physician

Matthias Nicoll Jr. (February 12, 1868 – May 13, 1941) was an American physician and New York State Health Commissioner.

== Early life and education ==
Nicoll was born on February 12, 1868, in New York City, New York, the son of Matthias Nicoll and Alice Mary Large.

Nicoll attended the Berkeley School in New York. In 1885, he began attending Williams College, where he was a member of the Kappa Alpha Society. He graduated from Williams College with a B.A. in 1889. He then went to the New York College of Physicians and Surgeons later that year and graduated from there with an M.D. in 1892.

== Career ==
=== Early career ===
He was Resident Physician of the Chambers Street Hospital in New York City from 1893 to 1895, followed by Resident Physician of the New York Foundling Hospital from 1896 to 1897. From 1897 to 1914, he had a private practice that specialized in pediatrics and infectious diseases. He also worked during that time as pathologist and attending physician of the New York Foundling Hospital, pathologist of the New York Infant Asylum, attending physician of the Seton Hospital for tuberculosis, attending physician (later consulting physician) of Willard Parker Hospital, attending physician of University and Bellevue O. P. D. Pediatrics, attending physician of Bellevue Hospital O. P. D. Pediatrics, and clinical professor of infectious diseases at Bellevue Medical School.

=== New York City Department of Health ===
Nicoll worked under Dr. William H. Park, the head of New York City Department of Health's research laboratory, as assistant director and chief of the department's division of diagnosis. Together, they performed a series of experiments of guinea pigs that demonstrated the efficacy of tetanus anti-toxin was greatly increased through intraspinal injection, which won them wide scientific acclaim. He was an authority and author of many scientific articles on infectious diseases, laboratory research, and public health administration. He was especially known for his work related to treatment of tetanus. He was a trustee of the State Hospital for Tuberculosis in Raybrook, a fellow of the New York Academy of Medicine and the American Public Health Association, and an executive committee member of the State and Provincial Health Authorities. He was also vice-president of the American Pediatric Society.

In 1915, Nicoll was appointed director of the New York State Department of Health's division of public health education. In 1916, he became secretary of the department. In 1917, he was the Department's deputy.

=== New York City Health Commissioner ===
In 1923, when State Commissioner of Health Dr. Hermann Biggs (an associate of Nicoll back in the New York City Health Department) died, Governor Al Smith appointed Nicoll to become the new Commissioner of Health. Under Nicoll, the department launched a five-year campaign to control diphtheria in the state, significantly reducing morbidity and mortality. He also led a professional education campaign for physicians doing obstetrical work to reduce maternal mortality, worked to prevent or overcome stream pollution from sewage, and passed initiatives to purify a large number of water supplies.

=== Later career ===
In 1930, shortly after Governor Franklin D. Roosevelt reappointed him Health Commissioner, he resigned to become head of the new Westchester County Health Department. In the new position, he focused heavily on safeguarding the milk supply and eliminating pollution in the Long Island Sound and the Hudson River. Under him, the Westchester County Health Department was praised by federal and state officials as a model. He retired from the office in 1938, when he reached the mandatory retirement age.

== Personal life ==
Nicoll was a member of the University Club of New York. In 1899, he married Alice Maud Wing. Their children were Alice Mary, Lillian, and Nancy Fay.

== Death ==
Nicoll died at his home in Rye from a heart attack on May 13, 1941. He was buried in Woodlawn Cemetery in the Bronx.
