= Applied Genetic Technologies Corporation =

Biotechnology company

- Type: Public
- Traded as: Nasdaq: AGTC; Russell Microcap Index component
- Industry: Biotechnology
- Founded: January 19, 1999; 27 years ago
- Headquarters: Alachua, Florida, United States
- Key people: Susan B. Washer; (president & CEO); William A. Sullivan (CFO)
- Revenue: ▼US$ 24.19 million; (FY JUN 30, 2018)
- Operating income: ▼US$ -22.38 million; (FY JUN 30, 2018)
- Net income: ▼US$ -21.30 million; (FY JUN 30, 2018)
- Total assets: ▼US$ 118.53 million; (FY JUN 30, 2018)
- Total equity: ▼US$ 99.18 million; (FY JUN 30, 2018)
- Number of employees: 78; (FY JUN 30, 2018)
- Website: AGTC.com

The Applied Genetic Technologies Corporation was a publicly traded biotechnology company that is part of the NASDAQ Biotechnology Index. It was founded in 1999 and has its headquarters in Alachua, Florida. In late June 2019, the company announced the appointment of Global Clinical and Medical Affairs Veteran, Theresa G.H. Heah, M.D., M.B.A., to Join as Chief Medical Officer.

The company focuses on ophthalmologic genetic diseases. The company's technologies are aimed at products that might have the potential to treat achromatopsia, X-linked retinoschisis, X-linked retinitis pigmentosa, and age-related macular degeneration. The company has six products in various stages of development; as of 2016, none had yet been approved.

In January 2017, AGTC entered into a strategic research and development collaboration with Bionic Sight, an innovator in the emerging field of optogenetics and retinal coding. Through the collaboration, AGTC and Bionic Sight will to develop a new optogenetic therapy that leverages AGTC's experience in gene therapy and ophthalmology.

On January 9, 2020, the company reported positive results from a Phase 1/2 trial for its investigational gene therapy for retinitis pigmentosa. A few weeks later, the company reported interim six-month data from the dose-escalation cohorts of its ongoing Phase 1/2 clinical programs in patients with achromatopsia due to mutation in the ACHM CNGB3 or ACHM CNGA3 genes. Applied Genetic Technologies Corporation is a patient partner within the blinding eye disease and rare disease community, including organizations like Foundation for Fighting Blindness and Global Genes.

The company was acquired by Syncona, Dec 1 2022.
