= Steven S. Rogers =

American academic

- Born: c. 1957
- Education: Williams College; Harvard Business School
- Occupation: Academic
- Employer: Harvard Business School

Steven S. Rogers (born c. 1957) is an American academic. He is retired and a former faculty member at his alma mater, Harvard Business School. At HBS he held the endowed professorship called the MBA Class of 1957 Senior Lecturer of Business Administration at the Harvard Business School. He is the author of three books, Entrepreneurial Finance, A Letter to My White Friends, and Successful Black Entrepreneurs. He is the author of 14 business cases featuring Black American businesspeople.

== Early life ==
Steven S. Rogers was born in 1957. He grew up on the South Side of Chicago. He graduated from Williams College, and he earned a master in business administration from the Harvard Business School in 1985.

== Career ==
Rogers taught at Northwestern University's Kellogg School of Management. Prior to retiring in 2018 he was the MBA Class of 1957 Senior Lecturer of Business Administration at the Harvard Business School. He was a visiting professor at the United States Military Academy in 2016.

Rogers is the co-author of a book, author of two books and the author of 14 business cases featuring Black-American businesspeople.

Rogers is a limited partner in private equity firms OCA Venture Partners.and Fairview Capital.

He is also an investor in The Chicago Sky in the WNBA and Nubian Ascends, a real estate development project in Roxbury, Mass

== Works ==
- Rogers, Steven; Makonnen, Roza (2014). Entrepreneurial Finance: Finance and Business Strategies for the Serious Entrepreneur. New York: McGraw-Hill. ISBN 9780071825399. OCLC 981320603.
