= Neil Fiske =

Neil Fiske was CEO of Gap Brand from June 2018 to January 2020. He was the president, chief executive officer and director of Eddie Bauer Holdings, Inc. from 2007 to 2012. Before Eddie Bauer, Fiske was chief executive officer of the Bath and Body Works, a division of Limited Brands. He was recognized as "Marketer of the Year" and "Retailer of the Year" in 2004 and 2005 by Women's Wear Daily. Before his tenure at Bath and Body Works, Fiske was a partner at Boston Consulting Group.

He graduated from Williams College with a B.A. in political economy and from Harvard Business School with an MBA.
