= List of University of Surrey alumni =

A list of University of Surrey alumni which includes notable graduates and non-graduate former students of the University of Surrey.

== Academics ==
=== Scientists ===
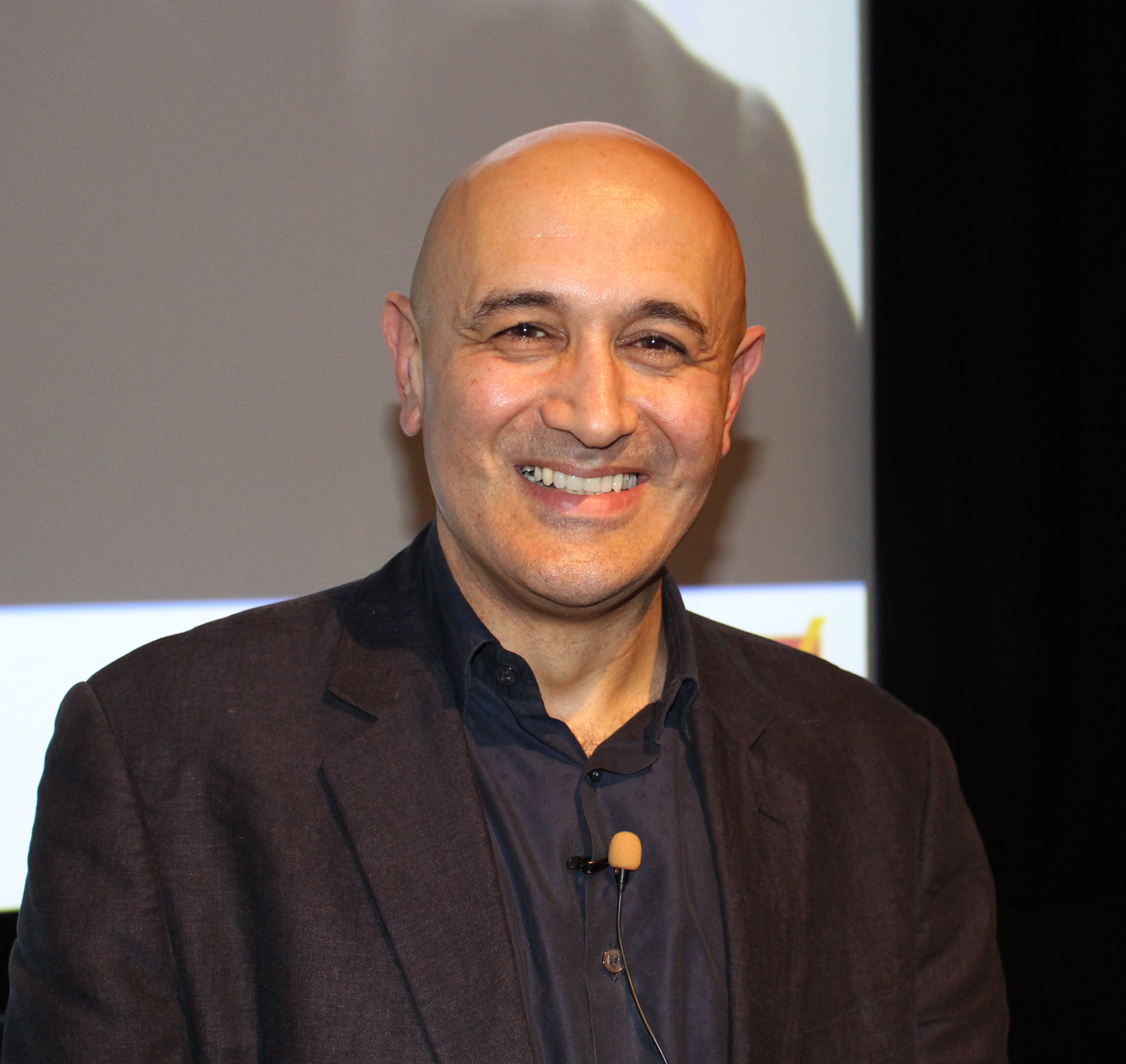
Jim Al-Khalili

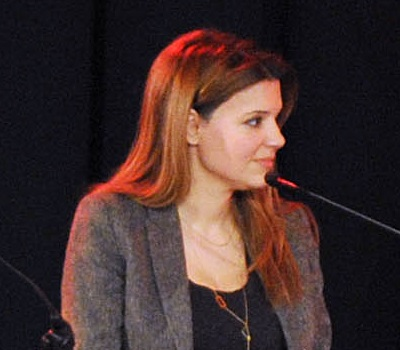
Linda Papadopoulos

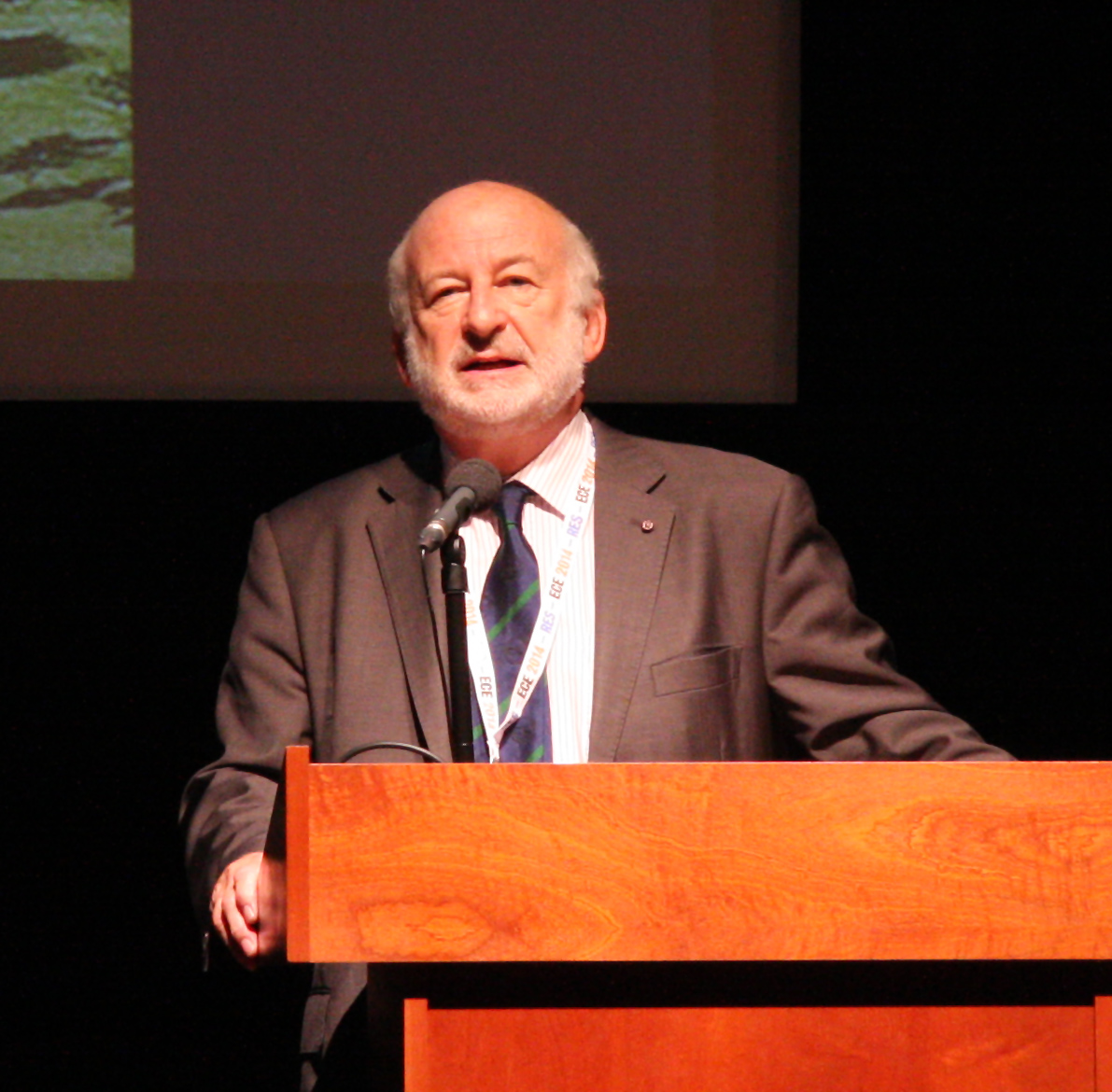
John Pickett

Name	Class year	Notability	Reference(s)
Magda Abu Ras	PhD, 2010	Environmental biotechnologist	
Jim Al-Khalili	BSc, 1986; PhD, 1989	Theoretical physicist	
Sara Arber	PhD, 1991	President of the British Sociological Association	
Tony Attwood	MA	Psychologist	
Judith Baxter	MSc	Sociolinguist	
Ramon Berguer	PhD	Vascular surgeon	
Susan Blackmore	MSc, 1974; PhD, 1980	Parapsychologist	
Tanya Byron	PhD, 1995	Clinical psychologist and Chancellor of Edge Hill University	
Anne Chamney	MSc	Medical engineer	
Martin Earwicker	BSc, 1970	Vice-Chancellor of London South Bank University and Director of the Science Museum Group	
Nicky Fox	MSc, 1991	Head of Science at NASA	
Gísli Guðjónsson	MSc, 1977; PhD, 1981	Forensic psychologist	
Susan Jebb		Nutritionist	
Christopher Jenks	BSc, 1969	Vice-Chancellor of Brunel University	
Kate Jones	PhD, 1998	Zoologist	
John Lennox	MA	Mathematician and Christian philosopher	
Angela Little	BSc, 1971	Educational theorist	
Sue Meek	BSc, 1975	Chief Executive of the Australian Academy of Science	
Wahid Omar	BSc	Vice-Chancellor of Universiti Teknologi Malaysia	
Linda Papadopoulos	MSc	Psychologist	
John Pickett	BSc, 1967; PhD, 1971	Wolf Prize in Agriculture laureate	
Jonathan Potter		Psychologist	
Adam Scaife	MSc, 1992	Meteorologist	
Stefaan Simons	BSc, 1986	Chemical engineer	
Sir Martin Sweeting	BSc, 1974; PhD, 1979	Chairman of Surrey Satellite Technology	
John R. Terry	PhD	Scientist and mathematician	
Sein Tun	MSc, 1967; PhD, 1973	Physicist	
Adrian Walker	MSc	Computer scientist	
Dianne Willcocks	BSc, 1976	Vice-Chancellor of York St John University	

=== Economists ===
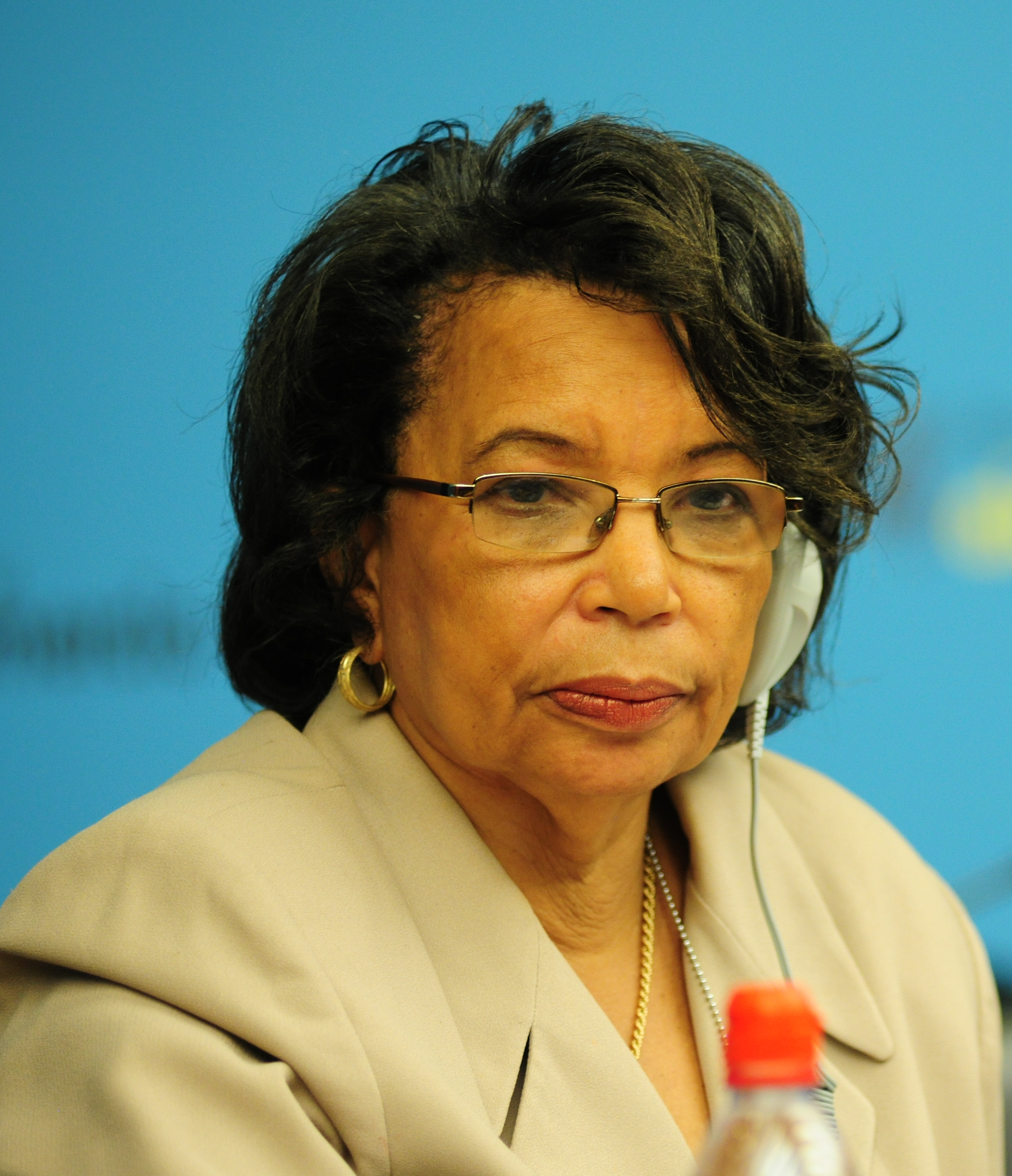
Marion Vernese Williams

Name	Class year	Notability	Reference(s)
Ila Patnaik	PhD, 1996	Economist	
Souad al-Sabah	PhD, 1981	Economist	
Sir David Varney	BSc	Chairman of HM Revenue and Customs	
Marion Vernese Williams	PhD, 1995	Governor of the Central Bank of Barbados	
João Miguel Rodrigues Pereira	BSc, 2022	Advisor to the Secretary of State for the Economy of Portugal	

== Armed forces ==
Name	Class year	Notability	Reference(s)
Major General Nicholas Caplin	BSc	Former General Officer Commanding of British Forces Germany	

== Business people ==
Name	Class year	Notability	Reference(s)
Pejman Azarmina	MSc, 2005	Founder of Thinkocrats	
Victor Chavez	MSc, 1993	CEO of Thales UK	
Robert Earl		Founder and CEO of Planet Hollywood	
David Ebsworth	BSc, 1976; PhD, 1980	Businessman	
Prince Abdul Fattaah of Brunei	BSc, 2002	Chairman of Baiduri Bank	
Keith Harris		Chairman of the Football League	
Kevin Morley	MSc	Businessman	
John Mullen	BSc, 1978	Chairman of Qantas	
Emma Mulqueeny		Founder of Young Rewired State	
Alan Parker	BSc, 1969	Former CEO of Whitbread, and former chairman of Mothercare	
Andrew Rickman	PhD	Internet entrepreneur	

== Engineers ==
Name	Class year	Notability	Reference(s)
Mike Glover		Engineer	
Sir Arthur Hawkins	BSc, 1956	Chairman of the Central Electricity Generating Board	
Abbie Hutty		Space Structures Engineer for ExoMars Mission	
Phebe Mann	MSc, 1995	Chair, Institution of Civil Engineers London; Deputy Chair of Council, Institution of Civil Engineers Inspiring Women of Construction & Engineering Awards - Allyship Champion of the Year; STEM Champion	
Beatrice Shilling	PhD	Aeronautical engineer and motor racer	
Azmi Mohd Hanifah	BEng	Engineer and Deputy Minister of Energy at the Prime Minister's Office	
Anusha Shah	MSc	Civil engineer and 159th President of Institution of Civil Engineers	

== Lawyers ==
Name	Class year	Notability	Reference(s)
Dame Linda Dobbs	BSc, 1976	High Court judge	
Abiola Aderibigbe	LL.B, 2013	British-Nigerian lawyer; advocate for a Nigerian Construction Act	

== Media personnel ==
Name	Class year	Notability	Reference(s)
Behrouz Afagh		BBC executive	
Richard Burrell	BA, 1990	Television producer	
Claudia Hammond	MSc	Journalist	
Aleks Krotoski	PhD, 2009	Technology journalist and broadcaster	
Paul Morgan		Sports journalist	
Róisín Mullins	BA, 2008	Television presenter and dancer	
Sarah Tan		Broadcaster	
Deborah Turness	BA	President of NBC News and Editor of ITV News	
Jonathan Vernon-Smith		Radio presenter	
John Warburton		Television producer and director	
Nigel Williams		Radio presenter	

=== Actors ===
Name	Class year	Notability	Reference(s)
Ella Balinska	BA, 2018	Actor	
Chiké Okonkwo	BSc, 2003	Actor	
Nabil Shaban		Actor	
Rehan Sheikh	BA	Actor	
Wong Li-Lin	MA, 2001	Actress	
Bradley Jaden	BA Musical Theatre, 2008	Actor	

=== Musicians ===
Name	Class year	Notability	Reference(s)
Jim Abbiss	1988	Music producer	
Charlie Andrew	BMus	Music producer	
Lorraine Bowen		Musician	
Bill Bruford	PhD 2016	Drummer	
John Butcher		Saxophonist	
George Chlitsios		Conductor and composer	
Eric Crees		Trombonist	
Huw Edwards		Conductor	
Eleftheria Eleftheriou		Singer	
Stephen Farr	PhD	Organist	
Jeremy Filsell		Musician	
Nick Gatfield		Music executive	
O. D. Hunte		Music producer	
Gerard Johnson	BMus	Keyboardist	
Cass Lowe		Songwriter and producer	
Odaline de la Martinez	MMus, 1977	Composer and conductor	
Kathleen McGuire	MMus	Musician	
Miaoux Miaoux	BMus	Musician	
Michael Price	BMus	Composer	
Starsmith	BMus 2009	Musician	
Sheridan Tongue	BMus	Composer	
Andrew Toovey	BMus	Composer	
Keith Waithe		Musician	
Peter Wilson	BMus	Music producer	

=== Other ===
Name	Class year	Notability	Reference(s)
Litza Bixler	MA, 1995	Choreographer	
Julian Darley	MSc	Filmmaker, founder of the Post Carbon Institute	
Wayne Hemingway	MA	Fashion designer	
Sir Alec Issigonis		Designer of the Mini	
Rita Marcalo	MA, 1998	Dancer and choreographer	
Sheron Wray		Dancer	

== Politicians and civil servants ==
=== UK politicians ===
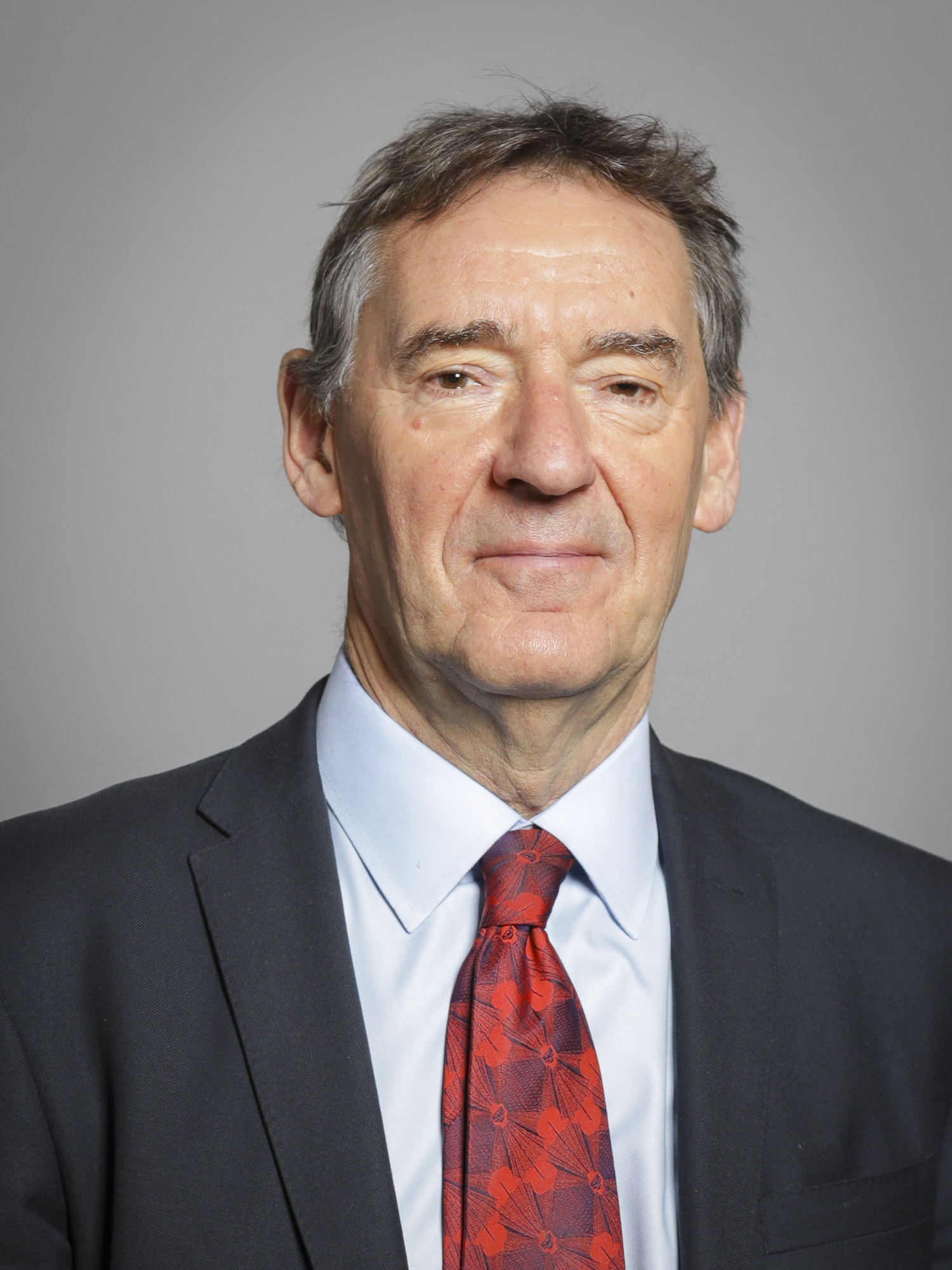
Jim O'Neill, Baron O'Neill of Gatley

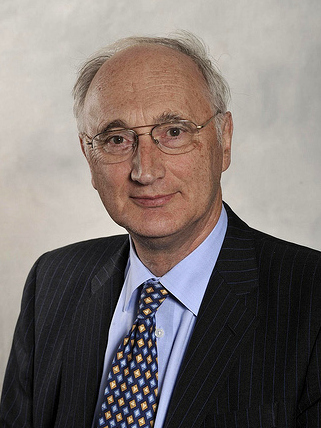
George Young, Baron Young of Cookham

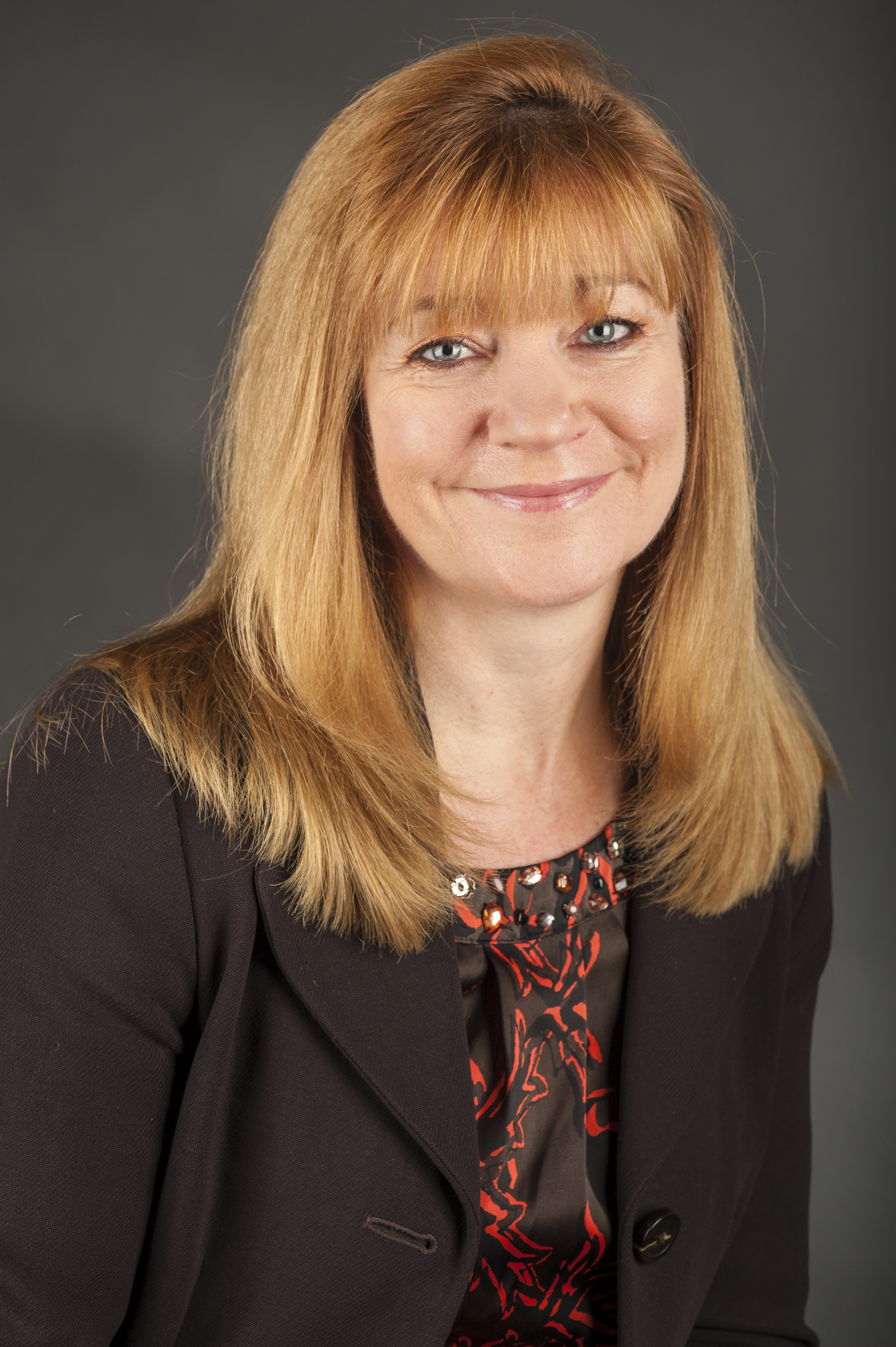
Kay Swinburne, Baroness Swinburne

Name	Class year	Notability	Reference(s)
William Clark, Baron Clark of Kempston	1941	Conservative Member of Parliament and peer	
Ann Keen	PGCE	Labour Member of Parliament	
Liz McInnes	MSc, 1983	Labour Member of Parliament	
Jim O'Neill, Baron O'Neill of Gatley	PhD, 1982	Crossbench peer	
Kay Swinburne, Baroness Swinburne	MBA	Conservative peer	
George Young, Baron Young of Cookham	MPhil, 1974	Conservative peer and former Leader of the House of Commons	

=== Foreign politicians ===
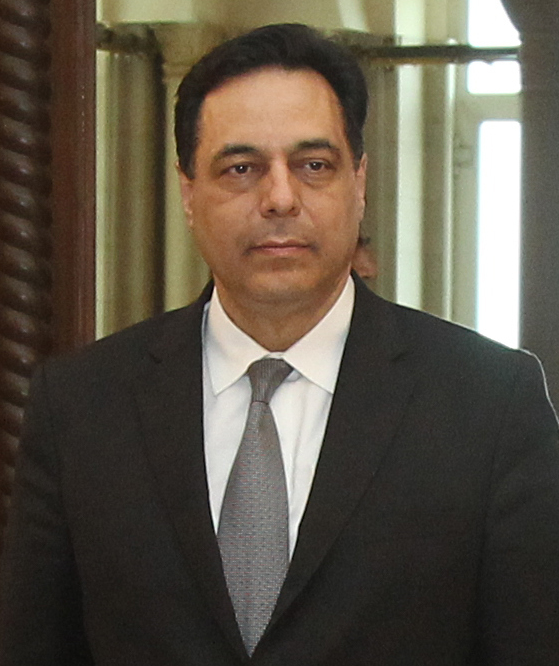
Hassan Diab

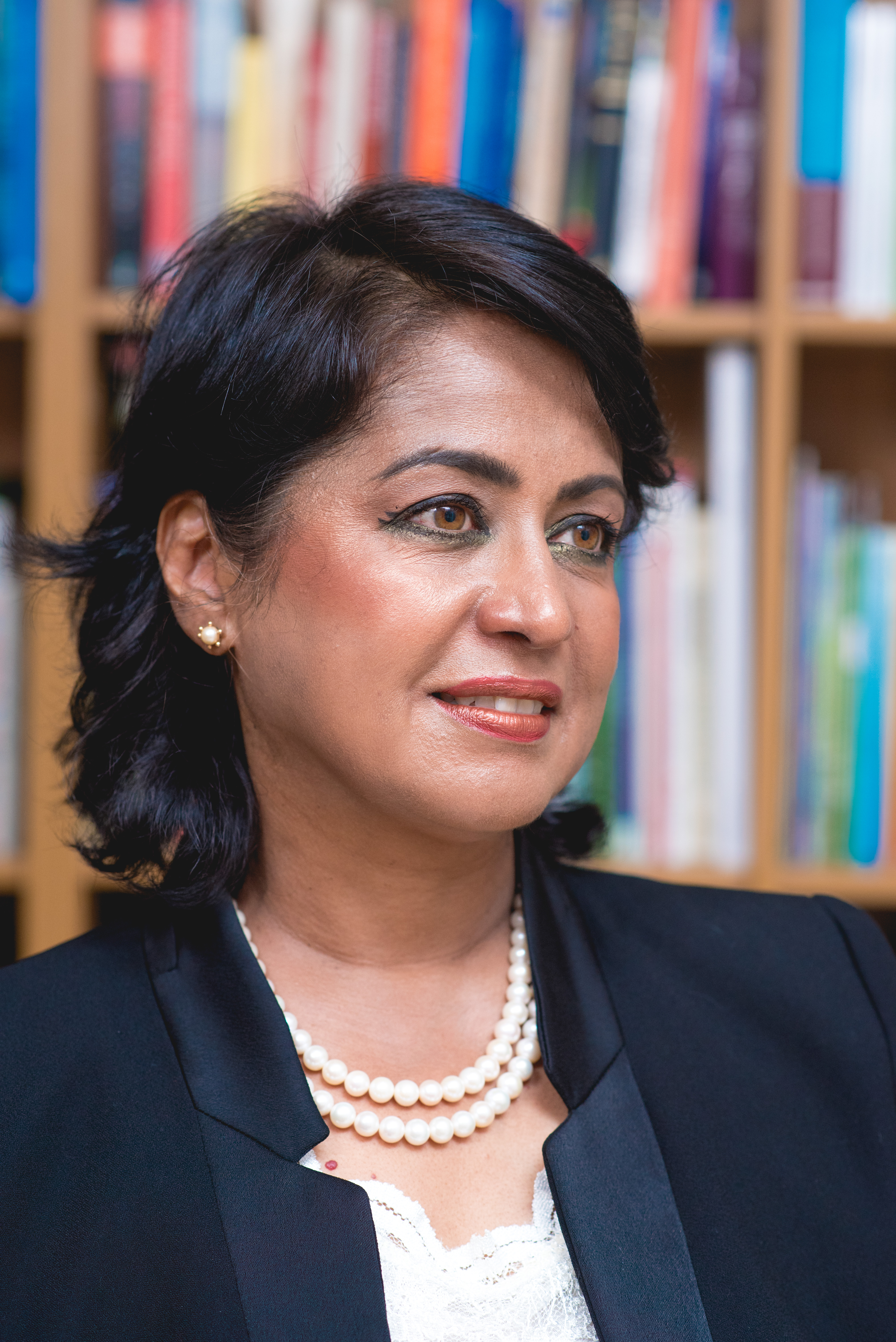
Ameenah Gurib

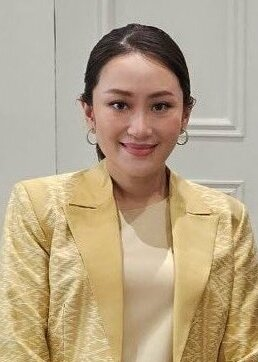
Paetongtarn Shinawatra

Name	Class year	Notability	Reference(s)
Dzulkefly Ahmad		Malaysian Health Minister	
Ghazi Salah al-Din al-Atabani	PhD, 1985	Sudanese Cabinet Minister	
Obafemi Anibaba	PhD, 1975	Nigerian Cabinet Minister	
Rilwan Lanre Babalola	PhD, 1999	Nigerian Cabinet Minister	
Hassan Diab	MSc, 1982	Prime Minister of Lebanon (2020–2021)	
Ameenah Gurib	BSc, 1983	President of Mauritius (2015–2018)	
Khadija Bukar Abba Ibrahim	BSc, 1989	Member of the Nigerian House of Representatives	
Abraham Iyambo	BSc, 1990; PhD, 1994	Namibian Education Minister	
Rihupisa Justus Kandando	PhD, 1998	Namibian politician	
Yiannis Karousos	BSc, 2002	Cypriot Cabinet Minister	
Shukuru Kawambwa	PhD, 1993	Tanzanian Education Minister	
Rolph Payet	MBA	Seychellois Cabinet Minister	
Paetongtarn Shinawatra	MSc	Prime Minister of Thailand (2024–2025)	
Geoff Southern	BSc	Member of the States of Jersey	
Arief Yahya		Indonesian Cabinet Minister	

=== Diplomats ===
Name	Class year	Notability	Reference(s)
Peter Hayes	BSc, 1985	UK High Commissioner to Sri Lanka and Commissioner of the British Indian Ocean Territory and the British Antarctic Territory	
Imad Moustapha	PhD, 1997	Syrian Ambassador to the United States	
Robin Ord-Smith	BSc	UK Ambassador to Tajikistan and UK Ambassador to Kyrgyzstan	
Ramzy Ezzeldin Ramzy	MSc, 1975	Deputy Special Envoy of the Secretary-General of the United Nations for Syria	

== Religion ==
Name	Class year	Notability	Reference(s)
Sarah Bullock	BA, 1986	Bishop of Shrewsbury	
Gordon McPhate	MSc, 1986	Dean of Chester	

== Sports people ==
Name	Class year	Notability	Reference(s)
Kate Allenby	MA	Olympic medal winning pentathlete	
Zak Chelli	BSc	Boxer	
Patrick Collins	BSc	Rugby player	
Armel Tchakounte	MSc; MBA	Footballer	

== Writers ==
Name	Class year	Notability	Reference(s)
Tariq Goddard		Novelist	
Graham Holderness	PhD	Shakespearean scholar	
Suzannah Olivier		Writer	
Alexander Waugh		Writer	
Norsiah Abdul Gapar	BSc, 1978	Writer	

== Other ==
Name	Class year	Notability	Reference(s)
Philip Fang		Interpreter	
Mansur Hoda		Appropriate Technology advocate	
Michael Middleton	BSc, 1973	Businessman; father of Catherine, Princess of Wales	
Muhammad Ruzaini	2003	Bruneian prince consort and civil servant	
