= Rewired =

Rewiring is work done by an electrician.

Rewire, Rewired and variants may also refer to:

== Books ==
- Rewired: The Post-Cyberpunk Anthology, collection of stories 2007
- Rewire: Digital Cosmopolitans in the Age of Connection, nonfiction book about contemporary globalization 2013
- Rewired, poetry collection by Friendly Street Poets 2008

== Music ==
- Rewire Festival, an annual international festival for adventurous music, held in The Netherlands
- Rewired Tour, by Runrig 2012
- Rewired Tour, by The Electric Prunes

=== Albums ===
- Rewired (album), album by Mike + The Mechanics
- Rewired – The Electric Collection, album by Daryl Stuermer
- Rewired, compilation album by Richard Clapton
- Rewired, remix album by Raymond Scott 2014
- Rewired, album by the Tyla Gang 2010
- Rewired, DVD by The Electric Prunes 2003

=== Songs ===
- "Re-Wired" (song), song by Kasabian
- "Rewired", song by The Electric Prunes from California (The Electric Prunes album)
- "Rewired" by Paul Carrack Mike + the Mechanics from Rewired (album)

== Other uses ==
- Rewire (company), Israeli banking and financial services company founded in 2015
- Rewire (website), a website focused on reproductive and sexual health
- ReWire software protocol, jointly developed by Propellerhead and Steinberg, allowing remote control and data transfer among digital audio editing
- Rewired (demoparty)

== See also ==
- Young Rewired State
- Rewired State
- Melt Zonk Rewire album by the New Klezmer Trio
- Plughead Rewired: Circuitry Man II, 1994 American post apocalyptic science fiction film
