= Jatun Risba =

Slovene interdisciplinary artist, researcher, and performer

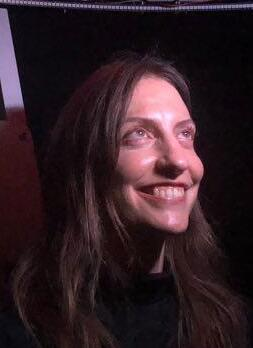
- Born: Slovenia
- Occupations: Interdisciplinary artist, performance artist, researcher, performer
- Years active: 2008–present
- Website: jatunrisba.com

Jatun Risba (they/them) is a Slovene interdisciplinary and intermedia artist, researcher, and performer whose work explores the intersections of art, science, and spirituality. Active since 2008, they are known for developing transdisciplinary projects that engage ecological awareness, queer and posthumanist perspectives, and radical self-healing through art. Risba's practice spans performance art, video art, photography, printmaking, and participatory live art events.

== Early life and education ==
Risba holds a Bachelor of Arts degree from the Nuova Accademia di Belle Arti (NABA) in Milan, Italy, and a postgraduate certificate in Art & Science from Central Saint Martins, University of the Arts London.

== Artistic practice ==
Risba's work engages with eco-feminist and post-humanist discourses through performance, conceptual, and relational art. Their practice-as-research examines themes including body politics, menstruation, gender equity, multispecies kinship, ecological interdependence, and radical self-healing.

In 2025, Risba published the article "Menstrual Cups: R—Evolutionary Devices for Overcoming Wrong Views About Life" in Body, Space & Technology, exploring the creative potential of menstrual cups in challenging social taboos.

During the COVID-19 pandemic, Risba co-founded Be-coming Tree, a global live-art project connecting artists performing simultaneously with trees across six continents. The project was featured in the "Queering Nature" issue of Antennae: The Journal of Nature in Visual Culture.

== Exhibitions and performances ==
Risba has exhibited and performed internationally, including:

- Meta.Morf 2022 Trondheim Biennale (Norway) – participation in Ecophilia with the project Be-coming Tree.
- Schmiede Hallein Festival (Austria) – collaborative installation The Energy of Menstruation: The Bleeding Cucumber (2023–2024) and participation in the Schmiede Akademie AiR program.
- Subnet Artist Residency, Salzburg AiR / Subnet 2024 – interdisciplinary art-and-science residency.
- Instant Dissidence Residency with Rita Marcalo, Cloughjordan Ecovillage, Ireland (2024) – collaborative site-specific performance.
- Fabbrica del Vapore, Milan – exhibition Stand For Girls including Not an Adolescent Girl.
- Pixxelpoint Festival (2008, 2019) – participation with digital and new-media artworks.
- SKRB: When Rivers Weep, Y Gallery, Ljubljana, Slovenia – group exhibition.
- A Tree Doesn’t Fall Far From the Mountain (with Franco G. Livera), Gigi Rigliaco Gallery, Galatina, Italy – photography exhibition.
- Biohazard Bandolier: In-between Panic at Pixxelpoint Festival, Nova Gorica (15.11.2025) – performative lecture.

== Selected works ==
- Mpasturavacche. The Milk-Suckling Snake (2019) – a one-to-one interactive art-and-science performance exploring the umwelt of reptiles and human/non-human relationality.
- Laughing at Life Matters (2019) – a one-on-one performative installation exploring the physical, olfactory, and chemical properties of six essential life elements, presented in the exhibition Mirrored Anatomies at University College London.
- Possibility of a Relation (2023) – a performance tracing an alchemic matrix to explore collective conviviality.
- The Intimacy of Otherness (2023-) – a durational transmedia performance-lecture reflecting Risba's radical self-healing from multiple sclerosis.

== Workshops, artist talks and lectures ==
- Fakulta Výtvarných Umení AU, Banská Bystrica, Slovakia (2025) – workshop & artist talk.
- University of the Underground – artist talk on intermedia performance and ecology.
- Additional talks and workshops at Goethe University Frankfurt, University of Strasbourg, Academy of Art and Design in Wrocław, and Live Art Ireland.

== Affiliations ==
Risba is the founder and co-facilitator of the global live-art project Be-coming Tree.
