= David Marcus =

David Marcus may refer to:

- Mickey Marcus (David Daniel Marcus, 1901–1948), American-Israeli soldier
- David Marcus (writer) (1924–2009), Irish Jewish editor and writer
- David A. Marcus (born 1973), American entrepreneur, co-creator of Facebook's Diem
- David Marcus (equestrian) (born 1980), Canadian Olympic dressage rider
- David Marcus (Star Trek), a character in Star Trek

== See also ==
- David Markus (born 1973), American government attorney
