= Ethan Zuckerman =

American media scholar, blogger, & Internet activist (born 1973)

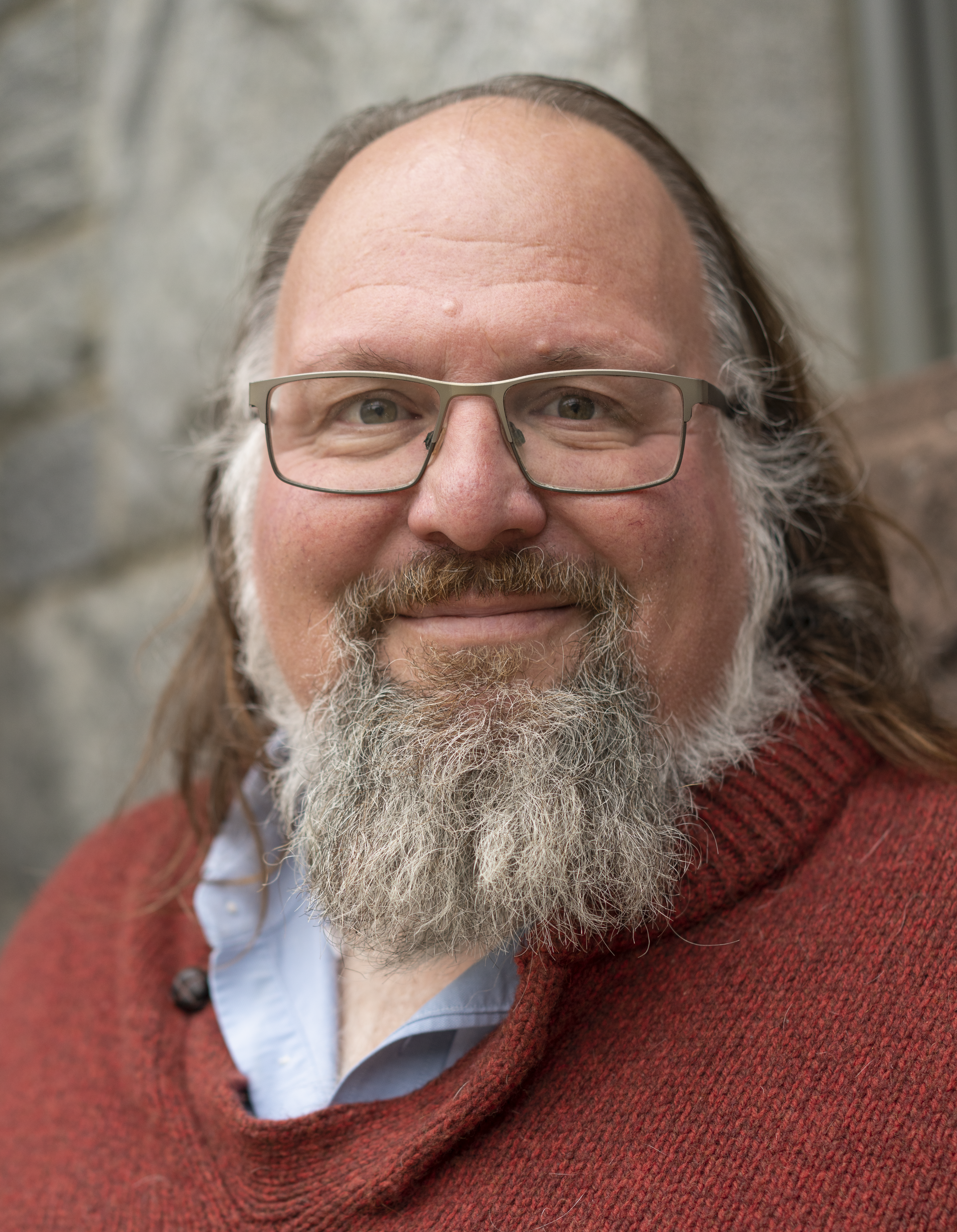
- Zuckerman in 2021
- Born: January 4, 1973 (age 53)
- Education: Williams College (BA)
- Occupation: Media scholar
- Scientific career
- Notable students: Joy Buolamwini
- Website: ethanzuckerman.com

Ethan Zuckerman (born January 4, 1973) is an American media scholar, blogger, and Internet activist. He was the director of the MIT Center for Civic Media, and Associate Professor of the Practice in Media Arts and Sciences at MIT until May 2020, and the author of the 2013 book Rewire: Digital Cosmopolitans in the Age of Connection, which won the Zócalo Book Prize. In 2020, he became an associate professor of public policy, communication and information at the University of Massachusetts.

== Education ==
Zuckerman is a graduate of Williams College, where he received a B.A. in Philosophy in 1993. He then spent a year on a Fulbright scholarship at the University of Legon, Ghana and the National Theatre of Ghana in Accra, where he studied ethnomusicology and percussion.

== Career ==
Zuckerman was one of the first staff members of Tripod.com, one of the first successful "dot com" enterprises, where he worked from 1994 to 1999. There, he was in charge of the design and the implementation of the website, which at that time marketed content and services to recent college graduates. The business model of this website was exclusively based on advertising. After one of the website's major advertisers complained that one of their banner advertisements had appeared on a page that celebrated anal sex, Zuckerman imagined a way to associate an ad with a user's page without putting it directly on the page. His solution was to open a new dedicated window with only the ad in it. While Zuckerman claims having only written the code to open a new window, he is credited as the inventor of the pop-up ad.

In 2000, he founded Geekcorps and 2004, Global Voices where he sits on its board.

He won the MIT Technology Review "Technology in the Service of Humanity" award in 2002 for his work on Geekcorps. Zuckerman has been a senior researcher at the Berkman Center for Internet and Society, where he is also a long-time fellow. His work at the Berkman Center has included research into global media attention, as well as the co-founding of Global Voices in collaboration with Rebecca MacKinnon. For some years he was also a contributing writer for Worldchanging.com, where he served as president of the board of directors.

In April 2006, after the detention of Global Voices blogger Hao Wu by Chinese authorities, Zuckerman and MacKinnon ran a blog dedicated to platforming Wu's sister in her campaign for his release.

In January 2007, he joined the inaugural Wikimedia Foundation Advisory Board.

In 2008, he coined the cute cat theory of digital activism.

In 2011, he was named by Foreign Policy magazine to its list of top global thinkers, in which he stated the Best idea is "The world isn't flat and globalization is only beginning, which means we have time to change what we're doing and get it right". Also in September of that year, he became the director of the MIT Center for Civic Media.

Zuckerman was an Open Society Global Board member, and also sits on the board of directors of Ushahidi, Global Voices, and the Ghanaian journalism training nonprofit, PenPlusBytes.

He was interviewed in the 2015 web documentary about internet privacy, Do Not Track.

On July 1, 2016, Zuckerman was appointed Associate Professor of the Practice in Media Arts and Sciences at MIT.

In 2019, revelations of Media Lab director Joi Ito's connections with Jeffrey Epstein, a convicted sex offender, shed light on the extent of monetary gifts from Epstein to the Media Lab and Ito's startups outside of MIT. Zuckerman resigned from his position as director of the MIT Center for Civic Media, in protest of the Media Lab's involvement with Epstein. He joined the faculty of the University of Massachusetts at Amherst in April 2020.

In 2024, Zuckerman, in his academic role, brought a suit, represented by lawyers from Knight First Amendment Institute, for declaratory relief under section 230 of the US Communications Decency Act. He proposed to use a piece of software similar to Unfollow Everything to evaluate user response to having control of their social media feeds. The motion was dismissed without prejudice in November 2024, due to the tool not yet existing, and federal law prohibiting federal courts from issuing advisory opinions.

== Personal life ==
Zuckerman resides in Lanesborough, Massachusetts, and has a son with Rachel Barenblat. On October 7, 2022, Zuckerman married Amy Price.

== Works by Zuckerman ==
- "Using the Internet to Examine Patterns of Foreign Coverage." Neiman Reports, Fall 2004.
- Hal Roberts, Ethan Zuckerman, and John Palfrey. 2007 Circumvention Landscape Report: Methods, Uses, and Tools. Berkman Center for Internet & Society at Harvard University, 2009-03
- "Innovating From Constraint in the Developing World." Harvard Business Review, 2009-01-23
- "Web 2.0 tools for development: simple tools for smart people." Participatory Learning and Action, Volume 59, Number 1, Change at hand: Web 2.0 for development, 2009–06, IIED and CTA.
- "Citizen Media and the Kenyan Electoral Crisis." In: Stuart Allan. Citizen journalism: global perspectives. Peter Lang, 2009
- "Decentralizing the Mobile Phone:A Second ICT4D Revolution? " Information Technologies & International Development, Volume 6, SE, Special Edition 2010
- "International reporting in the age of participatory media." Daedalus, Spring 2010, Vol. 139, No. 2.
- "Internet Freedom: Beyond Circumvention." In: The next digital decade : essays on the future of the internet. Washington D.C. : TechFreedom, 2010.
- "The First Twitter Revolution? " Foreign Policy, 2011-01-14
- Hal Roberts, Ethan Zuckerman and John Palfrey. 2011 Circumvention Tool Evaluation. Berkman Center, 2011
- Rewire: Digital Cosmopolitans in the Age of Connection. New York: W. W. Norton & Company. June 17, 2013. ISBN 978-0-393-08283-8.
- "Building a More Honest Internet" Columbia Journalism Review, Fall 2019.

== See also ==
- Media Cloud, co-developed by Zuckerman
