= Rugby World =

Rugby union magazine

- Cover of the October 2024 issue
- Editor: Joe Robinson
- Categories: Sport, Rugby union
- Circulation: 26,964 average monthly circulation for 2022
- First issue: October 1960
- Company: Longacre Press (1960–1961); Fleetway Publications (1961–1963); IPC Media/TI Media (1963–2020); Future plc (2020–present)
- Country: United Kingdom
- Based in: London
- Language: English
- Website: www.rugbyworld.com

Rugby World is a monthly rugby union magazine running since October 1960. It is published monthly by Future plc and edited by Joe Robinson. Long-standing editor Paul Morgan left in January 2012. Morgan was long considered a leader in the industry, the magazine is the world's top-selling rugby magazine and has benefited from a worldwide rise in interest in rugby following the 2003 Rugby Union World Cup.

The magazine was initially published on "the third Wednesday of every month" by Longacre Press Limited (part of Odhams Press) which, in 1961, merged with Fleetway Publications and again in 1963 Fleetway merged with a number of other publishers to form IPC Media, though Odhams remained a distinct sub-company until 1968). The magazine was available through INI Sales and Distribution, 161-166 Fleet Street, London E.C.4. The original cost of the magazine was 2 Shillings (equivalent to £2.91 today). By the end of 1962 it was retailing at 2 Shillings 6 pence (written "2/6d", £3.64 today) and currently retails for £4.30 per issue, though various other deals are available by buying subscriptions and / or the electronic version of the magazine.

Today, Rugby World is published by Future plc with Joe Robinson as current editor.

== See also ==
- Bill McLaren
- Norman Mair
- Ian Robertson (rugby commentator)
- Nigel Starmer-Smith
- Alison Kervin OBE
