= Adrian Walker =

Adrian Walker may refer to:

- Adrian Walker (journalist)
- Adrian Walker (computer scientist)
