= Paul Morgan (journalist) =

Paul Morgan owns his own Media, Communications and Social Media Consultancy after more than a decade as the Communications Director at Premiership Rugby, the organisation which manages the top league in English club rugby – Gallagher Premiership Rugby. Paul has featured in the PR Week Power Book Top 10 of Sports PRs on two consecutive years, in 2021 and 2022. He moved into communications, at Premiership Rugby, in 2012 after more than 20 years as a sports and news journalist and editor, and become responsible for both the organisation's external and internal communications, their content and social media channels. He was editor of Rugby World magazine and the IRB World Rugby Yearbook. He ghost-wrote Year of the Tiger!: My 2004/05 Season Diary by Lewis Moody and in 2011 Splashdown which covers an incredible year in the life of England Test star Chris Ashton.

== Biography ==
After a degree in politics from the University of Surrey he got his first break in journalism at the Richmond and Twickenham Times, under the editorship of Malcolm Richards. In addition to his work as Editor of Rugby World he has written almost a dozen books on rugby union including The History of Rugby and was editor of the IRB World Rugby Yearbook for five years. In 2010 he was elected as chairman of the British Rugby Writers Club.

He went to the famous Reg Hayter (sports reporting) Agency when it was still in Fleet Street at the same as other sports journalists including Rob Draper (Mail on Sunday), Brendan Gallagher (Daily Telegraph), John Stern (editor of the Wisden Cricketer Magazine), Steve Davies (Racing Post) and Joe Bernstein (Mail on Sunday). While at Hayters he began working for Rugby World and was employed full-time as deputy editor, by editor Alison Kervin. When Kervin became a publisher at IPC Media, Morgan succeeded her as editor. He is also editor of www.rugbyworld.com, a website he launched with Kervin. Morgan also managed Rugby World's social media programme.

A former chair of the Rugby Union Writers' Club, he was also chair of the Editors' Group at IPC Media and a winner of one of their Editorial Awards. A freelance rugby union writer for the Mail on Sunday he was a regular contributor to BBC Radio 5 Live, BBC Radio Wales, CNN and has appeared on a number of television programmes including Sky News, Rugby Special, BBC Breakfast and 110%.
