= Rewire (company) =

Israeli banking and financial services company

Rewire by Remitly
- Type: Subsidiary
- Industry: Financial technology
- Founded: 2015; 11 years ago
- Founders: Guy Kashtan; Saar Yahalom; Adi Ben Dayan; Or Benoz
- Headquarters: Tel Aviv, Israel
- Area served: Worldwide
- Key people: Guy Kashtan (CEO); Adi Ben Dayan (VP Engineering)
- Products: Digital Financial Platform
- Services: Remittance, money transfer, financial management
- Parent: Remitly
- Website: www.rewire.co.il

Rewire by Remitly is a digital financial platform operated by the fintech company Remitly in Israel that provides online financial services tailored to migrant workers. The platform provides remittance services for workers to transfer funds back home. The Rewire by Remitly platform was originally built by the Israeli startup Rewire which was founded by Guy Kashtan, Saar Yahalom, Adi Ben Dayan, and Or Benoz.

In August 2022 an acquisition agreement was signed between Rewire and leading remittance company Remitly. In January 2023, the deal closed and Rewire officially became part of Remitly, an American fintech company traded on Nasdaq. After the acquisition, the company in Israel was rebranded as Remitly Israel and the financial platform was rebranded as Rewire by Remitly.

== History ==
Remitly Israel originated as the startup company Rewire, which was founded in 2015 by Guy Kashtan, Saar Yahalom, Adi Ben Dayan, and Or Benoz. The company was established in Israel to provide financial services to the country’s foreign worker population.

Its initial customers included Filipino migrant workers employed in Israel as domestic caregivers for the elderly. Rewire later expanded its services to additional migrant communities sending remittances to countries including India, Thailand, and China. Early investors included Israeli-based firms such as Our Crowd, Viola Fintech, and Moneta VC, as well as BNP Paribas (Opera Tech) and Standard Bank of South Africa.

In 2021, Rewire announced the completion of a $20 million Series B funding round and a collaboration with Israel’s Bank Hapoalim. Participants in the funding round included Renegade Partners, Glilot Capital Partners, and Jerry Yang, former Yahoo! CEO and a director at Alibaba, through AME Cloud Ventures. During the same period, the company announced that it had obtained an EU Electronic Money Institution (EMI) license from the Dutch Central Bank, permitting it to issue electronic money, provide payment services, and conduct money remittance activities. Rewire was also granted an expanded Israeli Financial Asset Service Provider designation.

In 2022, Rewire announced a series of corporate transactions, including a $25 million strategic investment round in February, the acquisition of the Israeli prepaid card company Imagen in June, and an agreement in August to be acquired by the American online remittance company Remitly, which is traded on Nasdaq.

The acquisition, valued at $80, was finalized in January 2023. Following the acquisition, Rewire was rebranded as Remitly Israel, and its platform was renamed Rewire by Remitly.

== Platform ==
The Rewire by Remitly platform is offered in twelve different languages. The online financial platform enables immigrants in Israel to send money to their countries of origin. Customers in Israel can issue a salary card (Rewire Card) that is connected to a Bank of Jerusalem account and their Rewire by Remitly account. Employers of immigrants can deposit salaries directly into the salary card.
