= Moses Mescheloff =

Rabbi Moses Mescheloff
- משה משלוף

Rabbi of Beth Jacob Congregation, Miami Beach
- In office 1937–1954

Rabbi of Congregation K.I.N.S. of West Rogers Park
- In office 1954–1982

Personal details
- Born: June 12, 1909 New York City, New York, U.S.
- Died: May 9, 2008 (aged 98) Chicago, Illinois, U.S.
- Education: Rabbi Isaac Elchanan Theological Seminary, City College of New York
- Occupation: Rabbi

Moses (Moshe) Mescheloff (Hebrew: משה בן מאיר משלוף; June 12, 1909 – May 9, 2008) was an American rabbi, primarily in Miami Beach, and in Chicago.

== Biography ==
Mescheloff, the third of four children, was born in New York City in 1909.

His parents, Meier Mischelow (Hebrew: מאיר בן יוסף ישראל and Bessie (Basse Mirel) Kroll, (Hebrew: בתיה מרים בת אליעזר זאב, immigrated to the United States from Minsk in 1906.

Mescheloff began high school in 1922 at Yeshiva University High School for Boys as its first native English speaker, where in 1932 he received semikhah (ordination).

He was also a night student at City College of New York (CCNY) write he received a B.A. degree in 1932.

His first rabbinical position was at Congregation Machzike Hadas, in Scranton, Pennsylvania, from 1932 to 1936. In 1935, Mescheloff married Magda (Hebrew: מרים), Schönfeld. The couple had three children.

Mescheloff was the rabbi of Congregation House of Israel, North Adams, Massachusetts in 1936 and 1937.

=== Miami Beach ===
In 1937 he became the rabbi of Beth Jacob Congregation ("the Third Street shul") in Miami Beach, Florida. There were restrictive covenants in the land deeds of one of South Florida's biggest real estate developers in the 1920s preventing Jews from living north of Miami Beach's Fifth Street until the 1940s, when such limitations became unenforceable and, later, were recognized as illegal.

Mescheloff designed the synagogue's nearly 80 stained-glass windows, one of which was dedicated to the donor, the organized crime figure Meyer Lansky. Mescheloff designed the bimah - the central platform for the public Torah reading - by carving a model out of a block of soap for the architect.

He was the organizer and the Rav Hamachshir - the rabbi who certified the kashrut of food products and institutions - of the Vaad Hakashruth of Miami Beach. He served as President of the Dade County Rabbinical Association, Vice President of the Rabbinical Council of America, Vice President of the Florida Rabbinical Association, Chairman of the Jewish National Fund of South Florida, President of Greater Miami Mizrachi, Chairman of the Greater Miami Zionist Youth Commission, and Vice President of the Miami Beach Zionist District (ZOA).

Mescheloff led in the building of the first mikvah in Miami Beach, built during World War II when, due to limited supplies of cement, a special permit for building concrete structures had to be obtained for the mikvah.

Mescheloff served as Secretary of the Association of Miami Beach Interfaith Clergy. He was featured on the radio for three years in South Florida as a member of a panel of "Men of Good Will".

When Miami Beach was taken over by the military during World War II for the training of new recruits, Rabbi Mescheloff became a civilian chaplain.

He was a member of the delegation who tried to save the refugees on the ship SS St. Louis. Denied entry into Havana, Cuba, the ship sought sanctuary in the United States by docking in Miami. The delegation of some of the most prominent rabbis of the U.S. could not convince officials in Miami or Washington DC, that this was a question of life or death. The ship returned to Germany and the fate of the refugees was sealed; very few survived the European Holocaust.

Mescheloff also headed the Miami Beach Beth Din (Jewish ecclesiastical court) that presided over the writing of Jewish bills of divorce.

=== Chicago ===
In 1954, Mescheloff moved to Chicago to a congregation in West Rogers Park, Chicago, Congregation K.I.N.S. (Knesset Israel Nusach Sfard) of West Rogers Park.

In Chicago he served as president of the Chicago Rabbinical Council (CRC), president of the Chicago Religious Zionist Council and president of the Chicago Board of Rabbis. He was Chairman of the CRC's Publication Committee. Together with Rabbi Schachnowitz, he was co-chairman of the Joint Vaad Hakashruth of the CRC and the Mercaz Harabbonim. He was a member of Chicago's Jewish Community Relations Council and the Council for Jewish Elderly.

Mescheloff sometimes opened Chicago City Council meetings with an invocation, including on May 13, 1981, when the mayor received word that Pope John Paul II had been shot. Mescheloff, still in the Council chambers, was called upon to offer prayers for his recovery. His non-sectarian prayer was then re-broadcast throughout that day.

He served as an officer or a member of the Board of the Mayor's Advisory Council on Human Relations, the Chicago Commission on Race and Religion, the North Town Community Council, the North Town Inter-faith Fellowship, the Chicago Inter-religious Council for the Homeless, the Mayor's Advisory Council for the Department on Aging, and the North Town/Rogers Park Division for Chicago's Mental Health Association.

Mescheloff was elected by the Hall of Fame Selection Committee and inducted by Mayor Richard M. Daley into Chicago's Senior Hall of Fame in 1989. In 2002 the city put a street sign in front of the entrance to Congregation K.I.N.S. saying "Honorary Rabbi Moses Mescheloff Street".

Mescheloff was a member of the Rabbinical Council of America (RCA) for seventy-five years, from 1935 until his death.

In 1980 Mescheloff received a doctorate in Hebrew Literature from the graduate school of the Hebrew Theological College of Skokie, Illinois.

After ten years, the congregation signed a life contract with Mescheloff. From 1982 he served as Rabbi Emeritus.

Mescheloff died in Chicago 4 Iyyar 5768 (May 9, 2008).

== Bibliography ==
- Hundreds of sermons, in each volume of the Rabbinical Council of America Sermon Manual, Vol. 1 - 44, Rabbinical Council Press, New York, 1943 - 1986.
- Hundreds of editorials, bi-monthly, in the Chicago Sentinel (Anglo-Jewish weekly), as member of the editorial staff for ten years.
- Hundreds of Torah thoughts and reviews in the regular bulletins of his synagogues, over the course of several decades.
- "Father's Place", in Abraham B. Shoulson, ed., Marriage and Family life, A Jewish View, New York: Twayne Publishers, 1959.
- The covenant of Abraham: the rite of circumcision, Chicago: Chicago Rabbinical Council, [1980], OCLC: 7108513.
- The parting of ways: fundamentals of Jewish divorce, Chicago: Chicago Rabbinical Council, [1980], OCLC: 7135122.
- The Ban as a Legal Instrument and a Social Institution from Scriptural Times through the pre-Mishnaic, Mishnaic, Talmudic, Gaonic and Middle Ages to Modern Times, Chicago: Ph.D. Dissertation, M. Mescheloff, 1980, OCLC: 28911912.
- In the priest's office: functions of the Cohen, Chicago: Chicago Rabbinical Council, [1980], OCLC: 7135138.
- Right before the King (Esther VIII, 5): fundamentals of Kashruth, Chicago: Chicago Rabbinical Council, [1980], OCLC: 7135198.
- Procedure in obtaining a religious Jewish divorce. Prepared for members of the legal profession by Moses Mescheloff, President, Chicago Rabbinical Council. Chicago: OCLC: 78018387.
- Hebrew: פסק דין בענין מוחלת כתובתה, כתב יד מהרב משה גואקיל, הדרום כרך נ"ד, סיון תשמ"ה
- Hebrew: שתי תשובות - תקנות מחכמי פס בענין סבלונות, אורייתא, כרך ט"ו, בעריכת הרב עמיהוד יצחק מאיר לוין, נתניה, ניסן תשמ"ו, עמ' מד-מז.
- Hebrew: תקנה עתיקה בעניין ההשגחה על סופרי סת"ם, מתוך כתב-יד, הדרום כרך נ"ה, אלול תשמ"ו
