= Rachel Barenblat =

American poet

- Rachel Barenblat wearing tefillin, 2007

Personal life
- Born: 1975 (age 50–51) San Antonio, Texas, U.S.

Religious life
- Religion: Jewish

Rachel Barenblat (born 1975) is an American poet and rabbi. She was ordained as a rabbi in 2011. In 2015, she was named co-chair of ALEPH: Alliance for Jewish Renewal along with Rabbi David Markus. In 2016, The Forward named her one of America's most inspiring rabbis.

== Background ==
Rachel Barenblat was born in San Antonio, Texas in 1975 to Marvin and Liana Barenblat. She moved to New England in 1992 to attend Williams College in Williamstown, Massachusetts. She holds a BA in religion from Williams and a Masters of Fine Arts in writing and literature from the Bennington Writing Seminars, as well as rabbinic ordination from ALEPH: the Alliance for Jewish Renewal and a secondary ordination as a mashpi'ah, also from ALEPH.

== Work ==
=== Jewish Renewal involvement ===
From 2005 to 2010, Barenblat was a student in the ALEPH rabbinic program; she was ordained a rabbi in early 2011.

Beginning in 2014 she served on the board of directors of ALEPH: Alliance for Jewish Renewal, which she co-chaired from 2015 to 2017. In 2018 she co-founded Bayit: Building Jewish.

=== Arts and publishing ===
In 2000 Barenblat co-founded Inkberry, a literary arts non-profit organization, with Sandy Ryan and Emily Banner. From 1999 to 2002 she was a contributing editor at Pif Magazine and for several years in the early 2000s served as contributing editor at Zeek magazine, a Jewish journal of thought and culture. Her book Massachusetts: The Bay State was published in 2002 by World Almanac Library, along with books about Wisconsin, Michigan, Washington and Texas. From 2009 to 2011, she served on the board of directors of the Organization for Transformative Works.

==== Poetry ====
Barenblat is author of several book-length collections of poetry, including 70 faces: Torah poems (Phoenicia Publishing, 2011), Waiting to Unfold (Phoenicia, 2013), and Texts to the Holy (Ben Yehuda Press, 2018), as well as a variety of liturgical works, most notably her haggadah for Pesach and a volume for mourners called Beside Still Waters co-published by Ben Yehuda Press and Bayit: Building Jewish in 2019.

Her first full-length collection of poems, 70 Faces—a collection of poems which arise out of a full year's cycle of weekly Torah portions—was published by Montreal-based Phoenicia Publishing in 2011.

Her second book of poetry, Waiting to Unfold, was also published by Phoenicia (2013). Barenblat wrote the poems in the collection in the year after her son's birth, following her first year of motherhood.

Barenblat is also author of several poetry chapbooks, among them the skies here (Pecan Grove Press, 1995), What Stays (Bennington Writing Seminars Alumni Chapbook Series, 2002), chaplainbook (Laupe House Press, 2006), and the self-published Through, a collection of miscarriage poems (2009.)

==== Blogging ====
She started a blog, Velveteen Rabbi, in 2003, and in the spring of 2008, it was named one of the top 25 blogs in Time.com's First Annual Blog Index. She has guest-blogged at Jewess, Kesher Talk, Sojourner, and the Best American Poetry Blog, and she spent a year writing weekly Torah commentaries for Radical Torah. Her poetry appears in The Heart of All That Is: Reflections on Home (Holy Cow! Press, 2013), Before There Is Nowhere to Stand (Lost Horse Press, 2012), and The Bloomsbury Anthology of Contemporary Jewish American Poetry (Bloomsbury, 2013), among others.

With Thurman Hart, Barenblat co-founded the first Progressive Faith Blog Con, a gathering for bloggers of progressive faith which took place in Montclair, New Jersey in 2006.

Her Velveteen Rabbi's Haggadah for Pesach, a free and open-source haggadah which combines traditional texts with poetry and creative interpretations, is used worldwide.

== Personal life ==
Barenblat lives in Williamstown, Massachusetts. She married Ethan Zuckerman in 1998, and they have one son. They divorced in 2016. Since 2011, she has served as the rabbi for Congregation Beth Israel in North Adams, MA. She has also served as interim Jewish chaplain to Williams College.
