= Congregation Beth Israel (North Adams, Massachusetts) =

Reform synagogue in North Adams, Massachusetts, US

- Hebrew: חבורת בית ישראל
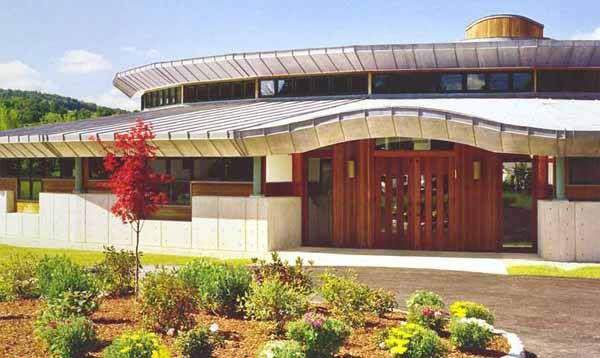

- Location in Massachusetts

Religion
- Affiliation: Reform Judaism
- Ecclesiastical or organizational status: Synagogue
- Leadership: Rabbi Rachel Barenblat
- Status: Active

Location
- Location: 53 Lois Street, North Adams, Massachusetts
- Country: United States
- Interactive map of Congregation Beth Israel
- Coordinates: 42°41′55″N 73°10′05″W

Architecture
- Architect: The Office of Michael Rosenfeld
- Type: Synagogue
- Established: c. 1890s (as a congregation)
- Completed: 1894 (Francis Street); 1909 (Ashland Street, Chevre Chai Odom); 1922 (Center Street); 1961 (Church Street); 2003 (Lois Street)

Specifications
- Capacity: 230 worshippers
- Interior area: 6,000 square feet (560 m^{2})
- Dome: One
- Materials: Concrete, timber

Website
- cbiweb.org

Congregation Beth Israel (Hebrew: חבורת בית ישראל, lit. 'House of Israel') is a Reform Jewish congregation and synagogue located at 53 Lois Street, in North Adams, Massachusetts, in the United States. The congregation was founded in the early 1890s as House of Israel by Eastern European Jews recently immigrated to the United States. The Chevre Chai Odom congregation broke away from House of Israel in 1905, but re-united with it in 1958, and the congregation adopted its current name in 1961.

Originally Orthodox, it became Conservative in 1969 and Reform in 2000. The congregation has had five synagogue buildings since its founding, and moved to its present location in 2003.

Beth Israel's first rabbis were Irving Miller (1925) and Moses Mescheloff (1936–1937). Rabbis in the 1950s and 1960s included Abraham Halbfinger and Earl Fishhaut. Jeffrey Wolfson Goldwasser joined the congregation as rabbi in 2000. Rachel Barenblat succeeded him in 2011.

== Early years ==
Beth Israel was founded as the House of Israel in North Adams, Massachusetts, in the early 1890s. Jewish immigrants first arrived in the North Adams area in 1867, and by 1890 comprised twenty-five families in North Adams and five more in Adams. They met to hold High Holy Days services as early as 1888, and in subsequent years held regular services in their homes and rented halls for the High Holy Days. The Jewish origins of the founders were fairly homogeneous; most came from the Minsk Province of Belarus, and of those, most came from the town of Kletsk. Because the North Adams region had few of the more assimilated Sephardi Jews or German Jews of earlier migrations to the United States, there was little conflict over maintaining traditional Orthodox services.

The congregation purchased a plot of land on Francis Street for $500 (today $18,000), and constructed its first building between 1892 and 1894, for $4,500 (today $161,000). The building held not only a sanctuary, but also had a ritual bath, rooms for a Talmud Torah, and quarters for a gabbai (sexton/beadle). At that time the members also hired Simon Ratner as a cantor and ritual slaughterer, but had no rabbi. This was common for the congregation which, until the 1960s, "although steadily having a cantor-schochet, engaged rabbis only sporadically."

The members formed a burial society in 1895.

== First half of the 20th century ==
In 1904, annual dues were $8 (today $290) per year. The following year, a number of members seceded from House of Israel to form a new North Adams synagogue called Chevre Chai Odom. In February 1909, the members of Chevre Chai Odom purchased 0.5 acres (2,000 m^{2}) in Clarksburg for use as a cemetery, near House of Israel's cemetery. In October of that year they purchased a house on Ashland Street for $2,800 (today $100,000), and converted it for use as a synagogue. The Francis Street synagogue was later converted for use as residential apartments, and was still standing in the 1990s.

By 1918, North Adams' Jewish population was around 500. While it had no rabbi, House of Israel did have a cantor, and held services daily in Hebrew. Its religious school (which also had classes daily) had 62 students.

In 1920, the congregation purchased the former Bijou Theater, which had been a vaudeville theater and opera house, located on Center Street, for $25,000 (today $402,000), and renovated it for use as a synagogue. The synagogue formally incorporated as United House of Israel in 1922, and the following year paid off its mortgage. In January 1925, the congregation hired its first rabbi, Irving Miller. That year, he and House of Israel's president Harry Abrams brought Clarence Darrow, Rabbi Abba Hillel Silver and prison warden Lewis Edward Lawes to North Adams as speakers; the talks were so popular that they had to be held in the Drury High School auditorium. Irving stayed only one year, and United House of Israel did not hire another rabbi until 1936, when they elected Moses Mescheloff to the pulpit; he stayed until 1937, before becoming the first rabbi in Miami Beach, Florida, at Beth Jacob Congregation.

== Second half of the 20th century ==
The Center Street synagogue was condemned in 1958 for an urban renewal project that elevated Massachusetts Route 2 and directed it away from North Adams' Main Street. The project prompted the merger of United House of Israel with Chevre Chai Odom. The merged synagogue adopted the name of the larger United House of Israel, and began holding its regular services in Chevre Chai Odom's Ashland Street building. High Holy Days services were held in the Drury High School auditorium in 1959, and in the two following years at the North Adams Masonic Temple.

Then-rabbi Abraham Halbfinger accepted a position in Quebec, Canada in 1960. That same year the congregation purchased a mansion at 265 Church Street, and hired the architectural firm of Leon Einhorn of Albany, New York, to design a new building for the location. Construction was delayed when the original contractors went bankrupt in 1961, and new contractors were not hired until April of that year. The synagogue hired Earl Fishhaut, an Orthodox rabbi, as its spiritual leader in June. In October, the congregation adopted its current name, Congregation Beth Israel, and in December, it occupied its new building on Church Street. The Church Street building was sold to the Commonwealth of Massachusetts in 1998 to become the music and performance center of the Massachusetts College of Liberal Arts (MCLA). However, in an agreement with MCLA, the congregation continued to use the building for its services until 2002.

=== Denominational affiliation ===
Beth Israel was Orthodox from its founding, but ended the traditional practice of separate seating for men and women just before its move to its Church Street building in 1961. It did, however, hire an Orthodox rabbi in 1961, and did not hire a Conservative rabbi in until 1969, when it affiliated with Conservative Judaism. Beth Israel began counting women towards the minyan in the late 1970s. In 1995, the congregation disaffiliated from the United Synagogue of Conservative Judaism and remained unaffiliated for five years. In 2000, the congregation affiliated with the Reform movement and became a member of the Union for Reform Judaism. That year, following his ordination at Hebrew Union College in New York City, Jeffrey Wolfson Goldwasser joined the congregation as its spiritual leader.

== Events since 2000 ==
The current synagogue building at 53 Lois Street was completed in 2003. The 6,000-square-foot (560 m^{2}) building at the foot of Mount Williams and Mount Greylock has an unusual almond-shaped or eye-shaped design with large, floor-to-ceiling windows in the sanctuary overlooking the mountains and nearby wetlands. Designed by The Office of Michael Rosenfeld of West Acton, Massachusetts, the building has retractable walls that allow the library, social hall, and sanctuary into a single large room that can accommodate 230 people for High Holiday Services, or 150 people sitting at banquet tables. According to the architect, "[t]he building is fully integrated into its surroundings, curving and undulating in response to the surrounding hills", and "[b]virtue of the integration of the building with its site, as well as the use of custom movable partitions, it creates an atmosphere that is at once intimate and awesome". In addition to the Lois Street building, the congregation owns and operates Beth Israel cemetery on Walker Street in Clarksburg, Massachusetts.

Rachel Barenblat succeeded Goldwasser, becoming the congregation's rabbi in 2011, the year she was ordained by ALEPH: The Alliance for Jewish Renewal. The author of several books, her blog, Velveteen Rabbi, was named one of the top 25 internet sites by Time magazine in 2008.

== See also ==
- History of the Jews in the United States
