= George Chlitsios =

Greek conductor and composer

George Chlitsios (Greek: Γιώργος Χλίτσιος; 25 March 1969 in Volos, Greece) is a Greek conductor and composer.

== Studies ==
Chlitsios studied music at the Epirotic Conservatory of Ioannina, piano and composition with Aspasia Zerva and viola with Sophocles Politis and Nikos Kardaris. With the support of the Tsakalof Institute, he completed his undergraduate studies in orchestral conducting at Rotterdam Conservatorium and at the Royal Academy in Hague and after a 4-year scholarship by the Academy of Athens, continued his postgraduate and doctoral studies at London College of Music, at Thames Valley University and at the University of Surrey in England. He also attended master classes at Manhattan School of Music in New York.

== Music career ==
Maestro Chlitsios holds the position of permanent conductor of the Symphony Orchestra Tsakalof since 1993. He has conducted concerts and world premieres in major Greek cities (Ioannina, Athens, Kifisia, Filothei, Xanthi, Serres, Larisa, Corfu, Arta, Preveza, Igoumenitsa, Rhodes etc.) as well as in Europe (Spain, France, Germany, England, Albania, etc.) and since 1996 he is principal conductor of the Epirotiki Opera Tsakalof.

As guest conductor he has also conducted the Pro Arte Orchestra (Vienna 1991), Rotterdams Conservatorium Symphonie Orkest (Netherlands 1992), LCM Symphony Orchestra (London 1994), LCM Contemporary Ensemble (London 1995), The Athens State Philharmonic Orchestra (Athens 1997), State Ballet of Plovdiv (Ioannina 2002), New Sounds String Orchestra (Tirana 2002, Sarajevo 2005, Greece 2006), National Opera of Albania (Tirana 2004), Albanian Radiotelevision Symphony Orchestra (Tirana 2005), Sofia Philharmonic Orchestra (Bulgaria 2006), as well as other Greek and European symphonic ensembles.

Under his baton have performed soloists, such as the pianists Maria Cherogeorge-Sigara, Jenny Zaharieva, Aspasia Zerva, Charalambos Aggelopoulos, the violinists Simos Papanas, Evangjel Papadhimitri, Alessandra Farro, Zhang Yang, Ajlinda Mataj, Michalis Economou, Theodore Mouzakitis, the cellist Luo Bin, the bassoonist Alex Economou and many more debutant artists.

The decade 1987-1996 he developed a close relation and co-operation with the composer Costas P. Kydoniats and amongst others with conductors Arie van Beek, Jos van der Sijde, Jac van Steen, Ed Spanjaard, William Webb, Peter Stark, Wang Jin, Manuel Palau, Stuart Dunlop, George Hadjinikos, Andreas Paridis, Gustav Meier, Kenneth Keisler (New York 1995), Zubin Mehta (London 1997) etc.

Since 1990 he has taken part as violist in several chamber music ensembles, giving numerous concerts in Greece and abroad, while in 2005 he founded the “Junior Orchestra Tsakalof”, consisting of young string and wind students, aiming to initiate and to train them to symphonic music and repertoire.

Alongside his increased artistic activities, he teaches composition, violin, viola and chamber music at the Epirotic Conservatory of Ioannina, and since 2003 he is Director of the Municipal Conservatory of Preveza.

== Recordings ==
- Works by Kydoniatis, Skalkottas, Karbone, Massenet, Vivaldi and van Beurden, on a collector’s Edition Compact Disc (1995), which was recorded live in London and was issued by the Greek Ministry of Foreign Affairs, due to the international celebrations for the 50 years from the end of World War II.
- Works by Vivaldi, Mozart, Simoni and Skalkottas, with the New Sounds String Orchestra, recorded live in Tirana on 4 November 2002 (Tempo CD 0011-001).
- Works by Beethoven, Bizet and Strauss, with the Albanian Radiotelevision Symphony Orchestra, recorded live in Tirana on 2 November 2005.
- Works by Telemann, Schubert, Simoni, Bartok and Skalkottas, with the New Sounds String Orchestra, recorded live in Ioannina on 18 February 2006 (Tempo CD 0011-002).
- Works by Beethoven and Brahms, with the Sofia Philharmonic Orchestra, recorded live in Sofia, Bulgaria, on 20 April 2006.

== Repertoire ==
His repertoire includes all major symphonic works from the early baroque era to postmodern contemporary composers with expertise to the period 1830-1945. His wide repertoire is also enriched with major opera works by Mozart, Gluck, Verdi, Puccini, Bizet, Wagner etc.

== Membership ==
- Since 1987, Member of the Cultural Centre “Tsakalof” and the period 1993 until 2000 (8 years) has been elected in its board of directors
- Since 1993, Affiliate Member of the American Symphony Orchestra League, USA
- Since 1994, Full Member of the Incorporated Society of Musicians, London
- The period 1995-1997, Affiliate Member of the Friends of London Symphony Orchestra
- The period 1995-2006, Member of the Society for the Promotion of New Music (SPNM), UK
- Since 1996, Member of the Music Notation Modernization Association of USA
- Since 2000, Member of the Friends of English National Opera (E.N.O.), UK
- Since 2000, Member of the American Musicological Society, USA
