= Pengiran Anak Muhammad Ruzaini =

Bruneian prince (born 1983)

Muhammad Ruzaini محمد روزيني
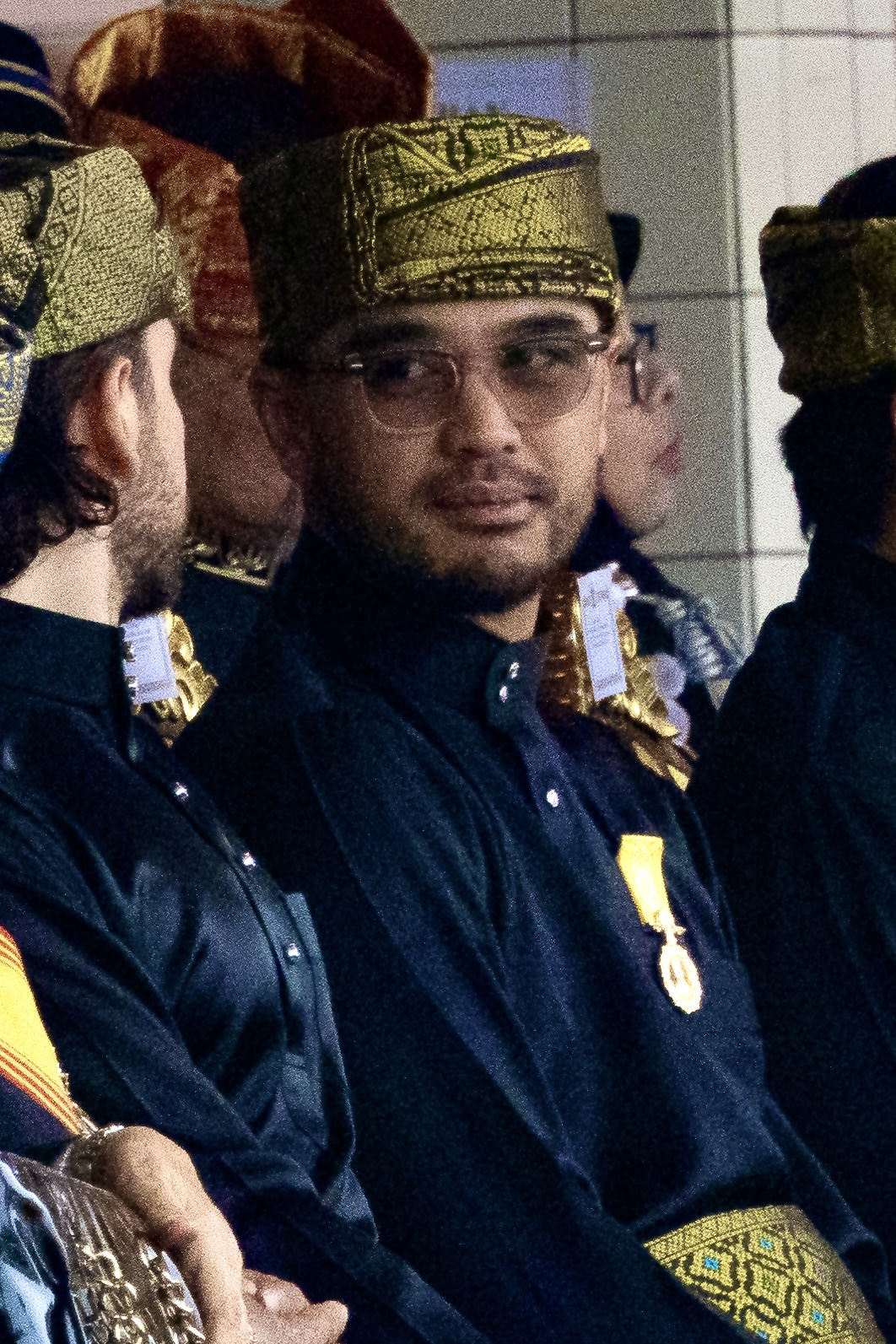
- Muhammad Ruzaini in 2024
- Born: Muhammad Ruzaini bin Mohd. Yakub; 18 January 1983 (age 43)
- Spouse: Princess Hafizah (m. 2012)
- Issue: Muhammad Za'eem; Muhammad Aamir; Abdul Hakeem; Abdul Aleem
- House: Bolkiah
- Father: Mohd. Yakub bin Othman
- Mother: Zainon binti Elias
- Education: University of Surrey; Coventry University; University of Leicester

Muhammad Ruzaini bin Mohd. Yakub (Jawi: محمد روزيني; born 18 January 1983) is a member of the royal family of Brunei as the husband of Princess Hafizah, a daughter of Sultan Hassanal Bolkiah.

== Early life ==
Ruzaini was born on 18 January 1983 to Pengiran Dr. Mohd. Yakub bin Pengiran Othman and Zainon binti Dato Paduka Elias. He is descended from Sultan Muhammad Alauddin of Brunei and has four siblings: Muhammad Afizan, Muhammad Tarmizi, Dr. Amalina, and Amal Aqilah.

== Education ==
Ruzaini completed his primary education at Brunei Malay Teachers Association School and his secondary education at St. Andrew's School. He earned seven GCE O Levels and three GCE A Levels.

In 2003, Ruzaini received a Certificate of Higher Education in Economics from the University of Surrey and in 2005 he graduated from Coventry University with a Bachelor of Arts degree with honors also in Economics. He later earned an MBA from University of Leicester.

== Marriage and issue ==
In September 2012, Ruzaini married Princess Hafizah in an elaborate celebration lasting over a week.

The Majlis Istiadat Berbedak Pengantin Diraja or powdering ceremony was held on the 19th at Istana Nurul Iman. Hafizah and Ruzaini's families applied scented powder and oils to their hands to bless them. The next day was the Majlis Istiadat Akad Nikah Diraja or solemnisation ceremony at Omar Ali Saifuddien Mosque where they were officially married. The Majlis Bersanding Pengantin Diraja and Majlis Persantapan Diraja which was a large banquet at Istana Nurul Iman on the 23rd.

Foreign dignitaries at the wedding included Yingluck Shinawatra, Benigno Aquino III, Hun Sen, K. Shanmugam, Musa Aman, and Abdul Taib Mahmud.

Ruzaini and Hafizah have four sons. They all have the style of Yang Amat Mulia and the title of Pengiran Anak.

- Muhammad Za'eem (born 3 August 2013)
- Muhammad Aamir (born 13 February 2015)
- Abdul Hakeem (born 19 February 2018)
- Abdul Aleem (born 16 June 2020)

== Career ==
In 2006, Ruzaini started working for the Government of Brunei as a marketing officer in the Civil Aviation Department of the Ministry of Communications. From 2009 to 2013, he worked at the Prime Minister's Office in the Economics, Financial Development, and Planning Division.

In 2017, Ruzaini and his wife founded Miftah An-Nur Islamic International School. He is also the Chairman of ThreeG Media, a financial technology company.

== Royal duties ==
Ruzaini does not undertake royal duties himself but he often accompanies his wife, Princess Hafizah to events. He attended a Hari Raya celebration in May 2022 and the Family Harmony Festival in November 2023.

He is the President of the Zahara Charity Foundation that he founded with his wife.

== Titles, styles, and honours ==
Styles of Muhammad Ruzaini
- Reference style: Yang Amat Mulia
- Alternative style: His Highness

=== Titles and styles ===
Upon marriage, the Sultan bestowed him the style of Yang Amat Mulia and the title of Pengiran Anak.

- 18 January 1983 – 24 September 2012: Yang Mulia Pengiran Muhammad Ruzaini bin Pengiran Dr. Mohd. Yakub
- 24 September 2012 – present: Yang Amat Mulia Pengiran Anak Muhammad Ruzaini bin Pengiran Dr. Mohd. Yakub

=== Honours ===
- Sultan of Brunei Golden Jubilee Medal (5 October 2017)
