= Sheron Wray =

British dancer, teacher, choreographer (born 1941)

S. Ama Wray
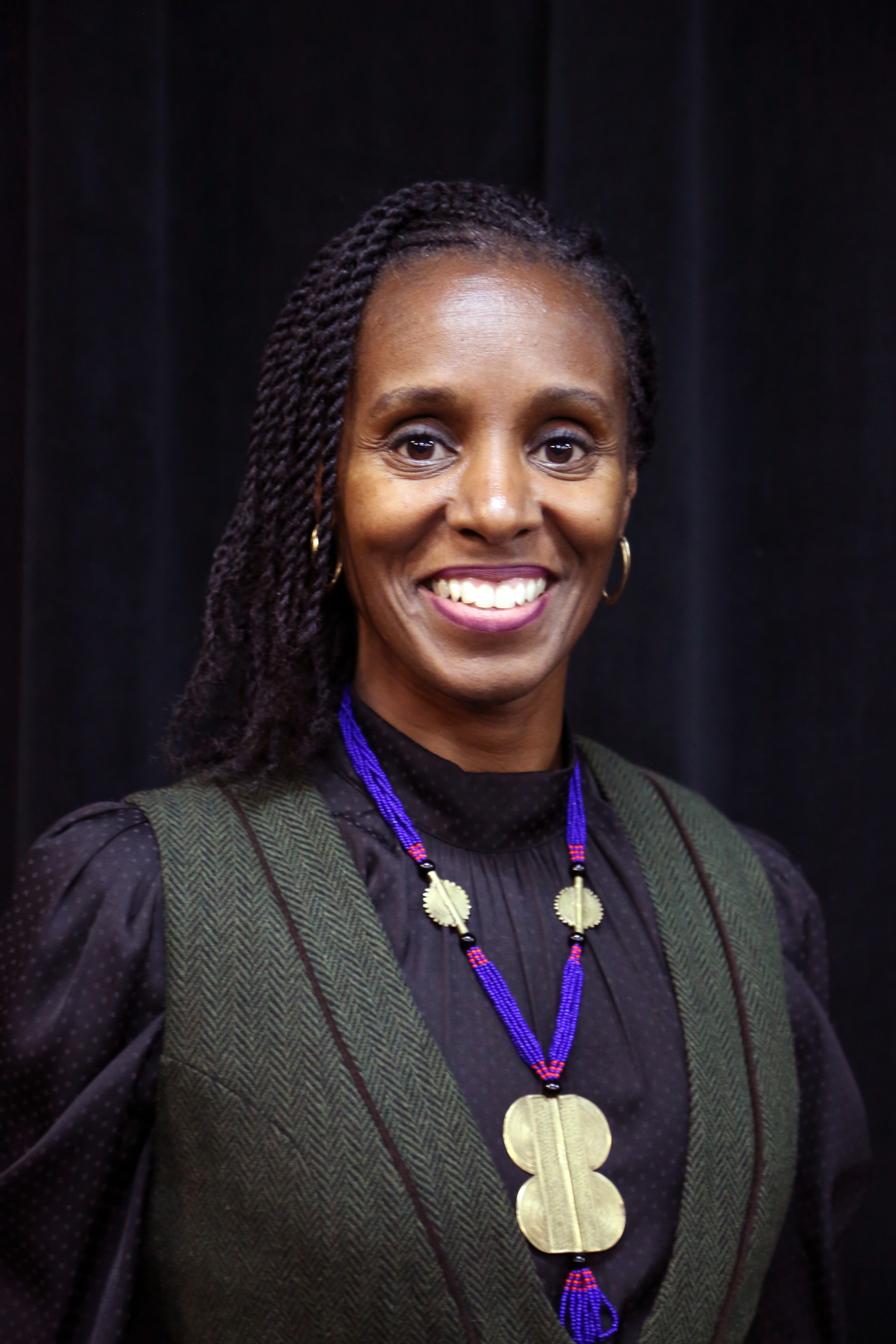
- photo by Aliza Rand
- Born: Sheron Wray; 1941 (age 84–85); England
- Occupations: Dancer, teacher, choreographer and theatre director
- Career
- Current group: JazzXchange
- Former groups: London Contemporary Dance Theatre Rambert Dance Company
- Dances: Contemporary

S. Ama Wray (born June 28, 1941), known formally as Sheron Wray, is a professor of dance at the University of California, Irvine, USA. She is a British dancer, teacher, choreographer and theatre director. She studied under Jane Dudley at the London Contemporary Dance School. She later performed with the London Contemporary Dance Theatre and the Rambert Dance Company before forming her own company called JazzXchange in 1992. She is presently an associate professor of dance at the Claire Trevor School of the Arts at the University of California, Irvine.

As a performer, Wray is best known for her Jane Dudley's Harmonica Breakdown and Texterritory, a piece integrating live text message participation from the audience. Texterritory has been performed in Trafalgar Square as part of London's 2012 Olympic Bid, the Soho Theatre, New York University and other international venues.

She was awarded a NESTA fellowship in 2003.

== Background ==
Wray's foundation and background are modern dance and training at the London Contemporary Dance School in Graham technique. She danced with the London Contemporary Dance Theatre Rambert Dance Company. The repertoire included works by Mark Morris, Bill T. Jones and Arnie Zane, Anthoy Tudor, Paul Taylor, Ohad Naharin, Dan Wagoner and Jane Dudley. Wray is widely known for her role as the leading performer and legal custodian of Harmonica Breakdown (1938), choreographed by Jane Dudley. As a custodian, she continues to restage the work.

In the UK, as the artistic director of JazzXchange Music and Dance Company, she created more than 30 works including collaborations with Wynton Marsalis, Derek Bermel, Gary Crosby and Julian Joseph. For the UK's 2012 Cultural Olympiad Festival, she was commissioned to choreograph The Brown Bomber, collaborating with composer Julian Joseph, performed at Queen Elizabeth Hall, London. As the recipient of the three-year NESTA Fellowship (National Endowment for Science Technology and the Arts), a synthesis of modern dance, jazz improvisation and West African performance aesthetics was conceptualized in the award-winning Texterritory, created in collaboration with Fleeta Siegel. Recent productions (2011) include Texterritory Congo, Digitally Ever Present and Texterritory USA (2008) with NYU's Experimental Theatre Wing.

Wray's engagement with the African Diaspora began in 2004 with study and research into African and Afro-Cuban dance taking place on the continent of Africa and the Caribbean. Her contemporary African works have been seen on the Ghana Dance Ensemble, Discreet Discoveries. Additionally, she has directed African-centred physical theatre plays by activist playwright/performer Mojisola Adebayo.

These plays include Muhammad Ali and Me, a semi-autobiographical one-woman performance that combines poetry, dance, a cappella singing, boxing and audience interaction and incorporates integrated British Sign Language, detailing the struggles associated with growing up black in a majority white area (Essex, Colchester). Wray also directed Mojisola Adebayo's Moj of the Antarctic, a play that pays homage to the life of Ellen Craft, as well as the artworks by queer photographer Del LaGrace Volcano. Muhammad Ali and Me and Moj of the Antarctic toured both the UK and Southern Africa, 2008–2010. Wray performed an improvised solo, Bodily Steps to Innovation, for TEDx in Southern California.

She is an assistant professor of Dance – University of California, Irvine and UCI. She directs The Ghana Project: an interdisciplinary research project including five different UCI schools (Humanities, Social Science, Education, Arts and Computer Science) and the University of Ghana, Legon. She received her master's degree from Middlesex University in the UK. In February 2013, she presented her theory of Multi-logics in West Africa's Performance at the Institute for Advanced Study, Princeton.

== Teaching ==
Wray has taught dance for more than twenty-five years. In January 2014, she taught Embodiology at the Martha Graham School in New York. She has held teaching positions with the Royal Ballet School and English National Ballet School (upper school – modern dance faculty), London Contemporary Dance School (modern), The Place (Professional class series). She has also undertaken teaching residencies with Carnegie Mellon University, University of Surrey, Middlesex University, Rick Odums Centre de Jazz Danse – Paris, James Carles – Toulouse, Centre National de Danse – Paris, DV8 Physical Theatre, Independent Dance (ID) and Mathew Bourne's New Adventures in London. She has also taught company classes for the Alvin Ailey American Dance Theatre.

== Professional membership ==
Since 2010, Wray has been a member of the Congress on Dance Research Board (CORD), a principal organization that profiles the work of dance scholars with its journal and annual international conferences. She has contributed to the Ghana Studies Journal and gives papers regularly at dance and interdisciplinary conferences. She is a member of the African Studies Association (ASA) and a founding member of the newly incorporated African Studies Association in Africa (ASAA). She has chaired and was a founding member of ADAD (Association of Dance of the African Diaspora) in the UK.

== Companies ==
- National Youth Dance Company, 1986
- London Contemporary Dance Theatre, 1988
- Rambert Dance Company, 1994
- JazzXchange, 1992

== Works ==
- Choreography for Carnival, 1999, opening ceremony of the Millennium Dome
- Red (as expected), 2001, Royal Opera House
- Lucky for Some, 2003, with Wynton Marsalis and the Lincoln Center Jazz Orchestra, Barbican Centre
- Harmonica Breakdown, 2003, New York City Center
