= John A. Pickett =

British chemist (born 1945)

Professor John Pickett CBE FRS FLSW
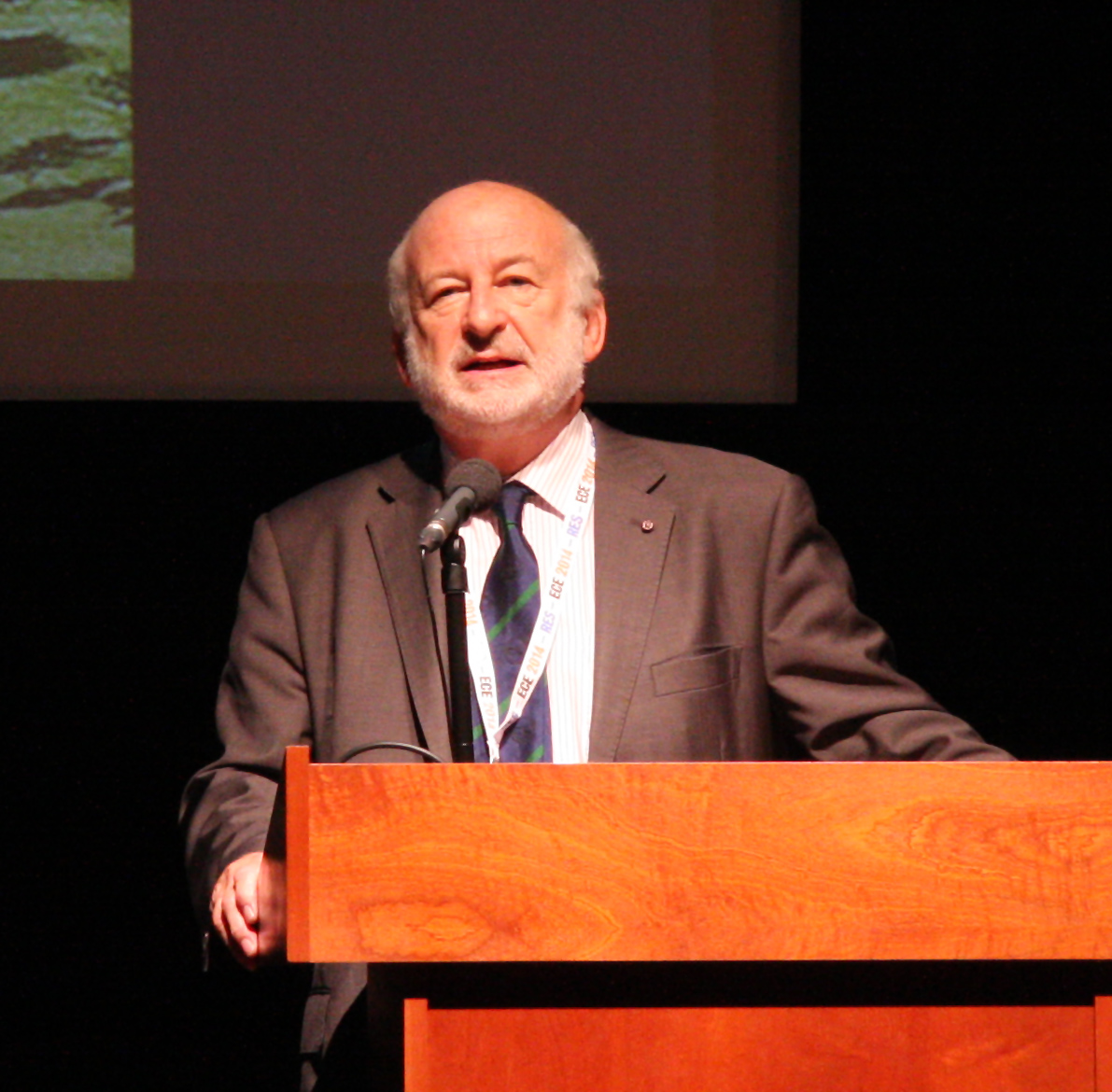
- Pickett delivering a keynote talk at the X^{th} European Congress of Entomology, York, 2014
- Born: 21 April 1945 (age 81)
- Education: University of Surrey; UMIST
- Awards: Wolf Prize in Agriculture
- Scientific career
- Fields: Chemistry
- Thesis: Compounds from hydrazine and dinitriles of possible use as blowing agents (1971)
- Website: www.cardiff.ac.uk/people/view/521655-pickett-john

John Anthony Pickett (born 21 April 1945) is a British chemist who is noted for his work on insect pheromones. Pickett is Professor of Biological Chemistry in the School of Chemistry at Cardiff University. He previously served as the Michael Elliott Distinguished Research Fellow at Rothamsted Research.

== Education ==
Pickett was educated at King Edward VII Grammar School, Coalville. He went on to study at the University of Surrey (formerly Battersea College of Technology) where he received his Bachelor of Science degree in honours chemistry in 1967 and PhD in 1971 under the supervision of Professor John Elvidge for research into compounds from dinitriles and hydrazine. He was awarded Doctor of Science (DSc) in 1993 by the University of Nottingham for his research into chemical ecology.

== Career and research ==
Following his PhD studies, Pickett began postdoctoral research at UMIST (the University of Manchester Institute of Science and Technology, now the University of Manchester) in the laboratory of Professor Robert N. Haszeldine FRS in 1970, on the synthesis and photochemistry of perfluoroalkylpyridazines. In 1972, he started his career in biological chemistry researching the flavour active chemistry of hops and malt in the Chemistry Department of the Brewing Research Foundation, Redhill.

In 1976 he joined the Insecticides and Fungicides Department (later the Department of Biological Chemistry) at Rothamsted Experimental Station (now Rothamsted Research) as Principal Scientific Officer leading and coordinating studies on semiochemical aspects of insect chemical ecology. He was appointed Head of Department in 1984 and, concurrently in 2007, Scientific Director of the Rothamsted Centre for Sustainable Pest and Disease Management. On his retirement from administrative positions in 2010, Pickett was awarded the first Michael Elliott Distinguished Research Fellow position at Rothamsted and returned to full time research in chemical ecology.

In 2017, he joined the School of Chemistry at Cardiff University as Professor of Biological Chemistry, from where he leads and collaborates research extending from chemical ecology to other aspects of biological chemistry.

Pickett has over 600 peer-reviewed scientific publications, and patents. His research specifically investigates the chemical identity of pheromones and other types of chemical signals (semiochemicals). Pickett led the first chemical characterizations, as novel molecular structures, of the sex related pheromones of insect vectors, of plant and human pathogens, including aphids, mosquitoes and sand flies. He leads new research into the biosynthetic routes to pheromones and other semiochemicals for practical exploitation. For sub-Saharan agriculture, semiochemicals are released from companion plants, including into the rhizosphere, for farm use particularly in collaboration with Professor Zeyaur R. Khan at the International Centre of Insect Physiology and Ecology, Kenya. He also contributes to the development of semiochemicals by molecular biological techniques and led the first field experiments expressing an insect pheromone in a crop, wheat, for potential defence against insect pests. Now, he is developing new research objectives for management of vectors of human pathogens particularly haematophagous (blood feeding) insects and the study of volatile chemical signalling from their human and farm animal hosts. With new collaborators in chemistry and insect neurophysiology at Cardiff University, he is investigating novel molecular interactions for reducing emissions, and the capture, of greenhouse gases.

== Awards and honours ==
Pickett has had a long association with the University of Nottingham and is an honorary professor (1991) quod reliquum est vitae, with associated lecturing and current collaborative research. Other scientific collaborations and lecturing have resulted in further awards including honorary doctorates and professorships:

1. Honorary DSc, University of Aberdeen, 2008
2. Bachelor of the University of Surrey, honoris causa, 2011
3. Honorary DSc, University of Surrey, 2016
4. Honorary DSc, University of Neuchâtel, Switzerland, 2016
5. Honorary Distinguished Professor, Cardiff University, 2016
6. Honorary Professor, School of Life Sciences, University of Warwick, 2017
7. Honorary Professor, College of Life and Environmental Sciences, University of Exeter, 2017
8. Honorary DSc, University of Hertfordshire, 2019
9. Honorary Professor, Center for R&D of Fine Chemicals, Guizhou University, 2025

The Royal Society elected Pickett to the Fellowship in 1996, and he delivered the Croonian Lecture in 2008 to the Royal Society on Plant and Animal Communication. International academic recognition was in elected as Member of the Deutsche Akademie der Naturforscher Leopoldina in 2001 and in 2014 he was elected International Member of the National Academy of Sciences (United States) for his role as "an international driving force in the science and application of chemical ecology and in fostering advances in integrated pest management and agricultural sustainability".

Particularly for his achievements in biological chemistry and its application to agriculture, he was awarded Rank Prize, Nutrition and Crop Husbandry in 1995. He received a CBE from the Queen in 2004 for services to biological chemistry. In 2008, Pickett won jointly, with James H. Tumlinson (Penn State University), and W. Joe Lewis (University of Georgia, Tifton) the Wolf Prize in Agriculture, "for their remarkable discoveries of mechanisms governing plant-insect and plant-plant interactions, their scientific contributions on chemical ecology have fostered the development of integrated pest management and significantly advanced agricultural". As laureate of the Wolf Prize he presented at and chaired the Agriculture and Food Summit of the Word Laureates 3rd Forum, 2020.

For specific chemistry awards, for example, he was awarded the International Society of Chemical Ecology Medal 2002, the Bruker Award (NMR) and Plenary Lecture given at the Phytochemical Society Europe meeting, Copenhagen, 2016 and the Sterling B. Hendricks Memorial Lectureship given at 254th American Chemical Society National Meeting, 2017. Pickett is a member/fellow of multiple other global scientific societies including the Royal Society of Chemistry for over 50 years, the Royal Swedish Academy of Agriculture and Forestry, 2005 and the Chemical Society of Ethiopia 2010. He was elected President of the International Society of Chemical Ecology in 1995 and of the Royal Entomological Society in 2014. Reflecting his recent appointment to Cardiff University and his growing chemical research for regional development of agriculture and animal husbandry, he was elected Fellow of the Learned Society of Wales in 2020. Pickett’s outstanding achievements as a researcher have been recognized by election in 2026 to membership of the Academia Europaea.

== Personal life ==
He married Ulla Birgitta Skålèn in 1970, they have a daughter and a son.
