= Suzannah Olivier =

British academic

Suzannah Endfield Olivier is an author, journalist, and nutritionist. She is the daughter of film director Cy Endfield.

Olivier is the author of more than fifteen books on health and nutrition, including The Breast Cancer Prevention and Recovery Diet, Natural Hormone Balance, 500 of the Most Stress Busting Techniques You'll Ever Need, Food Medicine, Healthy Food for Happy Kids, and What Should I Feed My Baby?.
