= David Ebsworth =

British businessman (born 1954)

- Born: 1954 (age 71–72)
- Education: Duke of Yorks Royal Military School; University of Surrey
- Occupation: Non-executive chairman
- Years active: 1980-
- Known for: Chairman, Pharmaceutical industry

David Ebsworth is non-executive chairman at Verona Pharma Plc. His career spans over 35 years in the global pharmaceutical industry, during which he was Global Head of Pharmaceuticals at Bayer AG and CEO of a number of companies, including ViforPharma and Galenica. He is also an advisor to a variety of CEOs at public and private organisations.

== Education ==
Ebsworth was educated in Germany, Singapore and England at the Duke of Yorks Royal Military School He gained his BSc in chemistry and German in 1976 and his Ph.D. in industrial relations in 1980 from the University of Surrey. Ebsworth received an honorary doctorate from the University of New Haven in 2000.

In 2001, he was awarded the 'Global Citizen of the Year' award from the Seton Hall University in New Jersey.

== Career ==
Ebsworth began his career at Pfizer in Germany. In 1983, he moved to Bayer AG, where he ultimately served as the president of North American business and the global head of pharmaceuticals. He was with the company for more than 19 years before he resigned in 2002.

After working at Bayer, Ebsworth was named the chief executive officer of Oxford Glycosciences, a biotech company listed on the London Stock Exchange and Nasdaq. Following the company's sale to Celltech in 2003, he became chairman of a number of organisations, such as Wilex AG and A&D Pharma Holdings NV, as well as joining the board at SkyePharma PLC and other companies.

Ebsworth was the CEO of Vifor Pharma for 5 years from 2009, and also the CEO of Galencia Group from 2011. Notably, during his tenure as the CEO of Galenica Group, the company's value increased from CHF 2.4 billion to CHF 5.6 billion, with the company receiving two FDA approvals and one EMA approval.

Ebsworth is currently an advisor to the CEO of Vifor Pharma and Galencia Santé, which now has a market cap of just under $10bn.

In 2013, he set up the David Ebsworth Scholarship, which was worth £3,000 per year for four years, to help students who wanted to study German at the University of Surrey. Here, he has also founded the David Ebsworth Prize for Best Performance in the Professional Training Year and the David Ebsworth Student Opportunities Fund.

== Non-Executive Positions ==
Ebsworth is non-executive chairman of the board of directors at Verona Pharma, the drug development company focused on respiratory disease treatment.

He has served on a number of boards across the pharma, biotech and healthcare sectors, in the UK, Germany, the US, Austria, Italy, Israel, Netherlands, and Japan. He has also advised venture capital and private equity companies.
