= Emma Mulqueeny =

British technologist and educator

Emma Mulqueeny OBE
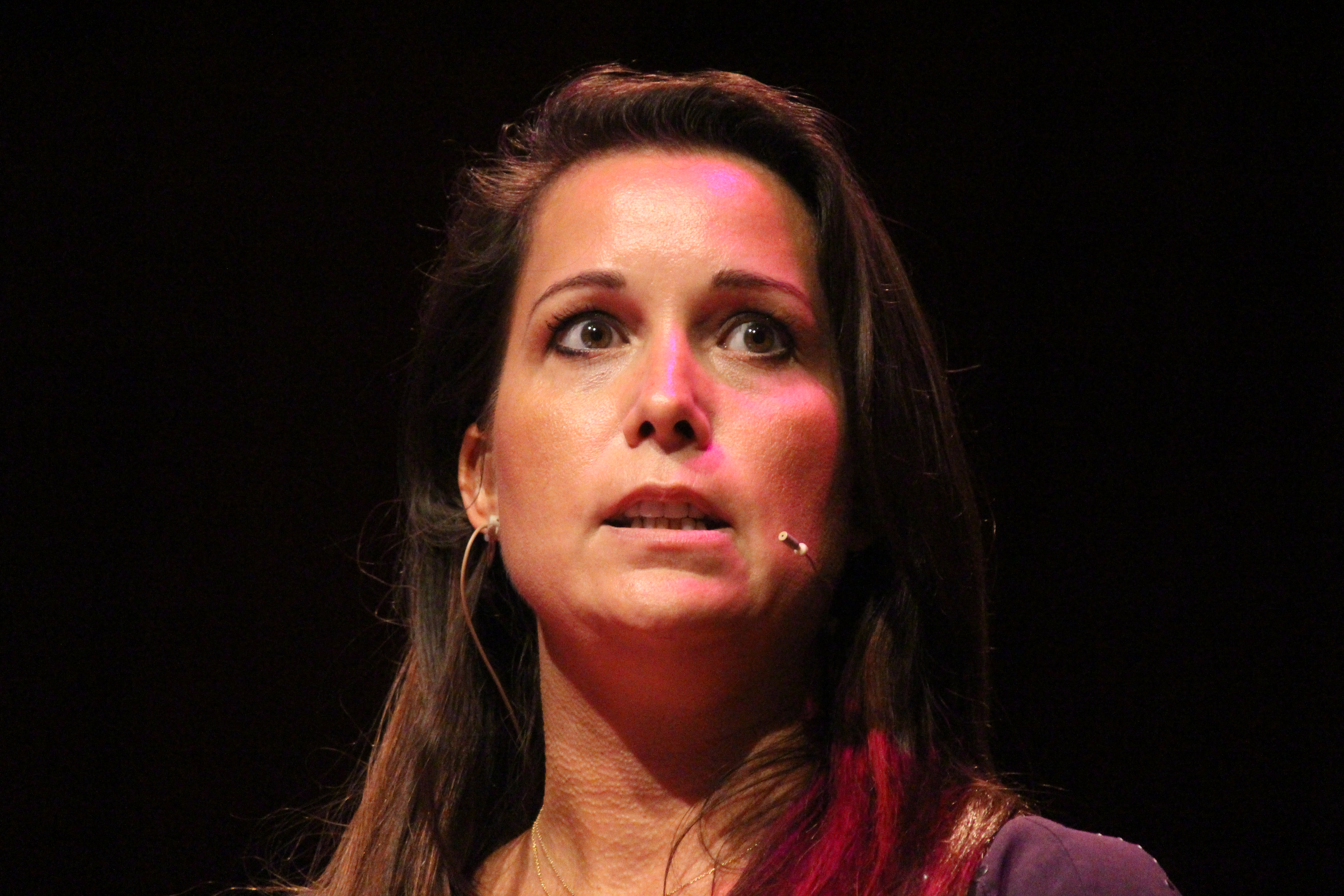
- Mulqueeny speaking at Wikimania 2014 at the Barbican Centre, London
- Born: Emma Elizabeth Knight; 12 July 1971 (age 55); Sidcup, Kent, England
- Known for: Young Rewired State
- Website: mulqueeny.wordpress.com

Emma Elizabeth Mulqueeny OBE (née Knight; born 12 July 1971) is a British technologist and educator. She is best known for co-founding Rewired State and Young Rewired State, which provided a community and events for technically gifted young people. She has campaigned for computer programming to be taught from an early age in UK schools to encourage wider uptake and increased diversity in the tech sector.

== Career ==
Mulqueeny served on the House of Commons' Speaker's Commission on Digital Democracy and was a 2014 Google Personal Democracy Fellow. She has written for different media organisations, including The Daily Telegraph and The Guardian.

=== Awards and honours ===
Mulqueeny was voted onto the Wired magazine 100 list, Tech City 100 and British Interactive Media Association (BIMA) Hot 10. She was voted one of the top ten women in technology by The Guardian and was named in the top ten Tech Heroes for Good by NESTA.

She was appointed as an Officer of the Order of the British Empire (OBE) in the 2016 Birthday Honours for services to technology and education.

== Personal life ==
Mulqueeny lives in Surrey with her two daughters.
