= Sein Tun =

- စိန်ထွန်း
- Born: 1939; Rangoon, British Burma
- Died: 24 January 2011 (aged 71–72); Yangon, Myanmar
- Other name: Sein Htoon
- Education: St. Paul's High School; Rangoon University (B.Sc. Physics, 1962); University of Surrey (M.Sc. Physics, 1967) (Ph.D. Physics, 1973)
- Occupation: Physicist
- Known for: Head of Yangon University's physics department

Sein Tun (Burmese: စိန်ထွန်း, also spelt Sein Htoon) was a Burmese physicist, who taught at the Yangon University from 1994 until his retirement in 2006. He also authored teaching materials for advanced physics and was a member of the Science Council and a fellow at the Institute of Physics.
