= Remitly =

American online remittance company

- Type: Public
- Traded as: Nasdaq: RELY; S&P 600 component
- Industry: Financial services
- Founded: 2011; 15 years ago
- Founders: Sebastian J. Gunningham (CEO); Josh Hug (COO); Shivaas Gulati (Head of Engineering)
- Headquarters: Seattle, United States
- Revenue: ▲US$1.64 billion (2025)
- Net income: ▲US$67.9 million (2025)
- Total assets: ▲US$1.46 billion (2025)
- Total equity: ▲US$869 million (2025)
- Number of employees: 2,700 (2023)
- Website: www.remitly.com

Remitly is an American online remittance service based in Seattle, United States that offers international money transfers to over 170 countries. It was founded in 2011 by Matthew Oppenheimer, Josh Hug, and Shivaas Gulati and became publicly traded on the Nasdaq exchange in September 2021.

== History ==
Remitly was founded in 2011 as BeamIt Mobile. The company was initially a search engine for remittance services but shifted into money transfers soon after. It changed its name from BeamIt to Remitly in August 2012.

In April 2013, Remitly announced that it would allow its users to send free money transfers to the Philippines. This was the first international destination to which the company could deliver money transfers. In 2017, the company's services became available in all 50 states in the U.S., with Massachusetts being the final state that Remitly was allowed to operate in. By March 2018, Remitly had expanded its services to allow people from the United States, United Kingdom, Canada, and Australia to send money to the Philippines, India, Mexico, Colombia, Ecuador, El Salvador, Guatemala, Honduras, Nicaragua, and Peru.

Remitly became publicly traded on the Nasdaq exchange on September 23, 2021. The company's initial public offering of seven million shares generated approximately $300 million in new funding.

== Services ==
Remitly allowed people in 30 countries to carry out transfers of money in approximately 100 currencies to 170 countries, as of July 2024. The service operates electronically rather than via physical premises. Recipients in some countries might be able to receive funds via bank deposit, mobile money, and cash pickup.

== Fraud and allegations ==
=== Customer complaints and fund holds ===
A 2026 investigation by Hindenburg Papers documented a pattern of complaints in which Remitly's fraud-detection algorithms flagged legitimate transactions, froze funds, and labeled customers as "scammers" with limited recourse for appeal. The investigation cited cases in which transfers were marked as "delivered" while recipients' banks confirmed that no funds had been received. In one documented instance, a sender attempting to transfer $3,150 for a relative's medical procedure uploaded identification five times, with each submission rejected for unspecified reasons, while customer service offered only that "they are working on it."

Consumer complaint platforms have recorded hundreds of similar grievances. On the Better Business Bureau (BBB) platform, Remitly had received over 970 complaints as of 2026. On ComplaintsBoard, the company held a 2.1-out-of-5 reputation rating based on 14 reviews and 47 complaints. Common allegations include funds being frozen without explanation, contradictory information from customer service representatives, repeated requests for the same documentation, and delays in fraud investigations lasting months.

=== Regulatory and industry context ===
In September 2024, the Consumer Financial Protection Bureau (CFPB) proposed amendments to the Remittance Transfer Rule under Regulation E, with final amendments anticipated in Spring 2025. CFPB data indicated that while Remitly had a 96% timely response rate to complaints, 17.6% of resolved complaints were disputed by consumers meaning customers did not accept the company's proposed resolutions.

The Hindenburg Papers investigation also noted broader industry patterns, citing a CFPB and New York Attorney General lawsuit against MoneyGram in April 2025 alleging that the company "stranded customers waiting for their money when it failed to deliver funds promptly to recipients abroad."

=== Short-seller report ===
In March 2025, Spruce Point Capital Management, a New York-based investment firm specializing in forensic research and short-selling, issued a "Strong Sell" opinion on Remitly Global, Inc. (Nasdaq: RELY). The firm's report, titled "Why We Mistrust Remitly," alleged that the company had used "dubious customer testimonials and doctored Trustpilot reviews." According to Spruce Point, a reverse image search revealed that customer review photographs including images of smiling women wearing traditional saris and head coverings were stock photos rather than authentic customer images. The firm also accused Remitly of manipulating review ratings on its website and expressed concerns about governance, including executive departures and a history of material weaknesses.

Spruce Point estimated a 40–55% potential long-term downside risk for Remitly's shares, or $9.00–$12.00 per share, citing concerns about uncertainty regarding U.S. immigration policies and displacement risk from cryptocurrency adoption. Remitly did not respond to multiple requests for comment from Spruce Point or from Fortune regarding the report.
