= David Markus =

American lawyer

David Evan Markus (born 1973) is an American attorney and rabbi. He is the first full-time U.S. judicial officer serving a rabbinic pulpit.

He currently serves as Referee and Special Counsel for Access to Justice in the New York Supreme Court, Ninth Judicial District, and rabbi of Congregation Shir Ami (Greenwich, Connecticut).

Markus formerly served as Special Counsel to the New York State Senate Majority and as co-chair of ALEPH: Alliance for Jewish Renewal, a leader of Jewish Renewal movement. Markus resides in Westchester County, New York.

== Education and early career ==
A 1994 honors graduate of Williams College, Markus earned his Juris Doctor with high honors from Harvard Law School, where he was a member of the a cappella group Scales of Justice, and his Masters in Public Policy from Harvard University's John F. Kennedy School of Government in 2001, where he was awarded Markus the Wilmers Fellowship for State and Local Government. While still a student, Harvard designated Markus an "Innovator in Public Service" for his work to improve legislative processes and government transparency using state-level C-SPAN public affairs systems—work that prompted other states to explore gavel-to-gavel coverage of their governments and for which Markus won the national Goldsmith Award. Previously Markus had served as policy assistant to environmental activist Robert F. Kennedy Jr., and as legislative director to New York State Assembly Member Sandy Galef (D-Westchester).

Markus was ordained as a rabbi by the seminary of ALEPH: Alliance for Jewish Renewal in January 2015 after six years of study. Markus also holds dual ordination as a spiritual director, also from ALEPH.

== Career ==
=== Judiciary service ===
In 2001, after passing the New York Bar, Markus was appointed Law Clerk to New York Court of Appeals Associate Judge Albert M. Rosenblatt. He then was appointed Special Counsel for Programs and Policy under Chief Judges Judith Kaye and Jonathan Lippman. In this role, Markus helped guide the Judiciary's legislative program to reform New York's civil and criminal justice systems, as well as numerous blue-ribbon panels including the Special Commission on the Future of the New York State Courts, and the Commission on Indigent Defense Services.

=== Teaching ===
While working for the New York State Judiciary, Markus also served as Adjunct Professor of Political Science at Fordham University, where he taught courses on public policy, U.S. government and judicial policy, and served as Adjunct Professor of Public Administration at Pace University, where he taught administrative law and policy in the graduate Master in Public Administration program.

=== Gubernatorial and presidential campaigns ===
In 2006, Markus staffed the Transition Working Group on Government Reform for the incoming administration of New York Governor Eliot Spitzer and Lt. Governor David Paterson.

In 2008, Markus took leaves of absence from the Judiciary to join Barack Obama's presidential campaign. During the primaries, Markus served as a voter protection counsel in Indiana and Pennsylvania. During the 2008 general election, Markus was appointed Deputy Director for Voter Protection in Pennsylvania.

=== Special Counsel to the Senate Majority ===
On March 9, 2009, the New York Senate announced Markus' appointment as Special Counsel to the Senate Majority, focusing on government operations and structure, cities and local governments, the Judiciary, the civil and criminal justice systems, and public integrity. He served as lead staff litigator during the historic [2009 New York State Senate leadership crisis], and as leadership's lead legislative attorney for constitutional, Judiciary and government reform matters. He returned to the Judiciary at the end of the 2009-10 session.

=== Return to judicial service ===
Markus returned to the New York State Judiciary in early 2011, when he was named Deputy Counsel and cross-designated as Referee in Supreme Court, Ninth Judicial District. In this capacity, Markus presided over foreclosure conferences and published several reported decisions. In 2013, Markus was appointed to preside in compliance conferences in Supreme Court's civil term, where he manages a docket of 400 civil actions.

=== Rabbinical service ===
Markus served as co-rabbi of Temple Beth-El of City Island until 2023 and now serves Congregation Shir Ami, Greenwich, CT.Markus also was named a Fellow of Rabbis Without Borders. From 2015-2017 he served as Co-Chair of ALEPH, the umbrella organization for Jewish Renewal. He has served as syndicated blogger for My Jewish Learning, The Wisdom Daily, and The Jewish Studio. He formerly served as instructor in rabbinics and as a member of the hashpa'ah (spiritual direction) faculty at the ALEPH Ordination Program and serves on the faculty of the Academy for Jewish Religion.

=== Literary career ===
In 2008, Markus first published his works in Jewish haiku. His most popular haiku appear in weekly Facebook postings and, as of mid-2010, there are rumors of a forthcoming book. With a special Sukkot haiku (Bountiful harvest, / Internal tangles untied, / Now time to give thanks. Shabbes!) in 2010, Markus began publishing his haiku via Twitter, where he also created the hash tag #haikus4jews. Markus has also published a series of haiku relating to his political experiences.

With Rachel Barenblat, he co-edited Beside Still Waters: A Journey of Comfort and Renewal (Ben Yehuda, 2019), ISBN 1934730017, 978-1934730010. He is also the editor of A Year of Building Torah (Bayit, 2022), ISBN 979-8985209129.
