= Rewire: Digital Cosmopolitans in the Age of Connection =

English-language nonfiction book by Ethan Zuckerman, published in 2013

Rewire
- Author: Ethan Zuckerman
- Subject: Globalization
- Publisher: W. W. Norton & Company
- Publication date: June 17, 2013
- Publication place: United States
- Pages: 312
- ISBN: 978-0393082838

Rewire: Digital Cosmopolitans in the Age of Connection is a 2013 nonfiction book about contemporary globalization and xenophilia by American blogger Ethan Zuckerman of MIT. It describes homophilic barriers to cosmopolitanism such as filter bubbles and media bias. Zuckerman calls for a strenuously internationalized media and cultural literacy empowered by language translation. He cites the work of scholars Kwame Anthony Appiah, Ronald Stuart Burt, Mark Granovetter, and Robert D. Putnam, and of cosmopolitan exemplars Matt Harding, Erik Hersman, Dhani Jones, Roland Soong, Global Voices Online, Härnu, Meedan, and Tea Leaf Nation.

== See also ==
- Machine translation
- Computer-assisted translation
- Parachute journalism
- Third culture kid
