= Schmiede Hallein =

Coordinates: 47°44′5.15″N 13°3′50.80″E

Schmiede Hallein is a media and art festival taking place since 2003 during September in Hallein, Austria. During a period of ten days international participants work on projects in a former industrial building. It focuses on music productions, film, photography and performances.

== Participation ==
Schmiede receives over 200 applications from more than 20 countries every year, of which 80% are accepted and an additional 30 guests are invited. The participants are called Smiths and form a community beyond the festival. Participation has been free of charge in earlier years but in 2010 a €50 participation fee was introduced.

== Location ==
Schmiede Hallein takes place in a former salt refinery, a building that also hosts other cultural events in Hallein and the Salzburg Summeracadamy. The somewhat isolated location allows participants to focus on their projects without distraction.

== Sponsorship ==
The festival is supported by a range of companies and institutions ranging from the city of Hallein to federal ministries: Kulturland Salzburg, city of Hallein, BM:UKK, WIBERG, FM4, Red Bull Music Academy, Kunstraum Pro Arte in Hallein, Carhartt Europe, MusicImport: CAD, Mackie und Aphex, Tourismusverband Hallein
