= Rewired State =

- Founded: 2008
- Founders: James Darling, Emma Mulqueeny, Richard Pope
- Location: UK

Rewired State was an organisation which ran a series of hack days for programmers and designers, focused on improving access to UK government open data and encouraging innovation in government services.

Rewired State was founded by James Darling, Emma Mulqueeny, and Richard Pope in 2008. The first event, National Hack the Government Day, was held on 7 March 2009 at the Guardian offices in King's Cross, London. Over 80 people attended producing over 30 hacks. Judges at Rewired State events included Tom Watson MP and Dr Sue Black. Sponsors included the Government Digital Service, mySociety, and Nesta. National Hack the Government Day ran annually until 2015.

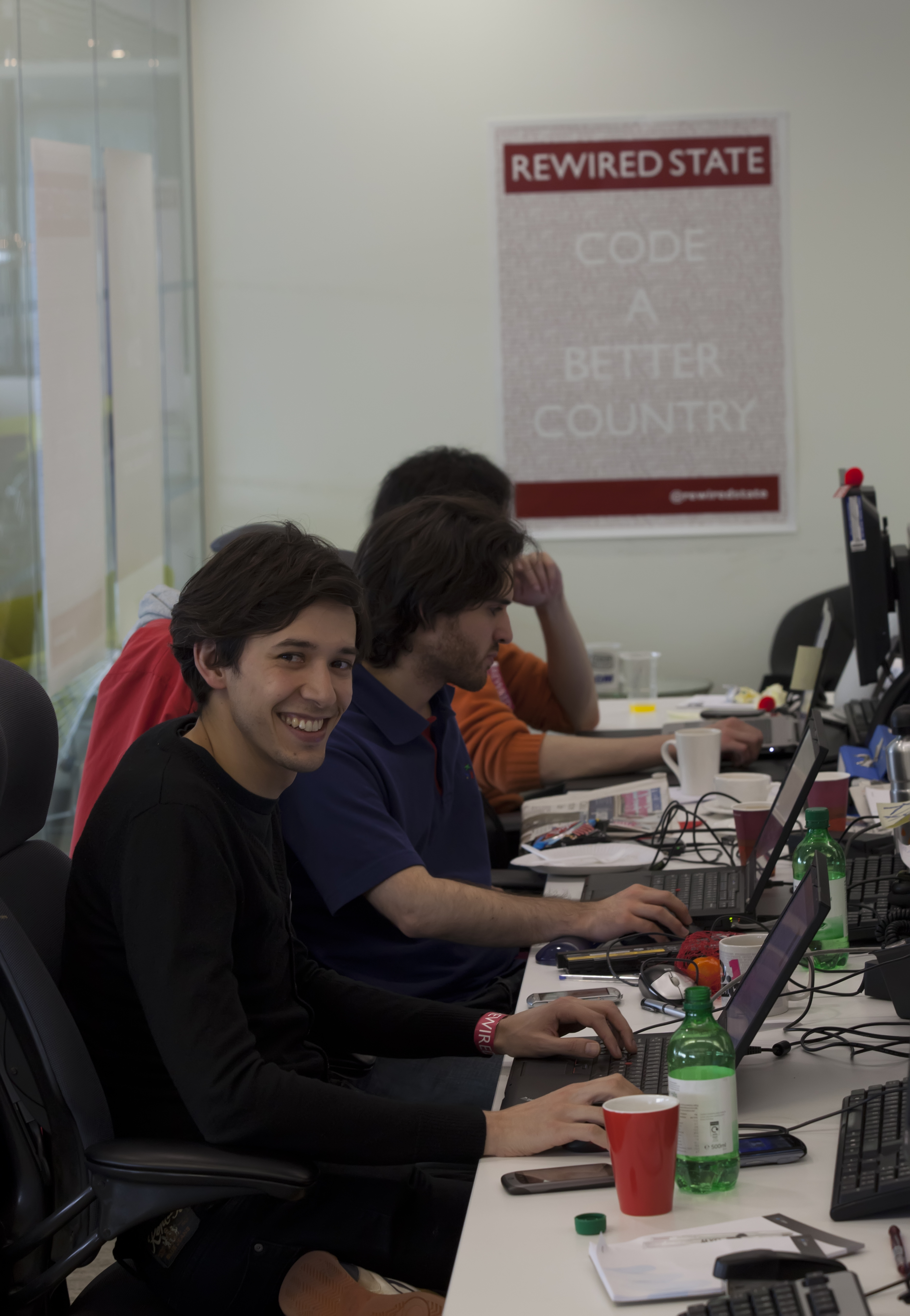
Attendees at the 2011 National Hack the Government Day

== Parliament Hack ==
Between 2011 and 2013, Rewired State ran a series of Parliament Hack events in association with the UK Parliament, with the aim to build new apps using parliamentary data.

== Young Rewired State ==
Rewired State formed a sister organisation, Young Rewired State, to bring young developers together to solve real world problems. Young Rewired State ran its own series of Festival of Code hack days from 2009. The last event run by Young Rewired State was the 2015 Festival of Code, and the organisation was formally dissolved in February 2019. Young Rewired State also ran various "Hyperlocal" centres across the UK, which provide coding challenges across the year, rather than being focused on one week as in the Festival of Code.

Many developers who participated in Young Rewired State events learned coding skills outside the traditional school curriculum.

=== Festival of Code ===
Between 2009 and 2015, Young Rewired State held a national five-day hackathon where attendees across the UK took part in a competition to make an application including at least one piece of open government data. This event was initially called "Young Rewired State", but was renamed in 2012 to the "Festival of Code".

In 2009, when the event first started, there were only 50 participants attending a weekend at Google's London offices. This number rose to roughly a thousand young people participating across United Kingdom and in centres in other countries. Between the first event in 2009 and the penultimate event in 2015 the proportion of female participants rose from 2% to 30%.

In 2016, it was announced that year's Festival of Code would be postponed to 2017, but the event did not occur in 2017 or in subsequent years.

== Other events ==
Rewired State also ran a number of other government data hack days including Rewired State: Culture, (H)activate, Middle East Hack, Follow the Data, and Carbon and Energy Hack Weekend.

== Last event and closure ==
National Hack the Government Day and other events ran annually until the last event in 2015. Between 2015 and 2016, Rewired State was run as a consultancy business by Emma Mulqueeny. The company was dissolved in 2018.
