= Rita Marcalo =

Portuguese dancer, choreographer and artistic director

Rita Marcalo is a Portuguese dancer, choreographer and artistic director of Instant Dissidence, a dance theatre company based in Leeds. In 2008 she was awarded a £13,889 grant for research into epilepsy, the culmination of which was the production of a live stage show in which she attempted to induce an epileptic seizure.

== Biography ==
Rita Marcalo has a BA (Hons) in dance (Human Kinetics College of Lisbon Technical University), an MA in choreography (1998, University of Surrey) and a PhD, and is a lecturer in dance at York St John University. She trained in dance at the professional school of the Lisbon Dance Company, and has since toured in Portugal, Spain, Belgium, the United States and the United Kingdom. She founded Instant Dissidence in 2002 after settling in the United Kingdom.

She has had epilepsy since the age of 17. When treated with medication, she has about 2 seizures per year.

== Involuntary Dances ==
Rita Marcalo received a grant from the Arts Council England to produce the stage show, entitled Involuntary Dances, in which she attempted to induce a seizure with the use of strobe lights, fasting, sleep deprivation and raising her body temperature. She stopped taking anticonvulsant medication during November 2009 in preparation for the show on 11 December. The show was scheduled to last for up to 24 hours, and members of the audience, who must be over 18, were encouraged to film using their camera phones, if a seizure occurred.

The planned show drew criticism from Epilepsy Action, with chief executive Philip Lee quoted as saying that many members would find the show "inappropriate", and voicing his concerns about the danger of stopping medication to induce a fit.

The Arts Council England defended their decision to give the grant for this show, explaining that "the grant supports an innovative and regional artist. Her project explores a disability issue and is a culmination of extensive research supported by the arts and science industries." The Arts Council also stated that they have ensured that a full risk assessment of the project is undertaken and that medical support is present during the performance.

Rita Marcalo herself stated that, while a fit is private in her own life, in art she can make it public. She was aiming to raise awareness of epilepsy by making it visible.
