= Alison Kervin =

British writer

Alison Cristine Kervin OBE is a British journalist and author. She is the sports editor of The Mail on Sunday newspaper. She is the first female in the UK to become sports editor of a major national newspaper.

== Fiction writing ==
Kervin has written a series of light-hearted novels centred on footballers' wives and girlfriends (known as WAGs): The WAG's Diary, A WAG Abroad and WAGs at the World Cup; followed by the tongue-in-cheek WAGs' Guide to Euro 2012. Her fourth novel, Celebrity Bride, a romantic comedy, was published in June 2009. Mother & Son, about the relationship between a single mother, her son, and the boy's father, was published in 2014.

== Sports writing ==
Kervin is now sports editor of The Mail on Sunday, she was formerly the chief sports feature writer of The Times newspaper, where she wrote a weekly interview – The Kervin Interview – for three years, then she became chief sports interviewer of The Daily Telegraph before going freelance. Recently she has worked as a consultant to Harper Collins Publishers, media trainer for UK Sport, and she was consultant editor on the Official Olympic Souvenir programme.

Kervin has written seven sport-related books, including Denise Lewis: Personal Best, Jason Leonard: The Autobiography, Sports Writing, The Unofficial Guide to the Rugby World Cup and Clive Woodward: The Biography, the autobiography of Phil Vickery and Thirty Bullies.

Kervin was appointed Officer of the Order of the British Empire (OBE) in the 2017 New Year Honours for services to sports journalism.

== Bibliography ==
=== Fiction ===
- The WAG's Diary (2007)
- A WAG Abroad (2008) – also published as WAGs Abroad and A WAG in L. A.
- WAGs at the World Cup (2010)
- WAGs' Guide to Euro 2012 (2012)
- Celebrity Bride (2009) – also published as Hollywood Bride
- Mother & Son (2014) – also published as Don't Take My Son

=== Non-fiction ===
- Sports Writing (August 1997)
- Rugby World Cup 1999 (August 1999)
- Denise Lewis: Personal Best (December 2001) – with Denise Lewis
- Jason Leonard: The Autobiography (November 2001) – also published as Jason Leonard: Full Time (April 2004) – with Jason Leonard
- Clive Woodward: The Biography (October 2005)
- Thirty Bullies: A History of the Rugby World Cup (September 2007)
- Raging Bull: My Autobiography (2010) – with Phil Vickery

In the 2017 New Year's Honours list she was made an Officer of the Order of the British Empire
