= WRFC =

WRFC may refer to:

== Football clubs ==
- Waterloo Rovers F.C., based in Welshpool, Wales
- Wellington Recreation F.C., based in County Antrim, Northern Ireland
- Welton Rovers F.C., based in Somerset, England
- Willand Rovers F.C., based in Devon, England

== Rugby union clubs ==
- Wainuiomata Rugby Football Club, based in Wellington, New Zealand
- Washington Rugby Football Club, based Washington DC, United States
- Waterloo R.F.C.
- Welwyn RFC
- Westcliff RFC
- Westoe RFC
- Williams Rugby Football Club, based in Massachusetts, United States
- Wimbledon RFC
- Winscombe R.F.C.
- Worcester Rugby Football Club, based in Worcester, England
- Worthing Rugby Football Club

== Broadcasting ==
- WRFC (AM), a radio station (960 AM) licensed to Athens, Georgia, United States
