= Markes E. Johnson =

American geologist and emeritus professor (born 1948)

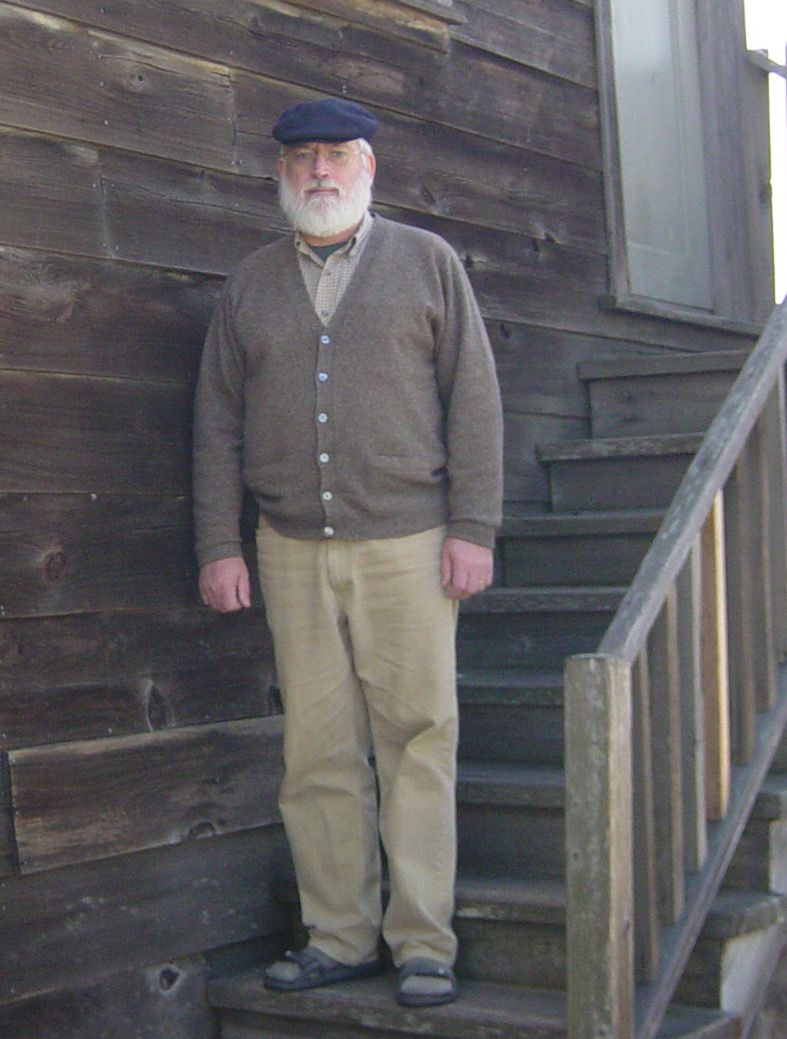
- Born: Markes Eric Johnson; December 30, 1948 (age 77)
- Education: University of Iowa; University of Chicago
- Known for: 2002 Discovering the Geology of Baja California; 1999 Inner Mongolia expedition
- Scientific career
- Fields: Geology
- Workplaces: Williams College

Markes Eric Johnson (born December 30, 1948) is an American geologist and emeritus professor at Williams College, known for his contributions to the study of ancient rocky shorelines, coastal ecosystems, and Silurian stratigraphy. His interdisciplinary research combines geology, paleoecology, and geomorphology to reconstruct ancient marine environments.

== Education ==
Johnson earned a Bachelor of Arts in geology from the University of Iowa in 1971. He completed his PhD in stratigraphy and paleoecology at the University of Chicago in 1977 under advisor Alfred M. Ziegler. His doctoral work laid the foundation for his lifelong interest in sea-level changes and coastal systems.

== Career and research ==
Johnson joined Williams College in 1977 as an assistant professor, and becoming full professor in 1989. He served as chair of the Geosciences Department from 1996 to 2000 and was appointed the Charles L. MacMillan Professor of Natural Science in 1994, a position he held until his retirement in 2012. Throughout his career, Johnson conducted fieldwork across six continents, supported by grants from the National Science Foundation, National Geographic Society, and the American Chemical Society’s Petroleum Research Fund.

Johnson has published in academic journals and books, contributing both scholarly research and public science communication. In 2023, he published Islands in Deep Time, which reflects on the geologic legacy of islands discovered across his career.

Johnson’s research on ancient rocky shorelines has enhanced understanding of intertidal ecosystems through geological time. His 2012 chapter, Development of Intertidal Biotas Through Phanerozoic Time, co-authored with B. Gudveig Baarli, reviews fossil assemblages from 361 global localities, documenting over 1,600 species from Cambrian to Pleistocene strata. The study distinguishes between rocky, muddy, and sandy shorelines, with 45% of sites representing ancient rocky shores, which exhibit the change.

Johnson's early research focused on Silurian sea-level changes, examining global stratigraphic patterns through studies in the U.S., Canada, Norway, Estonia, England, Australia, Siberia, and China.

From 1992 to 2000, he chaired the Subcommission on Silurian Stratigraphy under the International Union of Geological Sciences, leading global research efforts.

Since 1989, Johnson has conducted annual fieldwork in Baja California, Mexico, investigating coastal landscapes shaped by past climate and sea-level changes. His findings culminated in three books published by the University of Arizona Press: Discovering the Geology of Baja California (2002), Off-Trail Adventures in Baja California (2014), and Baja California’s Coastal Landscapes Revealed (2021), which combine scientific insights with travelogue reflections, often referencing Ed Ricketts and John Steinbeck's 1940 expedition.

In 1999, with support from the National Geographic Society, Johnson, Baarli, and Chinese paleontologist Rong Jia-yu discovered Bater Island in Inner Mongolia—a fossilized Silurian island with stromatoporoids and tabulate corals. This discovery was the first of its kind in China. During a 2003–2004 sabbatical, Johnson expanded his paleoisland research with fieldwork in the U.S., Australia, Japan, the Seychelles, and the Balearic Islands, furthering his studies on the evolution of island ecosystems.

== Publications ==
=== Books ===
- Johnson, Markes (October 3, 2024). Natural History and Natural Resources Through the Earth Sciences in Modern China After 1900 (1st ed.). Bradford: Ethics International Press Limited. ISBN 978-1-80441-815-4.
- Johnson, Markes E. (2023). Islands in deep time: ancient landscapes lost and found. New York: Columbia University Press. ISBN 978-0-231-21219-9.
- Johnson, Markes E. (2021). Baja California's coastal landscapes revealed: excursions in geologic time and climate change. Tucson: The University of Arizona Press. ISBN 978-0-8165-4252-9.
- Johnson, Markes E. (2014). Off-Trail Adventures in Baja California: Exploring Landscapes and Geology on Gulf Shores and Islands. Tucson: University of Arizona Press. ISBN 978-0-8165-2130-2.
- Johnson, Markes E.; Ledesma-Vázquez, Jorge, eds. (2009). Atlas of coastal ecosystems in the western Gulf of California: tracking limestone deposits on the margin of a young sea. Tucson: University of Arizona Press. ISBN 978-0-8165-2530-0. OCLC 317574191.
- Landing, Ed, ed. (2003). Silurian lands and seas: paleogeography outside of Laurentia. Bulletin / New York State Museum and Science Service. New York: New York State Museum. ISBN 978-1-55557-158-0.
- Johnson, Markes E. (2002-07-01). Discovering the Geology of Baja California. University of Arizona Press. doi:10.2307/j.ctv1t4m2dk. ISBN 978-0-8165-4635-0.
- Johnson, Markes E.; Ledesma-Vázquez, Jorge, eds. (1997). Pliocene carbonates and related facies flanking the Gulf of California, Baja California, Mexico. Special papers / the Geological Society of America. Boulder, Colo: Geological Society of America. ISBN 978-0-8137-2318-1.

=== Journals ===
- Johnson, Markes E.; Baarli, B. Gudveig (6 February 2023). "Spat fall and mature growth of large-shell brachiopods (Stricklandia lens lens) from the Solvik Formation (lower Silurian) at Sandvika in the Oslo Region of southern Norway". Norwegian Journal of Geology. doi:10.17850/njg103-1-5.
- E., Johnson, Markes (August 2024). "Ecology of Intertidal Rocky Shores Related to Examples of Coastal Geology across Phanerozoic Time". Journal of Marine Science and Engineering. 12 (8). doi:10.3390/jm (inactive 14 July 2025). ISSN 2077-1312.
- Johnson, Markes E.; Lin, Tsung-Yi; Su, Shew-Jiuan (16 May 2024). "Comparison of Coastal Geology and Subtropical Storms Impacting Taiwan and Mexico's Baja California Sur Around the Tropic of Cancer in the Pacific Basin". Journal of Coastal Research. 40 (5). doi:10.2112/JCOASTRES-D-24A-00002.1. ISSN 0749-0208.
