= Maud Mandel =

American historian

18th President of Williams College
- Incumbent
- Assumed office July 1, 2018
- Preceded by: Protik Majumder (acting)

Personal details
- Born: June 14, 1967 (age 59)
- Relatives: Ruth Mandel (mother)
- Education: Oberlin College (BA); University of Michigan (MA, PhD)

Academic work
- Discipline: Judaic studies
- Sub-discipline: French history Jewish history Islamic-Jewish relations
- Institutions: Brown University; Williams College

Maud S. Mandel (born June 14, 1967) is an American historian and academic administrator. She is the 18th and current president of Williams College, the first woman in the position. Mandel was previously a professor of history and Judaic studies and Dean of the College at Brown University. She specialises in twentieth-century French history, with a particular focus on the interaction of Muslim, Jewish, and Armenian communities in France.

== Early life and education ==
Mandel's mother, Ruth, was the director of the Eagleton Institute of Politics at Rutgers University. She earned her B.A. in English from Oberlin College in 1989. In 1993, she graduated from the University of Michigan, with a M.A., followed by a Ph.D. in modern Jewish history in 1998 from the same institution.

== Brown University ==
=== Professorship ===
In 1997, she joined the Brown faculty as a visiting assistant professor in the History department.

Mandel's scholarship focuses on ethnic and religious minorities in twentieth-century France. She has written about immigration, nationalism, integration, and inter-ethnic relations. Mandel has particularly emphasized the Muslim, Jewish, and Armenian communities in France and has investigated how these groups interact with each other and with broader society.

Mandel became a full member of the faculty in 2001, served as chair of the Judaic studies program from 2012-2014, and was named a full professor in 2014.

=== Administration Leadership ===
In June 2014, Mandel was named Dean of the College. In this role, she prioritized Brown's advising programs and the development of skills through the undergraduate curriculum. Specific projects led by Mandel include establishment of the Brown Learning Collaborative that stresses liberal arts competencies teaching "through a peer-to-peer approach," 1stY@Brown online coursework that prepares incoming students for undergraduate curriculum rigors, and overseeing the opening of the First-Generation College and Low-Income Student Center.

== Williams College ==
On March 11, 2018, Mandel was selected to be the 18th president of Williams College. Mandel assumed the position on July 1, 2018.

== Selected publications ==
- In the Aftermath of Genocide: Armenians and Jews in Twentieth Century France. Durham, NC: Duke University Press, 2003. ISBN 0822331217.
- Muslims and Jews in France: History of a Conflict. Princeton, NJ: Princeton University Press, 2014. ISBN 9781400848584.
- Colonialism and the Jews. Edited by Ethan Katz, Lisa Moses Leff, and Maud Mandel. Bloomington, IN: Indiana University Press, 2017. ISBN 9780253024626.

== See also ==
- List of Williams College presidents
