= Adam Falk =

American physicist (born 1965)

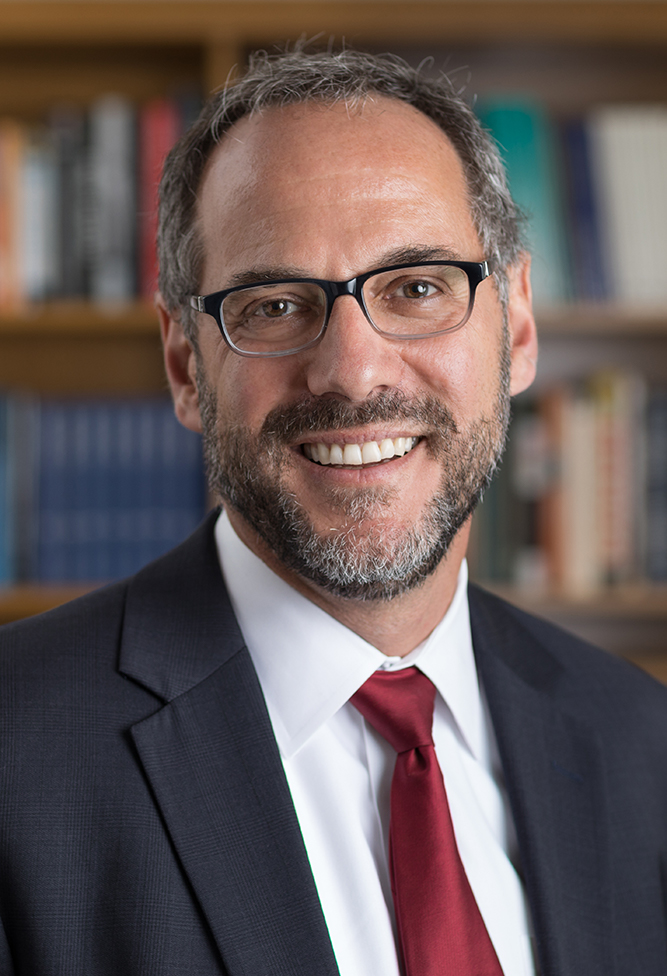

President of Alfred P. Sloan Foundation
- Incumbent
- Assumed office July 1, 2018
- Preceded by: Paul Joskow

President of Williams College
- In office April 1, 2010 – December 2017
- Preceded by: William G. Wagner (acting)
- Succeeded by: Protik Majumder (acting)

Personal details
- Born: April 19, 1965 (age 61)
- Education: University of North Carolina, Chapel Hill (BS); Harvard University (MS, PhD)

Adam Frederick Falk (born April 19, 1965) is an American physicist who has been president of the Alfred P. Sloan Foundation since 2018. He was previously the president of Williams College from 2010 to 2017 and formerly the dean of the Zanvyl Krieger School of Arts and Sciences at Johns Hopkins University, where he was also a professor of physics.

== Early life and education ==
Falk is a native of Chapel Hill, North Carolina. He graduated from the North Carolina School of Science and Mathematics after attending Durham Academy. He received a B.S. from the University of North Carolina at Chapel Hill in 1987, where he was a Morehead-Cain Scholar. He received a Ph.D. in physics from Harvard University in 1991.

== Career ==
Falk began his career as a post-doctoral researcher working first at the Stanford Linear Accelerator Center and then at the University of California, San Diego. In 1994, he joined the physics faculty at Johns Hopkins University, becoming a full professor in 2000.

In 2006, Falk became the James B. Knapp Dean at the Zanvyl Krieger School of Arts and Sciences at Johns Hopkins University.

From 2010 to 2017, Falk served as the 17th President of Williams College.

From the beginning of 2018 until June, 2025 Falk served as president of the Alfred P. Sloan Foundation. As of July, 2025, he is the president and CEO of the Wildlife Conservation Society.

== Research ==
Falk is a high-energy physicist whose research focused on elementary particle physics and quantum field theory, particularly in interactions and decay of meson and baryons containing heavy quarks. He is the author of more than 50 peer-reviewed papers on these and related topics.

== Honors and awards ==
- Fellow of the American Physical Society, 2002
- Johns Hopkins Alumni Association Excellence in Teaching Award
- Young Investigator Award, NSF
- Sloan Research Fellowship
- Morehead-Cain Scholar, University of North Carolina
