= Williams College =

Private college in Massachusetts, US

- Latin: Collegium Guilielmense
- Motto: E liberalitate E. Williams, armigeri (Latin)
- Motto in English: "Through the Generosity of E. Williams, Esquire"
- Type: Private liberal arts college
- Established: 1793; 233 years ago
- Accreditation: NECHE
- Academic affiliations: Annapolis Group; CLAC; COFHE; Oberlin Group; Space-grant
- Endowment: $3.93 billion (2025)
- President: Maud Mandel
- Provost: Eiko Maruko Siniawer
- Faculty: 356 (fall 2024)
- Students: 2,150 (fall 2024)
- Undergraduates: 2,101 (fall 2024)
- Postgraduates: 49 (fall 2024)
- Location: Williamstown, Massachusetts, United States; 42°42′45″N 73°12′18″W
- Campus: Rural, college town, 450 acres (180 ha)
- Colors: Purple & gold
- Nickname: Ephs
- Sporting affiliations: NCAA Division III – NESCAC; NEISA; EISA
- Mascots: Ephelia, the Purple Cow
- Website: www.williams.edu

Williams College is a private liberal arts college in Williamstown, Massachusetts, United States. It was established as a men's college in 1793 with funds from the estate of Ephraim Williams, a colonist from the Province of Massachusetts Bay who was killed in the French and Indian War in 1755.

Williams's main campus is located in Williamstown, in the Berkshires in rural northwestern Massachusetts, and contains more than 100 academic, athletic, and residential buildings. There are 360 voting faculty members, with a student-to-faculty ratio of 6:1. As of 2025, the college had an enrollment of 2,101 undergraduate students and 49 graduate students.

Following a liberal arts curriculum, Williams College provides undergraduate instruction in 25 academic departments and interdisciplinary programs including 36 majors in the humanities, arts, social sciences, and natural sciences. Williams offers an almost entirely undergraduate instruction, though there are two graduate programs in development economics and art history. The college maintains affiliations with the nearby Clark Art Institute and the Massachusetts Museum of Contemporary Art (MASS MoCA) along with a close relationship with Exeter College, Oxford. The college competes as the Ephs in the NCAA Division III as a member of the New England Small College Athletic Conference.

== History ==
Colonel Ephraim Williams was an officer in the Massachusetts militia and a member of a prominent landowning family. Williams was killed at the Battle of Lake George on September 8, 1755. His will included a bequest to support and maintain a free school to be established in the town of West Hoosac, Massachusetts, provided the town change its name to Williamstown.

Members of the Williams family first attempted to found Queens College in Hatfield, Massachusetts, in 1762. The charter was revoked within a year when Massachusetts governor Francis Bernard succumbed to pressure from Harvard College, which opposed the creation of a second institution of higher learning in the colonial-era Province of Massachusetts Bay.

In 1765, the west township was incorporated as Williamstown. Five years later, the town's proprietors brought the executors of Williams' estate before the General Court to dispute the delay in establishment of the free school, and in 1795, the Massachusetts legislature finally granted the school its charter.

The Williamstown Free School opened with 15 students on October 26, 1791. The first president was Ebenezer Fitch. Not long after its founding, the school's trustees petitioned the Massachusetts legislature to convert the free school to a tuition-based college. The legislature agreed and on June 22, 1793, Williams College was chartered. It was the second college to be founded in Massachusetts.

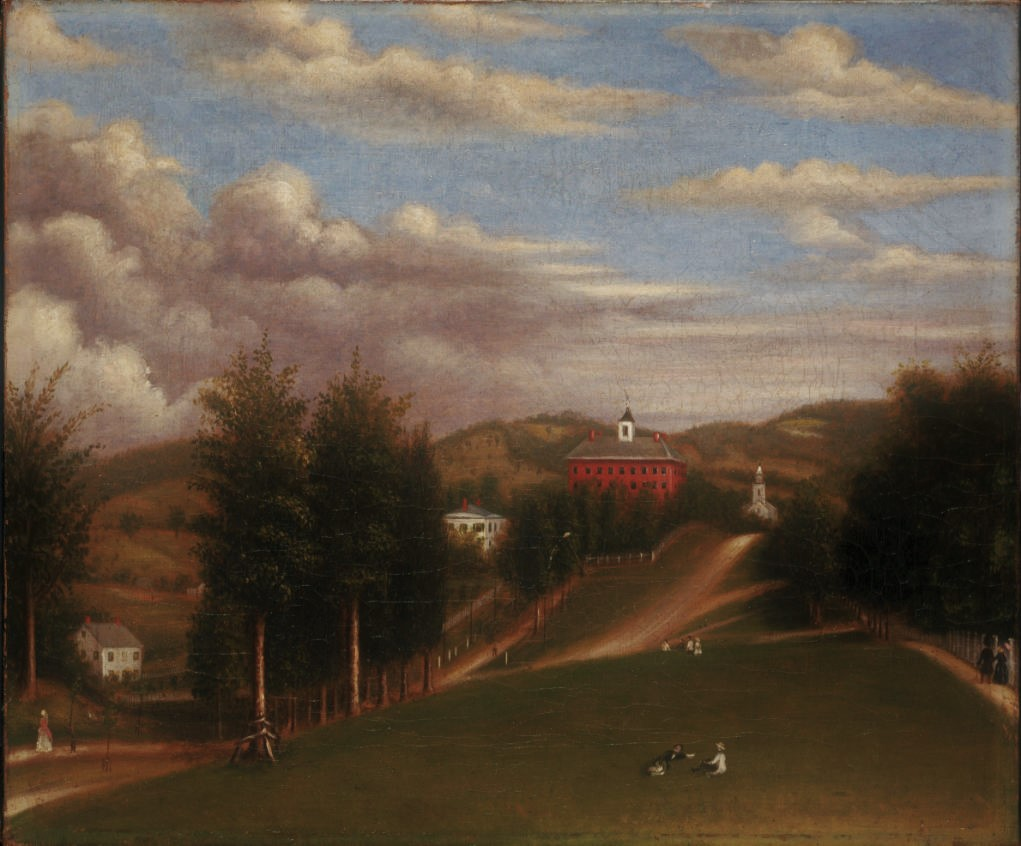
Depiction of West College, which composed the entire college in its early years.

At its founding, the college maintained a policy of racial segregation, refusing admission to black applicants. This policy was challenged by Lucy Terry Prince, who is credited as the first black American poet, when her son Festus was refused admission on account of his race. Prince, who had established a reputation as a raconteur and rhetorician, delivered a three-hour speech before the college's board of trustees, quoting abundantly from scripture, but was unable to secure her son's admission. Later scholarship questions whether these events occurred as Festus Prince may have been refused entry for an insufficient mastery of Latin, Greek, and French, all of which were necessary for successful completion of the entrance exam at the time, and which would most likely not have been available in the local schools of Guilford, Vermont, where Festus was raised.

In 1806, a student prayer meeting gave rise to the American Foreign Mission Movement. In August of that year, five students met in the maple grove of Sloan's Meadow to pray. A thunderstorm drove them to the shelter of a haystack, and the fervor of the ensuing meeting inspired them to take the Gospel abroad. The students went on to build the American Board of Commissioners for Foreign Missions, the first American organization to send missionaries overseas. The Haystack Monument near Mission Park on the Williams Campus commemorates the historic "Haystack Prayer Meeting".

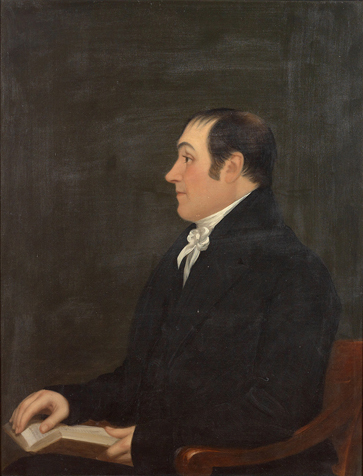
Zephaniah Swift Moore, the second president of the college and first president of Amherst College

By 1815, Williams had only two buildings and 58 students and was in financial trouble, so the board voted to move the college to Amherst, Massachusetts. In 1821, the president of the college, Zephaniah Swift Moore, who had accepted his position believing the college would move east, decided to proceed with the move. He took 15 students with him, and re-founded the college under the name of Amherst College. Some students and professors decided to stay at Williams and were allowed to keep the land, which was at the time relatively worthless. Moore died just two years later after founding Amherst, and was succeeded by Heman Humphrey, a trustee of Williams College.

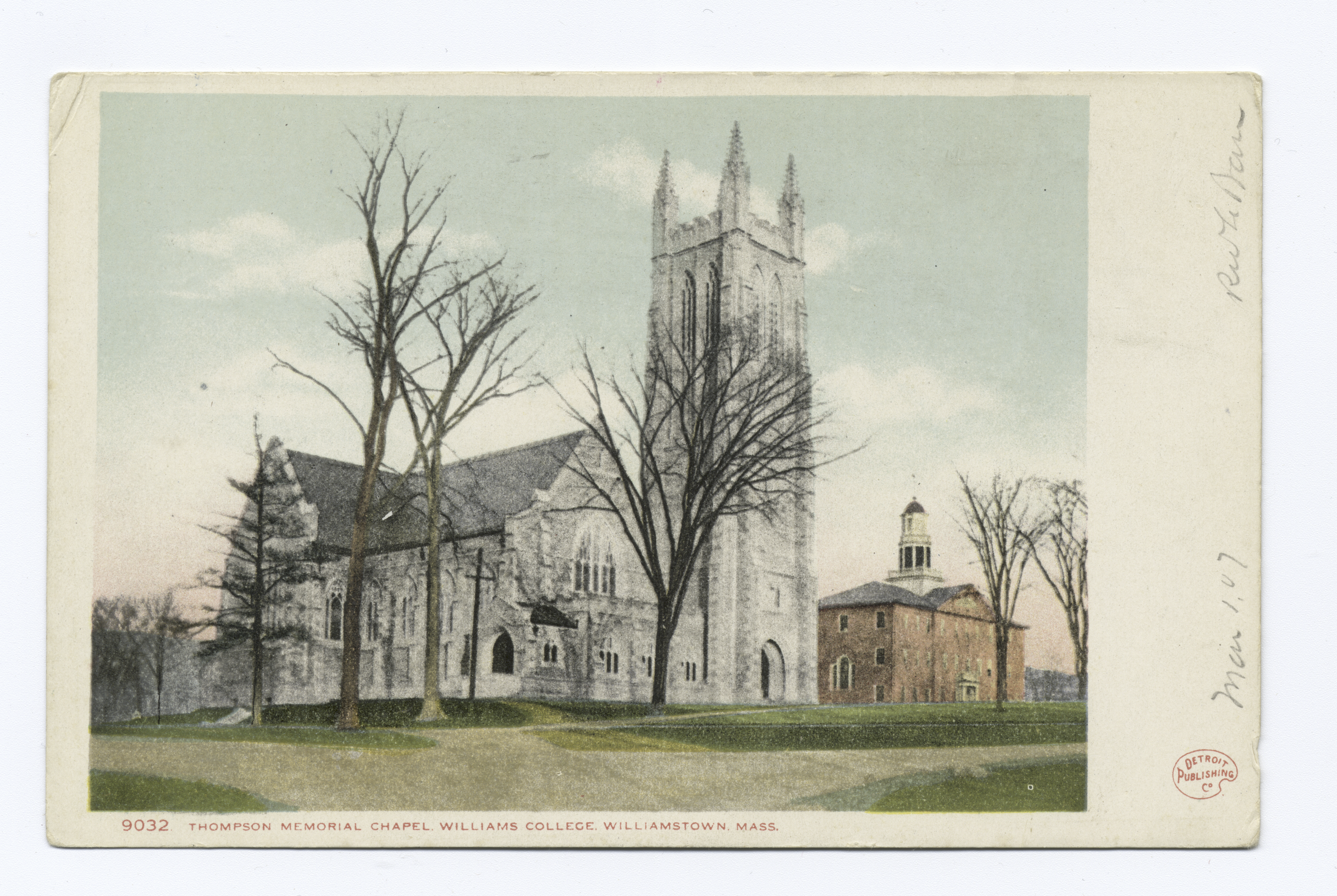
Thompson Memorial Church, early 20th century

Edward Dorr Griffin was appointed President of Williams and is widely credited with saving Williams during his 15-year tenure. A Williams student, Gardner Cotrell Leonard, of Albany, New York, whose family owned the city's Cotrell & Leonard department store, designed the gowns he and his classmates wore to graduation in 1887. Seven years later he advised the Inter-Collegiate Commission on Academic Costume, which met at Columbia University, and established the current system of U.S. academic dress. One reason gowns were adopted in the late 19th century was to eliminate the differences in apparel between rich and poor students. Gardner Cotrell Leonard went on to edit the book The Songs of Williams, a collection of songs sung at the college. During World War II, Williams College was one of 131 colleges and universities nationally that took part in the V-12 Navy College Training Program which offered students a path to a Navy commission.

Following a liberal arts curriculum, Williams College provides undergraduate instruction in 25 academic departments and interdisciplinary programs including 36 majors in the humanities, arts, social sciences, and natural sciences. Williams offers an almost entirely undergraduate instruction, though there are two graduate programs in development economics and art history. The college maintains affiliations with the nearby Clark Art Institute and Massachusetts Museum of Contemporary Art (MASS MoCA), and has a close relationship with Exeter College, Oxford University, where the school runs a year-long study abroad program for juniors. The college competes as the Ephs in the NCAA Division III as a member of the New England Small College Athletic Conference. Their athletic program has been highly successful, winning 22 of 29 College Directors' Cups for NCAA Division III.

Williams is a highly selective school with an acceptance rate of 8% for the Class of 2025. It has ranked first in U.S. News & World Report's rankings of National Liberal Arts Colleges every year since 2004. In April 2022, Williams transitioned to an all grants system for financial aid, one of the few institutions of higher learning in the United States to do so.

=== Coeducation ===
Though Williams College officially began the process of coeducation in the late 1960s, women integrated the college as early as the 1930s. Beatrice Irene Wasserscheid (née Acly) was the first woman to be awarded a Williams degree after successfully petitioning the trustees to pursue a master of arts degree in American literature. She received her master's degree in June 1931. That same decade, in 1935, Emily Cleland became the first woman to teach at Williams when she finished teaching her late husband's geology course after he died in an accident. The first tenured woman faculty member at the college, Doris DeKeyselingk, oversaw the Russian department beginning in 1958.

During his time as president of Williams College, John E. Sawyer officially initiated the process of coeducation among the undergraduates. After overseeing the abolition of fraternities in 1962 after a student petition, Sawyer created a faculty-trustee committee, the Committee on Coordinate Education and Related Questions, in 1967 to explore options for coeducation and co-ordinate education. In response to the Committee on Coordinate Education's final report, the trustees voted in June 1969 to regularly admit women undergraduate students in fall 1971. The college welcomed 137 women as first-year students in fall 1971. They were joined by 90 transfer and exchange students from women's colleges who, during their junior and senior year, participated in the Ten College Exchange Program which Sawyer helped to establish in the mid-to-late 1960s. The graduating class of 1975 was the first fully co-educational class to graduate from Williams.

The college's admission of women undergraduate students coincided with the diversification of faculty and staff. An affirmative action program, launched in 1972 by President John Chandler, reinforced equal opportunity employment. In addition to facilitating the hiring and retention of African-American staff and faculty, the program prioritized hiring women. As a result of the efforts of the dean of faculty and the provost in collaboration with "Committee W", a women-led group dedicated to fulfilling the program's mission, the number of women faculty steadily rose. From the inception of Williams's affirmative action program in 1972 to its revision in 1975, the proportion of women full-time faculty increased from 4.5% to 11.7%. By 1975, 34% of the first-term assistant professors were women.

Throughout the 1970s, Williams College experienced an increase of women in high administrative and advisory positions as well. In February 1970, the college hired its first female dean, Nancy McIntire. In October 1971, at age 29, Gail Walker Haslett was elected as a three-year term trustee on the Williams College Board of Trustees. She was the first woman to ever serve on the board. In 1976, Pamela G. Carlton '76 became the first woman alumni trustee and Janet Brown '73, the first woman graduate of Williams to serve on the executive committee of the Society of Alumni.

As of 2021, 45.6% of full-time faculty and 51.6% of the undergraduate class are women-identifying at Williams. In July 2018, Maud Mandel began her tenure as the 18th and current president of Williams College. She is the first woman to assume this role.

=== Construction and expansion ===
In the last decade, construction has changed the look of the college. The addition of the $38 million Unified Science Center to the campus in 2001 set a tone of style and comprehensiveness for renovations and additions to campus buildings in the 21st century. This building unifies the formerly separate lab spaces of the physics, chemistry, and biology departments. In addition, it houses Schow Science Library, notable for its unified science materials holdings and architecture. It features vaulted ceilings and an atrium with windows into laboratories on the second through fourth floors of the science center.

In 2003, Williams began the first of three massive construction projects. The $60 million '62 Center for Theatre and Dance was the first project to be successfully completed in the spring of 2005. The $44 million student center, called Paresky Center, opened in February 2007.

Construction had already begun on the third project, called the Stetson-Sawyer project, when it was delayed due to the 2008 financial crisis. College trustees initially balked at the Stetson-Sawyer project's cost, and revisited the idea of renovating Sawyer in its current location, an idea which proved not to be cost effective. The entire project includes construction of two new academic buildings, the removal of Sawyer Library from its current location, and the construction of a new library at the rear of a renovated Stetson Hall (which served as the college library prior to Sawyer's construction). The academic buildings, temporarily named North Academic Building and South Academic Building, were completed in fall 2008. In the spring of 2009, South Academic Building was renamed Schapiro Hall in honor of former president Morton O. Schapiro. In spring 2010 the North Academic Building was renamed Hollander Hall. Construction of the new Sawyer Library was completed in 2014, after which the old Sawyer Library was razed.

After several years of planning, the college decided to group undergraduates starting with the Class of 2010 into four geographically coherent clusters, or "Neighborhoods". Since the fall of 2006, first-years have been housed in Sage Hall, Williams Hall and Mission Park, while the former first-year dormitories East College, Lehman Hall, Fayerweather, and Morgan, joined the remaining residential buildings as upperclass housing. During the spring 2009 semester, a committee formed to evaluate the neighborhood system, and released a report the following fall. From 2003 through 2008, Williams conducted a capital campaign with the goal of raising $400 million by September 2008. The college reached $400 million at the end of June 2007. By the close of the campaign, Williams had raised $500.2 million.

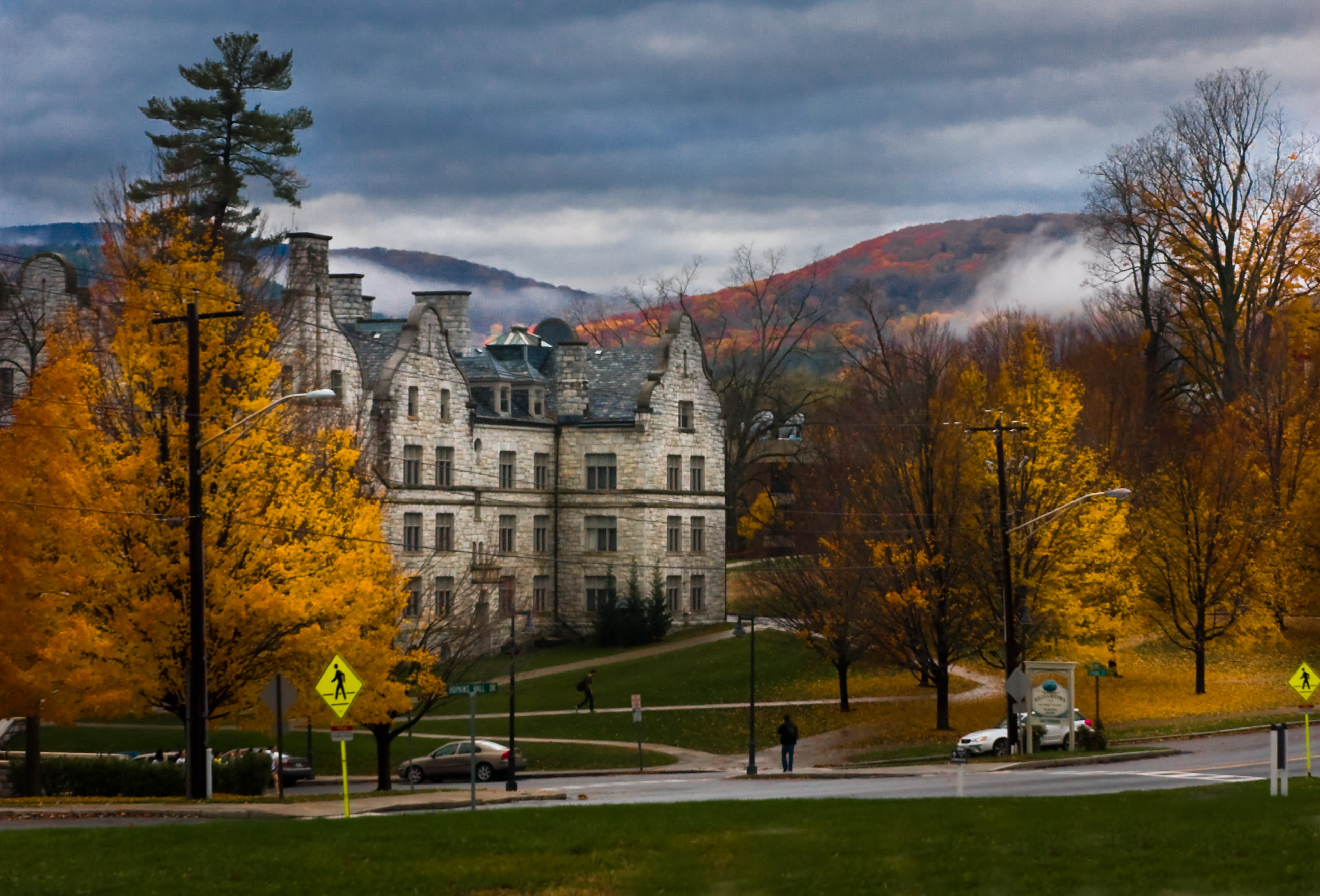
The college's Morgan Hall

As of the 2008–09 school year, the college eliminated student loans from all financial aid packages in favor of grants. The college was the fourth institution in the United States to do so, following Princeton University, Amherst College, and Davidson College. However, in February 2010, the college announced it would re-introduce loans to its financial aid packages beginning with the Class of 2015 due to the college's changed financial situation. In January 2007 the board voted unanimously to reduce college CO_{2} emissions 10% below 1990 levels by 2020, or roughly 50% below 2006 levels. To meet those goals, the college set up the Zilkha Center for Environmental Initiatives and has undertaken an energy audit and efficiency timeline. Williams received an 'A−' on the 2010 College Sustainability Report Card, following 'B+' grades on both the 2008 and 2009 report cards. In December 2008, President Morton O. Schapiro announced his departure from the college to become president of Northwestern University.

On September 28, 2009, the presidential search committee announced the appointment of Adam Falk as the 17th president of Williams College. Falk, dean of the Zanvyl Krieger School of Arts and Sciences at Johns Hopkins University, began his term on April 1, 2010. Dean of the Faculty William G. Wagner took the position of interim president beginning in June 2009, and continued in that capacity until President-elect Falk took office. In 2014, Williams College brought their endowment above the 2 billion dollar mark. On March 11, 2018, former dean of the college at Brown University Maud Mandel was selected to be the 18th president of Williams College. Mandel assumed the role on July 1, 2018.

== Campus ==
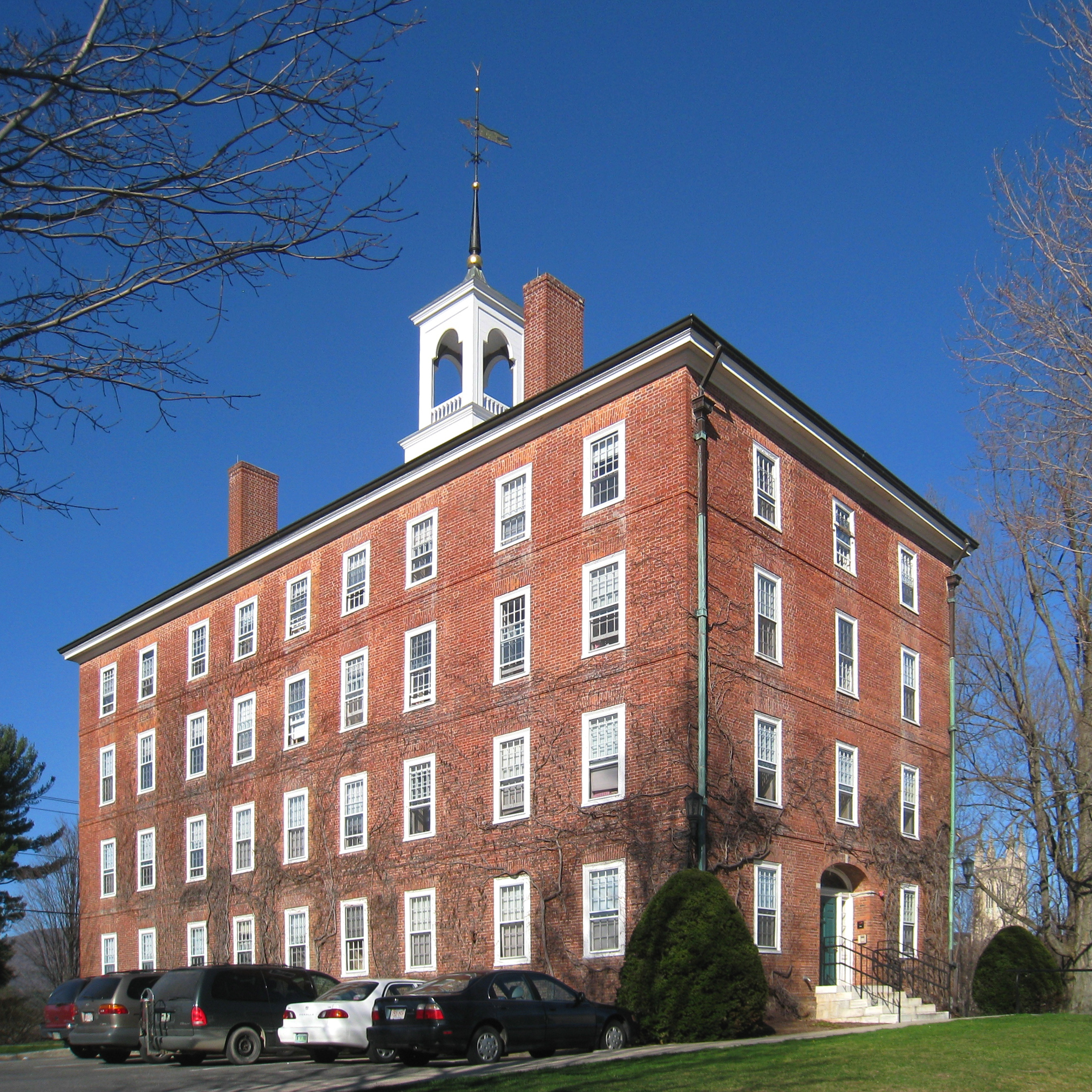
West College, the oldest building of Williams's campus.

Williams is located on a 450-acre (180-hectare) campus in Williamstown, Massachusetts, in the Berkshires in rural northwestern Massachusetts. The campus contains more than 100 academic, athletic, and residential buildings.

The early planners of Williams College eschewed the traditional collegiate quadrangle organization, choosing to freely site buildings among the hills. Later construction, including East and West Colleges and Griffin Hall, tended to cluster around Main Street in Williamstown. The first campus quadrangle was formed with East College, South College, and the Hopkins Observatory.

The Olmsted Brothers design firm played a large part in shaping the campus design and architecture. In 1902, the firm was commissioned to renovate a large part of campus, including the President's House, the cemetery, and South College; as well as incorporating the George A. Cluett estate into the campus acreage. Although these campus renovations were completed in 1912, the Olmsted Brothers would advise the gradual transformation of campus design for six decades. The present-day grounds layout reflects much of the design intent of the Olmsted Brothers.

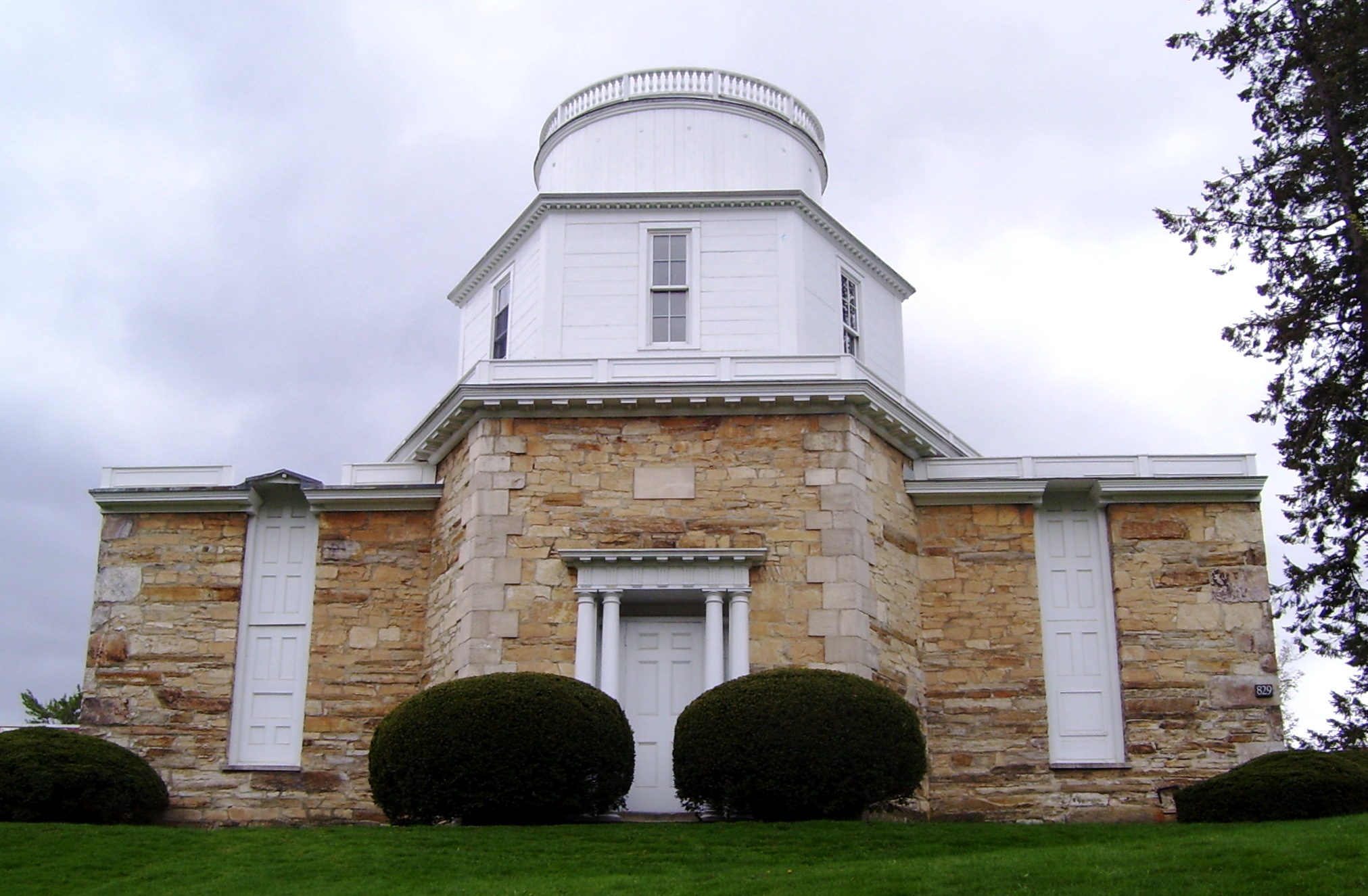
Old Hopkins Observatory

Williams College is the site of the Hopkins Observatory, the oldest extant astronomical observatory in the United States. Erected in 1836–1838, it now contains the Mehlin Museum of Astronomy, including Alvan Clark's first telescope (from 1852), as well as the Milham Planetarium, which uses a Zeiss Skymaster ZKP3/B optomechanical projector and an Ansible digital projector, both installed in 2005. The Hopkins Observatory's 0.6-m DFM reflecting telescope (1991) is installed elsewhere on the campus. Williams joins with Wellesley, Wesleyan, Middlebury, Colgate, Vassar, Swarthmore, and Haverford/Bryn Mawr to form the Keck Northeast Astronomy Consortium, sponsored for over a decade by the Keck Foundation and now with its student research programs sponsored by the National Science Foundation. Hopkins Hall serves as the administration building on campus, housing the offices of the president, Dean of the Faculty, registrar, and provost, among others. There is a Newman Center on campus.

The Chapin Library supports the liberal arts curriculum of the college by allowing students close access to a number of rare books and documents of interest. The library opened on June 18, 1923, with an initial collection of 9,000 volumes contributed by alumnus Alfred Clark Chapin, Class of 1869. Over the years, Chapin Library has grown to include over 50,000 volumes (including 3,000 more given by Chapin) as well as 100,000 other artifacts such as prints, photographs, maps, and bookplates. The library is currently located on the fourth floor of the recently reopened Sawyer Library.

The Chapin Library's Americana collection includes original printings of all four founding documents of the United States: the Declaration of Independence, the Articles of Confederation, the Constitution, and the Bill of Rights. Additionally it houses George Washington's copy of The Federalist and the British reply to the Declaration of Independence.

The Chapin Library's science collection includes a first edition of Nicolaus Copernicus's De revolutionibus orbium coelestium, as well as first editions of books by Tycho Brahe, Johannes Kepler, Galileo, Isaac Newton, and other major figures.

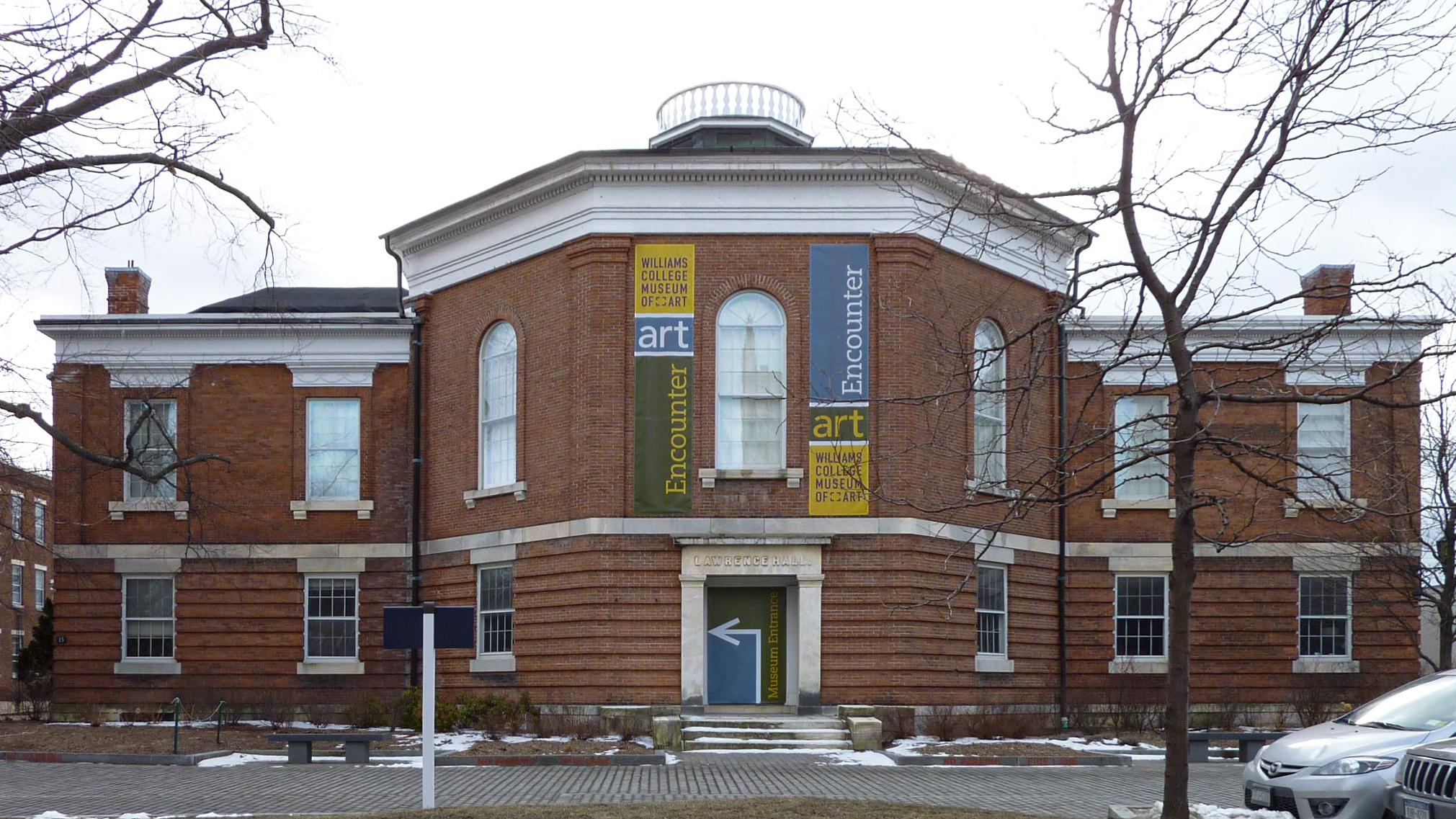
Lawrence Hall, home of the Williams College Museum of Art

The Williams College Museum of Art (WCMA), with over 12,000 works (only a fraction of which are displayed at any one time) in its permanent collection, serves as an educational resource for both undergraduates and students in the graduate art history program. A new 76,800 sf building is scheduled to open in 2027 and be constructed using mass timber. Renderings by SO – IL show a nebulous, low-lying structure with an aluminum shingle roof that ebbs-and-flows across the pastoral landscape, mimicking the nearby Berkshire Mountains.

Notable works include Morning in a City by Edward Hopper, a commissioned wall painting by Sol LeWitt, and a commissioned outdoor sculpture and landscape work by Louise Bourgeois entitled Eyes. Because the museum is intended primarily for educational purposes, admission is free for all students.

Located in front of the West College dormitory, the Hopkins gate serves as a memorial to brothers Mark and Albert Hopkins. Both made lasting contributions to the Williams College community. Mark was appointed as president of the college in 1836, while Albert was elected a professor in 1829.

== Organization and administration ==
The board of trustees of Williams College has 25 members and is the governing authority of the college. The president of the college serves on the board ex officio. There are five alumni trustees, each of whom serves for a five-year term. There are five term trustees, each elected by the board for five-year terms. The remaining 14 members are regular trustees, also elected by the board but serving up to 15 years, although not beyond their seventieth birthday. The current chair of the board of trustees is Liz Robinson.

The board appoints as senior executive officer of the college a president who is also a member of and the presiding officer of the faculty. Nine senior administrators report to the president, including the dean of the faculty, provost, and dean of the college. Adam F. Falk is the 17th president of Williams, and took office on April 1, 2010.

College Council (CC) was the student government of Williams College until 2020, when the student body voted to replace it with the Three Pillars plan: student-faculty committees, Williams Student Union (WSU), and Facilitators for Allocating Student Taxes (FAST). The WSU consists of 12 members (three representatives per class year) who are elected by their classes and serve semester terms. FAST members are responsible for managing the student activity tax and are in charge of distributing funds to registered student organizations (RSOs).

To manage its endowment, the college started the Williams College Investment Office in 2006. In 2020, the endowment-per-student ratio reached $1.40 million unadjusted for inflation, while in 1990, it was $151,000. Adjusting for inflation, the endowment-per-student ratio had still increased to almost $600,000. In 2021, Williams' endowment-per-student ratio was one of nine colleges or universities to exceed $2 million along with Princeton, Yale, MIT, Stanford, Harvard, Amherst, Pomona, and Swarthmore.

=== Presidents ===
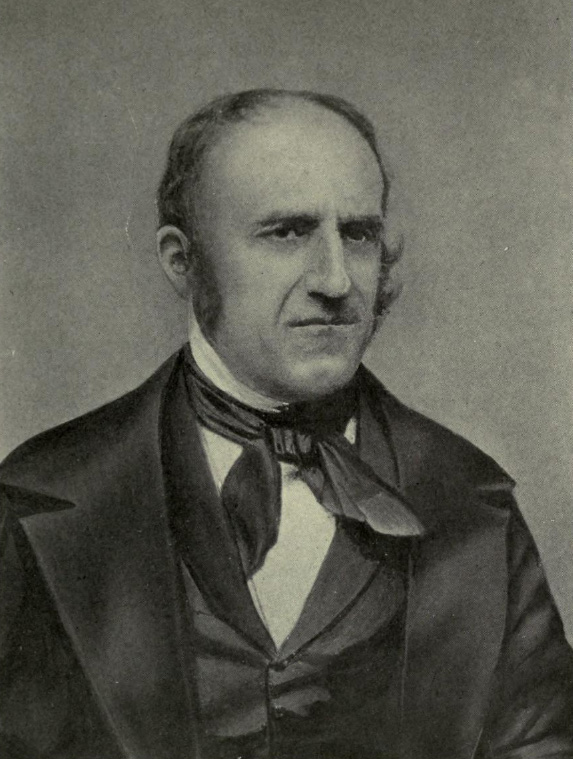
Mark Hopkins was the fourth and longest-serving president of Williams College.

The Office of the President is located in Hopkins Hall, named after Mark Hopkins, Williams's fourth president, and the president of the college lives in the Samuel Sloan House, erected in 1801. Before moving into the Samuel Sloan House, the president originally lived in a nearby house where Hopkins Hall now stands. The house has been renovated multiple times since originally being built, including over $500,000 in renovations in 2000 and 2001.

Since its creation in 1793, Williams College has had 17 full-time presidents and two interim presidents. The 18th president and current president is Maud Mandel, who began her tenure on July 1, 2018.

The following persons served as president of Williams College:

No.	Image	President	Term begin	Term end	Ref.
1		Ebenezer Fitch	1793	1815	
2		Zephaniah Swift Moore	1815	1821	
3		Edward Dorr Griffin	1821	1836	
4		Mark Hopkins	1836	1872	
5		Paul Ansel Chadbourne	1872	1881	
6		Franklin Carter	1881	1901	
Acting		John Haskell Hewitt	1901	1902	
7		Henry Hopkins	1902	1908	
8		Harry Augustus Garfield	1908	1934	
9		Tyler Dennett	1934	1937	
10		James Phinney Baxter III	1937	1961	
11		John Edward Sawyer	1961	1973	
12		John Wesley Chandler	July 1, 1973	1985	
13		Francis Christopher Oakley	1985	1993	
14		Harry Charles Payne	January 1, 1994	1999	
15		Carl W. Vogt	1999	2000	
16		Morton Owen Schapiro	July 1, 2000	June 30, 2009 (Note: Resigned to head Northwestern University)	
Interim		William G. Wagner	July 1, 2009	March 31, 2010	
17		Adam Falk	April 1, 2010	December 31, 2017 (Note: Resigned to head Alfred P. Sloan Foundation.)	
Interim		Protik Majumder	January 1, 2017	June 30, 2018	
18		Maud Mandel	July 1, 2018	present	

Table notes:

== Academics ==
Williams is a small, four-year liberal arts college accredited by the New England Commission of Higher Education. There are three academic curricular divisions (humanities, sciences, and social sciences), 26 departments, 37 majors, and two small master's degree programs in art history and development economics. Students may also concentrate in 12 additional academic areas that are not offered as majors (e.g., cognitive science). The academic year follows a 4–1–4 schedule of two four-course semesters plus a one-course "winter study" term in January. During the winter study term, students study one of various courses outside of typical curriculum for 3 weeks. Students typically take this course on a pass/fail basis. Past course offerings have included: Ski Patrol, Learn to Play Chess, Accounting, Inside Jury Deliberations, and Creating a Life: Shaping Your Life After Williams, among many others. Williams students often take the winter study term to study abroad or work on intensive research projects.

Williams' most popular undergraduate majors, based on the average of 2022-2025 graduates, were:

1. Economics (114)
2. Mathematics (62)
3. Psychology (62)
4. Computer Science (59)
5. Biology (52)
6. English (51)
7. History (50)
8. Political Science (47)
9. Art (38)
10. Chemistry (30)

The college's 2025–26 Comprehensive Fee was $90,750, including tuition ($72,170) and board, room, and fees ($18,580). 48% of students were given need-based financial aid, which averaged $63,516.

Williams sponsors the Williams–Mystic program at Mystic Seaport; the Williams–Exeter Programme at Exeter College of Oxford University. Williams has a close relationship with Exeter College, a constituent college of Oxford University. In the early 1980s, Williams purchased a group of houses, today known as the Ephraim Williams House, on Banbury Road and Lathbury Road, in North Oxford.

The Williams-Exeter Programme at Oxford (WEPO) was founded in 1985. Every year (except 2010–2011 and 2022–2023), 26 undergraduate students from Williams spend their junior year at Exeter as full members of the college.

=== Admissions ===
Admissions statistics
- 2024 entering class
- Admit rate: 8.3% (▼ −4.3)
- Yield rate: 43% (▼ −1)

Test scores middle 50%^{[i]}
- SAT Total: 1500–1560 (▲ +35 median)
- SAT EBRW: 740–780 (▲ +20 median)
- SAT Math: 750–790 (▲ +15 median)
- ACT Composite: 34–35 ( same median)

High school GPA^{[ii]}
- Top 10%: 88.4% (▲ +3.4)
- Top 25%: 98.2% ( +0.2)
- Top 50%: 99.1% ( +0.1)

Williams is classified as "most selective" by U.S. News & World Report and "more selective" by the Carnegie Foundation for the Advancement of Teaching.

For freshmen students admitted in Fall 2024 (Class of 2028), the average redesigned SAT was 1500–1560. The average super-scored ACT Composite score was 34–35.

The college is need-blind for domestic applicants.

=== Reputation and rankings ===
Academic rankings

Liberal arts
- U.S. News & World Report: 1
- Washington Monthly: 2

National
- Forbes: 7
- WSJ/College Pulse: 108

In the 2010, 2011, and 2014 Forbes college rankings, Williams was ranked the No. 1 undergraduate institution in the United States. Williams was the first school to achieve three first place Forbes rankings, while placing second in 2012, 2015, and 2016. Annual rankings following 2017 would see Williams fall out of the top ten to as low as 19th in 2019. Williams ranked 18th after Forbes changed their ranking methodology to emphasize alumni salaries and graduation debt in 2021. In the Forbes 2022 College Rankings, Williams College rose to 7th. In their 2024 ranking, the college fell again, to 17th.

Williams has been ranked first in U.S. News & World Report's rankings of Best National Liberal Arts Colleges every year since 2004, and has been in the top three every year since the rankings were created in 1984. (This list does not include research universities: unlike Forbes, U.S. News & World Report ranks universities and liberal arts colleges on separate lists.)

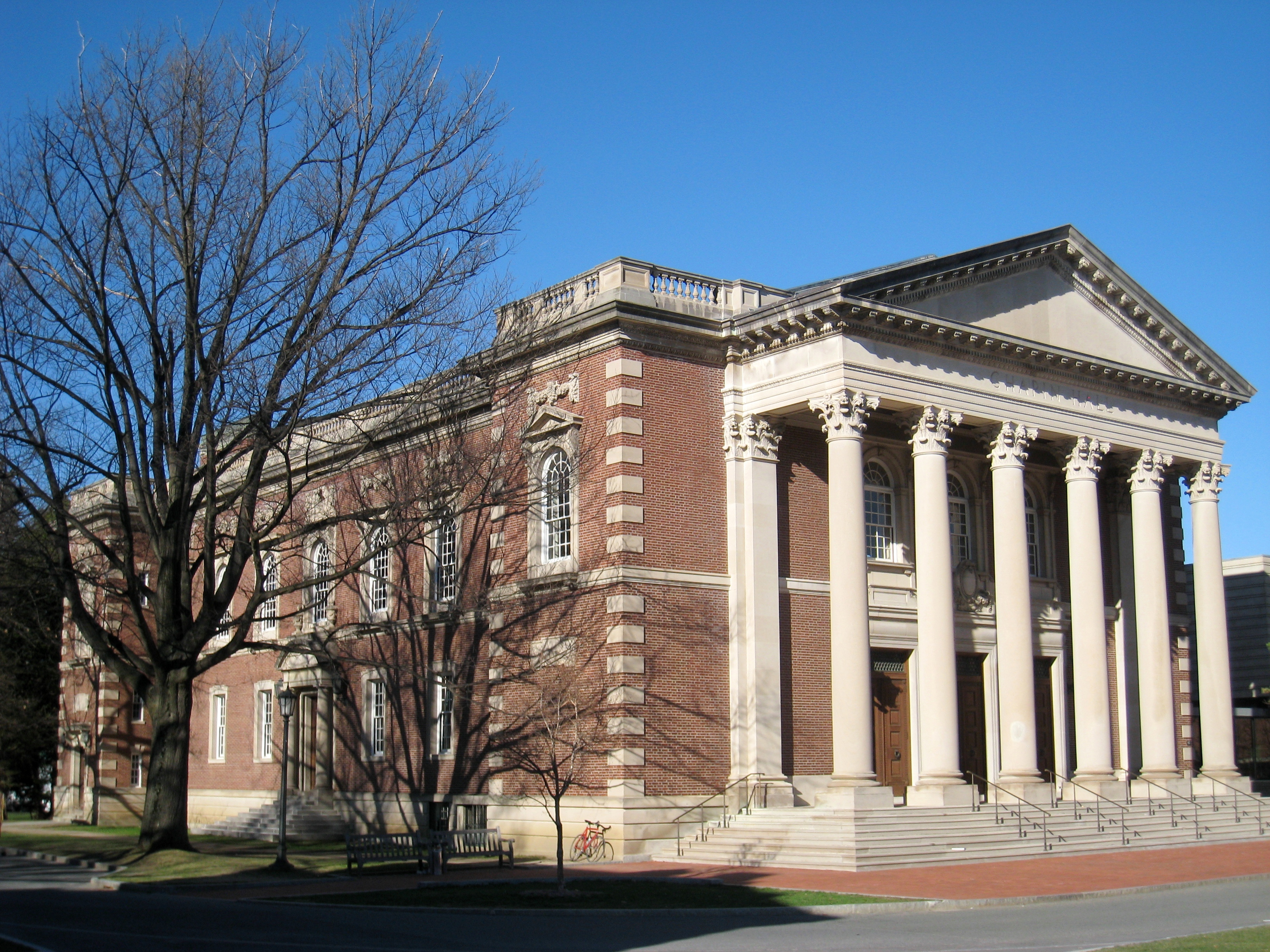
Chapin Hall

=== Winter study ===
Williams follows a 4-1-4 schedule, with the month of January dedicated to "Winter Study", a time when students take one course (or more) on campus or engage in an international program, an internship, or independent research project. A significant number of Winter Study courses are taught by Williams College alumni, and feature topics otherwise not covered in a traditional liberal arts curriculum—such as financial accounting, entrepreneurship, journalism, and yoga. Winter Study courses change yearly—the catalog features international programs in public health (where students travel to Nicaragua or Liberia), cultural immersion (for example, programs in Morocco and France), and political work (for example, a three-week internship program in the government of the Republic of Georgia).

=== Oxbridge tutorials ===
Certain portions of the Williams education are modeled after the tutorial systems at the universities of Oxford and Cambridge. Although tutorials at Williams were originally aimed at upperclassmen, the faculty voted in 2001 to expand the tutorial program. There is now a diverse offering of tutorial courses that span many disciplines, including math and sciences, and cater to students of all class years. In 2009–2010 alone, 62 tutorials were offered in 21 departments. Enrollment for tutorials is capped at 10 students, who are then divided into five pairs that each meet separately with the professor once a week. Each week, one student in each tutorial pair writes and presents a 5–7-page paper while the other student writes a critique response. The same pair reverses roles for the next week. The professor takes a more limited role than in a traditional lecture class and usually allows the students to steer and guide the direction of the conversation. Professor (and former Dean and English Department Chair) Stephen E. Fix was one of the early advocates for expanding the tutorial system at Williams and worked to increase support for the concept and the number of tutorial classes offered to students.

Student course evaluations for tutorials are typically very high. In a survey of alumni who had taken tutorials, more than 80% rated their tutorials as "the most valuable of my courses" at Williams.

== Student activities and traditions ==
=== Student media ===
The longest-running student newspaper at Williams is the Williams Record, a weekly broadsheet paper published on Wednesdays. The newspaper was founded in 1887, and now has a weekly circulation of 3,000 copies distributed in Williamstown, in addition to more than 600 subscribers across the country. The newspaper formerly received no financial support from the college or from the student government and relied on revenue generated by local and national ad sales, subscriptions, and voluntary contributions for use of its website, but the paper went into debt in 2004 and is now subsidized by the Student Activities Tax. Both Sawyer Library and the College Archives maintain more than a century's worth of publicly accessible, bound volumes of the Record. The newspaper provides access free of charge to a searchable database of articles stretching back to 1998 on its website.

The student yearbook is called The Gulielmensian, which means "Williamsian" in Latin. It was published irregularly in the 1990s, but has been annual for the past several years and dates back to the mid-19th century.

Numerous smaller campus publications are also produced each year, including The Telos, a journal of Christian thought; The Haybale, a humor magazine; the Williams College Law Journal, a collection of undergraduate articles; the Literary Review, a literary magazine; and Monkeys With Typewriters, a magazine of non-fiction essays.

==== 91.9 WCFM ====
WCFM is a college-owned, student-run, non-commercial radio station broadcasting from the basement of Prospect House at 91.9 MHz. Featuring 85 hours per week of original programming, the station features a wide variety of musical genres, in addition to sports and talk radio. The station may also be heard on the Internet via SHOUTcast.com. Members of the surrounding communities above the age of 18 are allowed to DJ on the station, which, as part of its mission, seeks to serve the surrounding community with news and announcements of public interest. The board of the radio station has held a handful of concerts.

=== Trivia contest ===
At the end of every semester but one since 1966, WCFM has hosted an all-night, eight-hour trivia contest. Teams of students, alumni, professors, friends, and others compete to answer questions on a variety of subjects, while simultaneously identifying songs and performing designated tasks. The winning team's only prize is the obligation to create and host the following semester's contest.

The precise date of the debut contest is uncertain. Most spring contests occur in early May, but during its first decade, Williams Trivia was sometimes held in March or February. Assuming a May date, Lawrence University's 50-hour-long Great Midwest Trivia Contest, first held on April 29, 1966, would be the oldest continuous competition of its sort in the United States, but if the first Williams contest was held earlier, it would be the oldest.

While other college-based trivia contests in the United States emphasize marathon endurance and revel in the obscurity of their arcana, the aim of the Williams contest is to cram as much evocative and entertaining material into as concentrated a space as possible. Lasting just eight hours, a typical Williams Trivia contest will demand between 900 and 1,200 separate "bits" of trivial information, delivering twice as much content as its "competitors" in a fraction of the time. No discernible rivalry exists between any of the various contests. The contest has occasionally received outside media coverage, including in the New York Times.

=== School colors and mascot ===
Williams's school colors are purple and gold, with purple as the primary school color. A story explaining the origin of purple as a school color says that at the Williams-Harvard baseball game in 1869, spectators watching from carriages had trouble telling the teams apart because there were no uniforms. One of the onlookers bought ribbons from a nearby millinery store to pin on Williams's players, and the only color available was purple. The buyer was Jennie Jerome (later Winston Churchill's mother) whose family summered in Williamstown.

The Williams college mascot is a purple cow. The mascot's name, Ephelia, was submitted in a radio contest in October 1952 by Theodore W. Friend, a senior at Williams. The origins of the cow mascot are unknown, but one possibility is that it was inspired by the Purple Cow humor magazine, a student publication begun in 1907, which used the college color along with a cow.

=== Alma mater ===
Williams claims the first alma mater song written by an undergraduate, "The Mountains", was by Washington Gladden of the class of 1859.

In 2016, a college-wide contest was held for a new official Williams song. The winner was "Echo of Williams", music by Kevin Weist, class of 1981, and lyrics by Bruce Leddy, class of 1983.

=== Mountain Day ===
On one of the first three Fridays in October, the president of the college cancels classes and declares it Mountain Day. The bells ring, announcing the event, members of the Outing Club unfurl a banner from the roof of Chapin Hall and students hike up Stony Ledge. At Stony Ledge, they celebrate with donuts, cider and a cappella performances.

The first known mention of Mountain Day was made in 1827 by Williams president Edward Dorr Griffin in his notebook on college business. He wrote, under 'Holidays': "About the 24th of June a day to go to the mountain. If not then about the 14th of July. Prayers at night."

In 2009, with the threat of bad weather for each of the first three Fridays of the month, Interim-president Wagner declared "Siberian Mountain Day". Festivities were relocated from Stony Ledge to the much more accessible Stone Hill.

=== Alpine Club of Williamstown ===
In 1863 Professor Albert Hopkins founded the Alpine Club of Williamstown, one of the first mountain clubs in America. Most significantly, it was likely the first hiking club of any type in the world to include women. In addition to Professor Albert Hopkins, Professor Paul Chadbourne and Reverend Harry Hopkins, there were nine unmarried ladies from Williamstown who formed the nucleus of the original club. Over the course of its first year four more women and nine men were added to the membership rolls. Most of the new male members were students from Williams College, among them Samuel H. Scudder, who would become one of the co-founders of the Appalachian Mountain Club in 1876.

== Athletics ==
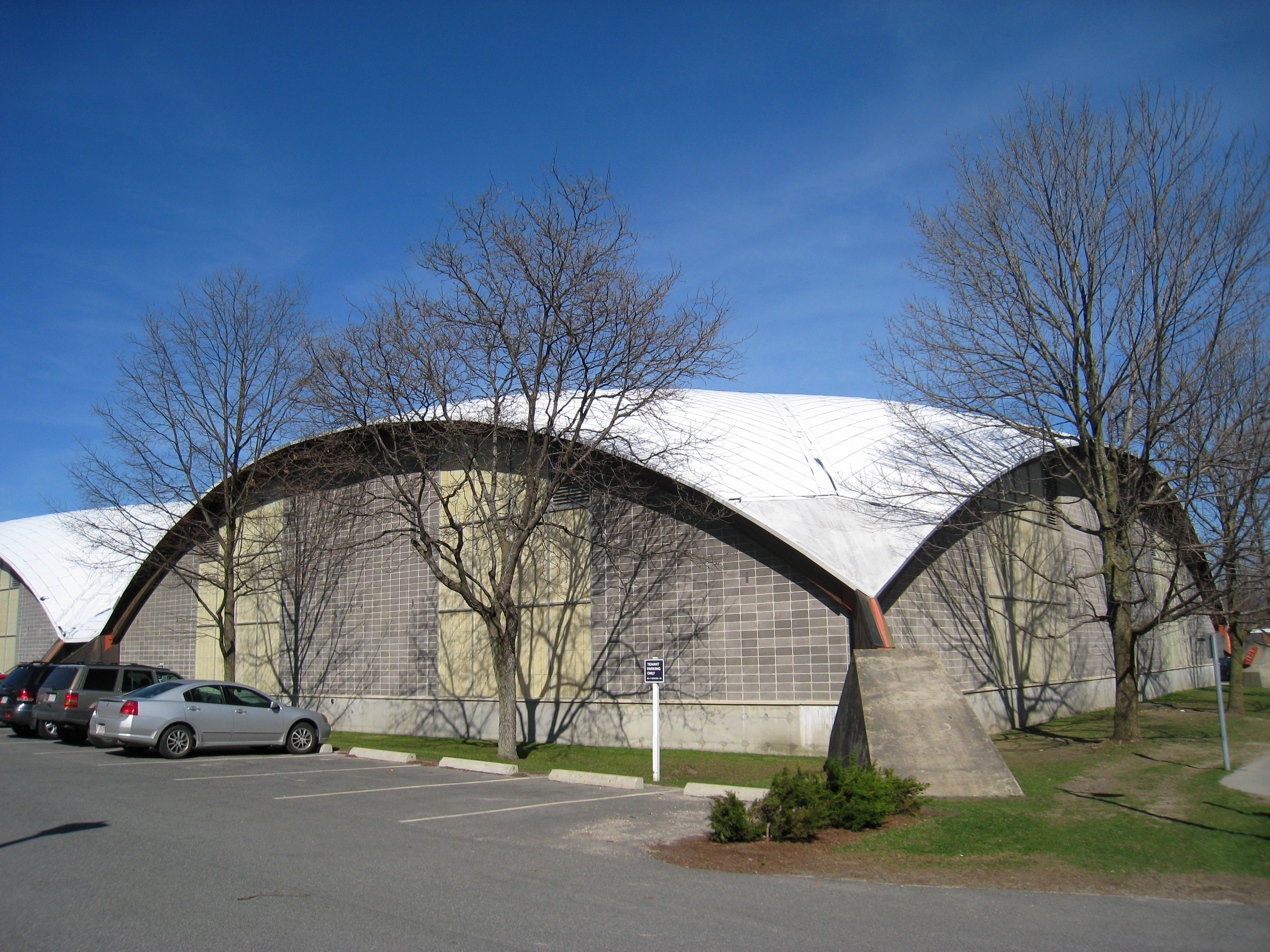
Towne Field House

The school's athletic teams (except for the men's rugby team, the White Dawgs) are called the Ephs (rhymes with "chiefs"), a shortening of the first name of founder Ephraim Williams. The mascot is a Purple Cow. They participate in the NCAA's Division III and the New England Small College Athletic Conference. Williams also competes in skiing and squash at the Division I level. Williams is ranked first among Division III schools for athletic spending per student.

Williams has a traditional rivalry with Amherst College and Wesleyan University. The "Little Three", a subset of NESCAC, comprises the three schools Although Williams College typically sports purple and gold as their school colors, purple is in fact the only school color. The gold was added in order to differentiate its colors from that of rival school Amherst's purple and white uniforms. On May 3, 2009, Williams and Amherst alumni played a game of vintage baseball at Wahconah Park according to 1859-rules to commemorate the 150th-anniversary of the first college baseball game, which was played on July 2, 1859, between the two schools.

Until 1994, Williams was not permitted, by NESCAC rules, to compete in team NCAA competition. The Williams women's swimming and diving team won the school's first national title in 1981, and claimed the title in 1982 as well. Williams played in the 2003, 2004, 2010, and 2014 men's basketball Division III national championship games, winning the title in March 2003. Men's basketball also played in the 1997, 1998, 2011, and 2017 Final Fours. Williams was the first New England basketball team to win a Division III championship, and since they have been eligible to compete in the NCAA tournament, no team in the country has played in more Final Fours.

Williams teams to win national titles since Williams began participating in NCAA tournaments in 1994 include women's crew (nine titles, including eight straight from 2006 to 2013), men's tennis (four), women's tennis (nine, including six straight from 2008 to 2013), women's soccer (three, 2015, 2017–18), men's cross country (two), women's cross country (three), men's basketball, women's indoor track and field (two), women's golf (2015), and men's soccer (1995). The Men's Crew team won the inaugural DIII IRA championship in 2022.

Williams has won the NACDA Director's Cup 22 of the 24 years since its inception, including 13 years in a row from 1999 through 2011.

Williams also has an active club and intramural sports program, offering 14 club sports including ultimate, rugby, horseback riding, cycling, fencing, volleyball, gymnastics, sailing, and water polo. Approximately 50% of Williams's students compete on at least one varsity, junior varsity, or formal club team.

=== Athletic facilities ===
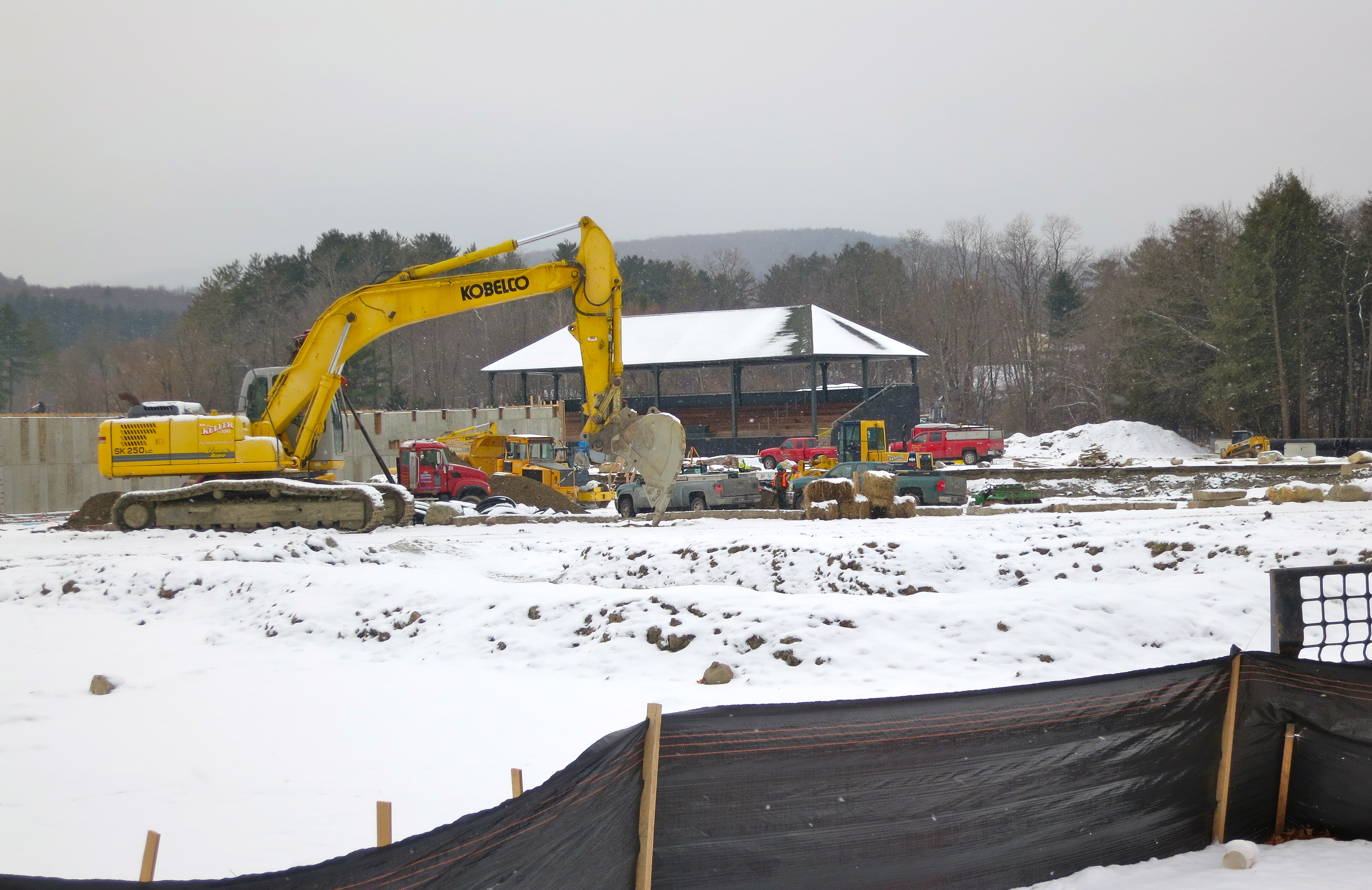
Renovation of Weston Field Athletic Complex – January 2014. The wooden grandstand behind the excavator was built in 1902. It was moved in 1987 to the new Plansky Track and football field and was moved again during the renovations that were completed in September 2014.

Williams College has had major updates or renovations of its athletic facilities during the past several decades.

The Lansing Chapman hockey rink, built in 1953 and originally uncovered, was canopied in 1963, enclosed in 1969 and has been periodically upgraded to the present (2014) with rink, roof, locker room and lighting improvements.

The Towne Field House, constructed in 1970, is a multipurpose facility, which includes an indoor track, tennis courts and a climbing wall. The last was initially constructed in 1974 and updated to a state-of-the-art climbing wall in 1995. Towne Field House's track was resurfaced in 2019. The field house also accommodates pre-season baseball, softball and lacrosse.

The Lasell Gym, built in 1886, was renovated and expanded with the addition of the Chandler Athletic Center in 1987. It provides a state-of-the-art 50-meter swimming pool, a gymnasium primarily for basketball, squash facilities, wrestling rooms, various fitness centers and administrative offices.

In 1987, the Weston Field cinder running track and baseball field were replaced: the Anthony Plansky 400-meter track was built around the refurbished football field, and the Bobby Coombs baseball field was relocated to Cole Field. The Renzi Lamb Field for lacrosse and field hockey, built with artificial turf, was added to Weston Field in 2004.

In November 2013 Williams College began its $22 million renovation of the Weston Field complex. This upgrade includes an artificial turf football field, relocation of the Plansky Track and Lamb Field, new bleachers, improved lighting and the addition of support buildings for the athletes. The completed facility, which reopened in September 2014, allows year-round athletic events and practice.

== People ==
=== Student body ===
Student body composition of Williams College
	Undergraduate	U.S. Census
Non-Hispanic White American	49.6%	61.8%
African American	4.6%	13.2%
Asian American	13.5%	5.3%
Hispanic American	12.2%	17.8%
Native American	0.1%	0.9%
Multiracial American	6.7%	2.6%
International student	8.2%	(N/A)
Unknown Race	5.0%	(N/A)

Williams enrolled 2,121 undergraduate students and 50 graduate students in 2021. Women constituted 51.6% of undergraduate students and 56.0% percent of graduate students. 48% of students received need-based financial aid averaging $63,516 in 2021, and 20% qualified to receive Pell Grants. The median family income of Williams students is $185,800, the third-highest in Massachusetts, with 55% of students coming from the top 10% highest-earning families and 20% from the bottom 60%. Williams has a 97% freshman retention rate and an 86% four-year graduation rate. 90% of first-years enrolled in the Class of 2021 graduated in the top tenth of their high school graduating class, and their inter-quartile range on the new SAT was 720–770 on Evidence-Based Reading and Writing, and 740–790 on Math. The inter-quartile range on the ACT was 33–35.

=== Faculty ===
Notable former and present faculty include:

- Colin Adams, mathematics professor and knot theorist, 2003 recipient of the Robert Foster Cherry Award for Great Teachers
- Andrea Barrett, National Book Award winning author and MacArthur Fellow
- Gene H. Bell-Villada, fiction writer, critic of Latin American literature, and historian of aesthetics
- Olga Beaver, professor of mathematics
- Robert Huntley Bell, professor of English
- Edward Burger, mathematics professor, 2010 recipient of the prestigious Robert Foster Cherry Award for Great Teaching
- James MacGregor Burns, professor of political science, founder of the modern field of leadership studies
- Franklin Carter, professor of Germanic and Romance languages
- Raymond Chang, who has written high school and college textbooks in chemistry
- William Graham Cole, religion professor and president of Lake Forest College and Nasson College
- Rónadh Cox, the Brust Professor of Geology and Mineralogy
- Andrea Danyluk, professor of computer science
- Emile Despres, professor of economics, a former advisor on German economic affairs at the U.S. Department of State
- Satyan Devadoss, award-winning mathematician and current Fletcher Jones Chair of Applied Mathematics and professor of computer science at the University of San Diego
- Charles B. Dew, author and Ephraim Williams Professor of American History
- S. Lane Faison, professor of art history, one of the most famous American art historians with many of his former students forming the "Williams Art Mafia"
- Steven Fein, professor of psychology, notable social psychologist
- Stephen Fix, professor of English
- Keith Fowler, who founded and directed professional repertory theaters in Virginia, and was later chief of directing at the Yale School of Drama and head of directing at the University of California, Irvine
- Robert Gaudino, former professor of political science
- Chris Gibson, former United States Congressman (New York) and current president of Siena College
- Louise Glück, winner of the 1993 Pulitzer Prize in poetry and 2020 Nobel Prize in Literature
- Darra Goldstein, Russian professor, founding editor of Gastronomica (2012 James Beard Best Publication) and author of award-winning cookbooks including The Georgian Feast (1994 IACP Julia Child Award) and Fire and Ice (2016 IACP Best International Cookbook nominee)
- Kermit Gordon of the economics department, who became Director of the United States Bureau of the Budget (now the Office of Management and Budget) during the administrations of Presidents John F. Kennedy and Lyndon B. Johnson.
- Neil R. Grabois, professor of mathematics, former president of Colgate University
- Harlan Hanson, former professor and director of the Advanced Placement program from 1965 to 1989:
- Pamela E. Harris, professor of mathematics, specializing in combinatorial algebra
- John Haskell Hewitt, professor of classical languages
- Alan Hirsch (professor), professor of political science
- Mark Hopkins (educator), famous educator and theologian
- Markes E. Johnson, emeritus professor of geosciences department
- Jason Josephson Storm, professor and chair of religion
- Saul Kassin, professor of psychology
- Elizabeth Kolbert, staff writer at The New Yorker and winner of the 2015 Pulitzer Prize for General Nonfiction for her book The Sixth Extinction: An Unnatural History
- Susan Loepp, award-winning mathematician
- John William Miller, professor of philosophy
- Steven J. Miller, mathematician and textbook author
- Frank Morgan, the Webster Atwell '21 Professor of Mathematics and former vice president of the American Mathematical Society
- Clara Claiborne Park (1923–2010), author who raised awareness of autism, and was, among her colleagues, perhaps the best essayist—literary critic—during her time.
- Paul Park, science-fiction author
- Jay Pasachoff in the astrophysics department, who used solar eclipse observations to study the sun
- Peter Pedroni, professor of economics
- William Pierson Jr., painter and art historian
- Morton Schapiro, professor of economics and current president of Northwestern University
- Frederick L. Schuman, professor of history
- Jim Shepard, novelist and writer
- Glenn Shuck, assistant professor of religion
- Theodore Clarke Smith, professor of American history and educational reformer
- John E. Stambaugh, professor of classics
- Joanne Stubbe, professor of chemistry and winner of the 2020 Priestley Medal
- Barbara Takenaga, award-winning artist
- Mark Taylor, who studied with Jacques Derrida and taught religion classes at Williams before moving to Columbia University.
- Alan White (American philosopher), professor of philosophy
- William Wootters, theoretical physicist known for proving the no cloning theorem
- Safa Zaki, McCoy professor of psychology and current president of Bowdoin College

=== Alumni ===
The Society of Alumni of Williams College is the oldest existing alumni society of any academic institution in the United States. The Society of Alumni was founded during the "Amherst crisis" in 1821, when Williams College President Zephaniah Swift Moore left Williams. Graduates of Williams formed the Society to ensure that Williams would not have to close, and raised enough money to ensure the future survival of the school. This fund formed by alumni served as the first college endowment in the United States, and as a result, Williams has maintained a legacy of high alumni involvement.

There are 30,699 living alumni of record, and 69 regional alumni associations nationwide and overseas. Alumni participation in the 2018–19 Alumni Fund was 54.1%. More than 61% of the alumni from the classes of 1980 to 2000 have earned at least one graduate or professional degree. The most popular graduate disciplines for alumni are management, education, law, and health care.

Prominent alumni include 9 Pulitzer Prize winners, a Nobel Prize laureate, a Fields medalist, a Lasker award recipient, 16 billionaires, 71 members of the United States Congress, 22 U.S. Governors, 4 U.S. Cabinet secretaries, an Associate Justice of the Supreme Court, a President of the United States, 3 prime ministers, CEOs and founders of Fortune 500 companies, multiple Emmy, Oscar, Tony, and Grammy award winners, and professional athletes. Other notable alumni include 40 Rhodes Scholars and 17 Marshall Scholarship recipients.

Notable Williams College alumni include:

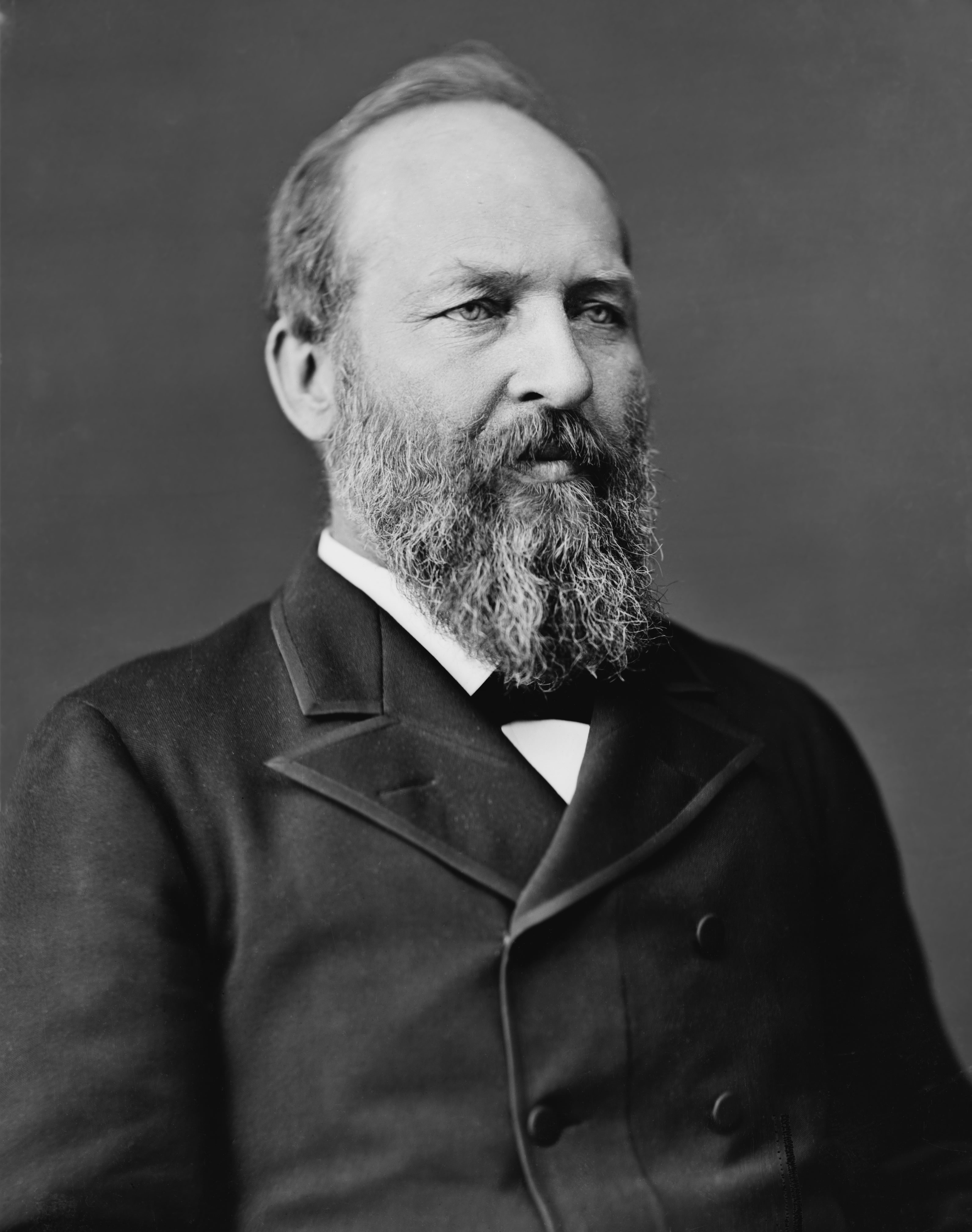
James A. Garfield, 20th president of the United States

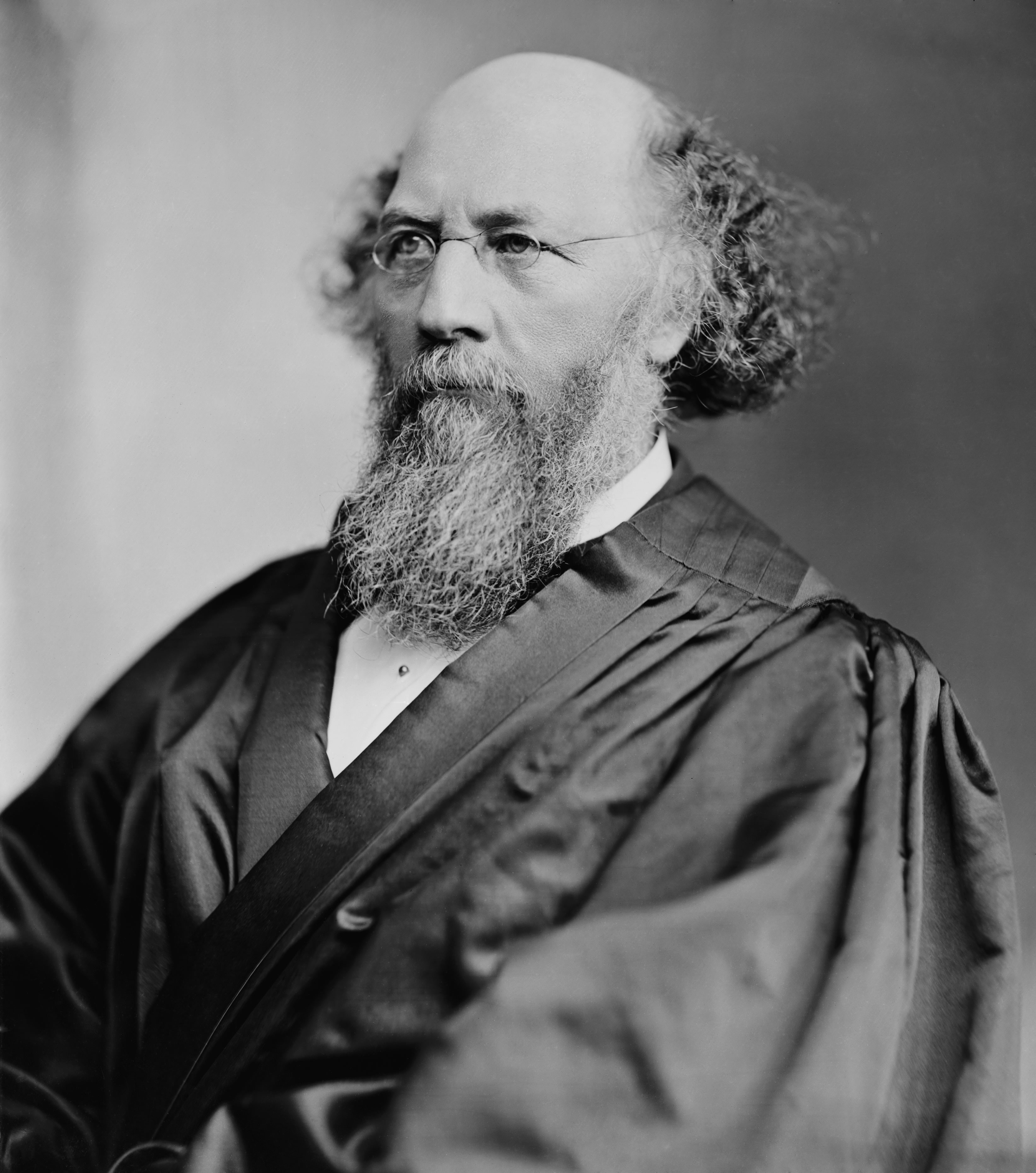
Stephen Johnson Field, former Associate Justice of the U.S. Supreme Court

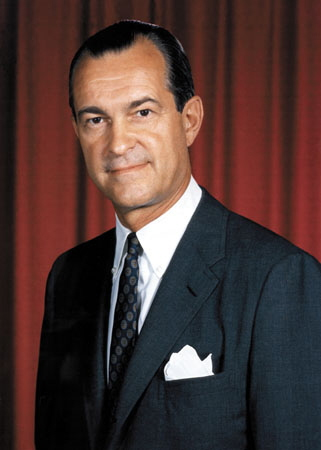
Richard Helms, 8th Director of Central Intelligence

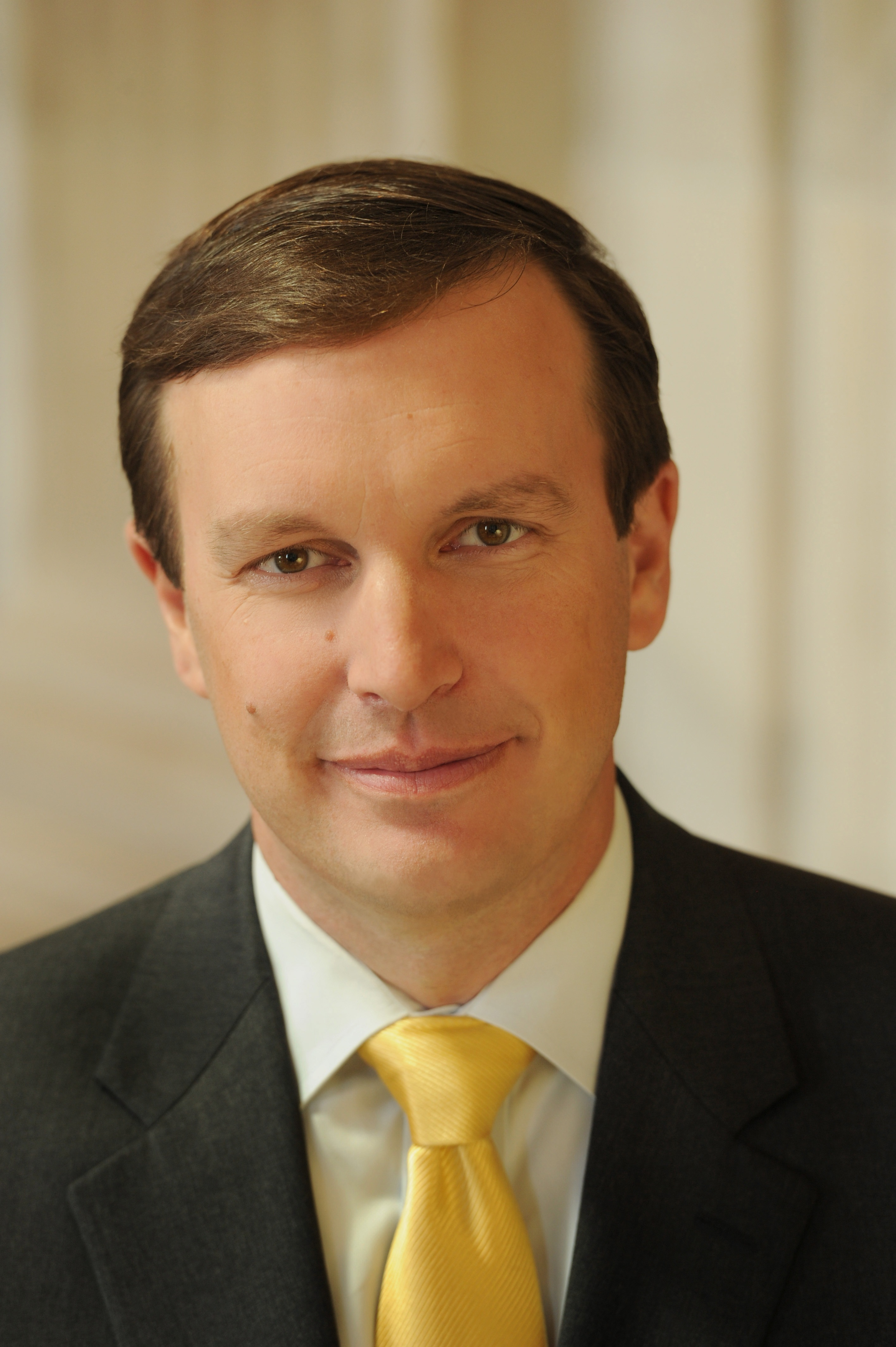
Chris Murphy, U.S. senator from Connecticut

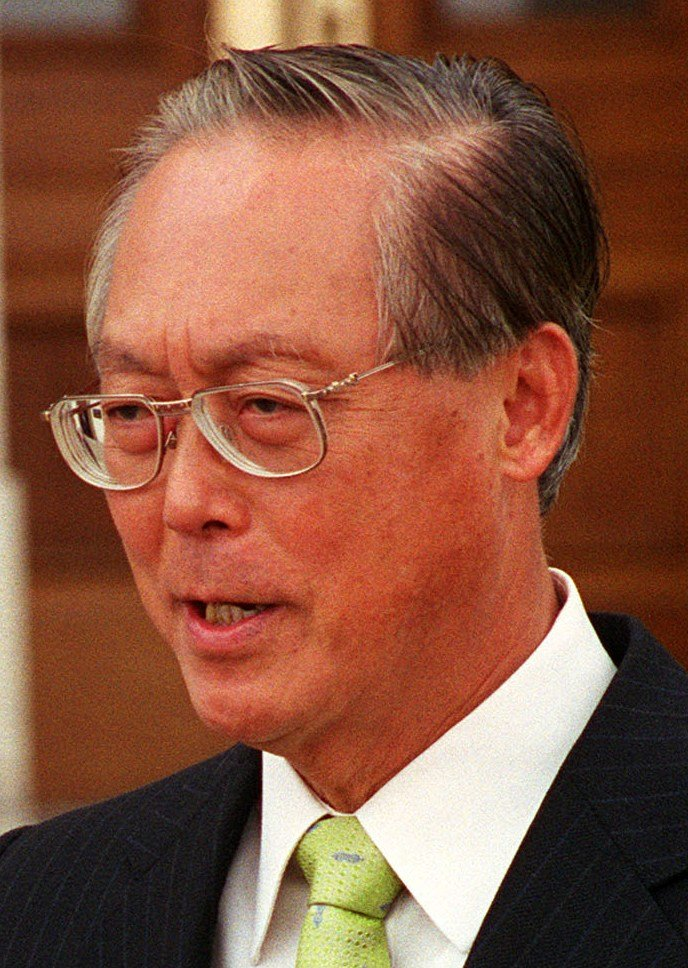
Goh Chok Tong, 2nd prime minister of Singapore

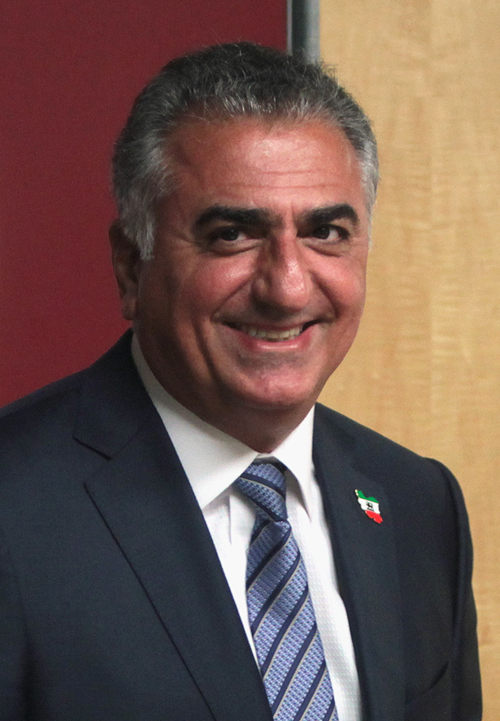
Reza Pahlavi, Crown Prince of Iran, last heir apparent to the throne of the Imperial State of Iran

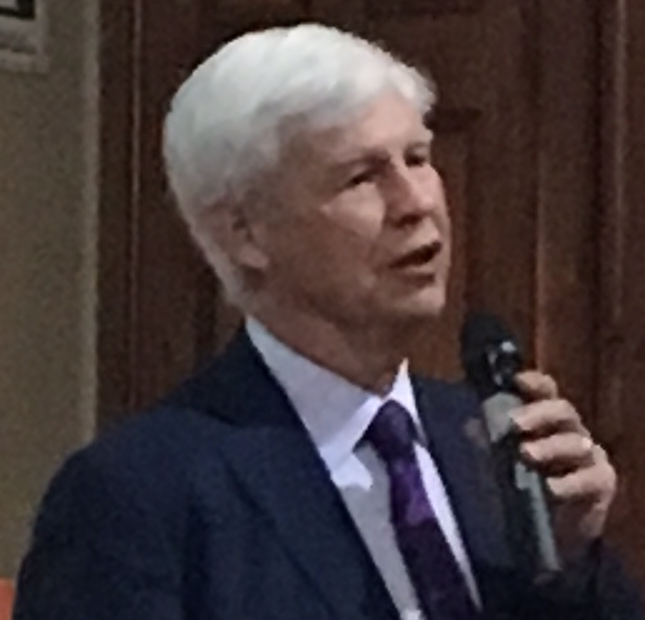
Robert F. Engle, Nobel Prize-winning economist

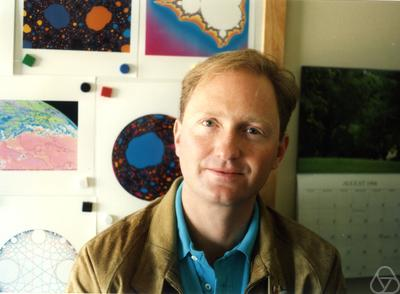
Curtis McMullen, American mathematician, Fields Medalist

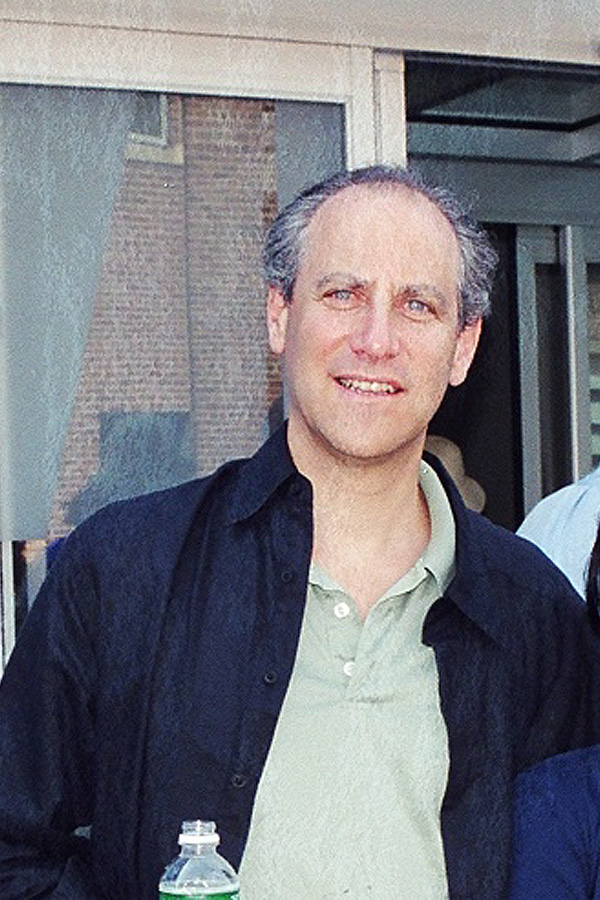
Glenn D. Lowry, Director of the Museum of Modern Art in New York City

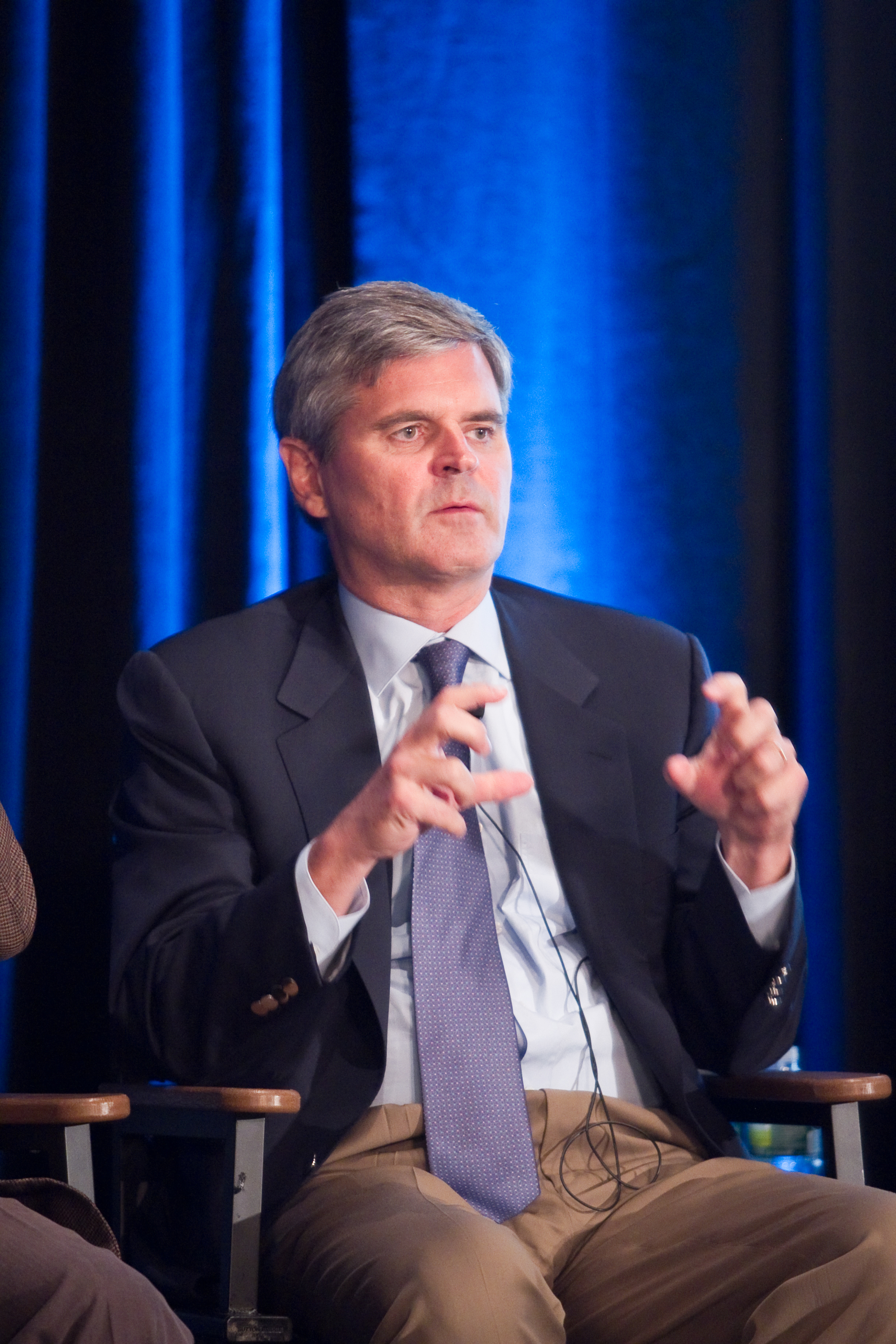
Steve Case, former CEO and chairman of AOL

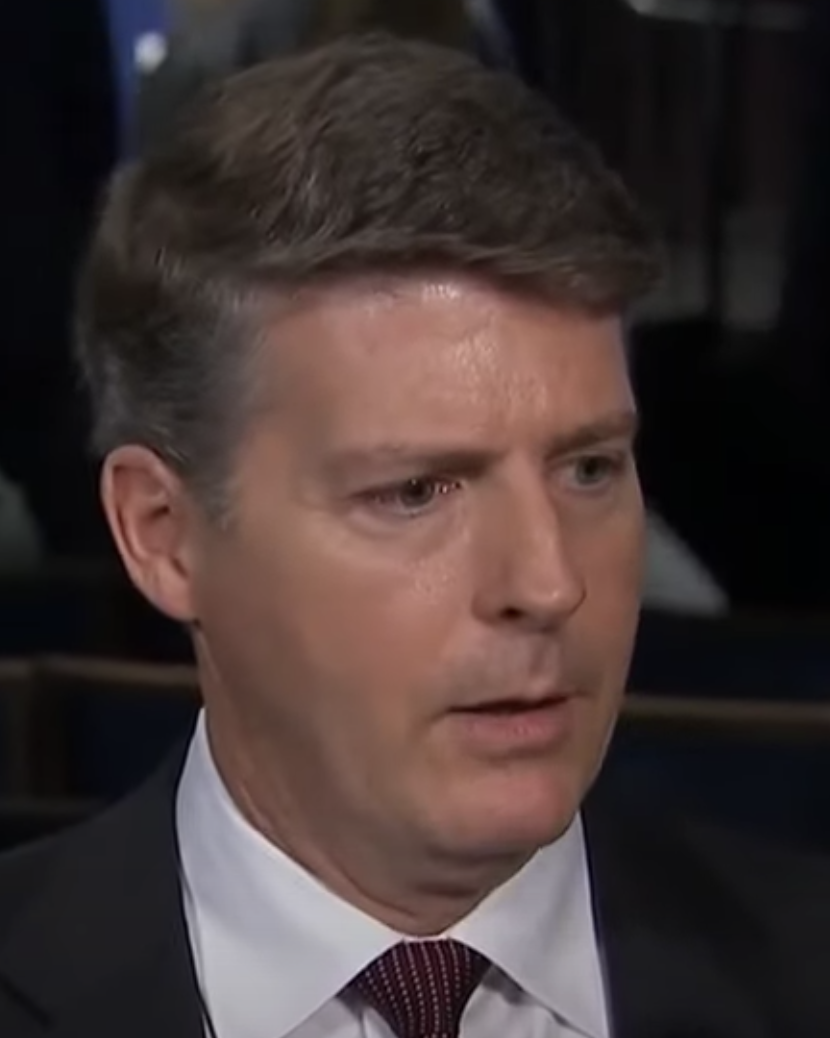
Hal Steinbrenner, owner, managing general partner, and chairman of the New York Yankees

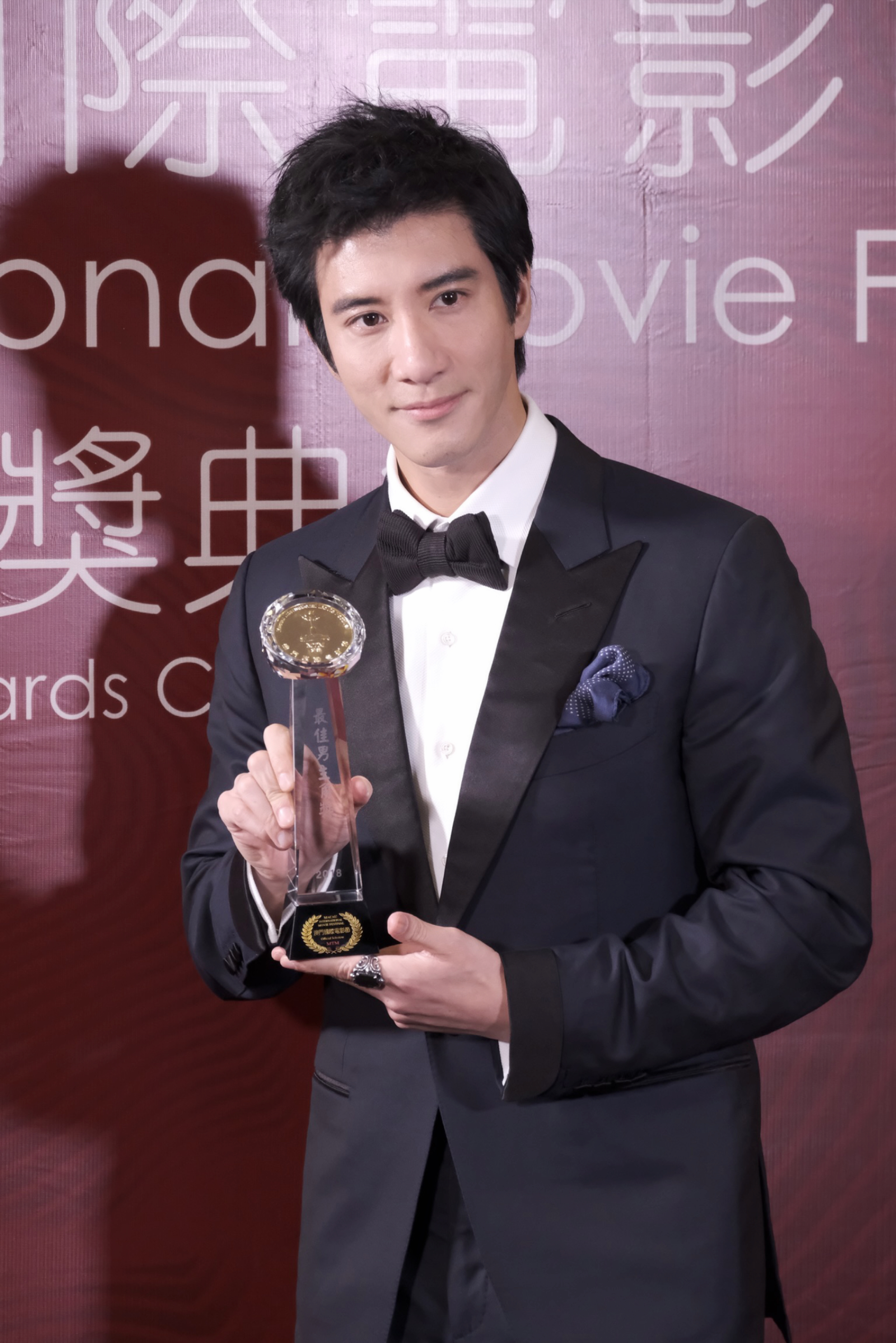
Wang Leehom, Chinese-American singer-songwriter, one of the most followed celebrities in China

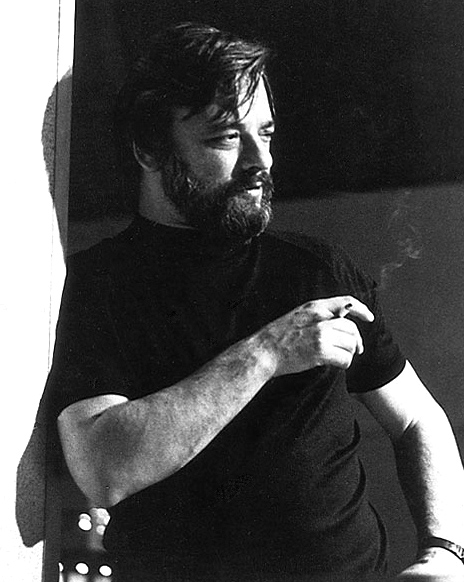
Stephen Sondheim, Pulitzer Prize and Tony Award-winning composer and lyricist

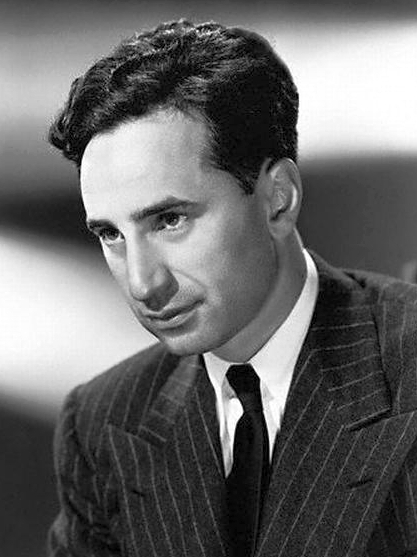
Elia Kazan, Academy Award-winning film director

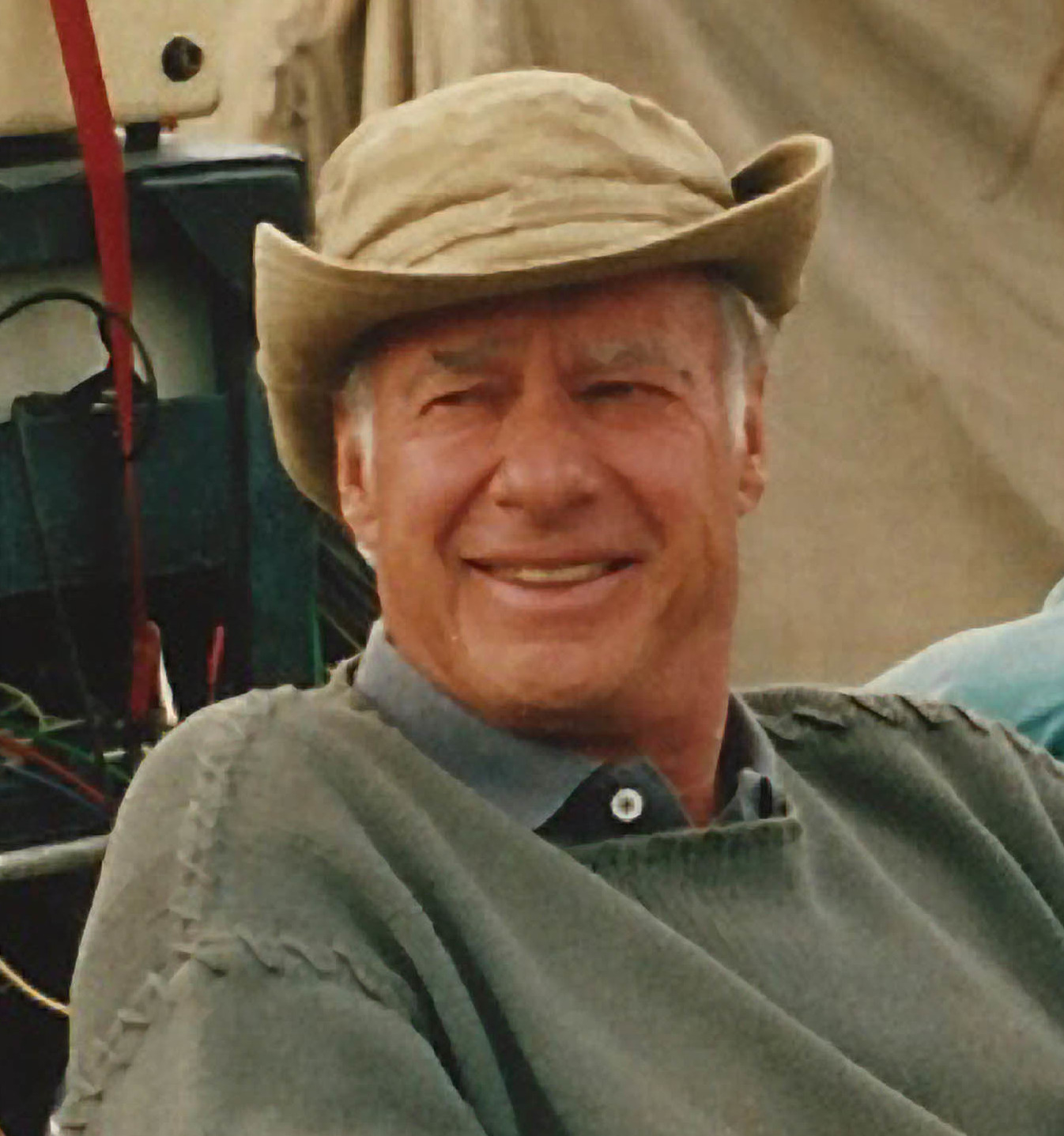
John Frankenheimer, Emmy Award-winning film and television director

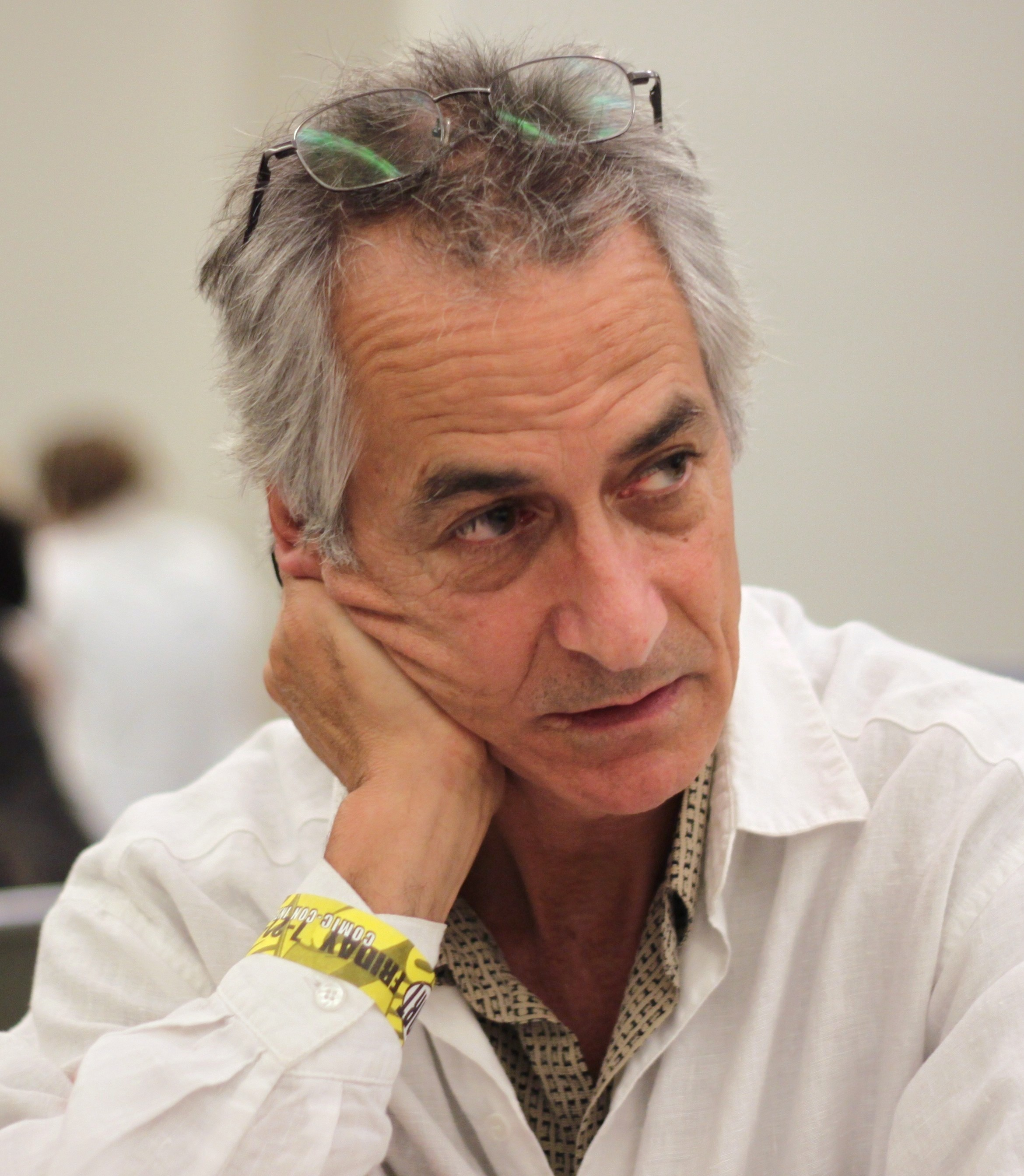
David Strathairn, Emmy Award-winning actor

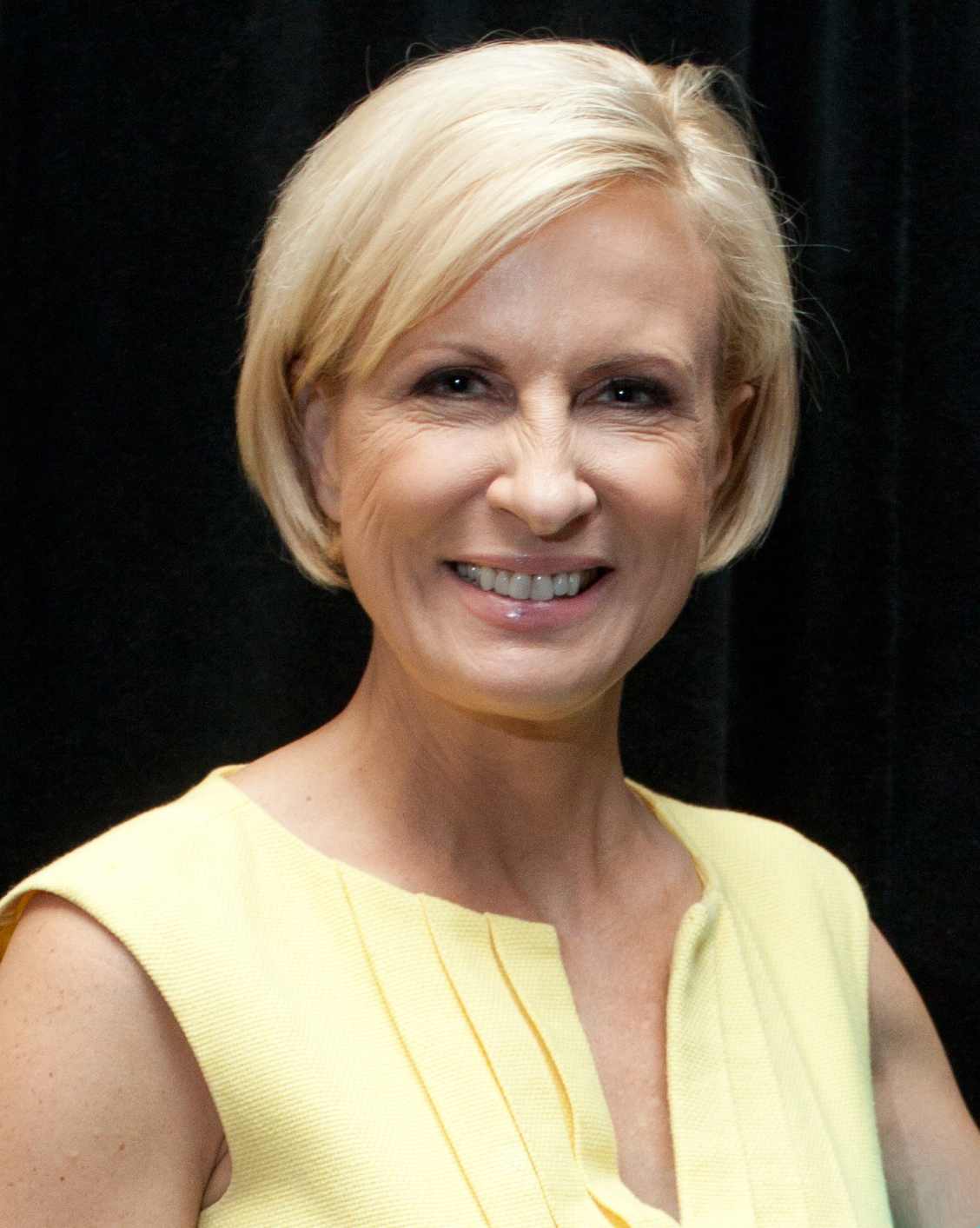
Mika Brzezinski, broadcast journalist

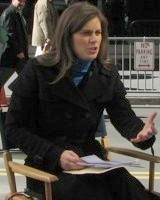
Erin Burnett, American news anchor

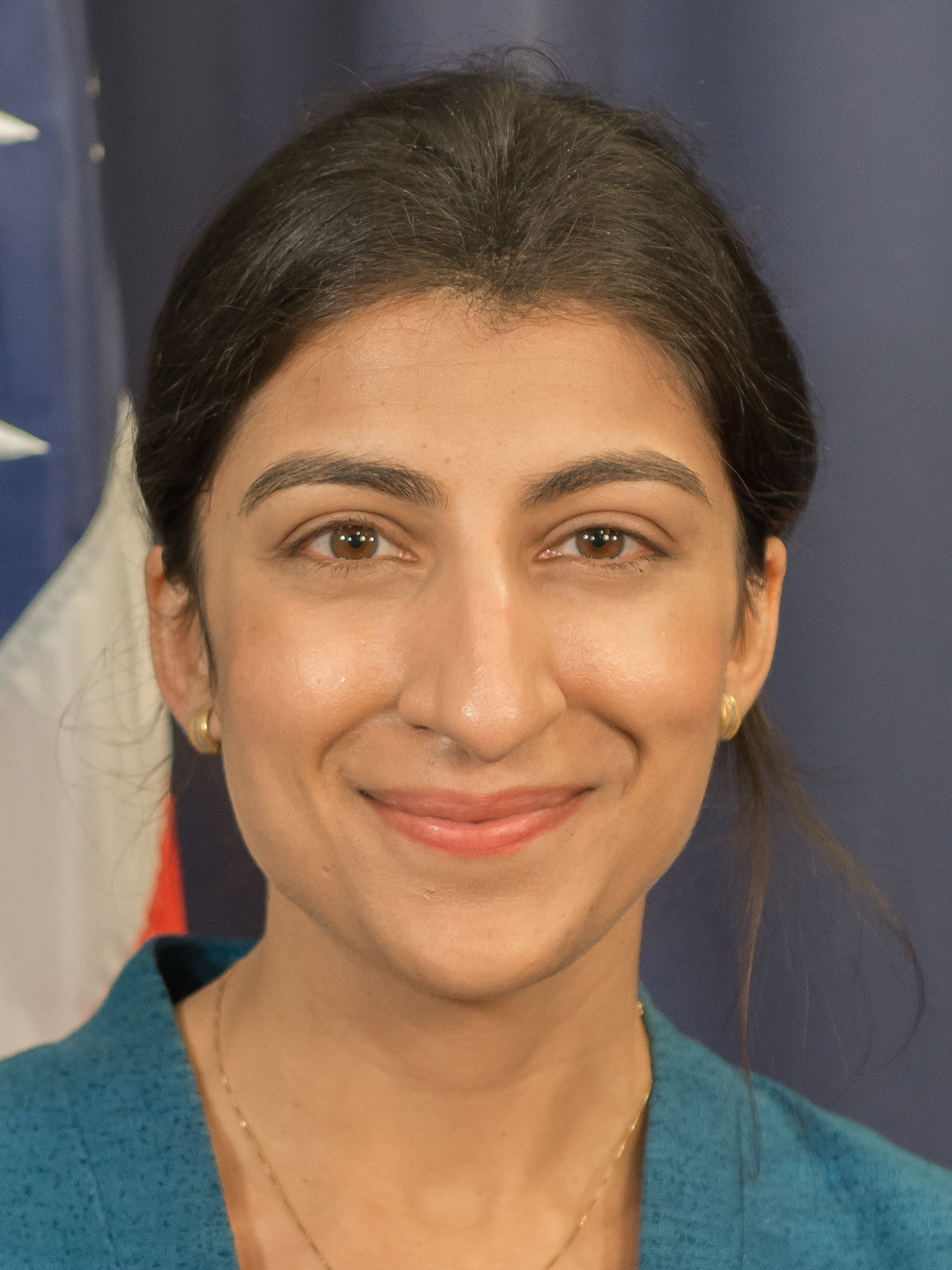
Lina Khan, former chair of the Federal Trade Commission

== See also ==
- List of Williams College Bicentennial Medal winners
- List of Williams College people
- Taconic Golf Club
- The Biggest Little Game in America
- Williams-Mystic
- Williamstown Theatre Festival
