= Williams–Mystic =

Williams–Mystic, the Ocean and Coastal Studies Semester of Williams College and Mystic Seaport Museum, is an interdisciplinary semester program based at the Mystic Seaport Museum in Mystic, Connecticut.

== Academics ==
Students at Williams–Mystic enroll in four courses: Maritime History, Marine Policy, Literature of the Sea, and either Oceanography or Marine Ecology. Students engage in independent research throughout the semester in each of the courses, engaging in personal interests as they relate to maritime studies. Each class concludes with a cumulative research project, exam, or academic paper. Courses are taught between classroom and collections space on the Mystic Seaport grounds and the 8,000-square-foot (740 m^{2}) James T. Carlton Marine Science Center (MSC), which opened in September 2007. The MSC offers facilities for teaching and research of estuarine/coastal biology and geology.

== Maritime Skills ==
Additionally, students participate in maritime skills courses taught by Mystic Seaport staff. These offerings include small-boat handling, sea chanteys, shipsmithing, canvas working, and demonstration squad.

== Field Seminars ==
Each semester is composed of three field seminars with varying locations: Offshore Sailing Voyage, the Pacific Coast, and the Gulf Coast. Traditionally the fall semester sails offshore in the Gulf of Maine and travels to Northern California, while the spring semester sails offshore in the Straits of Florida and travels to the Pacific Northwest. Each semester attends the Gulf Coast field seminar in Louisiana, unless you happened to participate in Fall 2013's experimental Hawaii Seminar.

Professors take their courses on the road (and sea) for each seminar, delivering their lectures in a wide variety of locations.

== Student life ==
At Williams–Mystic, a classmate can also be a roommate, housemate, or neighbor. Students are placed in one of five historic houses owned by Mystic Seaport, where they cook, clean, and socialize with their peers. These houses are steps away from Mystic Seaport's riverside grounds and, together with the administration building and Marine Science Center, comprise the program's very own Williams–Mystic neighborhood. This one-of-a-kind combination of residential and academic togetherness offers students a unique environment in which they explore the nation's maritime realm.

Student houses:

- Albion House- located directly across from the seaport on Greenmanville Ave, just around the corner from the rest of the houses.
- Carr House- the most recent addition to the program's collection of historic homes, and home to Sebastian the Flamingo.
- Johnston House- resembles Carr House in footprint and layout, with the exception of a garage that houses the program's bicycle fleet.
- Kemble House- located just behind Sturges Cottage, and is often used for T.A/Intern housing.
- Mallory House- the largest of the five houses, and is located just behind the administration building.

If the houses begin to feel a bit too cozy, the MSC provides students with a 24-hour research and study space, fully outfitted with computers, books, couches, desks, and a state-of-the-art marine science laboratory. Directly adjacent to the MSC is Sturges Cottage. Sturges Cottage is a communal recreational space where students can enjoy cable TV, a foosball table, a piano, and basic workout equipment.

Students of the Williams–Mystic program have 24-hour access to the Mystic Seaport and its facilities, and students will often take advantage of their all-access pass for both recreational and scholastic purposes. Whether students want to read Herman Melville's Moby Dick aboard the country's last remaining 19th Century whaling ship, or they just want to take one of the seaport's dinghies out for an afternoon sail, students are sure to find a space within the seaport that peaks their maritime interests.

Away from the classroom and the seaport grounds, students will continue to find plenty of local attractions to occupy their time with. On the weekends, students will often organize group activities such as: trips to the Mystic Aquarium, bike rides around the river (which is actually an estuary), walks downtown for a scoop of Drawbridge Ice cream, a game of basketball at the Mystic YMCA, or even an inter-house potluck.

== Participating Colleges ==
Williams–Mystic welcomes students from all universities. These are a few of the institutions that participants typically hail from:

- Williams College
- California Maritime Academy
- Amherst College
- Bowdoin College
- Colby College
- University of Connecticut (Storrs and Avery Point campuses)
- Dartmouth College
- Middlebury College
- Oberlin College
- University of Rhode Island
- SUNY Maritime College
- Smith College
- Wesleyan University
