= Protik Majumder =

American physicist (born 1960)

Interim President of Williams College
- In office January 2018 – July 1, 2018
- Preceded by: Adam Falk
- Succeeded by: Maud Mandel

Personal details
- Education: Yale University (BS); Harvard University (PhD)

Protik "Tiku" Majumder (born 1960) is a physicist who is the Barclay Jermain Professor of Natural Philosophy at Williams College. He was the interim president of Williams from December 2017 to July 2018, replacing Adam Falk, who left to become president of the Alfred P. Sloan Foundation. He was replaced by Maud Mandel.

== Early life and education ==
Majumder was born in Kolkata and was raised in Western Massachusetts. He graduated with a bachelor's degree from Yale University in 1982 and obtained his Ph.D. in atomic physics from Harvard University in 1989. He joined the faculty of Williams College in 1994.
