= William G. Wagner =

American historian (1950–2021)

Interim President of Williams College
- In office July 1, 2009 – March 31, 2010
- Preceded by: Morton Schapiro
- Succeeded by: Adam Falk

Personal details
- Born: May 28, 1950
- Died: September 12, 2021 (aged 71)
- Education: Haverford College (BA); University of Oxford (BPhil, DPhil)

Academic work
- Discipline: History

William G. Wagner (May 28, 1950 – September 12, 2021) was an American historian. His research focused on modern Russia. He joined the faculty of Williams College in 1980, after graduating from Haverford College and earning advanced degrees from the University of Oxford. Wagner was raised in Erie, Pennsylvania, and was educated at Strong Vincent High School, where he played football. From 2009 to 2010, he was the interim president of Williams. He was also Brown Professor of History Emeritus. He died on September 21, 2021, in Williamstown, Massachusetts, aged 71.
