= Williams Rugby Football Club =

Williams Rugby
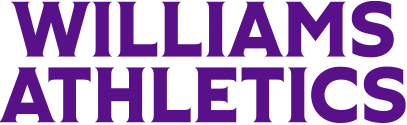
- Full name: Williams Rugby Football Club
- Union: USA Rugby
- Nickname: White Dawgs
- Founded: 1959
- Location: Williamstown
- Ground: Cole Field
- President: Elijah Adu ‘25
- Coach(es): Matt Bentley (Forwards Coach), Tim Reisler (Backs Coach)
- Captain: Ignacio Feged ‘27
- League(s): New England Rugby Football Union, National Small College Rugby Organization

Official website
- williamscollegerugby.com

The Williams Rugby Football Club (WRFC) and the Williams Women's Rugby Football Club (WWRFC) are intercollegiate club sports teams at Williams College in Williamstown, Massachusetts. The men's club was founded in the spring of 1959 by David Coughlin with support from J. Peter Pierson, the team's first coach. The men's and women's clubs play in NERFU Division II. Beyond the sport itself, the teams endeavor to foster a sense of community for participants and to provide a safe social environment not only for the players on the team but for the Williams community as a whole.

== Origins ==
=== Men's team ===
The Williams Rugby Football Club (WRFC) was founded by David Coughlin '61 in the spring of 1959 following spending a year studying abroad at Glenalmond College, Scotland. Starting with a handful of incoming freshmen with experience playing rugby while studying in England, the Club was formed and supported by Peter Pearson, the first Williams Rugby coach. The following fall, the WRFC entered the Eastern Rugby Union (ERU) and won the ERU Championship in 1960 with a 5-0-1 record. Following a 1962 tour in England, support and recognition from the College increased dramatically.

The distinctive Williams Rugby Football Club crest was designed by Coughlin and Pearson, and the team colors, claret and gold, were borrowed from Pearson's home team Huddersfield RFC. During the initial days of Williams Rugby, the college was reluctant to endorse and support the Club, so Pearson contacted his teammates at Huddersfield who provided the initial contributions of balls, equipment, and claret and gold uniforms. While the rest of Williams College's athletic teams sport purple and gold, the WRFC and WWRFC sport claret and gold to honor their comrades from Huddersfield.

=== Women's team ===
The Williams Women's Rugby Football Club (WWRFC) was founded in 1976, six years following the decision to make Williams co-ed, by John Greer and Dave Libardi.

== Traditions ==
=== Amherst rivalry ===
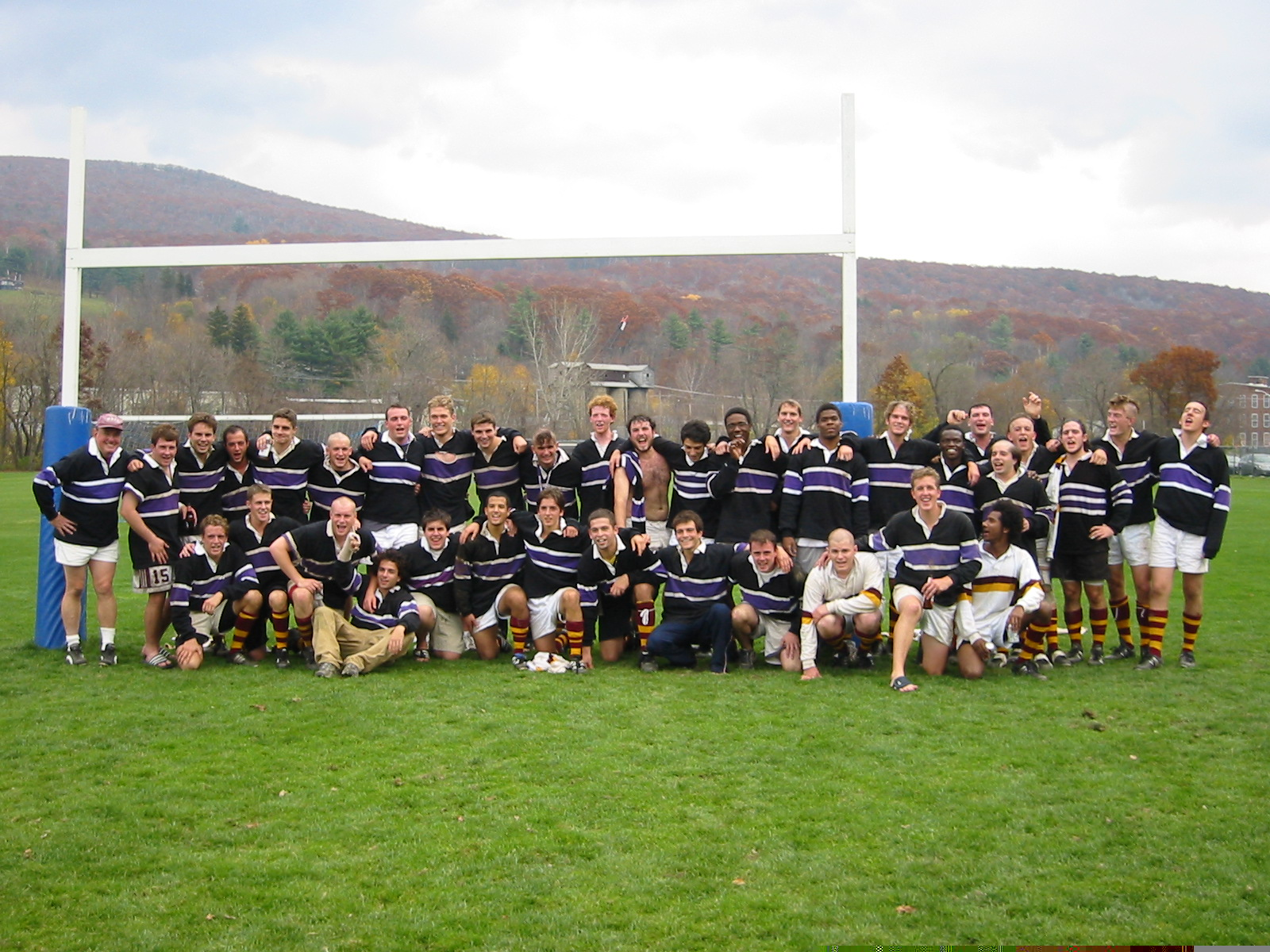
The White Dawgs in 2003. The starting lineup is wearing the jerseys of their defeated rivals, Amherst

Like other sports teams at Williams College, both the men's and women's teams have a long-standing rivalry with Amherst College. As a part of the WRFC's rivalry with Amherst, both teams' starting lineups bet their jerseys on the outcome of the game, with the losing team forfeiting his or her jerseys.

The WWRFC has a long-standing tradition of wearing their jerseys for the entire week prior to their annual game with Amherst. If the WWRFC were to lose to Amherst, Amherst would receive smelly and muddy jerseys.

Year	Season	Score	Location
2015	Fall	17–13	Amherst
2016	Spring	39–7	Williams
2016	Fall	34–14	Williams
2017	Spring	31–11	Amherst
2017	Fall	29–8	Amherst
2018	Spring	53–12	Williams
2018	Fall	12–5	Williams
2019	Spring	0–24	Amherst
2019	Fall	15–19	Williams
2019	Fall	10–14	Amherst

=== John Donovan Memorial Tournament ===
Every year, the men's rugby team hosts the John Donovan Memorial Tournament in the springtime, a rugby tournament and fundraiser to support the mental health services at the Brien Center. The tournament is held in honor of John Donovan, a rugby alumnus of Williams College who committed suicide as a result of unresolved mental illness.

== Mottos ==
The men's and women's undergraduate teams are known as the White Dawgs (as opposed to "ephs," the moniker of the rest of Williams College athletic teams). The men's alumni are known as the Olde Fartes. Their men's motto is "Nihil in Moderato", loosely-translated Latin for "nothing in moderation". The women's team alumnae are known as "Used Bagges," and their team motto is "Scite Terroris," which translates from Latin as "Know Fear."

== Notable alumni ==
- Jess Beck, entrepreneur and co-founder of Hello Alfred
- Chris Murphy – United States Senator from Connecticut
- Chap Petersen - Virginia State Senator
