= William Pierson Jr. =

American painter and art historian (1911–2008)

William Harvey Pierson Jr. (June 4, 1911 – December 3, 2008) was an American painter and art historian. Teaching studio art and art history at Williams College for most of his career, Pierson was in large part responsible for the development of the cadre of Williams-educated museum curators and art historians now known as the Williams Art Mafia, including Earl A. Powell III of the National Gallery of Art in Washington DC, Glenn D. Lowry of the Museum of Modern Art in New York, James N. Wood of the Art Institute of Chicago and the J. Paul Getty Trust and Thomas Krens of the Guggenheim Museum in New York.

Born in Bloomfield, New Jersey, Pierson trained as a high-school student with landscape painter Charles Warren Eaton. After earning bachelor's degree in fine arts at Yale in 1934, he became the first person whom the school awarded a master's degree in fine arts. In 1941 he received a second master's, this time in art history from New York University.

Pierson joined the United States Navy the day after Pearl Harbor, working for the secret radio program. When the war finished, Pierson decided to return to Yale to undertake a Ph.D. in art history. His dissertation studied the industrial architecture of New England, and his passion for this subject remained with him for the rest of his career. In the 1970s, he campaigned to save a former mill in Harrisville, New Hampshire. Due to his efforts and those of others, Harrisville is the only 19th-century mill town that has survived largely intact into the 21st century.

Having caught the eye of S. Lane Faison, head of the art history department at Williams College, Pierson moved to Williamstown to teach studio art and American architecture in 1946. With Faison and their colleague Whitney Stoddard, Pierson worked continuously to turn Williams students towards careers in art history rather than law and finance. Their efforts resulted in a generation of Williams-educated curators who went on to lead some of the most distinguished museums and art collections in the United States. This group, whom the New York Times has termed the "Williams Art Mafia", include among its ranks Earl A. Powell III of the National Gallery of Art in Washington DC, Glenn D. Lowry of the Museum of Modern Art in New York, James N. Wood of the Art Institute of Chicago and the J. Paul Getty Trust and Thomas Krens of the Guggenheim Museum in New York. Pierson, who was famous for tearing up his notes at the end of each of his lectures, emphasized the importance of maintaining the vitality and variety of his teaching throughout his thirty-year career. Pierson retired in 1973.

Although teaching undergraduates was Pierson's foremost passion, he also authored a four-volume scholarly series entitled American Buildings and Their Architects along with William Jordy. In conjunction with the Society of Architectural Historians, he was also working on the sixty-volume Buildings of the United States Series, which catalogs the architectural history of each of the fifty states in addition to several major cities.

Pierson died on December 3, 2008, in Williamstown, Massachusetts. He is survived by two daughters and two granddaughters.

== Books ==
- Pierson, William, H. Jr., and Davidson, Martha, editors, Arts of the United States: A Pictorial Survey (Athens GA : University of Georgia Press, 1966)
- Pierson, William H. Jr., American Buildings and Their Architects: The Colonial and Neoclassical Styles (Garden City NY: Doubleday, 1972)
- Pierson, William H. Jr., American Buildings and Their Architects: Technology and the Picturesque (Garden City NY: Doubleday, 1972)

== Other writings ==
- Pierson, William H. Jr., "The Beauty of a Belief: The Ames Family, Richardson, and Unitarianism," in Meister, Maureen, ed., H. H. Richardson: The Architect, His Peers, and Their Era (Cambridge MA: MIT Press, 1999)

== See also ==
- Williams College
- Williams College Museum of Art
