= LA Freewaves =

Art organization based in Los Angeles, US

Freewaves
- Founded: 1989
- Founded at: Los Angeles, California, USA
- Type: media arts
- Purpose: new media art
- Headquarters: Los Angeles, California, USA
- Region served: Worldwide
- Director: Anne Bray
- Website: freewaves.org

LA Freewaves, also known as Freewaves, is a Los Angeles–based nonprofit organization that exhibits multicultural, independent media and produces free public art projects to engage artists and audiences on current social issues. It was founded in 1989 by Anne Bray, the organization's executive director. With the support of others in the arts community, Freewaves presented its first exhibition of independent, multicultural video art at the November 1989 American Film Institute's (AFI) National Video Festival.

Freewaves presents media arts in public spaces and online. Utilizing unconventional venues for exhibiting experimental media art, its programs include video and media art, performance art events, live dialogues online, and a large digital video art archive. Freewaves holds a biennial art festival for independent and experimental media and hosts speakers on the topics of education, art, technology, race, gender, and media.

== Organization ==
=== Founding ===
The nonprofit LA Freewaves was founded in 1989 by Anne Bray, an artist, media teacher, and former video curator at Los Angeles Contemporary Exhibitions. Bray stated two initial objectives for Freewaves: to encourage collaboration within the local media community and to broaden their audience. She founded LA Freewaves with the help of 35 regional arts and community organizations. In November 1989, Freewaves presented its first exhibition of independent, multicultural video art at the AFI Video Festival.

=== Overview ===
LA Freewaves holds a biennial art festival of multicultural, independent video art exhibited citywide throughout Los Angeles. The art projects emphasize current social issues, promoting social justice and change. It also hosts speakers on the topics of education, art, technology, race, gender, and media. Notable media artists who have displayed work in Freewaves programs include Cassils, Tony Cokes, Roger Guenveur Smith, Alex Rivera, Patricia Fernández, Austin Young, Poli Marichal, and John Jota Leaños.

Initially focused on video and media art, Freewaves has expanded its programs to include performance art events, live Instagram dialogues, and a free digital video art archive, with its output available online. The organization presents public art, experimental video, and new-media works not typically featured in mass media through a network that includes local and international artists, arts organizations, schools, libraries, cable stations, programmers, and over 2000 video makers. Freewaves has exhibited experimental media art in unconventional venues, such as on Metro buses, traveling “road shows,” cable television, video billboards, libraries, high schools, sidewalks, and public parks.

== Video archive ==
In 2005, Freewaves launched its online video archive as a platform to provide public access to the making, sharing, and exchange of new video art internationally. The Freewaves video archive features over 800 video art pieces from around the globe.

== Festivals and public art projects ==
=== 1st Festival: A Celebration of Independent Video (1989) ===
Freewaves was launched as a three-week festival of art, narrative, documentary and videos at the American Film Institute's National Video Festival in 1989. The first festival included the participation of 35 Los Angeles media and arts organizations, 300 artists, and various curators and involved of screenings, exhibitions, and installations mounted at 30 sites, biweekly cablecasts, panel presentations, and four thematic programs called “Road Shows" across Southern California.

=== 2nd Festival (1991) ===
Freewaves 2nd Celebration of Independent Video (March 1–31, 1991) was a larger festival, convening 100 arts organizations, cable stations, media centers and schools. The festival exhibited 44 thematic programs and 150 videos from high school and college students. The second festival also included artworks of new animation, ranging from computer graphics to personal tapes made on consumer equipment. LA Freewaves collaborated with the Los Angeles Museum of Contemporary Art to organize video screenings for an opening night event and reception, various exhibitions and video screenings throughout Los Angeles, and eight one-hour cablecast programs that aired throughout March.

=== 3rd Festival (1992) ===
Freewaves connected a consortium of arts organizations, cable stations, media centers and schools to present its third decentralized festival of independent video throughout the Los Angeles area from mid-September to mid-October 1992. Curated by 60 independent and affiliated curators, 75 programs of 425 artists were exhibited widely across 29 cable stations and various venues across Los Angeles. The festival coalesced into a broad-based response to the 1992 L.A. Uprising in South-Central Los Angeles, featuring exhibitions and cable programs including “Beyond the Color Line: Reflections on Race”.

=== 4th Festival: "T.V. at Large" (1994) ===
LA Freewaves presented "TV AT LARGE", their 4th celebration of independent video, featuring video projections and live performances on their opening night at the John Anson Ford Amphitheatre. The fourth festival also consisted of five one-hour shows presented at the AFI Video Festival and broadcast on cable television from mid-September to mid-October 1994. The cable TV programs included “Freewaves Cruisin’ the Airwaves”, “Legacies”, “Race, Identity, Sexuality: Unbound Voices”, “All in a Day’s Work”, and “Multi-Boom: Youth Sound Off About Difference”.

Freewaves also received non-profit 501(c)(3) status in 1994, and its first foundation grants. The festival curatorial committee was formalized.

=== 5th Festival: "Private T.V., Public Living Rooms" (1996) ===
Freewaves' 5th independent video and media art festival featured videos, websites, CD-ROMS, and 15 installations by LA artists at art venues and on cable TV throughout Southern California. The works of 140 artists were featured in this festival through programs at 15 art centers and 32 cable stations. The opening was held at the MOCA's Geffen Contemporary.

=== 6th Festival: "All Over the Map" (1998) ===
LA Freewaves 6th Celebration of Independent Video & New Media (September–October 1998) featured screenings at the Museum of Contemporary Art (MOCA), video tour buses linking alternative art spaces and community centers in Southern California, video installations and multi-media performances, outdoor large-scale video billboards on the Sunset Strip, public television programs broadcast on KCET/LA and the L.A. Channel, online exhibits, panels and live presentations. The festival featured work by over 200 international artists. Freewaves also conducted a citywide series of 25 free workshops – “Intro to the Internet” and “Web Design”, targeted to video makers, visual artists, writers and musicians.

=== 7th Festival: "Air Raids" (2000) ===
In 2000, Freewaves hosted Air Raids, a citywide festival of experimental, documentary and new media works by artists, activists and media makers. The seventh festival opening took place at the Museum of Contemporary Art, Los Angeles and featured over 100, thematic video bus tours, "T.V. or Not T.V." a 10-year LA media arts retrospective that aired on KCET, online exhibitions, as well as screenings and installations at multiple Southern California venues.

=== 8th Festival: "T.V. or Not T.V." (2001-2003) ===
In 2001, Freewaves organized three public programs of artist interviews and excerpts, a one-hour compilation of short art videos, and a curriculum guide covering the general principles in media literacy. Programs included: "Voices Unheard: Video artists exploring personal realms outside TVs parameters"; "Access LA: Los Angeles from the perspectives of different media artists and teens"; "New Frontiers: Artists' uses of computers and the internet"; and "TV or Not TV".

Freewaves' 8th festival took place from November 2002 - February 2003 throughout the greater Los Angeles area, featuring 365 artists from 20 countries in 70 shows on public television, video billboards, and digital programs at cyber cafés. "TV or Not TV" included video programs from the U.S., Central and South America, shown at MOCA and the Iturralde Gallery.

=== 9th Festival: "How Can You Resist?" (2004) ===
The ninth festival, "How Can You Resist?" was held in between November 5–27, 2004, with over 150 works of video, film and digital media. Freewaves aimed to engage the public's growing skepticism about commercial media and create a consensus for change beyond the outcome of the 2004 U.S. presidential election. Freewaves expanded its reach to include international submissions from artists in Latin America, Southeast Asia, Africa, China and the Middle East. Themes that emerged through their exhibitions included addiction, sexuality, suffering, security, paranoia, and moral culpability in a time of war.

=== 10th Festival: "Too Much Freedom?" (2006) ===
Curators from 8 different countries selected 150 total works examining freedom, unpacking assumptions about artistic intention, political intelligence, ethical dilemmas and personal desires. Curators included Rodrigo Alonso (Buenos Aires, Argentina); Clare Davies (Cairo, Egypt); Malik Gaines (Los Angeles, Usa); Julie Joyce (Los Angeles, Usa); Inhee Iris Moon (New York, Usa & Seoul, Korea); Bruno Varela (Oaxaca City, Mexico); Fabian Wagmister (Los Angeles, USA & Buenos Aires, Argentina). The festival also featured an exhibition of video works by Oliver Ressler at the Pamona College Museum of Art. Participating organizations included the National Center for the Preservation of Democracy.

=== 11th Festival: "Hollywould..." (2008) ===
During the Great Recession, Freewaves refocused from international to local. For its 11th biennial festival, they organized a "10 Days 10 Blocks" tour along Hollywood Boulevard with media art (projections, screenings, video installations, interactive and mobile media, video and audio podcasts) at stores, bars, clubs, restaurants, windows, sidewalks, public transit, theaters, wifi, online and at LACE that centered around the question: “What could, should, would Hollywood be?"

=== Out the Window (2011-2014) ===
Freewaves commissioned and presented 60 two minute artists’ videos and 75 youth-made videos exploring specific locales throughout Los Angeles County. The videos were presented on 4,400 screens on 2,200 Metro buses. "Out the Window" incorporated GPS technology so that specific banners or notes to riders will be triggered as buses pass through specific neighborhoods. Riders could respond to videos with text messages; videos made by youth, artists and nonprofits that speak about specific places. Freewaves also produced a two-disc DVD set of videos curated around topics ranging from responses to commercial TV news and advertising, to videos about the body and embodiment.

==== Long Live LA (2014) ====
Freewaves received additional funding from the Robert Rauschenberg Foundation to commission videos for "Long Live LA", a series of videos that intended to address the public health crisis facing Los Angeles County. The videos were featured in public transit buses and revolved around issues of heart disease, obesity, lead poisoning, and diabetes. A launch event and public discussion was held at ForYourArt in February 2014, followed by a community screening and panel discussion with the South Pasadena Arts Council. In the Summer of 2014, Freewaves commissioned six new artists to create a second series of health videos for the buses, which explored the topics of mental health, violence and addiction.

=== Lions Tigers And… (2016) ===
From October 2015 through March 2016, "Lions, Tigers, And …" intended to engage Pasadena residents and their relationship with local government and public spaces over a series of discussions, lunch gatherings, and drum circles, all taking place in the City Hall courtyard. The public art project was the first in a year long series called “My Pasadena", produced by City of Pasadena and Side Street Projects and funded by the National Endowment for the Arts.

=== Racial Radical (2019) ===
Racial Radical: Generating New ‘Woke’ Words was a series of public workshops focused on recognizing familiar but so far unnamed racial experiences and generating new vocabulary from those experiences. This project was created with support from the University of Southern California (USC) Visions and Voices: The Arts and Humanities Initiative and Race, Arts and Placemaking (RAP) Initiative. Racial Radical was produced in connection with the Designing Equity initiative.

=== Dis...Miss ===
Dis…Miss was a public art series that engaged the public through videos, postcards, performances, and online. Through a visual, performance 60 L.A. artists participated in dialogues about evolving attitudes toward gender and intersectional feminism. Audience engagement took the form of screenings, workshops, exhibitions, surveys and discussions in Los Angeles, Tehran, Manila, and Graz.

==== Ain't I a Womxn? (2018) ====
In 2018, Freewaves presented Ain’t I A Womxn? at Los Angeles State Historic Park, a public art exhibition that brought together 20 independent artists, collectives, and activists for an evening of performances, screenings, and installations to expand and challenge conceptions of feminism, gender, and intersectionality. The program's title references Sojourner Truth's "Ain’t I A Woman?" speech to an 1851 feminist convocation addressing the exclusion of Black women and women of color from the movement. Participating arts organizations included: ArtworxLA, F.L.O.W. (Feminist Library on Wheels), KCHUNG, Las Fotos, Ni Santas, Reach LA, Self Help Graphics and the Feminist Center for Creative Work.

==== Love and/or Fear: A Celebration of Genders (2019) ====
In 2019, Freewaves continued their Dis..Miss series with "Love and/or Fear" an multi-site participatory event that brought together over 35 artists, art collectives, and organizations to celebrate intersectional gender identities building community and launching a "SEXUAL HARASSMENT FREE ZONE" in partnership with the organization Peace Over Violence. The event featured works by 20 local artists including Catherine Bell, Reanne Estrada, Arshia Haq, Cassils, Young Joon Kwak, Thinh Nguyen, Ni Santas, Dakota Noot, and Yozmit.

==== Dis...Miss Gender? (2023) ====
Freewaves will be releasing a book through MIT Press in October 2023. Titled after their 2019 public art series, "Dis...Miss Gender?" compiles a series photographs and short essays in which artists, writers, and theorists investigate and celebrate the rapidly evolving world of gender. Essay contributors to the book include gender theorists Karen Tongson, Amelia Jones, and Tiffany E. Barber. The book also features commentary from Los Angeles–based artists, viewers, and organizations.

=== XaMENing Masculinities ===
On October 6, 2022, LA Freewaves hosted X-aMEN-ing Masculinities, a public art exhibition that examined masculinity from a wide range of perspectives through video, performance art, and installations by Paul Donald, rafa esparza, d. Sabela grimes, Asher Hartman, Sarah Johnson, Sean Milan, Phranc, José Guadalupe Sanchez, Austin Young, Cassils, Patty Chang, Tony Cokes, Shaun Leonardo, Kenneth Tam; and visual art by Alex Donis. Curated by Anne Bray, Marcus Kuiland-Nazario and Anuradha Vikram, the exhibition also incorporated a "MASC4MASK House Ball", an artistic exhibition of masculinity within the House/Ballroom community, hosted by Season 1 winner of HBO's Legendary, Torie Balmain.

=== Heal Hear Here (2023) ===
On May 20, 2023, Freewaves hosted a free event centered on collective healing through art at Los Angeles State Historic Park. The event coincided with Mental Health Awareness Month and was funded by the Los Angeles Department of Mental Health. The public gathering featured Indigenous-informed opening and closing ceremonies, an ancestral walking tour, a labyrinth with listening, participatory art workshops, live music, poetry readings, and performance art. Partnering organizations from across Los Angeles included Metabolic Studio, LA Artcore, GYOPO, Armory Center for the Arts, LA River Public Art Project, artworxLA, the Museum of Jurassic Technology, Self Help Graphics & Art, Project 1521 and UCLArts & Healing.

== Additional programming ==
=== Youth media programs (1994) ===
Freewaves shifted its efforts to exposing youth to video art making by compiling a catalog of Southern California Youth Media Programs for emerging/young artists to connect with one another. The catalog, listed the names of media distributors across Los Angeles, and participating artists and video projects of media arts programs throughout Southern California. Media arts programs represented in the catalog included artist residency programs in schools, youth centers, hospitals, and teacher-initiated programs. Technical support of program was provided by VIDKIDCO and the Long Beach Museum of Art.

=== Libraries and high schools (1995–1997) ===
In 1995 and 1997, L.A. Freewaves had librarians and teachers repackage the latest festivals into exhibitions for Los Angeles's 74 major public libraries and 40 public high schools. Teachers of language arts, social studies, American studies and interdisciplinary teams selected subjects such as immigration, racism, gender formation and labor issues.

=== Open Studio/LA (1999) ===
In partnership with On Ramp and Visual Communications, Freewaves launched Open Studio/LA, a series of free workshops on internet and web design, an online residency for LA artists and arts organizations, and a lecture series with critiques by web artists and designers.

=== Black Box TV (2004) ===
Freewaves launched its first ever TV show. The TV pilot followed four Los Angeles based artists as they contend with the world that lies outside of the artist's studio.

=== Hotbed (2008) ===
Hotbed was a video installation and event in collaboration with the Getty Program. Videos were projected on the exterior walls of the Getty Center, 21 artists' videos from explored the theme of the body as nature or culture.

=== Video on the loose: Freewaves and 20 years of media arts (2010) ===
Freewaves celebrated its 20th anniversary by expanding its video archive showcasing 400 works from past festivals. The new site included a web version of Freewaves’ 20th anniversary publication, Freewaves Video on the Loose and Twenty Years of Media Arts, with essays, interviews, and an accompanying program of video work from the previous twenty years of Freewaves festivals.
