= Williams College Museum of Art =

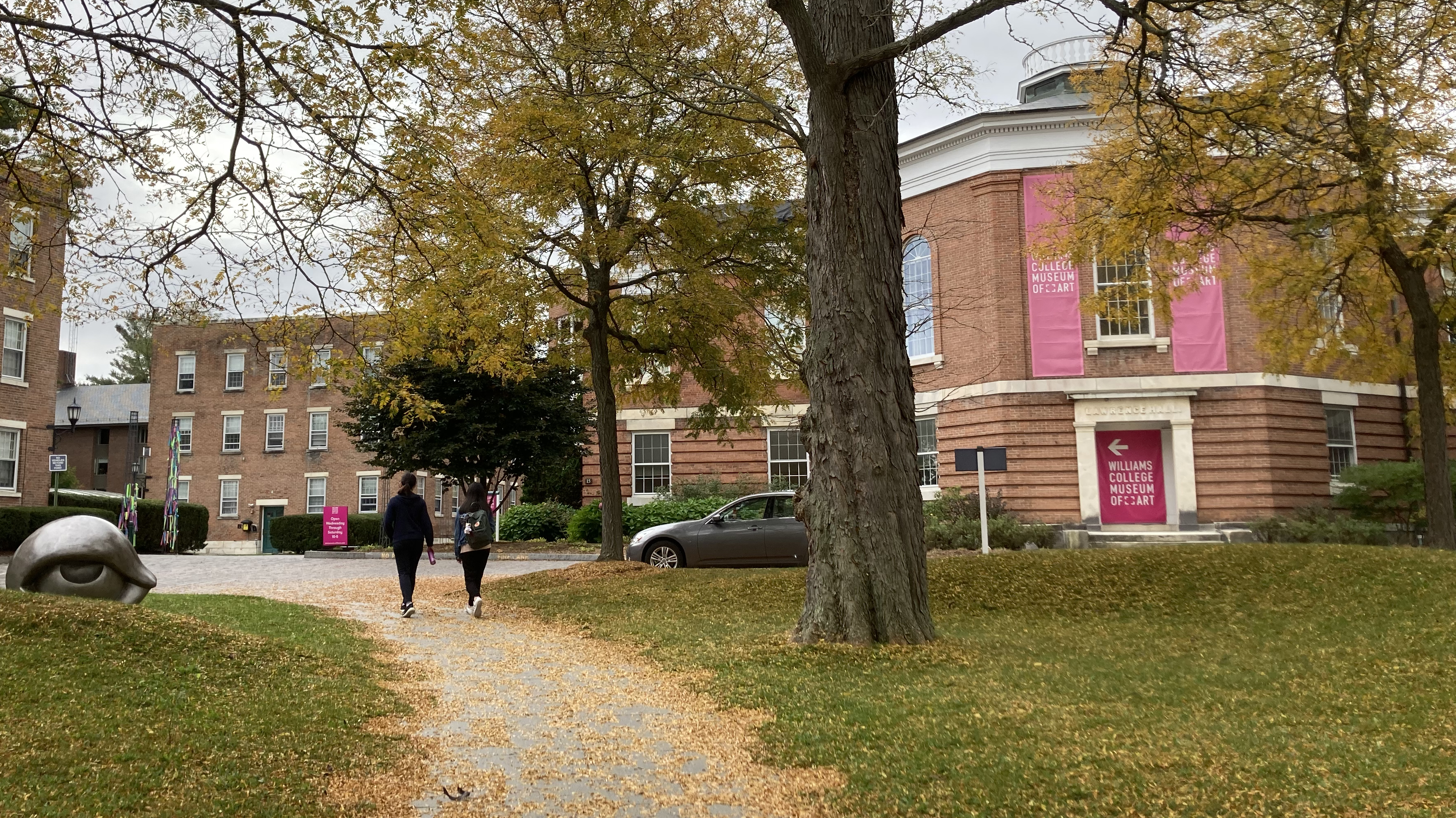
- The Williams College Museum of Art
- Established: 1926
- Location: 76 Spring St., Williamstown, Massachusetts
- Coordinates: 42°42′40.27″N 73°12′9.69″W
- Type: Art museum
- Accreditation: American Alliance of Museums, 1993, 2004, 2020
- Collections: Contemporary art, photography, prints, Indian painting
- Collection size: 15,000
- Founder: Karl Weston
- Director: Pamela Franks
- Website: artmuseum.williams.edu

The Williams College Museum of Art (WCMA) is a college-affiliated art museum in Williamstown, Massachusetts. It is located on the Williams College campus, close to the Massachusetts Museum of Contemporary Art (MASS MoCA) and the Clark Art Institute. Its growing collection encompasses more than 14,000 works, with particular strengths in contemporary art, photography, prints, and Indian painting. The museum is free and open to the public.

== History ==
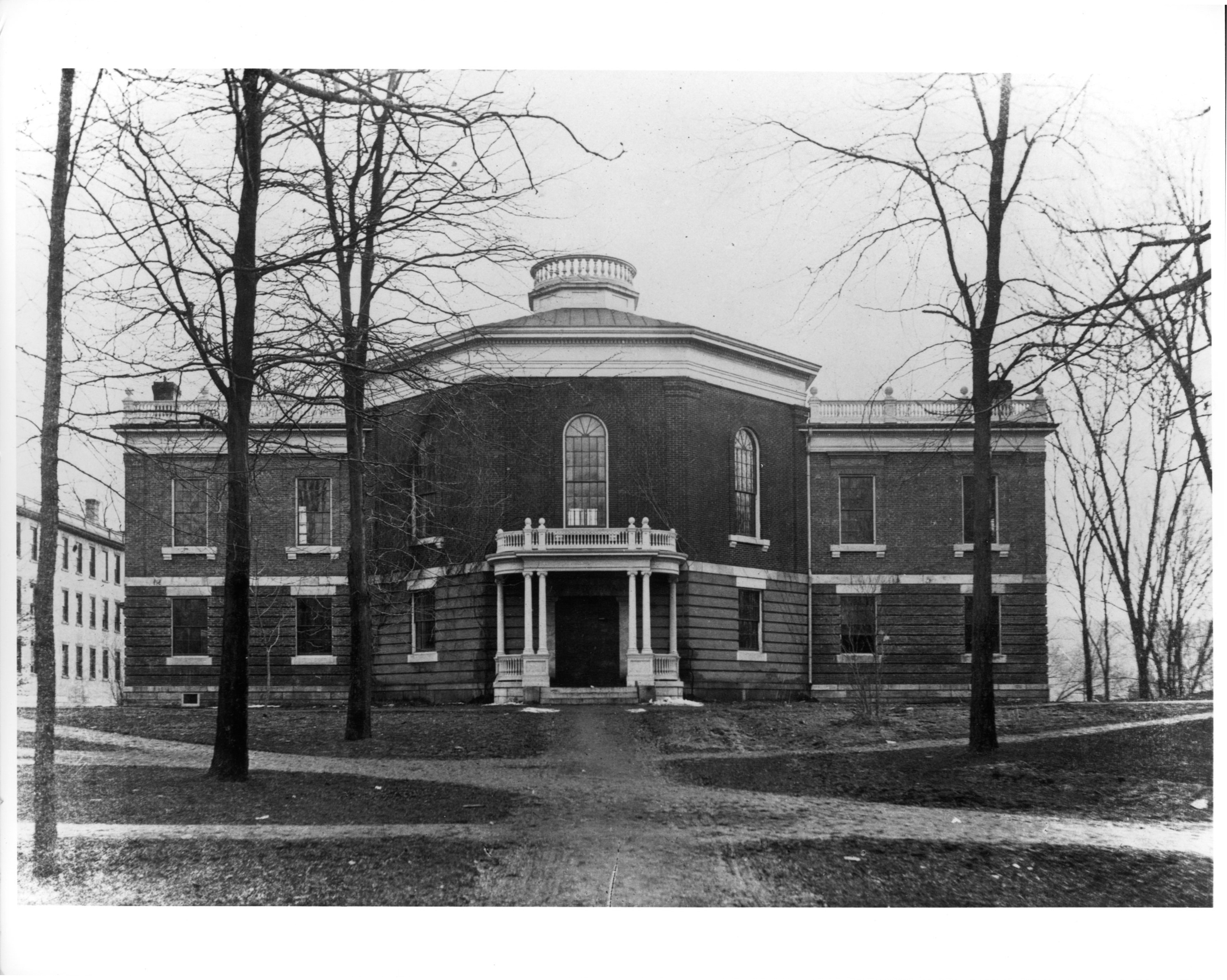
Lawrence Hall, soon to house Williams College Museum of Art, before the addition of the two wings designed by Francis R. Allen in 1890

WCMA was established in 1926 by Karl Weston, an art history professor who made it his mission to provide students with a place to experience art directly, rather than as slides or in textbooks. The college's art collection, in large part donated by Eliza Peters Field in 1897, had been housed in two small wings of what was then the college library, Lawrence Hall, designed by Thomas A. Tefft in 1846. When the library was moved to Stetson Hall in 1920, Weston transformed the octagonal brick building into an art museum, adding a T-shaped wing in order to provide additional space for galleries and the college's rapidly expanding art history curriculum.

Over the next half-century, under a series of directors, the college enlarged the art department and the museum's collection. In 1981, Director Franklin W. Robinson hired Charles Moore to redesign the building in order to raise facilities to professional standards and double exhibition space. This coincided with an expansion of WCMA's staff, educational programs, and exhibition schedule.

Accredited by the American Alliance of Museums in 1993, and re-accredited in 2004, the museum has been the site of dozens of exhibitions (see Past Exhibitions, below). In 2012, Williams College hired director Christina Olsen, who served through August 2017, before leaving to become the director of the University of Michigan Museum of Art (UMMA). In May 2018, the college named Pamela Franks, Senior Deputy Director and Seymour H. Knox Jr., Curator of Modern and Contemporary Art at the Yale University Art Gallery to be WCMA's new Class of 1956 Director.

In the summer of 2019, WCMA temporarily closed its doors for a series of renovations. While the museum was closed, WCMA exhibited 40 works of art from its Williams Art Loan for Living Spaces (WALLS) collection in a gallery space called Summer Space at 76 Spring St.

== Collection ==
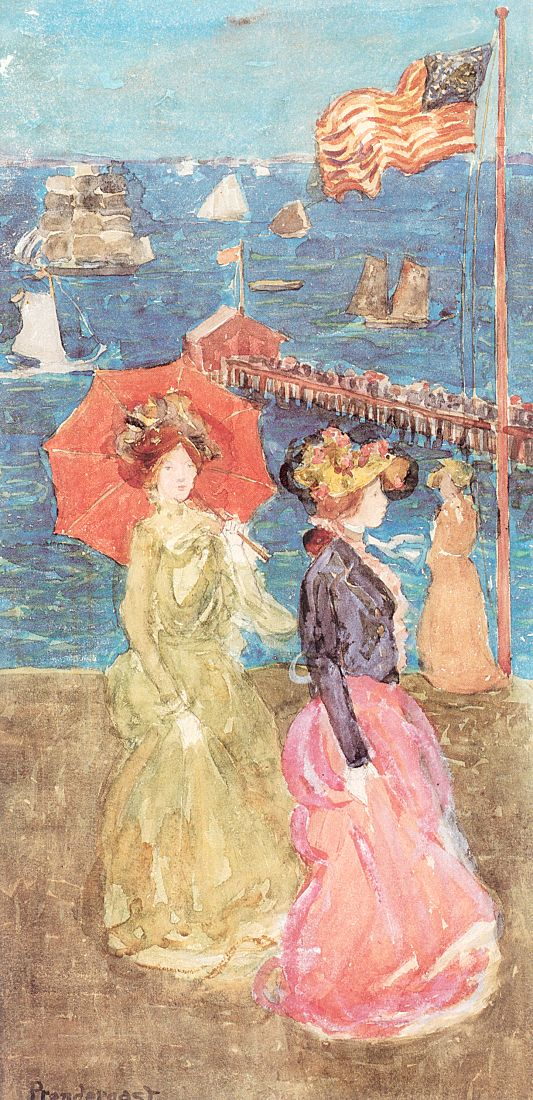
Maurice Prendergast, Figures Under the Flag (1900–1905)

Made up of 15,000 individual works, the collection has particular strengths in ancient Egyptian, Assyrian, and Greco-Roman objects, Indian Painting, African Sculpture, American photography, American art, and international modern and contemporary art. The museum is also home to the world's largest assembly of works by the artist brothers Maurice Prendergast and Charles Prendergast. These works were donated in 1983 by Charles's widow Eugenie Prendergast. They were the basis for WCMA's Prendergast Archive and Study Center, which is maintained as a center for scholarship on the brothers and their contemporaries.

Marking its 75th anniversary in 2001, the museum installed Eyes (Nine Elements) by Louise Bourgeois. This outdoor sculpture has since become a symbol of the museum's dedication to contemporary art, as well as an iconic part of the Williams campus.

=== Notable artworks ===
- Morning in a City, 1944, Edward Hopper
- Manhattan Memo, 2015, Barkley L. Hendricks
- Eyes (Nine Elements), Louise Bourgeois
- A commissioned wall painting by Sol LeWitt
- Moonrise, Hernandez, New Mexico, 1941, Ansel Adams
- Death on the Ridge Road, 1935, Grant Wood
- Lisa Lyon, 1981, Robert Mapplethorpe
- Piss Elegance, 1987, Andres Serrano
- Jerome, 2014, Titus Kaphar
- more than 400 watercolors, oils, and sketches by Charles and Maurice Prendergast
- relief of a guardian spirit from the Assyrian Palace at Nimrud, 9th century BCE
- multiple sketches and watercolors from the ongoing series Slavery Reparations Acts, Kara Walker
- Situation VI-Pisces 4, 1972, Sam Gilliam

== Fulkerson Fund for Leadership in the Arts ==
Established by Allan W. Fulkerson '54, the Fund is now in its fifth year and continues to support a variety of student-centered projects at WCMA. Central components include:

- WALLS (see below)
- Think Tank
- The annual Leadership in the Arts Award is presented to one graduating Master's and one College student. This award recognizes graduates who are poised to become future arts leaders. Winners are awarded a fully funded trip to meet with a prominent alumni arts leader and an American Alliance of Museums membership.

== Monuments Men ==
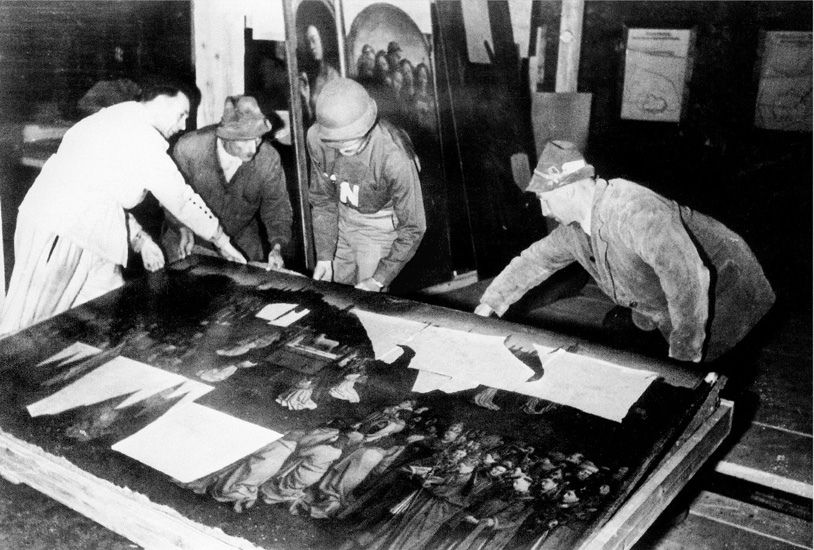
American military men removing the van Eyck's Ghent Altarpiece from the Altaussee salt mine, 1945

During World War 2, a group of nearly 350 servicemen and women was established to recover and protect artwork from areas affected by the conflict. This organization was known as the Monuments, Fine Arts, and Archives program (MFAA), or more colloquially, the Monuments Men. Among the ranks of this enterprise were Williams graduates Charles Parkhurst '35 and Lane Faison '29, who both returned to WCMA to serve as museum directors after the war. In February 2014, Sony Pictures released The Monuments Men, a feature film directed by George Clooney that has revived interest in these lesser-known heroes of the war. On March 7, 2014, WCMA celebrated its own two Monuments Men by inviting Faison's sons and Parkhurst's widow to speak at the museum.

== Williams Art Mafia ==
This informal group studied under the trio of Lane Faison, Bill Pierson and Whitney Stoddard, and became collectively known as the Williams Art Mafia. Its members include:

- Roger Mandle '63, former president of the Rhode Island School of Design
- James N. Wood '63, former director of the Art Institute of Chicago and head of the J. Paul Getty trust
- Earl A. Powell III '66, director of the National Gallery of Art (until 2019) and chairman of the US Commission of Fine Arts
- John R. "Jack" Lane '66, president of the New Art Trust
- Kirk Varnedoe '67, former curator of painting and sculpture at the Museum of Modern Art
- Thomas Krens '69, former director of the Solomon R. Guggenheim Foundation
- Glenn Lowry '76, director of the Museum of Modern Art.

== Major past exhibitions ==
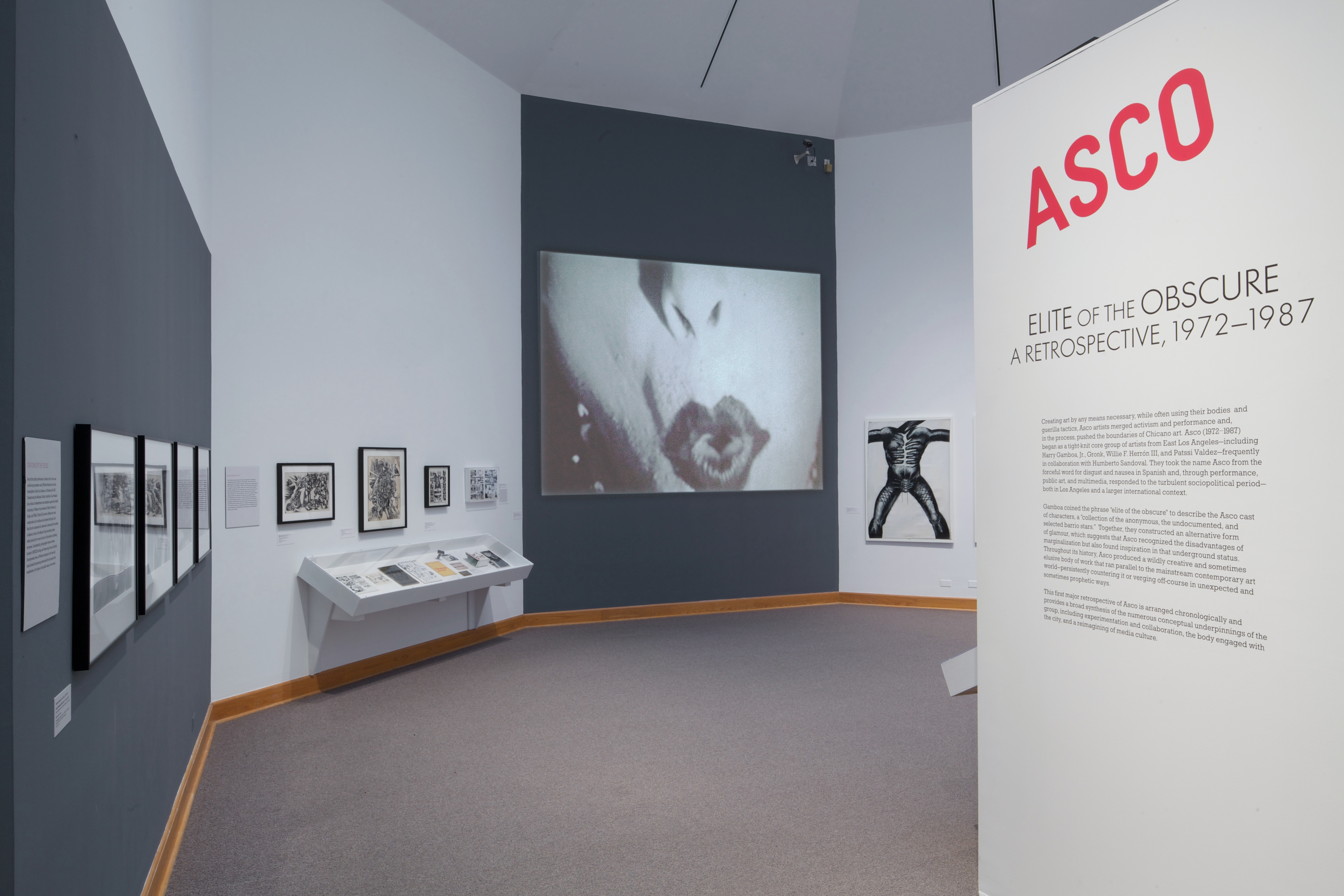
Asco: Elite of the Obscure, A Retrospective, 1972–1987

- Carrie Mae Weems: The Hampton Project (2000) – In this installation, part of the museum's permanent collection, Carrie Mae Weems combines her concerns about individual identity, class, assimilation, education, and the legacy of slavery into a series of photographic banners that encouraged viewers to reassess their own moral and ethical boundaries, as well as the political and socioeconomic realities of twentieth-century America.
- Prelude to a Nightmare: Art, Politics, and Hitler's Early Years in Vienna, 1906–1913 (2002) – This exhibition examined the influence Vienna, Austria had on the young Adolf Hitler and how this influence was later manifested in his creation of the Nazi party. The exhibition was WCMA's contribution to The Vienna Project (2002), a collaboration among eleven arts and cultural institutions in the Berkshires that explored four centuries of art from the Austrian art mecca.
- Moving Pictures: American Art and Early Film, 1890–1910 (2005) – This exhibition explored the relationship between American art and the new medium of film at the beginning of the 20th century. Showcasing approximately 100 paintings and 50 films, "Moving Pictures" presented art and film side by side, examining the complex relationship between these two media at the turn of the last century.
- Beautiful Suffering: Photography and the Traffic in Pain (2006) – This exhibition of photographs drawn from contemporary art, advertising, and photojournalism, explores the ethics and aesthetics involved in depicting human suffering.
- Making It New: The Art and Style of Sara and Gerald Murphy (2007) – Sara and Gerald Murphy are best remembered as the captivating American 'expats' who inspired F. Scott Fitzgerald's Tender Is the Night. This exhibition, however, examined the two as forces in their own right who helped drive the modernist movement of the 1920s.
- Crumpled Butterflies and Borrowed Words: A Long Overdue Love Letter to Andy (2007)- Alex Donis is queer, Latinx visual artist who is known for creating homoerotic imagery.
- Asco: Elite of the Obscure, A Retrospective, 1972–1987 (2012) – The first retrospective to present the wide-ranging work of the Chicano performance and conceptual art group Asco. Asco began as a tight-knit core group of artists from East Los Angeles composed of Harry Gamboa Jr., Gronk, Willie Herrón, and Patssi Valdez. Taking their name from the forceful Spanish word for disgust and nausea, Asco used performance, public art, and multimedia to respond to social and political turbulence in Los Angeles and beyond.
- Possible selves: queer foto vernaculars, (2018–1019) - curated by Horace D. Ballard this was the first major exhibition to chart two cultural phenomena: the contemporary evolution of portrait photography in the era of to social media and the evolution of queer identity from one of desire to one of radical community and political dissent. Included works from the WCMA collections alongside a significant "Stack" from Felix Gonzalez-Torres and the loan of 256 Instagram images from image-posters and image-makers from 22 countries. In its rigor, scope, and fierce inclusion of hundreds of black and brown bodies from around the globe, "possible selves" references the Family of Man photo exhibition at the MoMA, organized by Edward Steichen in 1955–56.

== List of directors (1926–present) ==
| Director | From | To |
|---|---|---|
| Karl E. Weston | 1926 | 1948 |
| S. Lane Faison | 1948 | 1976 |
| Whitney Stoddard | 1960 | 1961 |
| Franklin W. Robinson | 1976 | 1979 |
| Milo C. Beach | 1979 | 1979 |
| John W. Coffey II | 1979 | 1980 |
| Thomas Krens | 1980 | 1988 |
| Charles Parkhurst | 1983 | 1984 |
| W. Rod Faulds | 1988 | 1989 |
| Linda B. Shearer | 1989 | 2004 |
| Marion M. Goethals | 2004 | 2005 |
| Lisa Corrin | 2005 | 2011 |
| Katy Kline | 2011 | 2012 |
| Christina Olsen | 2012 | 2017 |
| Lisa Dorin | 2017 | 2018 |
| Pamela Franks | 2018 | present |
