= Paul Hayes Tucker =

American art historian

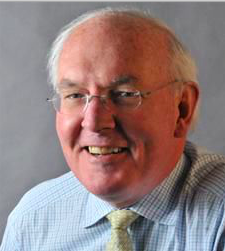
- Born: 1950 (age 75–76); New York City
- Occupations: Art historian, professor, curator, author
- Spouse: Maggie Moss-Tucker
- Website: UMB faculty page

Paul Hayes Tucker (born 1950) is an American art historian, professor, curator, and author. He is regarded as the world’s leading expert on Claude Monet (1840-1926) and an authority on French Impressionism. He spent 36 years teaching at the University of Massachusetts Boston, with visiting professorships at Williams College, The Institute of Fine Arts, NYU, and the University of California Santa Barbara. He has curated major Monet and Impressionist exhibitions at the Museum of Fine Arts, Boston, The Art Institute of Chicago, the Royal Academy of Arts, London, the National Gallery, Washington, The Wadsworth, the Artizon Museum, Tokyo, the Nagoya City Art Museum, and the Hiroshima Museum, among other institutions. He has also authored or edited 11 books.

== Early life ==
Tucker was born in New York City. He grew up in Pelham, New York. Inspired by his grandfather Carlton J. H. Hayes, Seth Low Professor of History at Columbia University and United States Ambassador to Spain during World War II, Tucker attended Williams College believing he would be a history major. The shift to art history came while studying under renowned Williams art history professors S. Lane Faison, Whitney Stoddard, and William Pierson, as well as spending a junior year summer in Florence taking art history courses in a program run by the University of Michigan and Sarah Lawrence College. His career trajectory was confirmed by his frequent visits to the Clark Art Institute during his senior year at Williams and a year-long NEH fellowship at the Toledo Museum of Art in Ohio that he was awarded after graduation.

As a graduate of Williams, he was a member of the so-called "Williams Mafia", a legendary group of art historians who matriculated from the college in the 1960s and 1970s and went on to become directors of major museums across America. Tucker also played football and rugby at Williams becoming a Little All-American offensive tackle in 1971.

From the Toledo Museum of Art, he went to Yale, where he earned his PhD in the History of Art in 1979. Tucker studied primarily under Robert L. Herbert, a leading modernist scholar who was responsible for advancing the discipline as a social art historian. Tucker's dissertation on Monet’s classic Impressionist paintings of the 1870s, Monet at Argenteuil, 1871-1878, was the first study of the artist that set his work in a social-political context. It became his first book. (Yale University Press, 1982.)

== Exhibitions ==
Tucker set the attendance record at the Museum of Fine Arts, Boston in 1990 with Monet in the '90s. The Series Paintings, which attracted 530,000 visitors, only to break his own record with Monet in the 20th Century in 1998 which drew 565,000. Both shows also broke records in London when they were at the Royal Academy of Arts. Monet in the 90s attracted 658,00 visitors in 1990. Monet in the 20th Century counted 813,000 in 1999 which made it the most visited exhibition in British history at the time. The catalogue for the exhibition sold over 125,000 copies, the most illustrated books Yale University Press had ever printed. His Monet. A Retrospective at the Bridgestone Museum (now Artizon Museum), Tokyo, Nagoya City Art Museum, and Hiroshima Museum was the second most visited show in Japan in 1995. Monet's Garden. Impressions of Giverny, which he curated for The New York Botanical Garden (May 19 – October 22, 2012), also broke records there. Other noteworthy shows Tucker curated include:

- Claude Monet. Late Work. Gagosian Gallery, New York, May–June 2010 (which won the International Critic’s Award for Best One Person Exhibition at a commercial gallery in New York)
- DoubleTake. From Monet to Lichtenstein. Selections from the Paul G. Allen Collection. Experience Music Project, Seattle, April 2006 – January 2007.
- The Sculpture of William Tucker. State Street, Santa Barbara, CA, January–June 2002.
- Renoir. From Outsider to Old Master, 1870–1992. Bridgestone Museum, Tokyo, and Nagoya City Art Museum, Nagoya, February–June 2001.
- The Impressionists at Argenteuil. National Gallery of Art, Washington, and The Wadsworth, Hartford, May–December 2000.
- Monet in the 20th-Century. Museum of Fine Arts, Boston and Royal Academy of Arts, London, September 1998 – April 1999.
- Claude Monet. A Retrospective. Bridgestone Museum, Tokyo, Nagoya City Art Museum, and Hiroshima Museum of Art, February–July 1994.
- Tuscany Rediscovered: Richard Upton at Cortona. Everson Museum, Syracuse, N.Y., Krannert Art Gallery, Champaign-Urbana, IL, The New Britain Museum of American Art, New Britain, CT, and James A. Mitchner Museum, Doylestown, PA, May 1991 – June 1993.
- Monet in the 90s. The Series Paintings. Museum of Fine Arts, Boston, The Art Institute of Chicago, and Royal Academy of Arts, London, February–December 1990.
- Masterworks from the Collection of Mr. & Mrs. David Lloyd Kreeger. Corcoran Museum of Art, Washington, D.C., February–May 1989.
- Architectural Drawings for Modern Publish Buildings in New Haven. Yale University Art Gallery, New Haven, CT, 1974.
- The Cubist Image in the Graphic Arts. Yale University Art Gallery, New Haven, CT, 1973.
- Death: Realism, Allegory, Ritual. Toledo Museum of Art, OH, 1973.

== Selected publications ==
- Tucker, Paul Hayes (2011). Kenneth Noland 1958–1967. New York: Mitchell-Innes and Nash. ISBN 978-0-9814578-7-1.
- Tucker, Paul Hayes (2010). Claude Monet, Late Work. New York: Gagosian Gallery. ISBN 978-1-935263-11-1.
- Tucker, Paul Hayes; Brettell, Richard; Lee, Natalie (2010). The Robert Lehman Collection at the Metropolitan Museum of Art, Volume III: Nineteenth- and Twentieth-Century Paintings. Princeton: Princeton University Press. ISBN 9781588393494.
- Tucker, Paul Hayes (2005). DoubleTake. From Monet to Lichtenstein. Selections from the Paul G. Allen Collection. Seattle: Experience Music Project. ISBN 978-0977909407.
- Tucker, Paul Hayes (2000). The Impressionists at Argenteuil. Washington, D.C.: The National Gallery of Art with Yale University Press. ISBN 978-0894682490.
- Tucker, Paul Hayes (1998). Monet in the 20th Century. London: Yale University Press with the Museum of Fine Arts, Boston and the Royal Academy of Arts - French edition, Flammarion, 1999. German edition, 1999. ISBN 978-0300079449.
- Tucker, Paul Hayes, ed. (1998). Manet's "Le Déjeuner sur l'herbe". London: Cambridge University Press. ISBN 978-0521479844.
- Tucker, Paul Hayes (1995). Claude Monet. Life and Art. New Haven, CT: Yale University Press. ISBN 978-0300062984.
- Tucker, Paul Hayes (1990). Richard Upton and the Rhetoric of Landscape. Utica, NY: Brodock Press. ISBN 978-0962950315.
- Tucker, Paul Hayes (1990). Monet in the 90s: The Series Paintings. London: Yale University Press with the Museum of Fine Arts, Boston and the Royal Academy of Arts - French edition, Flammarion, 1999. German edition, 1999, Italian Edition, Yale University Press 1990. ISBN 978-0300046595.
- Tucker, Paul Hayes (1982). Monet at Argenteuil. New Haven, CT: Yale University Press, French edition, Editions du Valhermeil, 1990 and 2010. ISBN 978-0300025774.

== Honors and awards ==
- International Art Critics’ Award for curating the best exhibition (Claude Monet. Late Work) at a commercial gallery in New York City, 2010
- Chancellor's Award for Distinguished Scholarship, UMass Boston, 1999, 1991
- Chancellor's Award for Distinguished Service, UMass Boston, 1991
- Governors’ Award, Yale University Press, 1990 (given by the Board of Governors of Yale University Press for the best book the Press published by an author under 40 years old)
- The Florence Gould Arts Foundation Grant, 1988, 1984
- UMass Boston Faculty Development Grant, 1988, 1981, 1980
- UMass Boston Healy Grant, 1988
- UMass Boston Public Service Grant, 1988
- American Council of Learned Societies Grant, 1985
- Danforth Foundation Associate for Excellence in College Teaching, 1981
- UMass Boston Faculty/Staff Union Grant, 1981
- Samuel H. Kress Foundation Fellowship, 1976–1977
- Samuel H. Kress Foundation Travel Grant, 1975, 1976
- Toledo Museum of Art Fellowship for Advanced Study, 1973–1974
- Toledo Museum of Art, Educational Fellowship, 1972–1973

== Personal life ==
He is married to Maggie Moss-Tucker, and has two children, actor Jonathan Tucker and Jennie Taylor Tucker. Tucker retired from his position at UMass Boston to move to California in 2014, where he continues to work in the area of 19th and 20th century art. He is presently working on a college textbook on modern art titled Never Neutral. Modern Art: Courbet to Pollock.
