= Marichal =

Marichal is a Spanish surname originating in the 16th century. Notable people with the surname include:

- Joseph Marichal (1877–1916), French professor and survivor of RMS Lusitania
- Juan Marichal (born 1937), Dominican baseball player
- Kalimba Marichal (born 1982), Mexican singer and actor
- Edmundo Marichal, Chilean aviation pioneer
- Poli Marichal, Puerto Rican artist
- Nicolás Marichal, Uruguayan football player
