= Whitney Stoddard =

American art historian

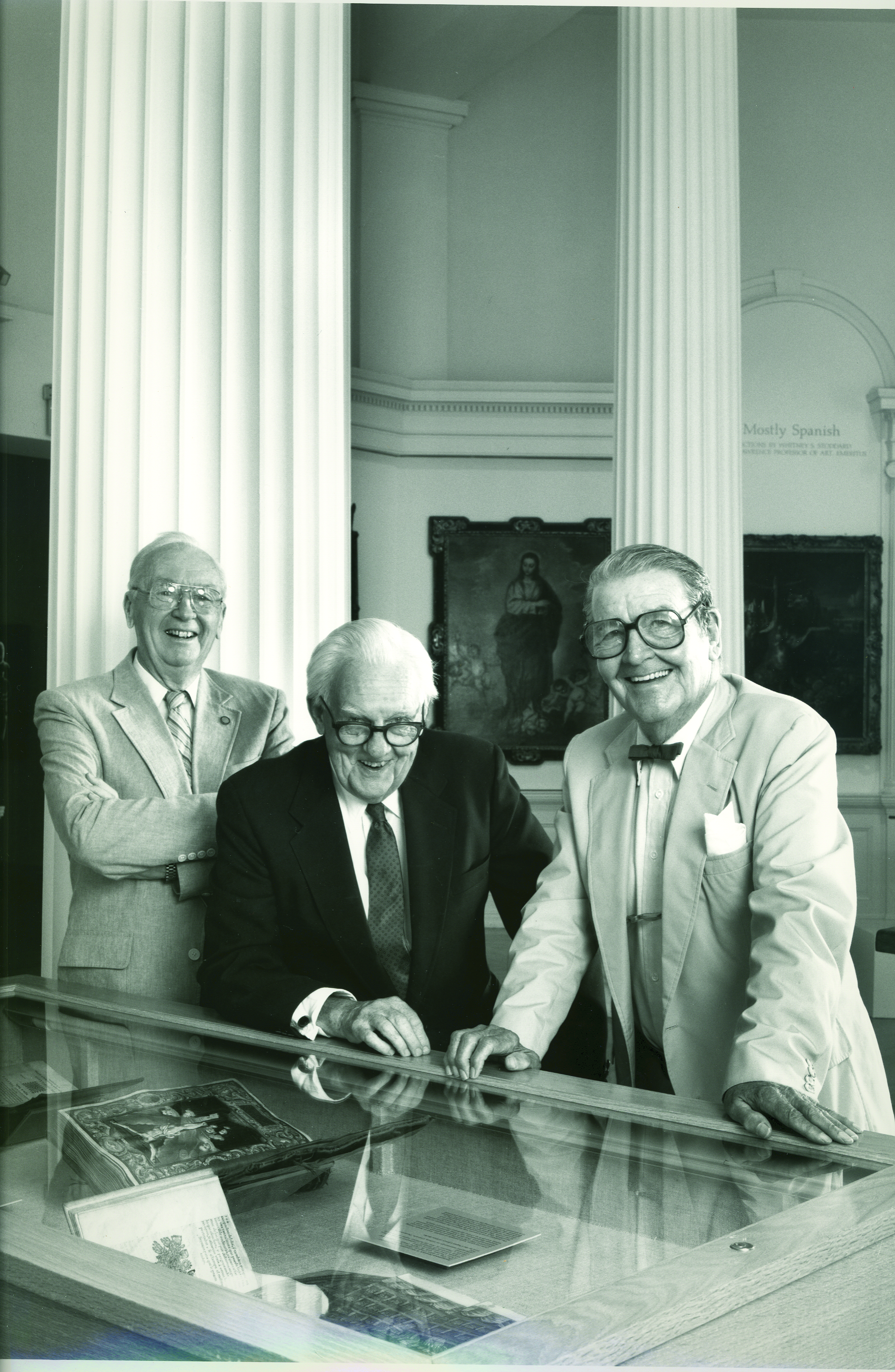
Whitney Stoddard (right) with colleagues S. Lane Faison (center) and William Pierson, Jr. (left) in the Rotunda of the Williams College Museum of Art

Whitney Snow Stoddard (March 25, 1913 – April 2, 2003) was an American art historian who specialized in medieval art.

Born in Greenfield, Massachusetts, Stoddard studied art history at Williams College under the direction of Karl Weston, the charismatic chair of Williams's art department and museum. Upon graduation in 1935, Stoddard decided to pursue his interests in art history by entering a doctoral program at Harvard University, where he worked with Chandler Post and Wilhelm Koehler on the sculpture of Chartres Cathedral. He returned to Williams to teach art history in 1938, and, except a brief hiatus when he served in the Navy during World War II, taught at Williams for the rest of his career.

In 1966, Stoddard authored what soon became the standard textbook for the study of medieval art, Monastery and Cathedral in France (later Art and Architecture in Medieval France). Yet Stoddard prioritized his undergraduate teaching throughout his career at Williams. Alongside colleagues S. Lane Faison and William Pierson, Jr., he trained a new generation of art history students at Williams for careers as art historians and museum curators. Collectively known as the Williams Art Mafia, these included Earl A. Powell III of the National Gallery of Art in Washington DC, Glenn D. Lowry of the Museum of Modern Art in New York, James N. Wood of the Art Institute of Chicago and the J. Paul Getty Trust and Thomas Krens of the Guggenheim Museum in New York. Under his leadership, the Williams art history program developed into one of the finest undergraduate curricula in the country.

In 1989, the College Art Association honored him with a Distinguished Teaching Award. To thank him for his pioneering work on St. Gilles and St. Trophime cathedrals, the French city of Arles gave him the honorary key to their city.

Stoddard died, aged 90, in Williamstown, Massachusetts.

== Publications ==
Stoddard, Whitney S. The West Portals of Saint-Denis and Chartres. Cambridge: Harvard University Press, 1952.

Stoddard, Whitney S. Adventure in Architecture: Building the New Saint John's. London: Longmans, Green, & Co., 1958.

Stoddard, Whitney S. Art and Architecture in Medieval France: Medieval Architecture, Sculpture, Stained Glass, Manuscripts, the Art of the Church Treasuries. New York: Harper & Row, 1972.

Stoddard, Whitney S. The Facade of Saint-Gilles-du-Gard: Its Influence on French Sculpture. Middletown, Conn.: Wesleyan University Press, 1973.

Stoddard, Whitney S. Sculptors of the West Portals of Chartres Cathedral: Their Origins in Romanesque and Their Role in Chartrain Sculpture: Including The West Portals of Saint-Denis and Chartres. New York: W.W. Norton and Company, 1987.
