= View from Rouelles =

Painting by Claude Monet

- Vue prise à Rouelles (French)
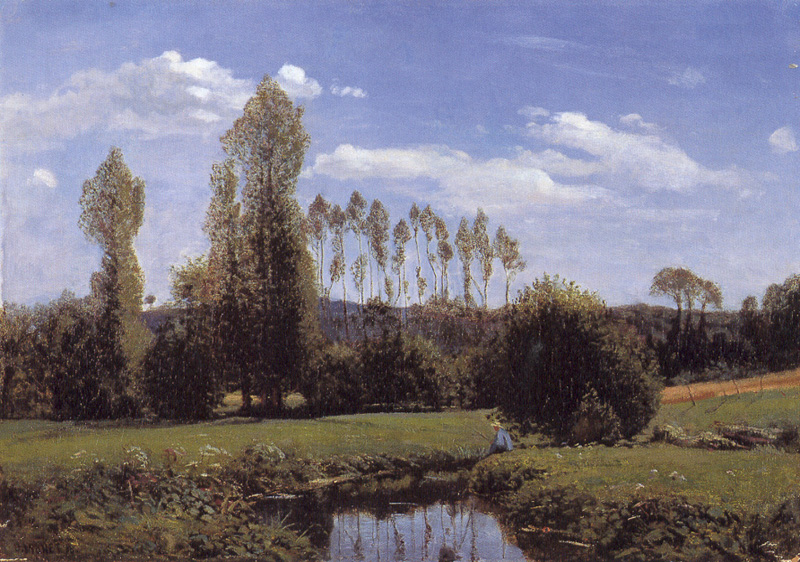
- Artist: Claude Monet
- Year: 1858
- Medium: Oil on canvas
- Movement: Barbizon School
- Dimensions: 46 cm × 65 cm (18 in × 26 in)
- Location: Private collection, Japan

View from Rouelles (Note: Also known as View at Rouelles, View of Rouelles, or other similar variations.) is an 1858 painting by Claude Monet. The painting depicts the landscape surrounding a small stream, either the Rouelles or the Lézarde, in the Rouelles district of Le Havre in Normandy, France. Painted when Monet was seventeen, it is the earliest known painting by the artist. The painting is signed "O. Monet", as it was painted before Oscar-Claude Monet dropped the 'Oscar' from his name in his early twenties.

== Background ==
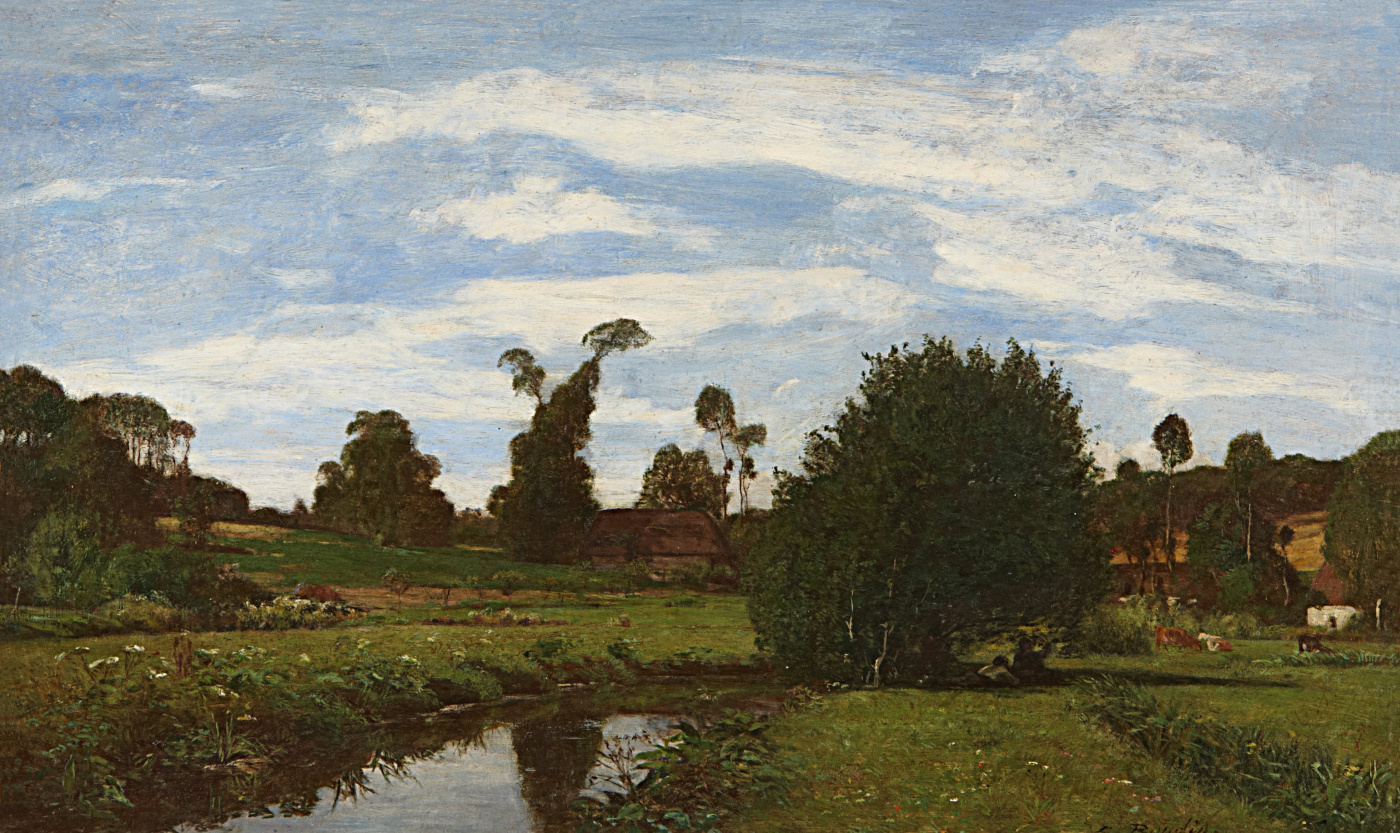
A painting of the same scene by Eugène Boudin, Monet's mentor. c. 1857-58.

As a teenager, Oscar-Claude Monet became known in Le Havre as a caricaturist. To promote his drawings, he exhibited them at Gravier's, a local stationary and framing shop. In the shop, hung above Monet's drawings, were seascape paintings by a local painter named Eugène Boudin. Monet disliked Boudin's paintings; he considered them "disgusting" and hated the artist without ever having met him. The owner of the shop happened to be friends with Boudin and offered to introduce Monet to him, but Monet avoided such a meeting. One day, Monet entered the shop without realizing that Boudin was there, and the two were introduced. Boudin praised Monet's caricatures and encouraged Monet to learn how to draw and paint landscapes.

Boudin, who was fifteen years Monet's senior, became the seventeen-and-a-half-year-old Monet's first painting instructor. In the early summer of 1858, probably just a few months after Monet's first meeting Boudin, the two went on a painting expedition into Montgeon forest in Rouelles, on the north-east side of Le Havre. It was on this expedition that Monet first gained an appreciation for nature. The young Monet watched as Boudin painted, and painted View from Rouelles following Boudin's instructions. View from Rouelles was likely not Monet's first attempt at painting, however, as the painting is far too sophisticated and refined to have been his first attempt.

== Exhibition history ==
In August 1858, Monet submitted View from Rouelles to an exhibition in Le Havre and was accepted. Two of Boudin's paintings, both titled Landscape (vallée de Rouelles) were shown at the same exhibition. After being exhibited in Rouen, a local critic scathingly compared the painting to those of Boudin, writing that Monet's painting had the same qualities as those painted by Boudin. Monet took the comment as a compliment.

In 2019, View from Rouelles was featured in an exhibition titled Claude Monet: The Truth of Nature at the Denver Art Museum in Denver, Colorado. It was displayed next to a painting of the same scene by Eugène Boudin.

== See also ==
- List of paintings by Claude Monet

== Bibliography ==
- Tucker, Paul Hayes (1995). Claude Monet: Life and Art. New Haven & London: Yale University Press. ISBN 0-300-06298-2.
- Wildenstein, Daniel (1999). Monet, or The Triumph of Impressionism. Vol. I (Revised ed.). Köln: Taschen, Wildenstein Institute. ISBN 3-8228-7060-9.
- Wildenstein, Daniel (1996). Monet: Catalogue Raisonné. Vol. II. Köln: Taschen, Wildenstein Institute. ISBN 3-8228-8759-5.
