= Earl Powell =

Earl Powell may refer to:

- Bud Powell (Earl Rudolph Powell, 1924–1966), jazz pianist
- Earl A. Powell III (born 1943), American art historian and museum director
