= Anne Bray =

American artist

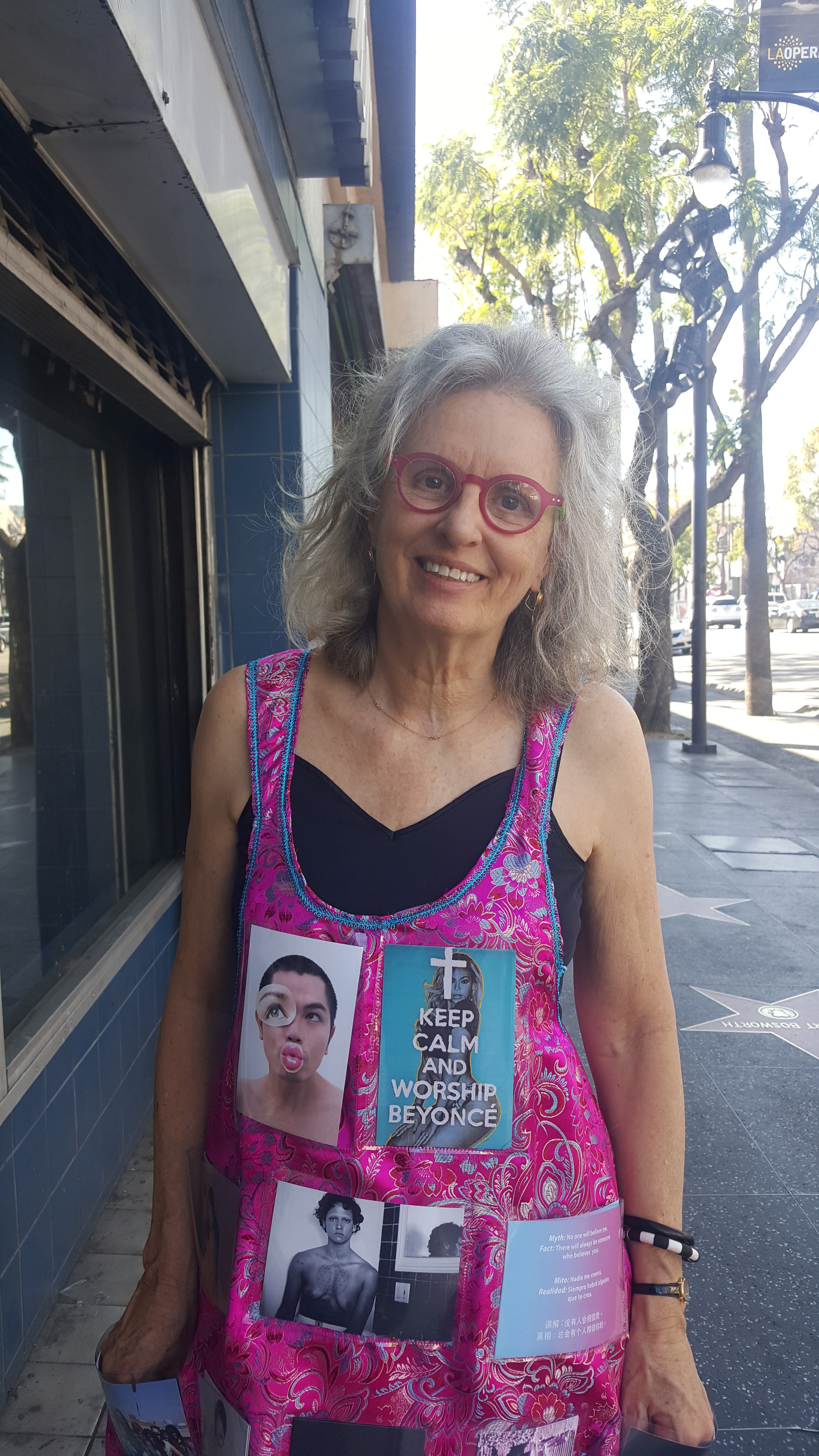
- Anne Bray in Hollywood, March 2017
- Education: UCLA; Colgate University
- Known for: Video art
- Website: www.annebray.com

Anne Bray is an American artist. Using video, audio, slides, 3-D screens, sculpture, and performance, Bray "spectacularizes still unresolved conflicts about the vulnerable" through temporary installations at public sites and art venues.

Bray is the co-founder of Freewaves, a Los Angeles-based nonprofit organization that advocates for and exhibits new, uncensored, independent media. Since 1989, Bray has planned the Freewaves Festival, which features independent and experimental media, that "exhibits a resistance to corporate capitalism." In addition to other programming, each festival includes Spanish-language arts organizations and content related to African-American and Asian-American communities. As of 2017, eleven biennial festivals presenting more than 3000 artists with the partnership of 125 curators and more than 100 organizations have been held at the Los Angeles Museum of Contemporary Art, the Getty Center, Hammer Museum, and on Hollywood and Chinatown streets. The festival is supported by National Endowment for the Arts, MacArthur Foundation, Rockefeller Foundation, Rauschenberg Foundation, and the Warhol Foundation.

In 2011, in association with Freewaves, Bray launched Out the Window, a project which streamed video art on Los Angeles County bus system. Largely created by Los Angeles teenagers, animations, documentaries, narratives, and experimental videos about and in Los Angeles were presented on Transit TV. A GPS-sensitive banner image at the bottom of each screen changed to correspond to the bus location.

Bray served as the video art consultant on the "See Change" installation that opened in 2012 at Tom Bradley International Terminal at Los Angeles International Airport.

In 2014, as part of "Out of the Window," Bray curated Long Live LA, which featured 35 videos on various health issues such as heart disease, obesity, mental health, lead exposure, and exercise. "“Our country’s public-health crisis has received a lot of attention in the traditional media... We thought that artists could bring a fresh perspective to these issues and reach people in a way that conventional public service announcements," Bray said in an interview with the Los Angeles Daily News. The videos were shown on more than 2,000 Los Angeles Metro buses across the county.

Bray was born in New London, Connecticut, and attended UCLA and Colgate University. She has taught at universities including Cal Arts, Claremont Graduate University, and UC Santa Barbara. Her work has been exhibited and performed in New York, Milan, Montreal, Boston, and throughout Southern California.
