= Thomas Krens =

American museum director

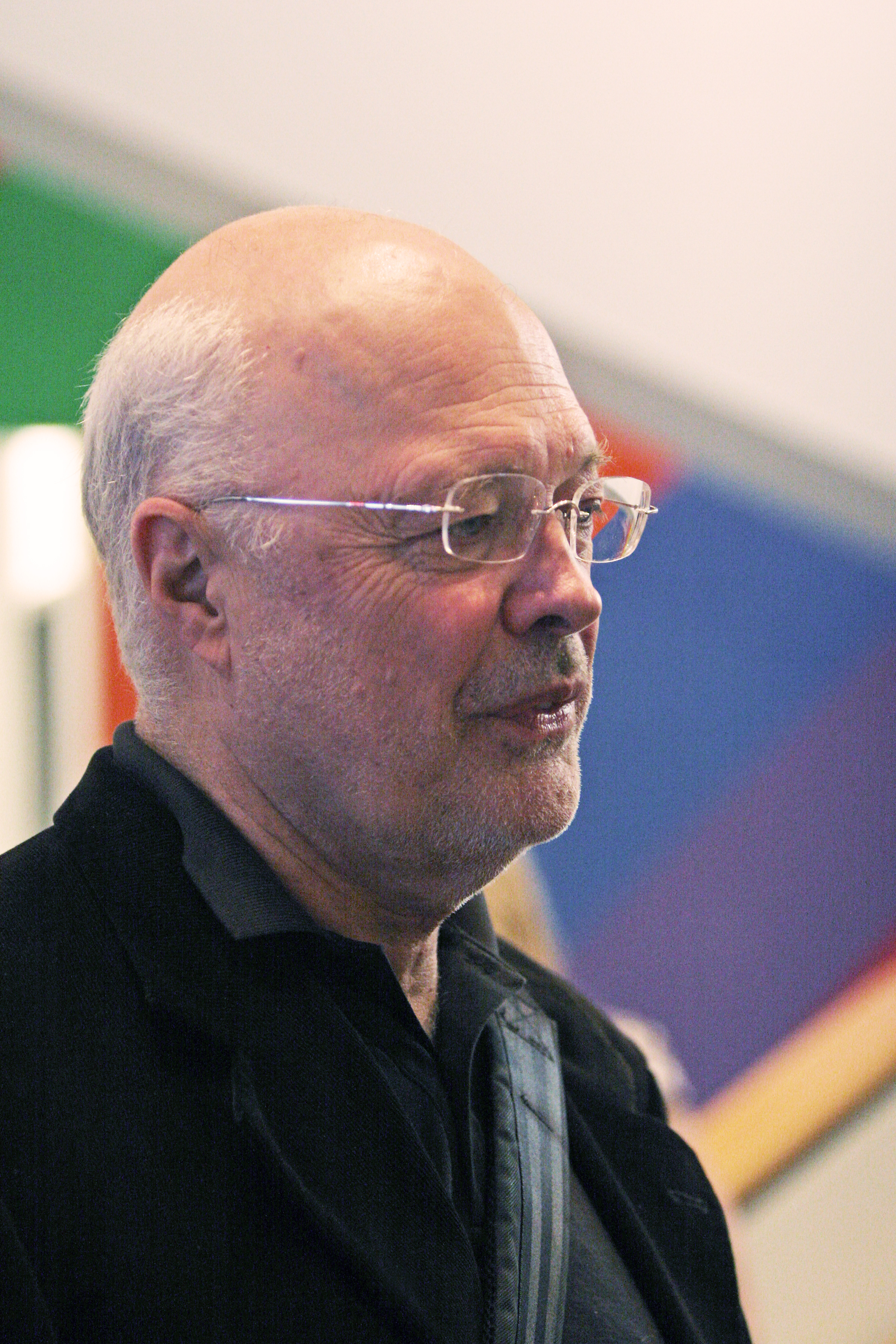
- Thomas Krens speaking at the Williams College Museum of Art in 2006.
- Born: December 26, 1946 (age 79); New York City
- Education: B.A. Political Economy w/honors Williams College 1969; M.A. State University of New York at Albany Art 1971; Master in Pub. and Private Management Yale University 1984; HHD (honors) State University of New York at Albany 1989
- Occupation: Senior Advisor for International Affairs
- Employer: Solomon R. Guggenheim Foundation
- Known for: Director of the Solomon R. Guggenheim Foundation from 1988 to 2008
- Awards: Honorary Doctorates from Williams College, Yale University, and the State University of New York at Albany; Special Prize for Architectural Patronage at the Venice Biennale of Architecture; Order of the Aztec Eagle (Mexico); American Federation of Arts Cultural Leadership Award

Notes
- Member of Association of Art Museum Directors, Réunion des Musées, Council on Foreign Relations, New York

Thomas Krens (born December 26, 1946) is the former director and Senior Advisor for International Affairs of the Solomon R. Guggenheim Foundation in New York City. From the beginning of his work at the Guggenheim, Krens promised, and delivered, great change, and was frequently in the spotlight, often as a figure of controversy.

During his 20-year tenure as director he expanded the Guggenheim globally by enlarging and raising the profile of the Peggy Guggenheim Collection in Venice, Italy, and then building the Guggenheim Museum Bilbao, Spain (1997), Deutsche Guggenheim, Berlin, Germany (1997, ended 2013), the Guggenheim Las Vegas (2001, closed 2003) and Guggenheim Hermitage Museum, also in Las Vegas, (2001, closed May 2008), Guggenheim Guadalajara, Mexico (cancelled in 2009, originally to open 2011), and the Frank Gehry-designed Guggenheim Abu Dhabi, currently under development. Krens spearheaded exhibitions such as The Art of the Motorcycle and ambitious shows covering the art of entire countries, including China and Brazil. As director, Krens increased the Guggenheim’s endowment from US$ 20 million to US$ 118 million.

Krens was succeeded as director of the Guggenheim Foundation by Richard Armstrong, formerly the chief curator and director of the Carnegie Museum of Art and a curator at the Whitney Museum of American Art.

== Early life ==
Born and raised in Newark, New York, an upstate community on the Erie Canal. Krens graduated from Williams College in 1969 with a degree in political science. While at Williams, he also studied with art historians Whitney Stoddard, S. Lane Faison, and William Pierson, who are credited with forming the cadre of museum curators and art historians now known as the Williams Art Mafia. After earning a master's degree in studio art from SUNY Albany in 1971, he returned to Williams to teach printmaking and was appointed director of the Williams College Museum of Art in 1980. During this time, Krens earned an M.B.A. from Yale University, which launched him into a career in museum management. In 1986, he was made consultant for the Solomon R. Guggenheim Museum in New York, and two years later became director of the Solomon R. Guggenheim Foundation.

== Directorship of the Guggenheim Foundation ==
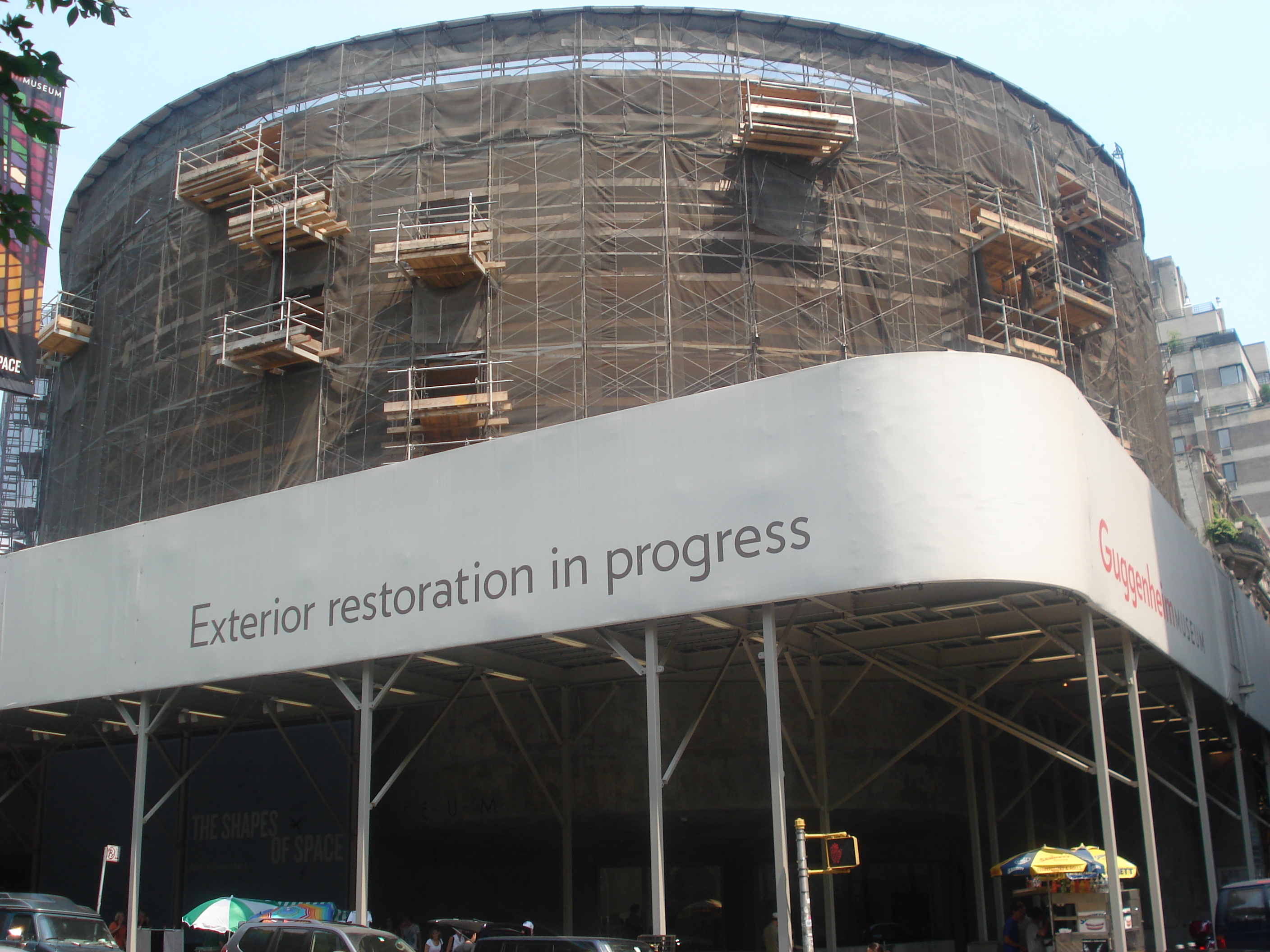
Exterior of Frank Lloyd Wright's Solomon R. Guggenheim museum in New York City during one of two renovations carried out during Thomas Krens' tenure as Director. 14 July 2007.

When Krens became the Guggenheim's director in 1988, faced with a tight budget, a building in need of renovation and weak donor interest, he said, "If you want a vital institution, change has to take place on so many fronts that it's likely to be bewildering." The 90s were a period of rapid expansion of museums across the US, not only the Guggenheim, and museum attendance was rising.

Krens was at the forefront of this movement, and became a high-profile figure in the world of art museums, corporate and foundation philanthropy, and the marketing of art to the public. On the subject of branding the Guggenheim, Krens said, "A good brand becomes an article of faith among a consumer audience. If you buy a BMW or a Mercedes, or stay at a Four Seasons hotel or go the Louvre, you can be pretty much guaranteed a quality experience." During his tenure, Krens has increased the Guggenheim’s endowment to $118 million from $20 million, although he has been known to dip into the endowment to cover operating costs.

=== Exhibitions and acquisitions ===
Krens mounted several historic exhibitions that rank among the 10 best-attended shows in the Guggenheim's history: "Africa: The Art of a Continent," in 1996; "China: 5,000 Years," in 1998, "Brazil: Body & Soul," in 2001; and "The Aztec Empire," in 2004. Moreover, under his leadership the Guggenheim organized major retrospectives of Claes Oldenburg, James Rosenquist, Roy Lichtenstein, Ellsworth Kelly, Roni Horn, Richard Prince, and Matthew Barney.

In 1989, Krens negotiated a gift of Impressionist paintings from the widow of Justin K. Thannhauser, acquired works of Minimalist art from the Panza Collection and oversaw the commissions of major artworks by Jeff Koons, Rosenquist, Rachel Whiteread and Gerhard Richter at Deutsche Guggenheim Berlin. These works later became part of the Guggenheim’s collection. In Bilbao, Krens led an acquisitions program that has included major installations of works by Richard Serra, Koons, Jenny Holzer and Louise Bourgeois. He also has doubled the size of the Peggy Guggenheim Collection.

=== Museum expansion ===
In 1986, Krens first conceived of converting the recently closed Sprague Electric, Marshall Street plant in North Adams, Massachusetts into the world's largest contemporary art museum back when he was director of the Williams College Museum of Art, one of many tentative expansion projects that Krens launched or proposed when he came to the Guggenheim. Krens's conception came to fruition when the site became the Massachusetts Museum of Contemporary Art (MASS MoCA) in 1999. He was not discouraged by those that did not get off the ground, and through persistence was able to see several huge projects to completion. The success of the expansion in Berlin came on the heels of the collapse of a proposed Guggenheim satellite in Salzburg, Austria, while at one time there were as many as three nascent projects in Venice.

While The Wall Street Journal complained at the time of many institutions expanding more rapidly than their collections allowed, leaving empty display space, the Guggenheim under Krens also found itself quickly acquiring new collections and being strapped for somewhere to put them, driving the need for expansions such as the Bilbao museum. Krens pointed out that the Guggenheim and many museums already had more objects in storage than they could hope to display, and spreading them geographically is a good solution. The Guggenheim in 1992 had space to display at one time 3% of its 6,000 works.

The strategy pursued, radical in the eyes of traditionalists, consisted of new construction and renovation, financed by bonds, and franchising by building satellite institutions around the world. Krens denied that deaccessioning (selling works from the collection) was a policy as well, though he was accused of treating the museum's collection of masterpieces as mere assets.

The success of the Guggenheim Bilbao expansion was credited to Krens' tenacity and salesmanship, and was a major victory for him. As of 2006 the Guggenheim museums worldwide had received a steady 2.5 million visitors a year for the prior 4–5 years, and attendance at the New York museum had tripled, according to Krens. Part of the strategy of international expansion was for host country governments to bear the costs, benefiting from prestige and tourist income.

=== Deaccessioning ===
In 1990, amidst a wave of US museums selling off parts of their collections, Krens was in the spotlight for selling works from what was seen as the Guggenheim's older, core collection (Kandinsky, Chagall and Modigliani) to raise $47 million to acquire newer 1960s and 1970s Minimalist sculptures from the Panza Collection. That is, the Guggenheim was accused of being trendy, and The New York Times critic Michael Kimmelman said the sales "stretched the accepted rules of deaccessioning further than many American institutions have been willing to do." Krens pointed out that the works acquired were no longer considered contemporary, but rather classics, and that such sales are a regular practice by museums.

=== Style and controversy ===
Krens has been the subject of criticism, both for his businesslike style and the way he changed museums, in particular the showmanship, populism and commercialization involved. Krens denied seeking to become a public figure, and said his media reputation is the result of "mostly inaccurate caricatures."

One of his harshest critics was the New Criterion's Hilton Kramer, who sees Krens as a "bureaucrat" who has caused disaster at a major cultural institution. Kramer's reaction to The Art of the Motorcycle was condemnation, and the hint of scandal over the financing of a Guggenheim retrospective of the work of fashion designer Giorgio Armani elicited withering attacks. The charge that the Guggenheim had sold out to the mass market coincided with hip-hop at the Brooklyn Museum of Art, the Museum of Fine Arts, Boston featuring guitar design, and The Metropolitan Museum of Art presenting rock music performance costumes. Krens dismissed the suggestion that Armani rented out the Guggenheim to show its wares, saying, "It's a non-story. Who do you get to support an institution? People who have relationships with it."

Krens gave up day-to-day control of the New York museum in 2005. Lisa Dennison became the new museum director while Krens remained director of the Solomon R. Guggenheim Foundation, amid some grumbling that the New York City building was being neglected, and financial friction with foundation trustees. Also in 2005, there was an attempt to force Krens out by a Guggenheim board member, billionaire philanthropist Peter B. Lewis, who had given US$ 77 million to the foundation. Lewis had become alarmed over the foundation's financial position and its reputation. The dispute ended with the board backing Krens and Lewis resigning.

Krens is seen by some young museum directors as a role model, or perhaps a cautionary tale. Exhibitions credited to inspiration by Krens have since appeared, such as a 2009 motorcycle show in Sydney, Australia. Guggenheim's Bilbao project is also credited with directly inspiring Fourth Grace in Liverpool and the Imperial War Museum North near Manchester. Norman Rosenthal, Exhibitions Secretary of the Royal Academy, said of Thomas Krens, "Krens is his own worst enemy. Everybody thinks that he is a corporate business type, but he is actually a great dreamer."

Peggy Guggenheim Collection, Venice

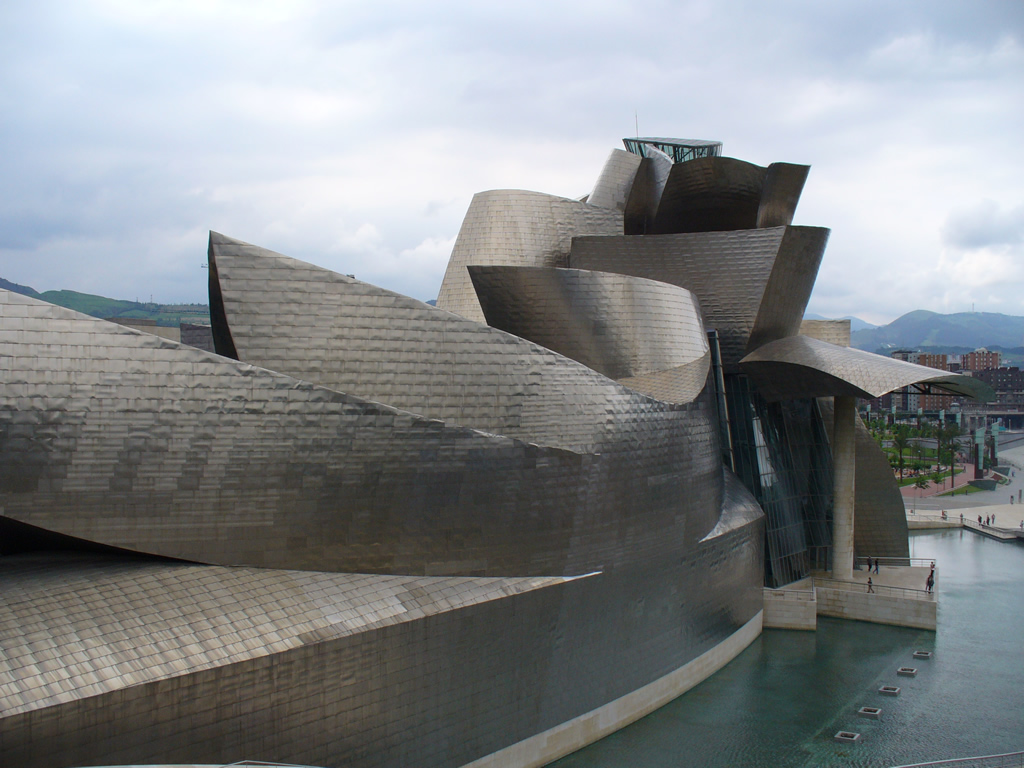
Guggenheim Bilbao

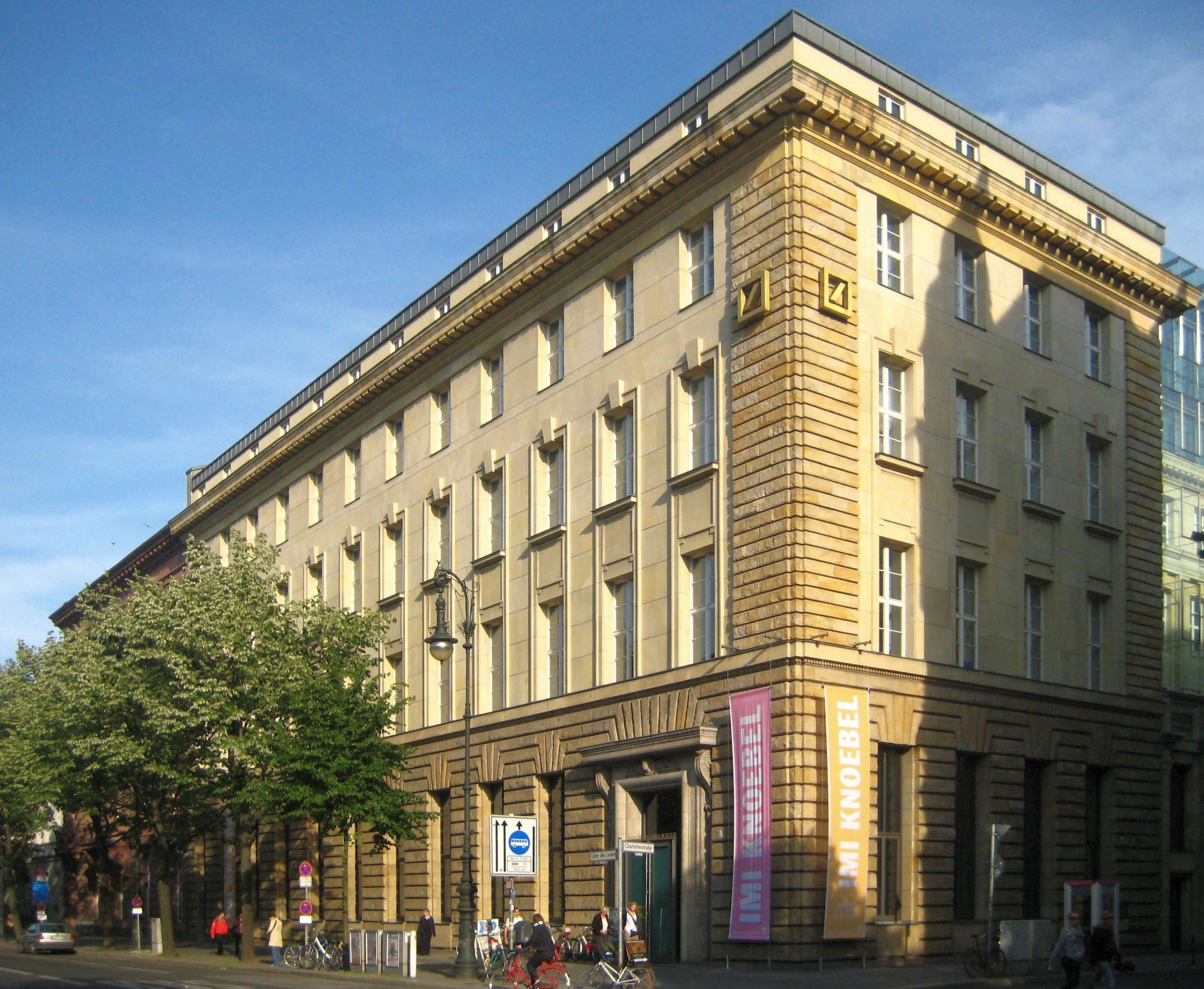
Deutsche Guggenheim

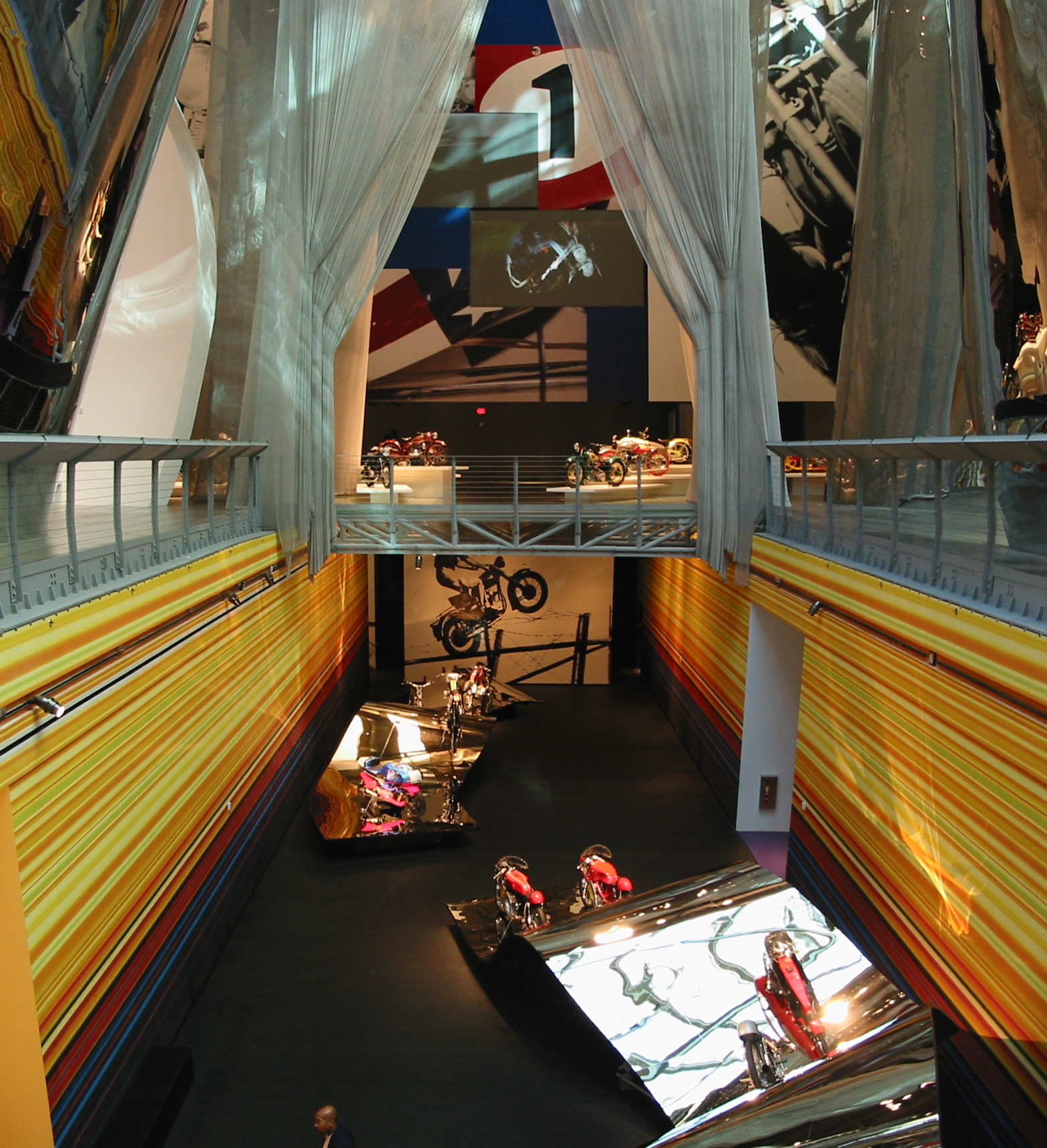
The Art of the Motorcycle Las Vegas

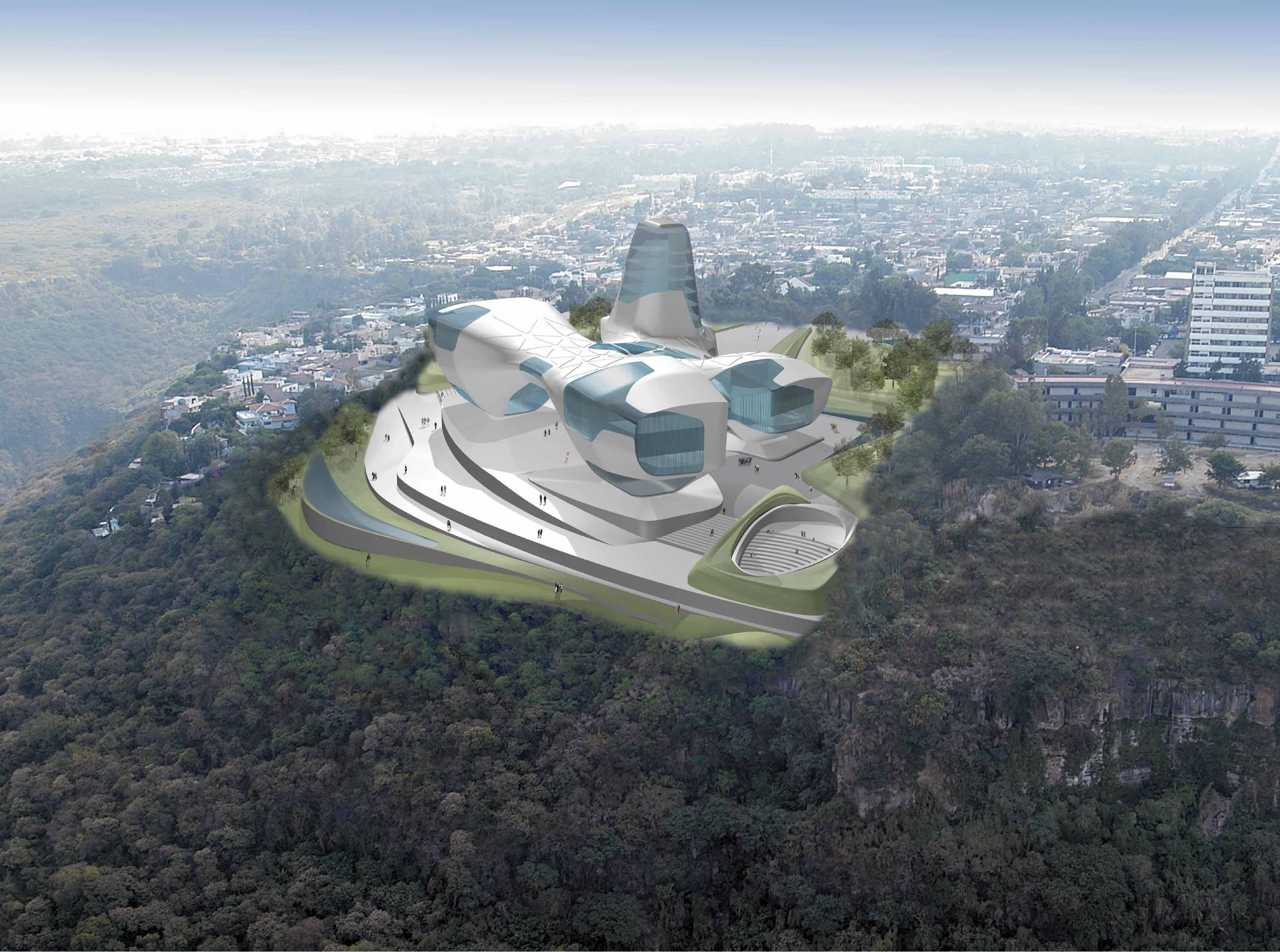
Guggenheim Guadalajara (rendering)

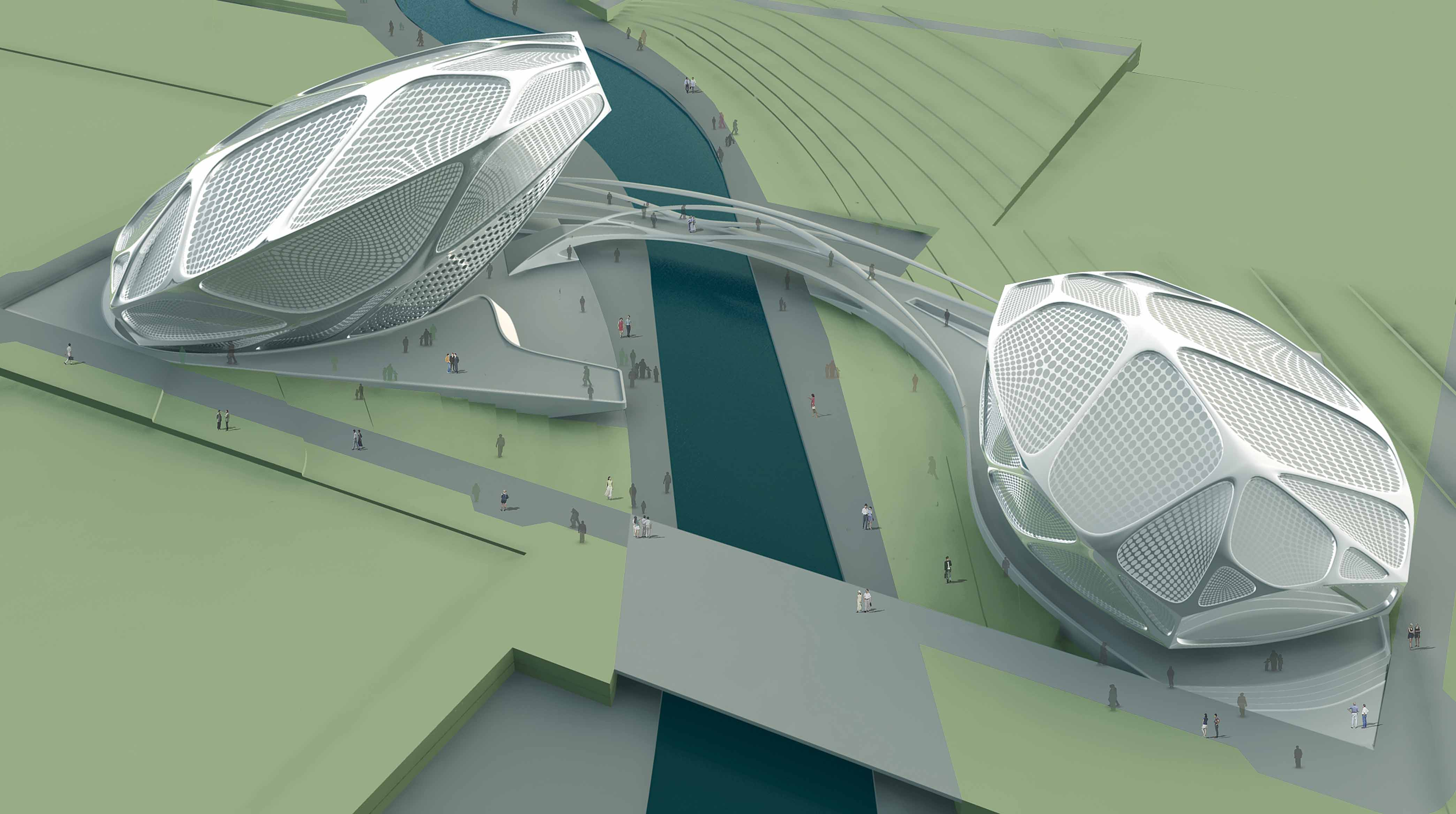
Guggenheim Abu Dhabi (rendering)

== Books by Thomas Krens ==
- Krens, Thomas; Thompson, Joseph; Solomon R. Guggenheim Museum; Williams College Museum of Art (1989), Refigured painting : the German image, 1960-88 / edited by Thomas Krens, Michael Govan, Joseph Thompson, Prestel, ISBN 3-7913-0866-1
- Krens, Thomas; Celant, German; Dennison, Lisa; Solomon R. Guggenheim Museum; Italie Palazzo Grassi Venise, eds. (1990), Da van Gogh a Picasso, Da Kandinsky a Pollock : il percorso dell'arte moderna / a cura di Thomas Krens, con Germano Celant, Lisa Dennison., Bompiani
- Krens, Thomas; Giménez, Carmen; Peggy Guggenheim Collection; Museo Nacional Centro de Arte Reina Sofía; Solomon R. Guggenheim Museum (1990), Obras maestras de la Colección Guggenheim : de Picasso a Pollock : 17 de enero al 13 de mayo de 1991, Museo Nacional Centro de Arte Reina Sofía / dirección, Thomas Krens, Carmen Giménez, Solomon R. Guggenheim Museum, ISBN 84-7483-697-2
- Krens, Thomas; Dennison, Lisa; Art Gallery of New South Wales; Solomon R. Guggenheim Museum (1991), Masterpieces from the Guggenheim : Art Gallery of New South Wales, Sydney, September 22, 1991-January 12, 1992 / selected by Thomas Krens with Lisa Dennison., Guggenheim Museum, ISBN 0-89207-090-0
- Krens, Thomas; Guggenheim Museum Staff (1998), Krens, Thomas; Drutt, Matthew (eds.), The Art of the Motorcycle, Harry N. Abrams, ISBN 0-8109-6912-2
