= John Jota Leaños =

American artist

John Jota Leaños is an artist, originally from Pomona, California. He is known for animation, installation, public art, and performance, which fuse traditional art practices and aesthetics with new technologies and contemporary interpretations. He is nationally acclaimed for earning various prestigious awards and for his contributions to Latin American and Cultural Studies.

== Personal life ==
=== Education ===
Leaños received his M.F.A. in photography from San Francisco State University in 2000. He has taught as an artist-in-residence at Carnegie Mellon University's Art Department in 2003 and at the University of California, Santa Barbara's Center for Chicano Studies from 2005 to 2006. Leaños was an Assistant Professor of Chicana/o Studies at Arizona State University from 2003 to 2007 and an Assistant Professor of Social Practices and Community Arts at the California College of the Arts from 2007 to 2009. Leaños is currently a professor at the University of California, Santa Cruz in the Department of Film and Digital Media.

=== Work ===
Leaños is a Creative Capital Foundation Grantee (2002) who has received the 2012 Guggenheim Fellowship. Leaños' work has been shown at the Sundance 06 Film Festival, the 2002 Whitney Biennial in New York, the San Francisco Museum of Modern Art, Museum of Contemporary Art in Los Angeles, and the Massachusetts Institute of Technology. Leaños' animated films have been shown internationally at festivals and museums, including the Sundance 2010 Film Festival, Cannes Short Corner '07 in France, WILDsound Film Festival '08 in Toronto, and the San Francisco International Festival of Animation.

In response to the political censorship during the height of the "war on terror", Leaños began working in musical and documentary animation as a tactic to diffuse political intolerance. Central to Leaños' art practice and cultural work lies the investigation of the documentary as a transformative discursive system where subaltern histories, untold stories, and decolonial perspectives arise in fictional and non-fictional forms. Through documentary animation, Leaños has made vast contributions to media art in the United States and the globe.

Leaños is the director and author of the mariachi performance Imperial Silence: Una Ópera Muerta (A Dead Opera in Four Acts) in collaboration with choreographer Joel Valentín-Martínez and the Mariachi Ensemble Los Cuatro Vientos. This "dead opera" fuses dark-humored animation with Mexican baile folklórico, modern dance, traditional Mariachi music, hip-hop, and borderlands blues.

From 2000 to 2004, Leaños was a part of artist collective Los Cybrids: La Raza Techno-Críitca, which critically engaged high technology from Latino perspectives. Their performance "El World Brain Disorder: Surveillance, Control, and Pendejismo" toured galleries and universities. Of Mexican-Italian-American descent, he identifies as part of the mainly hybrid tribe of Mexitaliano Xicangringo Güeros called "Los Mixtupos".

== Political censorship ==
In 2004 Leaños created two pieces that expressed his account on U.S. censorship and the "war on terror". In the following works Leaños' use of digital imaging express personal views of the U.S. occupation in Iraq:

=== Dead conversations on art and politics ===
In this piece Leaños is having an imaginary conversation with 19th-century Mexican artist and illustrator, José Guadalupe Posada (1851–1913). In this "dead conversation" Leaños fills Posada in on the current U.S. war in Iraq. Leaños explains to Posada that the U.S. military has committed sexual abuse crimes against Iraqi prisoners from the Abu Ghraib prison. Leaños goes onto show Posada some of the few of many degrading photos that the U.S. government released in 2004 of the Iraqi prisoners.

=== Intellectual freedom and Pat Tillman ===
John Jota Leaños became the center of national controversy in October 2004 when he created a poster questioning the heroization of former football player Pat Tillman's death during his military service in Afghanistan. These are the comments of Leaños, assistant professor of Chicana/o art, before a forum on academic freedom at Arizona State University in early December. Leaños explains his piece on Tillman as "... a quiet piece. It is an emotional argument. It brings issues into question. It does not violently scream at you. It uses first person as an artistic strategy. It's a declaration from the dead."

== Decolonizing/Postcolonial space ==
One of the main themes of Leaños' works is decolonization. According to Anibal Quijano, decolonization refers to the undoing of colonialism, either culturally or politically. Leaños has been involved with mural making and public artwork in places such as San Francisco's Mission district, in order to reclaim the public space. One of the more notable mural Leaños was a part of was Resist the Dot Con, which was done in collaboration with the Galeria de la Raza. Many of Leaños' writings about decolonizing space tries to answer the burdening question of how do art tactics of reclaiming space differ from more conservative groups who set out to reclaim their streets. He has also contributed immensely to the reclaiming of public space in marginalized communities that were taken over by the dot-com era.

== Xican@ ==
Leaños is one of many Chicanos who have identified as xican@, a recent modification of the word chican@. José Cuellar describes Xican@ in his entry on "Chicanismo/Xicanism@" in The Oxford Encyclopedia of Mesoamerican Cultures:

is a contemporary extension of the 20th century Chicanismo that is ideologically rooted in the Chicana feminist "Mexic Amerindian" consciousness that rejects machismo, exclusionary ethnocentrism and nationalism while emphasizing our prehistoric tendencies toward interdependence and cooperation that transcends gender, class, race, and geographic boundaries. ..."Xicanism@" appears more frequently as an orthographically distinctive identifier and definer of the U.S. Mexican consciousness that is at more feminist, cultural guerilla, and more Amerindio than ever.

As a Xican@, Leanos strives to bring into light the varies social, political, and economic injustices that Chicanos face on a daily basis. One of the main differences Xican@s use to distinguish themselves from Chican@s, is that they do not claim to "'take back' the territory and rights that belong to 'us'", they argue that such a strategy ignores the hybrid cultures that all American urban spaces represent. Much like Xican@s, their murals are a hybrid of Mexican-American working class aesthetics, culture and politics.

== Images and videos ==
- Frontera!
- Resist the Dot Con 2000, June 6, 2012
- Los restos colonials se manifiestan en el olvido, June 6, 2012
- Los ABCs ¡Qué Vivan los Muerto! June 5, 2012
- Deadtime Stories with Mariachi Goose and Friends, June 5, 2012
- DNN: Dead News Network, 2017
