= Alex Donis =

American visual artist

- Born: 1964 (age 61–62); Chicago, Illinois
- Education: California State University, Long Beach; Otis College of Art and Design
- Known for: Visual arts, Painting
- Notable work: "My Cathedral" (1997)

Alex Donis (born 1964) is an American visual artist known for provocative work that explores themes of identity, history, and relationships through a queer lens, which has often led to public controversy and attempts at censorship. An alumnus of California State University, Long Beach, and Otis College of Art and Design, Donis's career is marked by several high-profile exhibitions that were challenged or censored.

His 1997 solo exhibition, My Cathedral, at San Francisco's Galería de la Raza, gained national attention after paintings depicting figures such as Jesus kissing the Hindu deity Rama and Che Guevara kissing Cesar Chavez were destroyed by vandals. In 2001, his exhibition WAR at the Watts Towers Arts Center, which depicted homoerotic scenes between Los Angeles police officers and alleged gang members, was removed following community complaints. The removal sparked public outrage over censorship and drew the attention of the ACLU. In 2024, his art was included in the major group exhibition Xican-a.o.x. Body at the Pérez Art Museum Miami.

== Biography ==
Donis was born in Chicago, Illinois. Donis attended California State University, Long Beach for his undergraduate degree, and obtained his graduate degree from Otis College of Art and Design in Los Angeles. His work is known, partially, for the many attempts to censor his exhibitions.

== Notable art ==
Donis' exhibition titled My Cathedral, was held at the Galeria de la Raza in San Francisco in 1997. The solo exhibition featured light-box paintings, including his painting titled, Jesus and Lord Rama (1997). This painting and another titled, Che Guevara and Cesar Chavez (1997) were destroyed in an act of vandalism at the exhibition. The destroyed paintings illustrated each of the two titled figures kissing each other, such as Jesus kissing the Hindu god, Lord Rama and Che Guevara kissing Cesar Chavez. In media reports, Donis stated that after the exhibition was vandalized, around 200 people from various different communities came together to have a discussion about homophobia.

Donis' 2001 solo exhibition at the Watts Towers Arts Center, in Los Angeles, was titled WAR. Donis was an art instructor at the Watts Towers Arts Center. In media reports, it was stated that the exhibition was removed due to threats of violence by local gang members. This claim was not proven. It seemed that a community group members found the content objectionable, "pornographic" and "too homoerotic". The images illustrated the war in Los Angeles between peace officers such as the Los Angeles Police Department and community youth perceived as gang affiliated. Images included Popeye and Captain McGill (2001), Officer Moreno and Joker (2001), Lucky Dice and Officer Gates (2001), and Young Crip, Young Blood (2001). When the exhibition was removed, and at the request of the artist, the Watts Towers Arts Center placed the following sign on the empty walls which read, "War is Cancelled". The removal of the exhibit sparked public outrage and news coverage, which caught the attention of the ACLU. The exhibition was moved to the Frumkin/Duval Gallery in Santa Monica. In 2024, his work was included in the group show Xican-a.o.x. Body at the Pérez Art Museum Miami, Florida.
