= Earl A. Powell III =

American art historian

Earl Alexander Powell, III
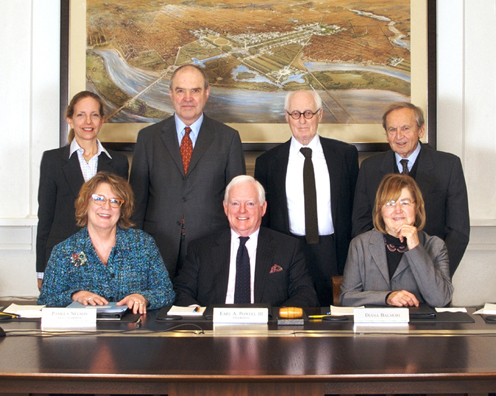
- Earl A. Powell, III (seated, center)

Chair of the U.S. Commission of Fine Arts
- In office 2004–2021
- Preceded by: David Childs
- Succeeded by: Justin Shubow

Director of the National Gallery of Art
- In office September 1992 – March 2019
- Preceded by: J. Carter Brown

Personal details
- Born: October 24, 1943 (age 82) Spartanburg, South Carolina, U.S.
- Spouse: Nancy Landry Powell
- Parent(s): Earl Alexander Powell II and Elizabeth Duckworth Powell
- Occupation: Museum director

Earl Alexander Powell III (born October 24, 1943), nicknamed Rusty Powell, is an American art historian and museum director. From 1980 to 1992, he was Director of the Los Angeles County Museum of Art. He was appointed Director of the National Gallery of Art in Washington, D.C., in September 1992. The Gallery announced in November 2017 that Powell would step down in 2019. He was appointed to the U.S. Commission of Fine Arts in 2003 and elected Chair in 2004. He was appointed to a second four-year term on August 30, 2012, and continues to serve as Chair.

== Early life ==
Earl Powell was born in October 1943 in Spartanburg, South Carolina, to Earl Alexander Powell II and Elizabeth Duckworth Powell. His grandfather operated a photoengraving business, which Powell credits as influential in sparking his later love of art. The Powells moved to Rhode Island. "Rusty", as Powell was known, graduated from Providence Country Day School in 1962. He was a standout football player in high school.

Powell graduated from Williams College in Williamstown, Massachusetts with a bachelor's degree in art history and European history (with honors) in 1966. He was a pre-med major, but barely passed his introductory chemistry class. Powell switched to art history, and studied under the legendary art history professors S. Lane Faison, Jr., Whitney Stoddard, and William Pierson, Jr.

Powell enlisted in the United States Navy in 1966, winning a spot in the Navy Officer Candidate School. His active duty service, which lasted until 1969, included a tour of duty in Vietnam as a navigator during the Vietnam War. He left active duty service and entered the United States Navy Reserve, serving until 1980.

After leaving the Navy, Powell considered becoming an architect. His old professor, S. Lane Faison, strongly discouraged him. As Powell later recalled, Faison said, "That's stupid. You should go into art history. It's the only thing you were ever good at." Powell enrolled at Harvard University, where he obtained a Master of Arts from the Fogg Museum in 1970. He entered the doctoral program in art history at Harvard in 1970. While working on his degree, he served as a teaching fellow. Powell's dissertation was on the work of the early American painter Thomas Cole, and he received his doctorate in 19th-century American and European art history in 1974.

The same year he received his Ph.D., Powell took a position as assistant professor of art history at the University of Texas at Austin.

In 1976, Powell left the University of Texas to take a position as a curator at the National Gallery of Art (NGA). The NGA's director at the time, J. Carter Brown, recruited Powell away from teaching. "I first spotted (Powell) in Austin, Texas. It occurred to me that he had rare potential, someone who had a passion for art, but yet had his feet on the ground. He was a people person, yet he could also handle the administrative details...," Brown later said. Powell stayed at the NGA for four years, rising to the position of executive curator in 1979. Brown later said, "Rusty was my right hand for years". During his time as curator, Powell organized some of the NGA's biggest exhibitions, including "The Splendor of Dresden: Five Centuries of Art Collecting" in 1978 and "American Light: The Luminist Movement" in 1980.

== LACMA directorship ==
In January 1980, the Los Angeles County Museum of Art (LACMA) hired Powell to be its director.

Powell's tenure at LACMA was an outstanding one. In his first six years, he doubled the exhibition space by opening the Robert O. Anderson Building and the Pavilion for Japanese Art to house a rare collection of Japanese art. He also oversaw the opening of the museum's new outdoor sculpture garden in 1988.

Powell was also a successful fund-raiser for the museum. In his first eight years, he reached his fund-raising goal of $80 million. In 1991, publisher Walter Annenberg donated $10 million to the museum, the largest cash donation in its history. During Powell's tenure, the LACMA endowment also rose to $21 million from $3 million.

J. Carter Brown later described Powell's tenure as director of LACMA as one "bound for glory".

== National Gallery of Art ==
On January 24, 1992, J. Carter Brown announced that he was retiring as director of the National Gallery of Art in Washington, D.C. After a nationwide search, Earl A. Powell III was named director of the National Gallery of Art. He was only the fourth director in the museum's history. He assumed the directorship on September 1, 1992. When he was appointed, Powell said that he believed the era of "blockbuster" exhibitions was ending, and that his focus would be to utilize the NGA's permanent collection. "I don't see the future for these massive international loan exhibitions," he said. "I would prefer to use the gallery's permanent collections in new and innovative ways."

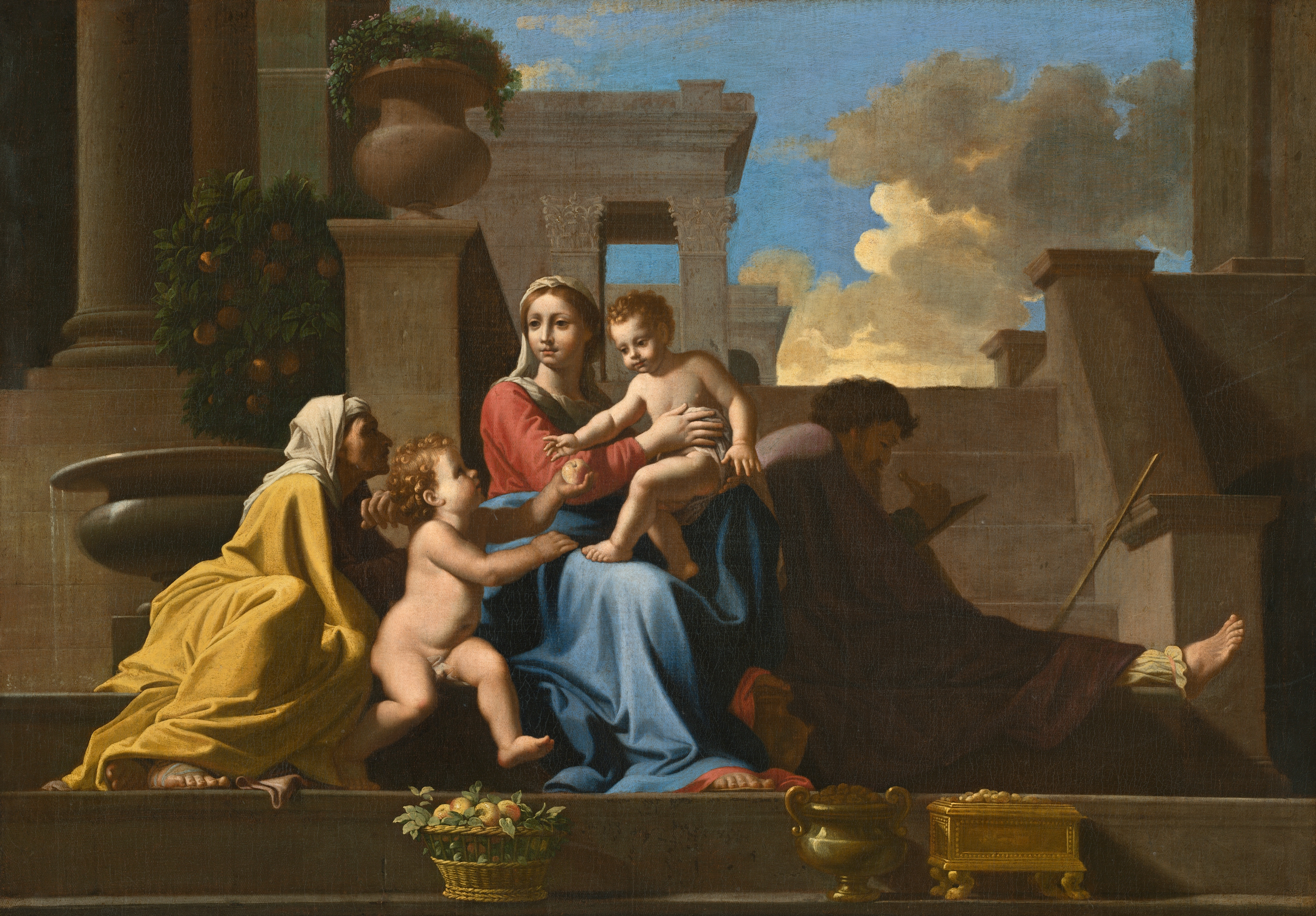
The Holy Family on the Steps, which the NGA learned during Powell's tenure was not by Nicolas Poussin.

During the beginning of Powell's tenure at the NGA, he faced several challenges. In May 1994, the NGA learned that its painting, The Holy Family on the Steps, was a forgery and not the work of 17th-century French painter Nicolas Poussin. Powell was criticized for not ordering the relabeling of the painting in a timely manner, and for mishandling the NGA's response to its critics. In December 1994, D.C. television station WJLA ran a three-part exposé titled "Gallery of Shame", in which the station revealed the content of a confidential report that criticized the NGA for severe lapses in maintenance, environmental control, and art storage. The report said that these conditions "threaten[ed] the security of the collection" and placed works of art "at risk" of "serious damage." The report documented a leaky roof, dripping skylights, flooded storerooms, and burst radiators that poured clouds of steam into galleries. In one case, a poorly maintained humidifier turned the varnish on John Singleton Copley's Watson and the Shark an opaque white. (The painting was restored with no damage.) The report also criticized the management structure at the museum, documented low employee morale, and uncovered poor minority hiring practices. Powell attacked WJLA's report as "hyperbole and exaggeration", and said that not a single work of art had been damaged. He also said that the NGA had been aware of the problems for several years, and that he already had a plan in place to implement the consultants' recommendations within 12 months.

Powell has also had numerous and notable successes as NGA director. In 1995, the museum mounted the first comprehensive retrospective of the work of American painter Winslow Homer in 25 years. It also hosted an exhibit of nearly all the works of 17th century Dutch painter Johannes Vermeer. The Vermeer exhibit was shuttered three times in November and December 1995 when the federal government shut down after President Bill Clinton and the United States Congress were unable to reach agreement on a federal budget. Powell ordered that $30,000 from the NGA's Fund for International Exchange be used to reopen the Vermeer exhibit (but no other parts of the National Gallery of Art) for one week. In 1997, Powell presided over the ground-breaking for the National Gallery of Art Sculpture Garden.

== Other posts, writing, and honors ==
In June 2002, President George W. Bush nominated and the United States Senate approved Powell for a position as a member of the National Council on the Arts, an advisory panel for the National Endowment for the Arts. Powell filled an unexpired six-year term which would end on September 3, 2006. But Powell resigned the position in late 2003.

In May 2005, architect David Childs resigned as chairman of the U.S. Commission of Fine Arts (CFA). President Bush immediately appointed Powell to the commission. His fellow commissioners elected Powell chairman of the CFA. During his tenure as chairman of the CFA, Powell and the CFA provided input and advice for the Monumental Core Framework Plan, a 2006 study by the National Capital Planning Commission which made recommendations regarding land use, transportation, and urban design in areas around the National Mall. President Bush reappointed Powell to the CFA in May 2008. Again he was elected chairman. During his second term, Powell led the CFA in participating in the study and review of the Final National Mall Plan / Environmental Impact Statement—a 2010 plan by the National Park Service to craft a vision and planning document to guide the National Mall in Washington, D.C., for the next 50 years.

President Barack Obama appointed Powell to a second full four-year term on the CFA in August 2012. Once more, Powell continued as chairman.

=== Written works ===
Powell has published a number of scholarly and popular works. As curator and director at two major art museums, he has written numerous exhibit reviews and introductions to exhibit catalogs. Among the more notable of these is his 1980 essay on early American Luminist painter Fitz Hugh Lane.

As a scholar of the works of Thomas Cole, Powell has written extensively on the painter's art. His more prominent works include "Thomas Cole's 'Dream of Arcadia'" (published in Arts Magazine in November 1977), and "Thomas Cole and the American Landscape Tradition: The Naturalist Controversy" (published in Arts Magazine in February 1978). Powell also authored a monograph on Thomas Cole in 1990. A revised second edition was published in 2000.

=== Honors ===
Powell has been honored with several positions. He was elected to a three-year term on the Pitzer College Board of Trustees in 1986, and was a director of the Georgia O'Keeffe Foundation in 2005.

Powell was member of many academic organizations, including the American Philosophical Society, the Federal Council on the Arts and the Humanities, and the National Portrait Gallery Commission.

Powell has also been awarded honorary doctorates from the Otis College of Art and Design (1987) and Williams College (1993).

Among the many awards Powell has received are the St. Olav's Medal from Norway (1978), the Order of Prince Henry from Portugal (1995), the Order of Merit of the Italian Republic from Italy (1998), Knight of the Legion of Honour from France (2000), Officer of the Ordre des Arts et des Lettres from France (2004), the Saint Gaudens Medal (2005), Order of the Aztec Eagle from Mexico (2007), and the Officer's Cross of the Order of Merit of the Republic of Hungary (2009).

== Personal life ==
Earl Powell married Nancy Landry of New Orleans in 1971. They have three children.

The Powells owned a summer home in Newport, Rhode Island, where (as of 1992) Powell's mother and mother-in-law both lived.
