= Poli Marichal =

Puerto Rican illustrator, painter and filmmaker

- Born: February 1, 1955 (age 71); Ponce, Puerto Rico
- Education: Escola Massana (Barcelona); Escuela de Artes Plásticas (San Juan); Massachusetts College of Art and Design
- Known for: Painting, printmaking, filmmaking
- Notable work: Underwater Blues, Al Rojo Vivo, Guernica, Blues Tropical, Coffee Break
- Movement: Experimental film, Caribbean visual arts
- Parent: Carlos Marichal
- Awards: Rockefeller Media Arts Fellowship, New Works Grant (Massachusetts Council for the Arts)

Poli Marichal (born February 1, 1955, Ponce, Puerto Rico) is a Puerto Rican artist living in Los Angeles, California who works in illustration, painting and filmmaking. She is the daughter of painter Carlos Marichal. Her works have consistently explored one of two themes: (1) social, political, and environmental concerns, and (2) introspection and emotions. She is also celebrated as one of the first experimental filmmakers in Puerto Rico, starting this pursuit in the mid-1980s. Marichal has also taught printmaking classes in New York City and California. Some of her awards include the Rockefeller Media Arts Fellowship and a New Works Grant from the Massachusetts Council for the Arts.

== Education ==
Poli Marichal completed a two-year exchange at the Escola Massana in Barcelona (1976) and received a Bachelor's degree in Art with a concentration in Printmaking from Escuela de Artes Plásticas in San Juan, Puerto Rico (1978), and a Master's degree in Art from the Massachusetts College of Art and Design (1982).

== Partial filmography ==
- Underwater Blues (1981), "Hand painted, scratched animated Super 8 film examining the contradictions of the psychopathology of colonization."
- Al Rojo Vivo (1982), "This work recreates the spirit of frustration and is the result of scratching and painting the tiny super 8 mm frame without magnification. The soundtrack was performed with a percussion instrument and voice."
- Guernica (1982), "Experimental Super 8 film featuring animated 3-D puppets based on the characters in Picasso’s painting."
- Blues Tropical (1983), "First part of the Trilogy of the Island in which Poli Marichal expresses and vents the anger and frustration caused by the colonial situation."
- Isla Postal (1984), "Hand painted, scratched Super 8 film meditating on Puerto Rico’s political status through the layering of traditional Bomba music and governmental speeches."
- Coffee Break (1987), "Experimental film which incorporates a range of materials, ink, coloring pencils, watercolors, and graphite, to narrate the story of a woman who is transformed into a cat while she drinks the celebrated beverage of the island, coffee."
- Los espejísmos de Mandrágora Luna (1987).
- Son Africaribeño (1995).

== Public collections ==
- Los Angeles County Museum of Art, Los Angeles, California
- Smithsonian American Art Museum
- Mexican Fine Arts Museum, Chicago, Illinois
- Casa de las Américas, Havana, Cuba
- The Institute of Puerto Rican Culture, San Juan, Puerto Rico
- Museo de Arte de Puerto Rico
- The University of Puerto Rico Museum of Anthropology, History and Art, Puerto Rico
- Institute for Latino Studies University of Notre Dame, Indiana
- Galería Sin Fronteras, Austin, Texas
- The Benson Latin American Collection at the University of Texas at Austin, Texas
- The Center for Puerto Rican Studies at Hunter College, New York
- Donald C. Davidson Library at the University of Santa Barbara
- Vincent Price Art Museum, California
- Laguna Art Museum, Orange County Art Museum, California
- Huntington Museum, University of Texas, Austin, Texas
- Colección Reyes-Veray, San Juan, Puerto Rico
