= S. Lane Faison =

American art historian

Samson Lane Faison, Jr.
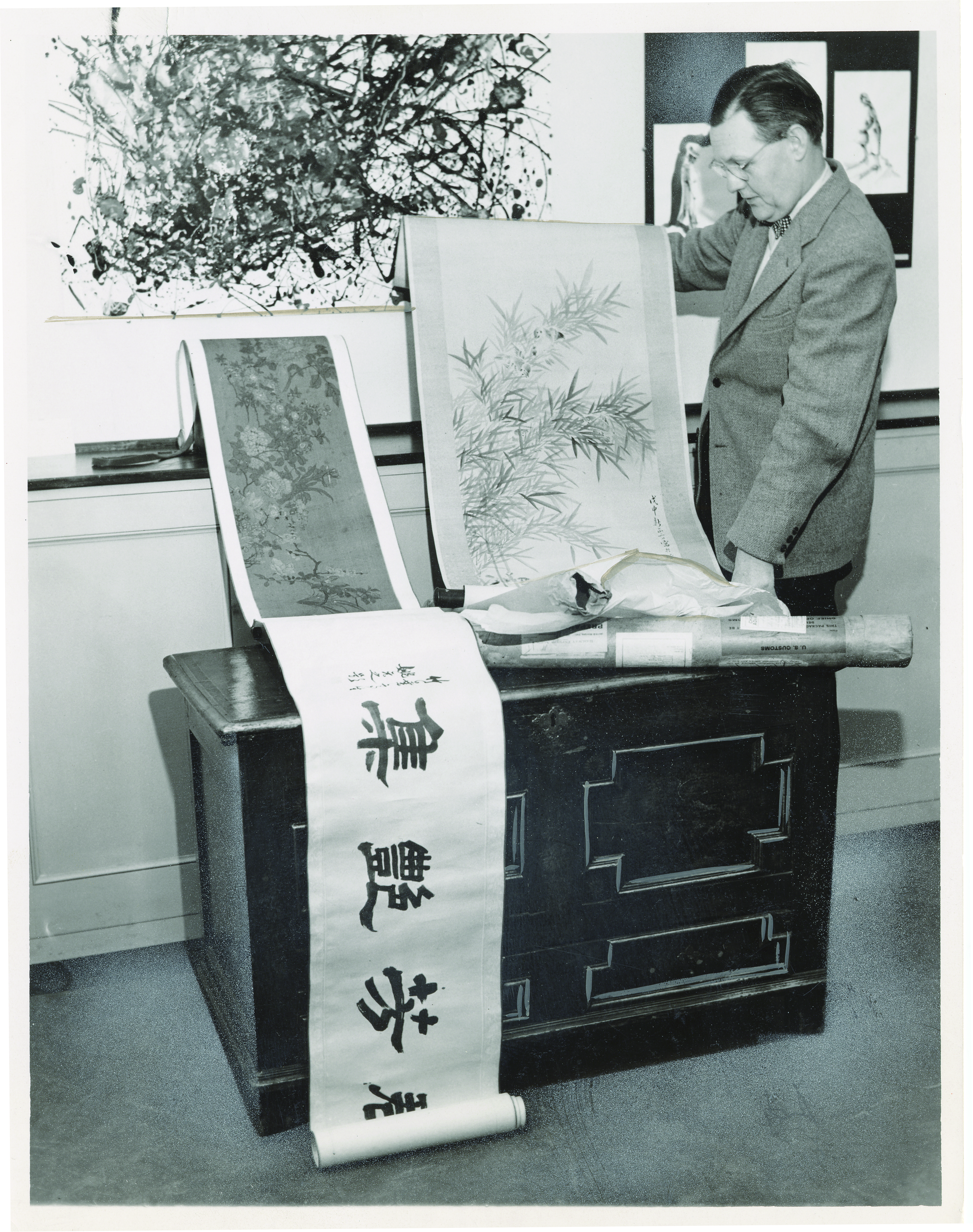
- S. Lane Faison, director of the Williams College Museum of Art from 1948 to 1976.
- Born: November 16, 1907; Washington, D.C., U.S.
- Died: November 11, 2006 (aged 98); Williamstown, Massachusetts, U.S.
- Military career
- Allegiance: United States
- Branch: United States Navy
- Service years: 1942–1946
- Rank: Lieutenant commander
- Conflicts: World War II
- Awards: Legion of Honour

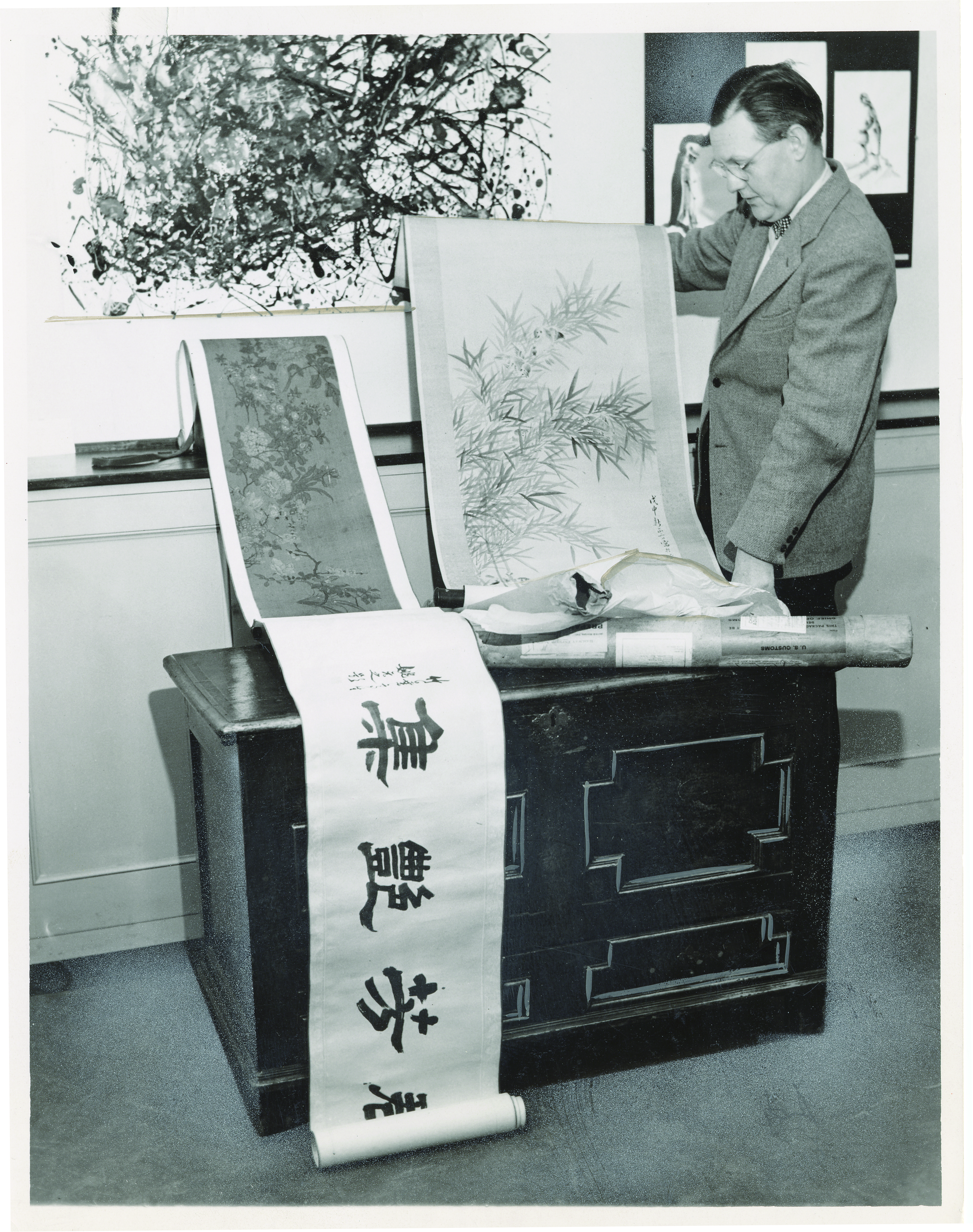
S. Lane Faison, director of the Williams College Museum of Art from 1948 to 1976.

Samson Lane Faison Jr. (November 16, 1907 – November 11, 2006) was an American art historian, professor, and director of the Williams College Museum of Art. He was one of the famed "Monuments Men" in World War II.

== Early life ==
Faison was born in Washington, D.C., to Eleanor Sowers and Samson L. Faison in 1907. His father was a West Point graduate and a general in World War I. Lane had one sibling, a younger sister named Eleanor. A boyhood trip to France that included a chance visit to Chartres Cathedral awakened a passion for art and inspired his future career.

He was himself trained at Williams (class of 1929) by Karl E. Weston, who inspired an earlier generation of art scholars in the 1920s. During the 1930s, after receiving an M.A. from Harvard (1930) and an MFA from Princeton (1932), he was a very close assistant to French visiting scholars at Yale, Marcel Aubert and Henri Focillon. He translated into English the major work of Focillon, La vie des formes (The Life of Forms in Art, New York, Wittenborn, Schultz, 1948).

== Career ==
Faison later headed the Williams College art history department from 1940 to 1969 and directed the Williams College Museum of Art from 1948 to 1976.

While directing the Williams College Museum of Art and art history department, Faison made it his mission to inspire interest in art history among students at Williams College. Dramatically expanding the museum's collections, especially in contemporary art, Faison encouraged his students to see the compatibility of their art historical studies with all aspects of their lives as Williams students, from their fraternity parties to their English literature classes. Many of his students began their freshman year at Williams planning to become doctors, lawyers, and investment bankers, but, upon graduation, found themselves turning to the art world due to Faison's inspirational pedagogy. Adding a new Art Studio curriculum to what was then Williams's "Fine Arts" department, Faison emphasized learning by doing and developed the emphasis on visual analysis of shape, color, and form that has become the most distinctive element of the college's Art History sequence.

In 2004, he told the New York Times:

I always stressed two things. One has to do with the connection of art to history, with the fact that every work of art was done somewhere and some when, and that this is very important to understand. The other side has to do with the medium of art, which is quite different from the subject. What we're talking about is color and shape. You'd be surprised at the number of people who come to Williams, and I think this is generally true of American students, with absolutely no idea of what the word 'shape' means or what you can do with it and why it's important. They have easily mastered the medium of language, but many of them know very little about the medium of art.

Several of his students went on to direct major museums including Kirk Varnedoe of the Museum of Modern Art, Earl A. Powell III of the National Gallery of Art in Washington, D.C., Glenn D. Lowry of the Museum of Modern Art in New York City, James N. Wood of the Getty Trust and Art Institute of Chicago, and Thomas Krens of the Guggenheim Museum in New York.

== Monuments Man ==
Faison was a Navy Reservist during World War II, attaining the rank of lieutenant commander. In 1945 he was posted to the Office of Strategic Services' Art Looting Investigation Unit. He wrote the official top-secret report (see selected publications) on Adolf Hitler's collection of stolen art. Five years later, he supervised the return of stolen art under the direction of the Department of State to major European cities such as Vienna and Paris. In 1952, he was awarded a Chevalier of French Legion of Honour for his service. Faison wrote as art critic for The Nation from 1951 to 1955.

== Selected publications ==
- Faison, S. L., & United States. (1945). Hermann Voss. Washington, D.C.: U.S. Army, Office of Strategic Services, Art Looting Investigation Unit.
- Faison, S. L., & United States. (1945). Linz: Hitler's museum and library. Washington, D.C.: U.S. Army, Office of Strategic Services, Art Looting Investigation Unit.

== Personal ==
In 1935 he married Virginia Weed (d. 1997), a native of Savannah and graduate of Smith College. They had four sons: Gordon Lane (b. 1937), George Weston (b. 1940), Christopher Maury (b. 1944), and Samson Lane III (b. 1947).

S. Lane Faison Jr. died on November 11, 2006, in Williamstown, Massachusetts, five days shy of his 99th birthday

== Sources ==
- The New York Times, October 28, 1997, "An Art Lover Who Awakened a Generation" by Judith H. Dobrzynski
- LEGACY: One College's Long Shadow: Looking Back at the 'Williams Mafia' The New York Times, March 31, 2004, By Stephen Kinzer, Chicago
- The Washington Post, November 17, 2006, Obituary.
- Michael J. Lewis, "An Art Teacher's Art Teacher," Commentary 123, no. 4 (April 2007), pp. 58–62
- Sorensen, Lee. "Faison, S. Lane." In Dictionary of Art Historians (27 November 2000) http://arthistorians.info/faisons

== See also ==
- Williams College
- Williams College Museum of Art
