= James N. Wood =

American museum director (1941–2010)

James Nowell Wood (March 20, 1941 – June 11, 2010) was an American museum director who spent 25 years as head of the Art Institute of Chicago and later served as head of the J. Paul Getty Trust, starting in 2006.

== Biography ==
Wood was born in Boston, Massachusetts. on March 20, 1941. He earned a bachelor's degree from Williams College with a major in art history and earned a master's degree from the New York University Institute of Fine Arts. Early in his career, Wood worked at positions at the Albright-Knox Art Gallery, the Metropolitan Museum of Art, and served for six years as the director of the Saint Louis Art Museum.

At the Art Institute of Chicago starting in the early 1980s, Wood conducted a major expansion of its collection and oversaw a major renovation and expansion project for its facilities. As "one of the most respected museum leaders in the country", as described by The New York Times, Wood created major exhibitions of works by Paul Gauguin, Claude Monet and Vincent van Gogh that set records for attendance at the museum. He retired from the museum in 2004.

In 2006, Wood was named to head the J. Paul Getty Trust, succeeding Barry Munitz. Wood was the first person with strong experience in the management of museums to head the trust, which oversees the operation of the J. Paul Getty Museum. The New York Times credited Wood with having restored the museum's reputation by reorganizing the trust and restructuring its staff. In 2009, after a substantial drop in the trust's assets, Wood cut nearly 100 employees at the trust's various operations, most at the Getty Museum. Fees for parking at the museum and the Getty Villa were raised by 50% to $15.

Wood died of natural causes at age 69 on June 11, 2010, at his home in Brentwood, Los Angeles. He was survived by his wife, Emese Forizs, as well as by two daughters and four grandchildren.
