= Bill Graham Archives v. Dorling Kindersley, Ltd. =

2006 American copyright law case

Bill Graham Archives v. Dorling Kindersley Ltd.
- Court: United States Court of Appeals for the Second Circuit
- Argued: January 4 2006
- Decided: May 9 2006
- Citation: 448 F.3d 605

Case history
- Procedural history: Summary judgement for defendant, 386 F.Supp.2d 324 (S.D.N.Y. 2005)

Holding
- Images of concert posters and tickets, greatly reduced from original, in a reference book timeline, was fair use as it transformed the works into historical artifacts that enhanced understanding of subject band's history, limiting importance of expressive nature of original work; assessment of market impact of copied works is limited to traditional markets for derivative works. Southern District affirmed.

Court membership
- Judges sitting: Kearse, Raggi, Restani (sitting by designation)

Case opinions
- Majority: Restani, joined by unanimous

Bill Graham Archives v. Dorling Kindersley, Ltd., 448 F.3d 605, is a 2006 case of the United States Court of Appeals for the Second Circuit regarding fair use of images in a pictorial history text. It affirmed the United States District Court for the Southern District of New York, which held at trial that the publisher's use of several images of past Grateful Dead concert posters and tickets, reduced considerably, in a timeline of the band's history was a sufficiently transformative use.

The case began during the pre-production of Grateful Dead: The Illustrated Trip, a coffee table book published by Dorling Kindersley (DK) that included a wide variety of information and imagery, presented in a timeline format beginning with the band's 1965 founding. DK had been negotiating licensing terms with the Bill Graham Archives (BGA), whose holdings include many works created to promote Grateful Dead concerts staged by Bill Graham. After the parties could not reach an agreement on terms for seven images to which BGA held the rights, DK nevertheless decided to use them in the book, which was published in October 2003.

BGA sued for copyright infringement in the Southern District. Both parties sought summary judgement. Judge George B. Daniels granted DK's motion for summary judgement in 2005, holding that the use of reduced images to illustrate historic moments in the band's past was sufficiently transformative from their original promotional purpose to make them fair use. On appeal, the Second Circuit's affirmation elaborated on Daniels's reasoning, narrowing his finding that the second factor in the fair use analysis, the nature of the original work, favored BGA, since the transformative use of the works as history limited the relevance of their artistic value. It also distinguished the case from an earlier Second Circuit precedent, limiting the analysis of the fourth factor, the market impact of the allegedly infringing work, to only traditional markets for derivative works. Lastly, it held that a reuser's willingness to license a work does not preclude it from later claiming fair use if it chooses not to.

While Bill Graham Archives has been praised for its limitation on assessing the market impact, it has been criticized for extending a standard of transformative use originally intended to be applied only to parody to all such uses, and expanding the role of the transformative use analysis to the point where it by itself becomes dispositive of the fair-use question.

== Legal background ==
Fair use, the legal doctrine that allows those who do not own the copyright on a work to use it (or at least portions thereof) under certain circumstances, dates to early 18th-century England. It was first recognized by an American court in 1841, with Folsom v. Marsh, a case over a published volume of George Washington's letters in what is now the District of Massachusetts, where Joseph Story, at the time also a justice of the U.S. Supreme Court, recognized its importance to the public good even as he ruled against the defendant claiming it. He identified three factors on which a defendant might prevail when accused of infringement:

- the "nature and objects of the selections made",
- the "quantity and value of the materials used", and
- the degree in which the use may prejudice the sale, or diminish the profits, or supersede the objects, of the original work"

Fair use remained, on those grounds, a purely judicial construction until 1978, when Congress codified them into law with the Copyright Act of 1976. Section 107 formally recognized fair use, based on case law to that point, providing for the same factors Story identified, with the first one split into "the purpose and character of the use" and "the nature of the work". In an influential 1990 Harvard Law Review article, "Toward a Fair Use Standard", Judge Pierre Leval, then sitting on the Southern District of New York, which hears many copyright cases due to the many media companies located in Manhattan, offered guidance on how to interpret the statute based on cases decided under it.

Cases deciding the first factor had turned on a concept Leval identified as transformative use: "[It] must employ the quoted matter in a different manner or for a different purpose than the original ... [using it as] raw material, transformed in the creation of new information, new aesthetics, new insights and understanding." He found this to be consistent with the Constitutional rationale for copyright. Four years later, in Campbell v. Acuff-Rose Music, Inc., a case brought over 2 Live Crew's parody of Roy Orbison's song "Oh, Pretty Woman", the Supreme Court cited Leval's paper and recognized transformative use as something courts could consider in the fair use analysis.

The Southern District had begun considering transformative use claims even before Campbell, in cases involving photocopying. In Basic Books v. Kinko's Graphics Corp., Judge Constance Baker Motley rejected the claim that the defendant chain of copy centers was transforming the plaintiff publishers' works by creating course packs for college classes as the kind of "mere repackaging" Leval had explicitly excluded from transformative use. Leval also rejected the transformative use claimed by the defendant in American Geophysical Union v. Texaco, since its photocopying for the library at its research center "supersede[s] the original and permit duplication, indeed, multiplication ... This kind of copying contributes nothing new or different to the original copyrighted work. It multiplies the number of copies." Leval also held that since the publishers had created a system to license bulk photocopying, and Texaco had other alternatives if it found that system unsatisfactory, the company's copying was harming the market for the original work.

On appeal the Second Circuit affirmed Leval, although with some modifications. Jon Newman, then the circuit's chief judge, wrote that the transformative use inquiry "assesses the value generated by the secondary use and the means by which such value is generated. To the extent that the secondary use involves merely an untransformed duplication, the value generated by the secondary use is little or nothing more than the value that inheres in the original." Newman also affirmed Leval's holding that the existence of a market for the copied articles made Texaco's fair use claim less tenable, logic criticized as circular both by dissenting judge Dennis Jacobs and later academic commentators, who agreed with Jacobs that that logic created a situation where copyright holders could—and did—almost always prevail if they could show the slightest possible market existed.

For the most part the Second Circuit was stingy with transformative use. The use of a large poster of artist Faith Ringgold's work in the background on the set of Roc , a Seinfeld trivia quiz book, and purely decorative eyewear used in a clothing advertisement (in an opinion written by Leval after he was elevated to the Second Circuit) were found not to constitute transformative use. But a parody of Annie Leibovitz's famous Vanity Fair cover photo of a naked and pregnant Demi Moore used as a movie advertisement was held transformative enough to be fair use.

== Underlying dispute ==
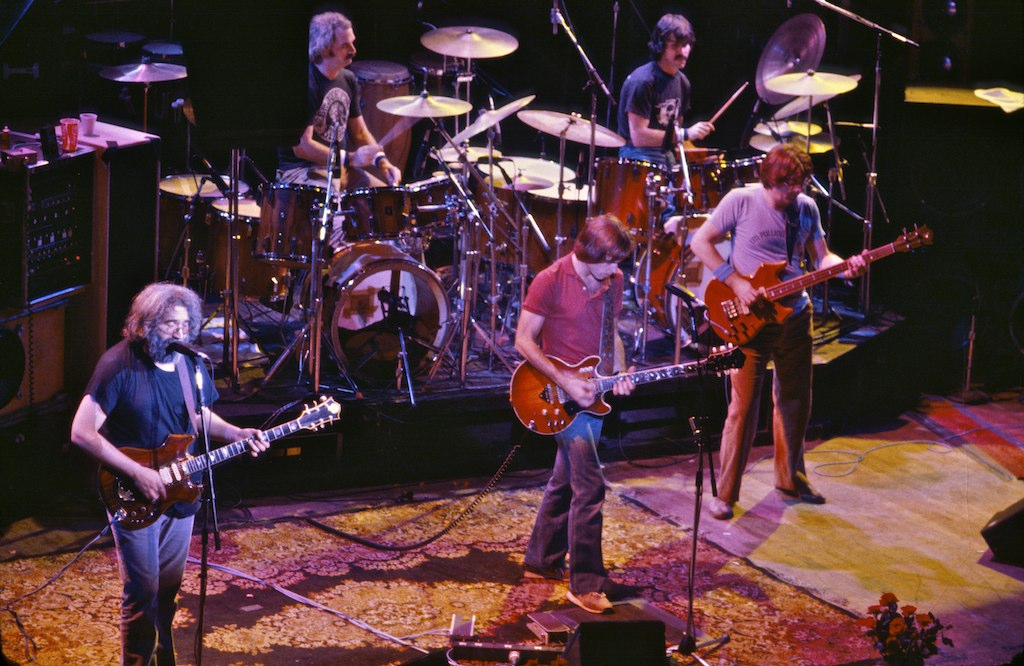
The Grateful Dead on stage in 1980

Founded in 1965, the Grateful Dead became a widely popular rock group over the next two decades, with devoted fans often following them from show to show due to their practice of eschewing a dedicated setlist in favor of extended jams based on their recorded works. The band also permitted fans to record those shows and exchange copies of those recordings with others, even as record companies began aggressively combating the practice generally. As a result a strong connection between the band and its fans developed, perpetuating the 1960s counterculture of the San Francisco Bay Area that defined its early years. The band stopped touring after the 1995 death of founding guitarist Jerry Garcia, but remained popular. In the early 2000s, the band's corporate arm, Grateful Dead Productions (GDP), partnered with publisher Dorling Kindersley (DK), a subsidiary of Penguin Books, for Grateful Dead: The Illustrated Trip, a coffee table book intended to tell the band's history through images and accompanying text.

By 2003, the project was well underway. DK's researcher contacted the Bill Graham Archives (BGA), which had administered the artistic and musical estate of Bill Graham since his death in 1991, describing the proposed book and confirming the participation of the band. The archives owned the copyright on seven images of Dead concert posters and tickets DK sought to include among the many planned and laid out on pages. BGA was willing to license those to DK in exchange for the band granting permission for the release of video and audio of several Dead concerts it also had.

Late that year, as publication approached, the parties had reached agreement on six of the seven images. DK asked for permission for two more, to which BGA responded with a request for $5,000 in fees. Upon seeing a mockup of the pages, BGA noticed that more of its images were included, and informed DK that if it did not reach an agreement with them by the end of the next day it would be initiating legal action.

== District court ==
Trip was published in October 2003. BGA sued DK in the Southern District of New York for copyright infringement, seeking as a remedy an injunction against further sales and destruction of the unsold copies in addition to actual and statutory damages. The case was assigned to Judge George B. Daniels. BGA was represented by attorneys from Thelen Reid, including copyright authority William F. Patry, who had also represented the plaintiffs who had successfully sued Texaco a decade earlier over its unlicensed archival copying. Cowan, Liebowitz & Latman defended DK.

After presenting evidence, both parties moved for summary judgement. While DK had disputed whether BGA actually owned some of the copyrights, its motion was based entirely on fair use, which would moot that issue if granted. BGA in turn argued against fair use. The case was argued before Daniels in January 2005.

Four months later he handed down his opinion, holding in favor of DK's fair-use claim after reviewing all four fair-use factors. On the first, the purpose and character of the use, he noted BGA had not disputed that Trip was a biography of the Dead, telling the story of each month of its 30 active years with images from that time and text commentary on them, the use of third-party copyrighted images was "reasonable and customary", a key standard for fair use, in general. DK's specific use of them here was also transformative, as they had been repurposed from mere promotional and decorative items to illustrations of moments in the band's story.

This, to Daniels, distinguished the case from Ringgold, where the poster had simply served the same purely decorative function as the original artwork. He also found the reduction of the images to further support the claim to transformative use, since while the book was a commercial product, which can mitigate against a fair-use defense under the first factor, their reduction reduced their commercial value and they had not been used to market Trip. Daniels thus held that the first factor favored DK.

On the second factor, the nature of the original work, Daniels found that the posters were creative works, which usually makes fair use harder to assert, but at the same time published, which weighs in favor of fair use. He thus granted BGA a slight edge, although he acknowledged that "in the context of certain transformative uses", courts had found the second factor of minimal relevance to a fair use claim, such as the Leibovitz and Seinfeld cases.

Daniels's analysis of the third factor, the portion and substantiality of the work used, was also brief. In addition to the reduction of the images, which prevented them from fully conveying the "essence" of the original, they were just a few out of the nearly 2,000 in a 480-page book. "Defendants' use was meant to commemorate certain landmark shows in the Grateful Dead's history", Daniels wrote. "While the fact of these shows could be demonstrated without the use of the thumbnail reproductions of the work, the creative nature of the relevant promotional materials could not be conveyed as effectively without the use of several samples of the work in their entirety." This favored DK.

Lastly Daniels made a lengthier analysis of the fourth factor, the effect of the use on the market for the copyrighted work. Circuit precedent limited the markets in which such effect could be considered to those for traditional reproductions and derivative works, and not those for transformative works, so that a copyright holder could not prevent reuse by entering, or declaring intent to enter, any possible market. Accordingly, Daniels characterized BGA's attempt to liken the case to Ringgold by arguing that the existence of any market favors the copyright holder in the fourth-factor analysis as "misplaced", due to the clearly transformative nature of DK's reuse:

It would be unreasonable, however, to find that defendants have unjustly appropriated plaintiff's market. The use of seven posters, as thumbnails, in a 480 page book, does not produce the type of market harm recognized by the fair use inquiry. The thumbnails are not substitutes for the posters themselves; nor would a collector purchase this book rather than one dedicated to the posters or even copies of the posters themselves.

The only cognizable harm BGA could assert, Daniels continued, was the loss of licensing revenues. Again he found DK's transformative use to offset this, notwithstanding BGA's claims for the established market for licensing visual reproductions in books and its fears that use like DK's, if permitted, would devastate the value of the copyrights it owned. "This overstates the consequence of a finding of fair use in this instance which would permit reduced reproductions, which cannot supplant the market for the original, and are used for a fundamentally different purpose than the original", Daniels remarked. Accordingly he awarded the fourth factor to DK.

Courts may consider other factors besides those four in evaluating fair use, and Daniels made some remarks about whether DK had been acting in good faith. In Campbell, he noted, the Supreme Court had commented that in cases where a license is ultimately unnecessary will still negotiate with the rights holder as a way to avoid litigation and its costs. "The fact that defendants' informed plaintiff of their intentions to use their images and made an effort to license the images where there might be question as to whether a license was needed, shows a good faith effort by defendants", which also helped their cause. Daniels concluded by granting DK's motion and denying BGA's.

== Appellate court ==
BGA appealed to the Second Circuit, which has appellate jurisdiction over the Southern District. Certiorari was granted and circuit judges Amalya Kearse and Reena Raggi were impaneled to hear the case, with Jane Restani, Chief Judge of the United States Court of International Trade, sitting by designation. It heard arguments in January 2006 and handed down its decision, affirming the district court's finding of fair use, four months later.

Restani wrote for a unanimous panel that affirmed every aspect of Daniels's decision in the face of counterarguments BGA had made, and went into greater detail on some of them. In the first-factor analysis, the archives had disputed the transformative-use finding on two grounds: first, that simply arranging images in chronological order, with no commentary specific to the artistic or creative nature of the image, did not constitute transformative use, and second, that DK had not been required to offer a justification for its use of each image.

"Originally, each of BGA's images fulfilled the dual purposes of artistic expression and promotion. The posters were apparently widely distributed to generate public interest in the Grateful Dead and to convey information to a large number people about the band's forthcoming concerts", Restani wrote. "In contrast, DK used each of BGA's images as historical artifacts to document and represent the actual occurrence of Grateful Dead concert events featured on Illustrated Trip's timeline."

The 1980 Radio City Music Hall promotional poster

Some of the image reuses actually served, Restani noted, to "[enhance] the reader's understanding of the biographical text." In a footnote, she pointed to one, a poster commemorating a special 15th anniversary concert series by the band at Radio City Music Hall in New York. (Note: Recordings from these shows, and a companion series at San Francisco's Warfield Theater, were eventually released as two live albums: Reckoning (acoustic performances) and Dead Set (electric).) It showed two giant skeletons, iconography commonly associated with the band, standing next to the theater. Management there was unfamiliar with that use and thought the band was implying that Radio City was soon going to close down, leading to a lawsuit that was withdrawn after the band's management explained the imagery. (Note: The situation was more complex than Trip represented it as being. The shows at Radio City were among the first by rock acts at the venue, which like many New York City institutions had fallen into decline and neglect during the 1970s; the Rockefeller Corporation hoped that the shows would help revive Radio City's fortunes. They were unprepared for the interest a series of Dead shows would generate. When tickets went on sale, fans lined up down the street, blocking the doors of many Rockefeller Center buildings and making it difficult for workers there to enter. Many were reportedly openly using drugs, which also caused the Rockefeller executives great distress. Upon seeing the poster, they evaluated it against the venue's recent difficulties, and ordered the band not to sell any more. The lawsuit alleged that the band had also infringed the venue's trademark by using the facade of Radio City without Rockefeller's consent. It was ultimately settled with the band agreeing to destroy the 2,500 remaining unsold posters; however the band's archivist was unable to bring herself to actually do it and simply said she had. The remaining posters were rediscovered later.) Other images, while they might not have directly enhanced the text, nevertheless served to "graphically [represent] the fact of significant Grateful Dead concert events selected by the Illustrated Trip's author for inclusion in the book's timeline." She noted how one, of a Winterland Ballroom show in the late 1960s, conveyed a fact not mentioned in the accompanying text: that at that point in their career the Dead were still getting second billing to Jefferson Airplane.

On the second factor, the nature of the work, DK challenged Daniels's finding that it favored BGA, since the posters combined artistic and factual expression and had been widely disseminated for many years. BGA for its part disputed the limited weight given this factor by the district court. Restani agreed with Daniels that they were primarily creative works but that that was of limited value in the fair-use analysis due to the transformative use DK made.

As with the first factor, the reduction in image size, per the Ninth Circuit's decision in Kelly v. Arriba Soft Corp. several years before, helped make a case for fair use under the third factor, the portion and substantiality of the work used. "Even though the copyrighted images are copied in their entirety," Restani wrote, "the visual impact of their artistic expression is significantly limited." She also saw the images' inclusion among text and other graphics, some original to the book, as further diluting their impact on it.

The parties had agreed, Restani wrote when considering the fourth factor, market impact, that the reduced images did not impact BGA's existing licensing market for originals and full-size reproductions of the poster. What BGA did claim to be adversely affected was its market for licensing the images to be reproduced in books, pointing to other images with third-party copyrights that DK had paid for their reuse in Trip. After rejecting the claim that the loss of licensing revenues BGA would have collected had DK agreed to its terms constituted a cognizable harm by itself, since that is true to some degree in every claim of copyright infringement, Restani distinguished the case from Texaco: "[Since] we hold that DK's use of BGA's images is transformatively different from their original expressive purpose ... a copyright holder cannot prevent others from entering fair use markets merely 'by developing or licensing a market for parody, news reporting, educational or other transformative uses of its own creative work.' ... Since DK's use of BGA's images falls within a transformative market, BGA does not suffer market harm due to the loss of license fees." She further noted that in Texaco, the court had found direct losses to the plaintiff academic journal publishers from the articles copied, as the copies were being used for the same purpose as the original, whereas DK was using its copies for a different purpose.

Lastly, Restani addressed BGA's argument that DK could not claim fair use for images it made a good-faith effort to properly license:"[A] publisher's willingness to pay license fees for reproduction of images does not establish that the publisher may not, in the alternative, make fair use of those images." Weighing all the factors, she like Daniels found them favoring DK, and thus affirmed his decision.

== Subsequent jurisprudence ==
Bill Graham Archives has helped other courts, mostly in the Southern District and Second Circuit, decide later cases where transformative use, particularly through reduction of images or alleged repurposing of the image, was argued. Two years after it was decided, Judge Sidney H. Stein of the Southern District followed Bill Graham Archives in holding the use of 15 seconds of John Lennon's song "Imagine" in the film Expelled: No Intelligence Allowed could not be considered to affect the market for reuse of the song as it was transformative use. The following year, Judge William C. Conner distinguished AT&T's claim that short clips of copyrighted songs it played to mobile phone customers shopping for ringtones and ringback tones were analogous to the reduced images of the Dead's concert posters by observing that the purpose of the musical clips was purely commercial, to entice a customer to buy the tone.

Photographer Michael Grecco sued Valuewalk, a website that reused without permission or attribution a photo he took of bond trader Jeffrey Gundlach for Barron's in 2011 for its online directory of major figures on Wall Street. Among many other defenses, Valuewalk claimed transformative use similar to Bill Graham Archives in that it had not just used the photo but had set it on a webpage alongside information and links to articles about Gundlach, including the one Grecco's photograph had appeared in. Judge Gregory H. Woods did not accept that argument. "No reasonable juror would find that any changes Defendants made, if any, amounted to the significance of the changes made in Bill Graham Archives", he wrote. "Barron's hired Grecco to create the photograph to illustrate a biographical article on Gundlach, the same exact purpose for which Valuewalk used the image." (Note: While Woods granted summary judgement on fair use to Grecco, other issues presented factual disputes.)

In 2018 tattoo artist Catherine Alexander sued Take-Two Interactive over its use of six of her works on the body of professional wrestler Randy Orton as represented in its video game WWE 2K. Since the tattoos served the same decorative function in the game as they did in real life, the artist argued that they were not used transformatively. Take-Two pointed to Bill Graham Archives in response, noting that the tattoos were greatly reduced and sometimes difficult to clearly make out in the game. Judge Staci M. Yandle of the Southern District of Illinois denied Take-Two's motion for summary judgement, saying that unlike Bill Graham Archives this was a dispute of material fact to be resolved at trial. (Note: Yandle also granted Alexander's motion for partial summary judgement on the copying issue, leaving fair use the only issue to try. In 2022 Yandle ultimately decided the case in Alexander's favor.)

"The Second Circuit's decision in Bill Graham all but decides this case", wrote Southern District Judge Valerie Caproni in 2020 when dismissing a lawsuit against the Metropolitan Museum of Art over its use of a copyrighted photo of Eddie Van Halen performing in the online catalog of an exhibit on instruments used by rock musicians. She found the Met's use of the photo "analogous" to DK's use of the Dead posters: it repurposed the image by focusing on the guitar rather than the guitarist, and made up an "inconsequential portion" of the total exhibit.

== Analysis and commentary ==
Jeannine Marques wrote in a 2007 Berkeley Technology Law Journal article that with Bill Graham Archives and its contemporary Blanch v. Koons, (Note: In that case, fashion photographer Andrea Blanch had sued appropriation artist Jeff Koons over his use of part of a photograph of a model's lower legs she had taken for a magazine article in a collage including many other images, where Koons had not only taken the woman's legs without their background but rotated them. Koons prevailed due to a finding of transformative use.) the Second Circuit had made a statement that transformative use was very important within the fair-use inquiry. Both cases had extended fair use beyond those uses specifically enumerated in the preamble to §107 of the Copyright Act and accounting for transformative use in each factor of the analysis. They had found the expressive purposes of the works (as opposed to mere functional purposes) relevant to the analysis, balanced a low degree of aesthetic transformation with a recontextualization of the original work, and found that a high degree of transformation minimized market harm. "[I]n both cases," she observed, "the transformative test seems to have shifted the focus of the fair use analysis from providing economic incentives for copyright owners to stimulating the production of new works."

It was unclear whether, under these precedents, the Second Circuit would have decided Ringgold the way it did, Marques suggested. Bill Graham Archives had limited the scope of the fourth-factor analysis to only traditional markets, whereas in Ringgold the court had found the mere fact that the artist had marketed copies of the posters sufficient, not reaching the transformative market for the use of her work as set decorations in television shows and movies. The two decisions might be useful for documentary filmmakers, who frequently have to remove scenes where even short snippets of copyrighted music are used incidentally, even unintentionally, since the publishers regularly charge licensing fees out of range of the low budgets such films are made under. Appropriation artists, as well as Internet users, could also benefit, Marques added.

But, Marques cautioned, the two cases "neither establish a bright line rule of fair use nor blow the fair use door wide open ... The broader transformative test still permits enough leeway for courts to exercise discretion on how to focus the fair use analysis-on transformation or on economic harm to a plaintiff." That discretion, she wrote, could be exercised more broadly in cases where second-factor analysis found expressive purposes in both the original work and the reuse. In courts such as the Sixth Circuit known for more conservative approaches that generally favored copyright holders, that might lead potential reusers such as the documentarians she had discussed to continue avoiding situations where they might have to prove fair use in court, courts that might find precedents such as Bill Graham Archives limited to the specific facts of those cases. And even if filmmakers believed the law favored their reuse, financial backers and insurers (Note: Some rebroadcasters of films, such as the CBS television network, require proof that the production was covered by errors and omissions insurance, which would pay the cost of copyright litigation. To avoid that wherever possible, insurers insist that all rights that can possibly be cleared with the holder are, even if there is a strong likelihood that fair use can be asserted.) might feel differently.

UCLA law professor Neil Weinstock Netanel agreed in 2011 that Bill Graham Archives "represents a cornerstone in lower courts' belated embrace of the transformative use doctrine". He nevertheless found its finding that transformative use obviates the need to consider market harm "striking" since the archives did, in fact, license reduced images for use in books and was willing to license to DK on the terms the two had agreed on. Many observers thought the case an "aberration" that would be overruled en banc or ignored, until Blanch.

In a 2015 Fordham Intellectual Property, Media & Entertainment Law Journal article, copyright lawyer Kim G. Landsman identified where he thought the Bill Graham Archives court had erred in a way that expanded transformative use. In its second-factor analysis, it had quoted from Campbell to justify the limited weight it gave that factor, as "[not] likely to help much in separating the fair use sheep from the infringing goats". But, Landsman pointed out, in that passage the Supreme Court was referring to parody, the issue in the case, specifically, not transformative use generally as Restani's wording had suggested.

A decade after the decision, another commentator, Christina Alvarado, wrote about the case in the SMU Science and Technology Law Review. While she found the fair-use holding correct, she criticized the court for failing to fully define the scope of transformative use, compounding an error made by the Supreme Court in Campbell. "[T]he court's express adoption of transformative use analysis under the first fair use factor created a misleading impression as to the effects of Judge Leval's concept on the entire fair use balance", since it had incorporated it across the entire analysis, she wrote, while Leval had expressly confined it to the first factor. Campbell had indeed implied that transformative use could play a role outside the first factor, but while Daniels had accepted that the Second Circuit had missed the opportunity to elaborate.

This resulted in an "unbalanced" application of the four factors in Bill Graham Archives, Alvarado wrote. Once transformative use was found in the first-factor analysis, the court went beyond the bounds of the Copyright Act and minimized the weight of the second factor, even as it awarded it to the archives. This had two effects that, she warned, could skew future cases: while a transformative use finding might well prove, as it had in Bill Graham Archives, to effectively decide the case for fair use, its absence might prove fatal to a defendant with a strong case on the other three factors.

== See also ==
- Cariou v. Prince, 2013 Second Circuit fair-use case criticized as expanding the scope of transformative use too far.
- Google v. Oracle, 2021 Supreme Court decision on transformative use of computer code.
- Andy Warhol Foundation for the Visual Arts, Inc. v. Goldsmith, 2023 Supreme Court decision, appealed from Second Circuit, limiting scope of transformative use
