= Blanch v. Koons =

American copyright lawsuit

- Court: United States Court of Appeals for the Second Circuit
- Full case name: Andrea Blanch v. Jeff Koons, Deutsche Bank AG and the Solomon R. Guggenheim Foundation
- Decided: October 26, 2006
- Citation: 467 F.3d 244

Case history
- Prior actions: Leave to amend complaint, 329 F.Supp.2d 568 (2004); summary judgement for defense, 396 F.Supp.2d 476 (2005)
- Appealed from: S.D.N.Y.
- Subsequent actions: Cross-motions for attorney's fees and sanctions denied, 485 F.Supp.2d 516 (2007)

Court membership
- Judges sitting: Robert D. Sack, Robert Katzmann and John Garvan Murtha

Case opinions
- Defendant artist's use of portion of plaintiff's photograph in collage was fair use since it transformed it by placing her work in a new context that created new meaning, did not use all of her work and had no impact on the market for it since she had never licensed any of her work and had no plans to. Southern District of New York affirmed.
- Decision by: Sack
- Concurrence: Katzmann

Blanch v. Koons, 467 F.3d 244, is a copyright case decided by the United States Court of Appeals for the Second Circuit in 2006. Fashion photographer Andrea Blanch sued appropriation artist Jeff Koons for copyright infringement after he used an image of a woman's lower legs taken from one of her photographs in a collage of his own. Koons claimed fair use, arguing he had transformed it sufficiently from its original purpose through his reuse. It is considered a significant case in addressing the latter issue.

Blanch brought the action in the United States District Court for the Southern District of New York after seeing the legs from her image, shot for a 2000 article in Allure, used in Niagara, a collage by Koons exhibited at the Guggenheim Museum in 2001, without her permission. Judge Louis Stanton held for Koons in 2005, finding that three of the four factors used to determine fair use were favorable to Koons and the other one was neutral. On appeal, the Second Circuit affirmed the following year, with Judge Robert D. Sack writing for a unanimous panel that found Koons's fair-use claim even stronger. Judge Robert Katzmann, in a concurrence, criticized the court for attempting to assert broader principles rather than limiting its decision to the specific facts of the case, which he believed the better approach.

The case has been contrasted with another suit against Koons 15 years earlier, in which he was found liable by the Second Circuit for infringing a photograph with a sculpture based on it. At that time transformative use, a concept developed in a law review paper by Judge Pierre Leval, then sitting on the Southern District, had not become widely understood and accepted in copyright litigation outside cases involving parody, the context in which the U.S. Supreme Court had accepted it in 1995's Campbell v. Acuff-Rose Music, Inc. Blanch was one of several cases in the mid-2000s where judges of the Southern District and Second Circuit, who hear many copyright cases, reversed that trend and began more broadly accepting transformative use as a defense to infringement claims.

Scholarly commentary has focused on the deference the case showed Koons's stated intent compared to the earlier case. It has also been seen as accepting a postmodern understanding of fair use which gives equal weight to the context of the use and its reception, along with the reuser's intent, in determining whether a use is sufficiently transformative.

== Background ==
=== Fair use and transformative use ===
Fair use, the legal doctrine that allows those who do not own the copyright on a work to use it (or at least portions thereof) under certain circumstances, dates to early 18th-century England. It was first recognized by an American court in 1841, with Folsom v. Marsh, a case over a published volume of George Washington's letters in what is now the District of Massachusetts, where Joseph Story, at the time also a justice of the U.S. Supreme Court, recognized its importance to the public good even as he ruled against the defendant claiming it. He identified three factors on which a defendant might prevail when accused of infringement:

- the "nature and objects of the selections made",
- the "quantity and value of the materials used", and
- the degree in which the use may prejudice the sale, or diminish the profits, or supersede the objects, of the original work"

Fair use remained, on those grounds, a purely judicial construction until 1978, when Congress codified them into law with the Copyright Act of 1976. Section 107 formally recognized fair use, based on case law to that point, providing for the same factors Story identified, with the first one split into "the purpose and character of the use" and "the nature of the work". In an influential 1990 Harvard Law Review article, "Toward a Fair Use Standard", Judge Pierre Leval, then sitting on the Southern District of New York, which hears many copyright cases due to the many media companies located in Manhattan, offered guidance on how to interpret the statute based on cases decided under it.

Cases deciding the first factor had turned on a concept Leval identified as transformative use: "[It] must employ the quoted matter in a different manner or for a different purpose than the original ... [using it as] raw material, transformed in the creation of new information, new aesthetics, new insights and understanding." He found this to be consistent with the Constitutional rationale for copyright. Four years later, in Campbell v. Acuff-Rose Music, Inc., a case brought over 2 Live Crew's parody of Roy Orbison's "Oh, Pretty Woman", the Supreme Court cited Leval's paper and recognized transformative use as something courts could consider in the fair use analysis.

The Southern District had begun considering transformative use claims even before Campbell, in cases involving photocopying. In Basic Books v. Kinko's Graphics Corp., Judge Constance Baker Motley rejected the claim that the defendant chain of copy centers was transforming the plaintiff publishers' works by creating course packs for college classes as the kind of "mere repackaging" Leval had explicitly excluded from transformative use. In 1993 the concept was acknowledged at the appellate level in Twin Peaks Productions v. Publications International Ltd., where detailed plot summaries of episodes of a television show were likewise held insufficiently transformative since they were not used as the basis for commentary and could reasonably serve to substitute for watching the show. Leval also rejected the transformative use claimed by the defendant in deciding American Geophysical Union v. Texaco at trial, since its photocopying for the library at its research center "supersede[s] the original and permit duplication, indeed, multiplication ... This kind of copying contributes nothing new or different to the original copyrighted work. It multiplies the number of copies." Leval also held that since the publishers had created a system to license bulk photocopying, and Texaco had other alternatives if it found that system unsatisfactory, the company's copying was harming the market for the original work.

On appeal the Second Circuit affirmed Leval, although with some modifications. Jon Newman, then the circuit's chief judge, who had also written the Twin Peaks opinion, wrote that the transformative use inquiry "assesses the value generated by the secondary use and the means by which such value is generated. To the extent that the secondary use involves merely an untransformed duplication, the value generated by the secondary use is little or nothing more than the value that inheres in the original." Newman also affirmed Leval's holding that the existence of a market for the copied articles made Texaco's fair use claim less tenable, logic criticized as circular both by dissenting judge Dennis Jacobs and later academic commentators, who agreed with Jacobs that that logic created a situation where copyright holders could—and did—almost always prevail if they could show the slightest possible market existed.

For the most part the Second Circuit was stingy with transformative use. The use of a large poster of artist Faith Ringgold's work in the background on the set of Roc, a Seinfeld trivia quiz book, and purely decorative eyewear used in a clothing advertisement (in an opinion written by Leval after he was elevated to the Second Circuit) were found not to constitute transformative use. But a parody of Annie Leibovitz's famous Vanity Fair cover photo of a naked and pregnant Demi Moore used as a movie advertisement was held transformative enough to be fair use.

=== Appropriation art ===
In the latter decades of the 20th century, pop artists like Andy Warhol and Robert Rauschenberg reacted to consumer culture and the increasing amount of mass-produced imagery in the media, particularly advertising, by using those images in their own art, sometimes as their own, a practice termed "appropriation art". In two instances this led to lawsuits. Warhol settled a 1966 claim brought by the photographer whose image he had used as the basis of his Flowers Series. Fourteen years later Rauschenberg similarly settled with a photographer whose work he had used; (Note: Prior to 1978 copyright suits were often difficult for plaintiffs as they had to both prove they had published the work before the alleged infringement and registered with the Copyright Office in a timely fashion. The photographer settled because he was unsure of success on those grounds and because he could not spend as much on legal representation as Rauschenberg.) until then he had argued fair use with arguments similar to those now accepted as transformative use.

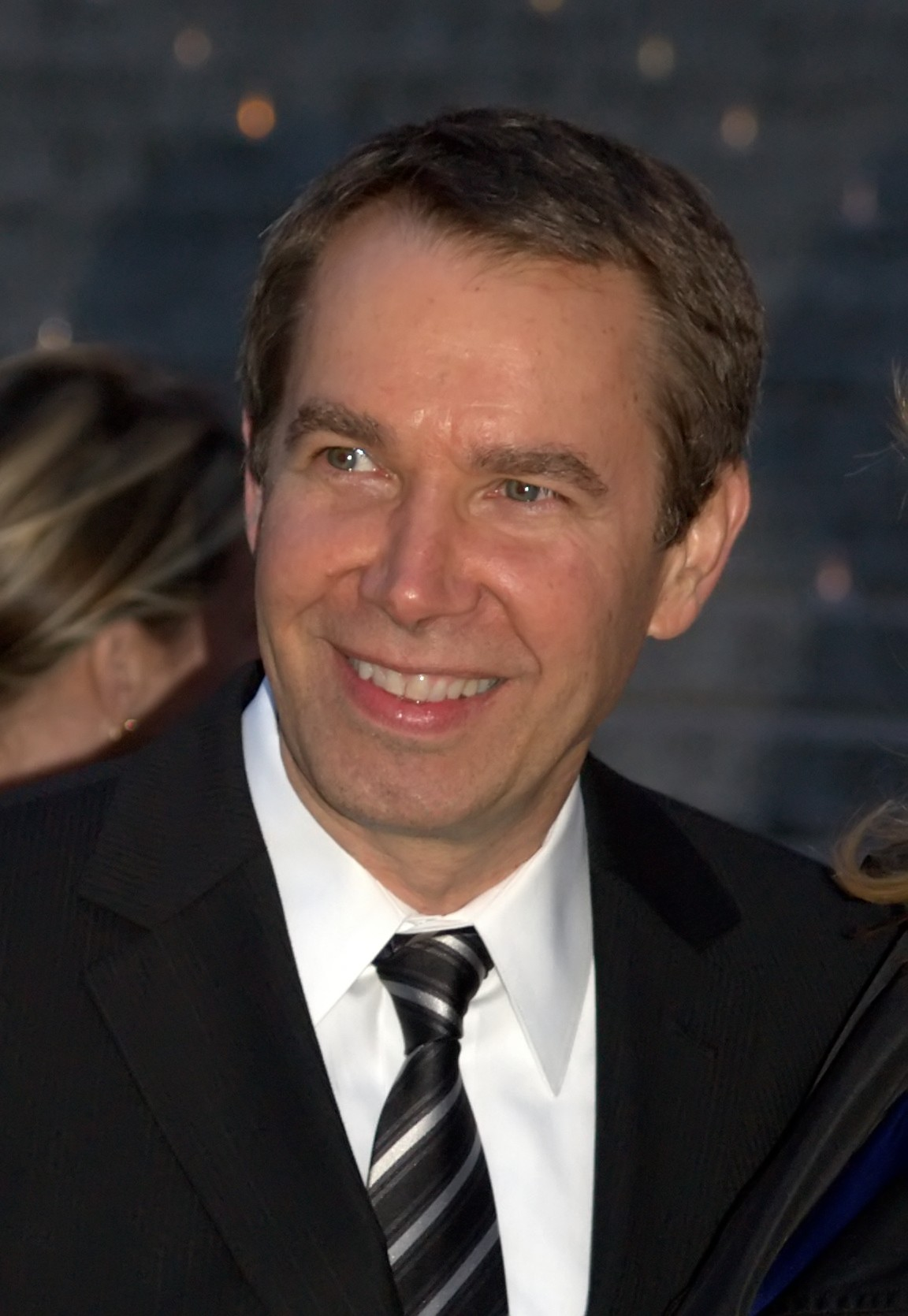
Jeff Koons, in 2009

Jeff Koons became prominent in the art scene during the 1980s, relying on repurposing the work of others, likewise drawing suit. A sculpture recreating a postcard that Koons had found and torn the copyright notice off was held not to be fair use by the Second Circuit Court of Appeals in Rogers v. Koons, since it was so similar to the original as to make it "difficult to discern" the parody Koons claimed his work was. He lost at trial the next year over his unauthorized use of Odie from the Garfield comic strip. Neither case considered transformative use; they were decided after Leval's paper but before Campbell.

== Underlying dispute ==
In 2000, Andrea Blanch, a veteran fashion photographer whose work had been published in many magazines and books of her own, was commissioned by Allure magazine to take pictures that would illustrate an article about glittery nail polish. While the magazine's creative director suggested the model to use, the brand of nail polish and the jewel-encrusted silk Gucci sandals she wore, Blanch chose the camera and film and lit the scene based on her years of experience. She came up with the idea to pose the model's feet, her legs crossed, on a man's legs in an airplane seat, to give it a slightly erotic sensibility. A picture of the model's feet in tight closeup was used in the magazine's July issue of that year; Blanch was paid US$750 ($1,400 in 2025).

That same year, Deutsche Bank and the Guggenheim Museum commissioned a series of works for $2 million ($3.74 million in 2024) from Koons, whose work, controversial within the art world at the time of Rogers, had since become more accepted and commanded higher prices from buyers. Koons responded with seven large (10-by-14-foot (3.0 by 4.3 m)) canvases, the "Easyfun-Ethereal" series, all of them collages of images meant to comment on how basic human appetites are mediated by mass-produced images. The fourth in the series, Niagara, was topped with four sets of women's lower legs in high-heeled shoes appearing to dangle down from the top of the frame, above a backdrop showing Niagara Falls, amid images of desserts. Second from left among the legs were those from Blanch's photo, cut out from their background.

Blanch's original (left) and as reused in Koons's work (second pair of legs from left)

The "Easyfun-Ethereal" works were exhibited first at the Deutsche Guggenheim in Berlin during 2001, and later that year at the main Guggenheim in New York. While at the latter, Blanch decided to take a look despite not being particularly interested in Koons's work. When she saw legs in Niagara, she was flattered at the artist's choice of her photo even though she had not granted permission or been notified. She did not consider suing him until a friend of hers who had encountered Koons at a party recounted the artist's fraught reaction when she had told him about it. Blanch realized that Koons had knowingly appropriated her image without asking, and brought suit alleging copyright infringement.

== Litigation ==
=== District court ===
Blanch named Koons, Deutsche Bank and the Solomon R. Guggenheim Foundation as defendants. Her case was assigned to Judge Louis Stanton of the United States District Court for the Southern District of New York. Before trial, Stanton had to resolve a difference between the parties when the defendants objected to Blanch's motion to file an amended complaint seeking punitive damages, arguing that that remedy was unavailable in copyright-infringement cases. But Stanton ruled that two recent cases in the Southern District had not only held that the Copyright Act did not bar punitive damages as a matter of law but that they could be sought in cases where the plaintiff could prove the copying was willful and/or maliciously done. He allowed Blanch to file an amended complaint seeking punitive damages, even as he noted that as a matter of law she was probably unlikely to prevail on the issue as she had not registered her photo, now titled "Silk Sandals", with the Copyright Office until shortly before filing suit. But he wanted her to be able to present the facts.

The parties took depositions and filed evidence and arguments over the next year, culminating in Koons moving for summary judgement. In November 2005 Stanton granted the request, holding Koons had made fair use of Blanch's image. Stanton held that all four factors used to judge fair use under the Copyright Act of 1976 favored the artist. "I believe the answer to the question of justification turns primarily on whether, and to what extent, the challenged use is transformative", he wrote in considering the first factor, the purpose and character of the use. After quoting extensively from Koons's deposition testimony about his choice to use Blanch's photo, Stanton observed:

No original creative or imaginative aspect of Blanch's photograph was included in Koons' painting. The use Koons made of the only items he copied—the crossed legs, feet and sandals—was different from their use in the photograph, whose purpose was to illustrate metallic nail polish. The painting's use does not "supersede" or duplicate the objective of the original, but uses it as raw material in a novel context to create new information, new aesthetics, and new insights. Such use, whether successful or not artistically, is transformative.

Therefore the first factor favored Koons.

On the second factor, the nature of the copyrighted work, Stanton found it creative and thus "sufficiently creative and original to receive copyright protection". At the same time it had been published widely in a nationally distributed magazine, weighing in favor of fair use. Further, the appearance of the sandals, "perhaps the most striking element of the photograph", was not within Blanch's copyright on the image, and Koons had other than that taken only the legs, a "banal" element of Blanch's image by themselves. The second factor also went to Koons.

For this reason, the parties had stipulated that the third factor, the portion and substantiality of the work used, was neutral, Stanton wrote. He agreed, noting that if the model's crossed legs alone, which took up much of Blanch's photos, were considered, this factor would favor Blanch. However, copyright protects the expression but not the idea, and crossed lower legs were "not sufficiently original to deserve much copyright protection".

Lastly was the impact, real and potential, of Niagara on the market for Blanch's image. The test was whether the former could serve as a substitute for the latter. Stanton found that not only was it not, it could not: "Niagara's market is one the photograph had no chance to capture." He therefore again found in Koons's favor. Blanch had also raised Rogers' and several other cases stemming from that series of works where Koons had been found liable for infringement, but Stanton distinguished them as factually different and thus inapposite to her case. Since three of the four factors in the fair-use analysis favored Koons, it was not necessary to consider any other arguments on either side, and thus granted summary judgement to Koons.

=== Appeals court ===
Blanch appealed to the Second Circuit, which has appellate jurisdiction over the Southern District. Judges Robert D. Sack and Robert Katzmann were empaneled to hear the case, along with Judge John Garvan Murtha of the District of Vermont, sitting by designation. They heard oral arguments in May 2006 and decided the case late that year, affirming Stanton's holding for Koons.

Sack wrote for the panel. He recounted the facts of the case at greater length than Stanton had, noting Blanch's testimony that she had never licensed any of her photos for reuse, nor did she have plans to, and that Koons's reuse of the image in Niagara had not caused her economic harm she could identify. Sack took note of Harper & Row's precedent allowing a court to consider and rule on fair use in considering a summary judgement motion where no facts were disputed by either parties, and considered the four fair-use factors.

Sack broke the first-factor test down into transformative, commercial use and parody sections. On the first, "Koons does not argue that his use was transformative solely because Blanch's work is a photograph and his a painting, or because Blanch's photograph is in a fashion magazine and his painting is displayed in museums", he observed, noting circuit precedent that declined to find transformative use on such minimal grounds. "But [he] asserts—and Blanch does not deny—that his purposes in using Blanch's image are sharply different from Blanch's goals in creating it ... [He] is, by his own undisputed description, using Blanch's image as fodder for his commentary on the social and aesthetic consequences of mass media." That considerable departure from her purpose led the court to find transformative use in Koons's work.

Again citing precedent, Sack held that that transformative use was enough for the court to discount the clear commercial purpose of Koons's work, notwithstanding the vastly larger sum he made from the work compared to Blanch. In addition, "[n]otwithstanding the fact that artists are sometimes paid and museums sometimes earn money, the public exhibition of art is widely and we think properly considered to 'have value that benefits the broader public interest.'" On the parody issue, Sack found Niagara more in the vein of what Campbell defined as "satire", not dependent on any single work and thus less entitled to substantial copying: "[I]ts message appears to target the genre of which Silk Sandals is typical, rather than the individual photograph itself". He noted that the Second Circuit had applied the principles of Campbell, a case that involved a song parody, "in too many non-parody cases to require citation for the proposition that [its] broad principles ... are not limited to cases involving parody." But that still required making the distinction, and Koons had in his deposition provided a justification for his copying that the court found adequate and that Blanch had not offered any response to:

I considered them to be necessary for inclusion in my painting rather than legs I might have photographed myself. The ubiquity of the photograph is central to my message. The photograph is typical of a certain style of mass communication. Images almost identical to them can be found in almost any glossy magazine, as well as in other media. To me, the legs depicted in the Allure photograph are a fact in the world, something that everyone experiences constantly; they are not anyone's legs in particular. By using a fragment of the Allure photograph in my painting, I thus comment upon the culture and attitudes promoted and embodied in Allure Magazine. By using an existing image, I also ensure a certain authenticity or veracity that enhances my commentary—it is the difference between quoting and paraphrasing—and ensure that the viewer will understand what I am referring to.

Blanch had also alleged Koons demonstrated bad faith by not asking her for permission. "We are aware of no controlling authority to the effect that the failure to seek permission for copying, in itself, constitutes bad faith", Sack responded, citing cases (including Rogers) where findings of bad faith had relied on additional acts. Having considered all the issues involved in the purpose and character of the use, the court affirmed Stanton's finding the first factor for Koons.

Since Blanch's photo had been published, that favored fair use under the second factor, the nature of the copyrighted work. But while the court disagreed with Stanton's assessment of it as "banal", finding it creative enough to merit copyright protection, it held that the second factor, which under these findings favored Blanch, was per Campbell and the circuit's own recent decision in Bill Graham Archives v. Dorling Kindersley, Ltd., had "limited weight" in the fair-use inquiry when the work was sufficiently transformative. For the third factor, the portion of the original work used, Sack noted in addition to being within the bounds of Koons's stated intent, his use of the model's legs and sandals had excised from the image two of the most significant elements she had brought to the photograph, the man's lap and the surrounding airline seat and cabin. For that reason, the court held the third factor in Koons's favor.

On market impact, the fourth factor, Sack's discussion was again brief, but went further than Stanton's. Blanch testified that she had never licensed the photo, or indeed any of her photos, for any reuse. Nor had Koons's reuse affected her career in any way she could identify. The photo had not lost any value. "In light of these admissions," Sack wrote, "it is plain that 'Niagara' had no deleterious effect 'upon the potential market for or value of the copyrighted work.'" The fourth factor thus went to Koons, as well.

With three of the four factors decidedly weighing for Koons, and the second factor of limited importance, "we therefore conclude that neither he nor the other defendants engaged in or are liable for copyright infringement", Sack concluded. The panel affirmed Stanton's decision.

==== Concurrence ====
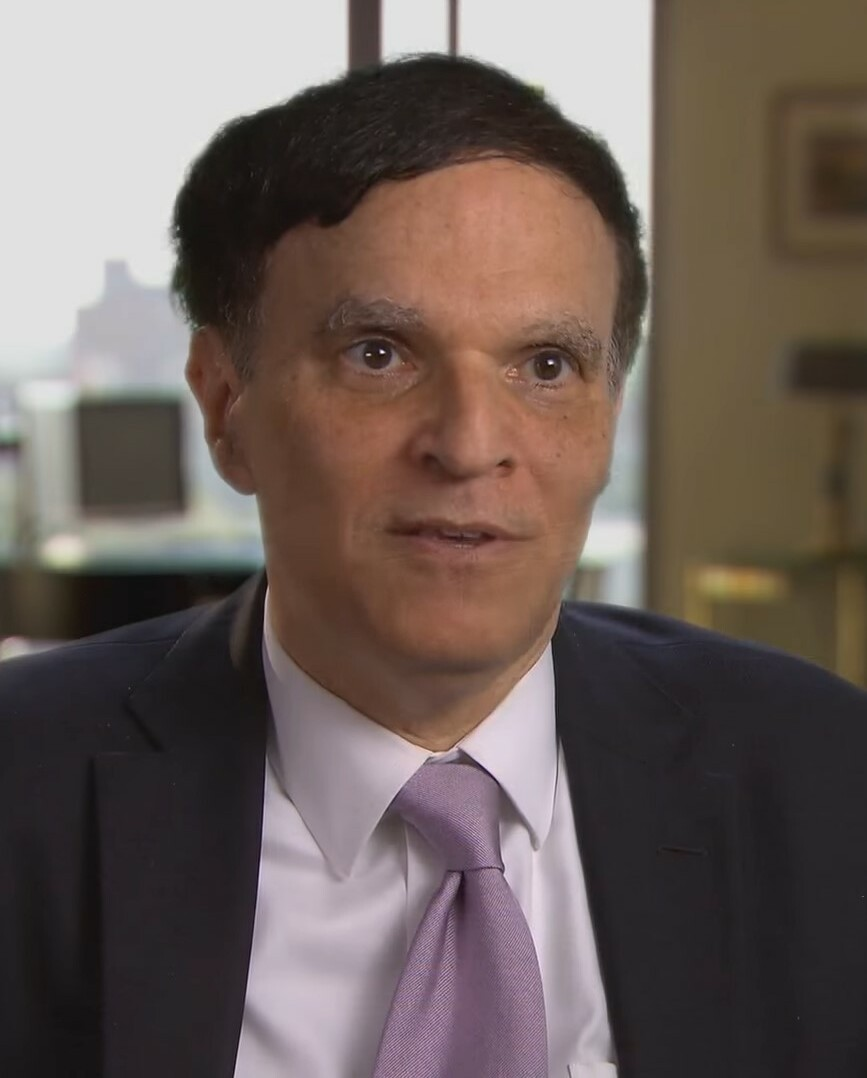
Judge Katzmann, in 2017

Katzmann agreed with the panel's general holding on fair use, particularly the fourth-factor analysis that showed no market impact since Blanch did not make money from the reuse of her work, unlike the plaintiff in Rogers. But, he continued, "I respectfully part company with the majority opinion, however, because I believe it sweeps more broadly in several places than is necessary to decide this simple case." One such area was the majority's decision to discount the secondary commercial use, which he said misread the court's similar holding in NXIVM Corp. v. The Ross Institute. He distinguished the secondary use in that case (education about the plaintiff's cultish aspects) as one specifically enumerated in the preamble to the statute outlining the fair use factors, whereas Koons's was not. Instead, the court should have looked to Texaco, "our established analysis for weighing commercialism", where the defendants' copying of the articles in the plaintiffs' journals was not directly linked to their gain from that use. The court should have simply distinguished the two cases, noting that "the copying of Blanch's work was simply one small part of what made Koons' work so valuable rather than the heart of the enterprise."

Katzmann also felt that the majority had unnecessarily elevated the dictum in Campbell that "failure to seek authorization, even where doing so would have been feasible, is not relevant to the fair-use inquiry." Since the question of whether a good-faith effort to license the work barred fair use was not settled and the case did not require an effort to do so, the court should have left it alone. (Note: In Bill Graham Archives, decided a few months prior, the circuit had held similarly despite the defendants having been in active negotiations to license the images at the time they decided to use them under fair use: "[A] publisher's willingness to pay license fees for reproduction of images does not establish that the publisher may not, in the alternative, make fair use of those images.") Rather, "whatever bad faith Koons may have exhibited in this case, as well as the limited commercial nature of his use, would not outweigh the much stronger considerations pointing toward a finding of fair use". Katzmann concluded. He did not disagree with the majority's principles, and said he might adopt them in a future case if the facts called for it.

This is our Circuit's second encounter with Koons' work. His work, like that of other appropriation artists, inherently raises difficult questions about the proper scope of copyright protection and the fair-use doctrine. I would continue to answer those questions as necessary to decide particular cases

=== Aftermath ===
After the Second Circuit affirmed Stanton's decision for Koons, the case returned to the Southern District. Koons moved for a million dollars in attorney's fees; Blanch filed a cross-motion seeking to have Koons's attorneys sanctioned under Federal Rule of Civil Procedure 11(b) for a frivolous argument. In May 2007, Stanton denied both, devoting most of his argument to Koons's motion:

Appropriation artists take other artists' work and use it in their own art, appropriating it and incorporating it in their own product with or without changes. Because of this appropriation, often (as in this case) done without giving credit to the original artist, the appropriation artists can expect that their work may attract lawsuits. They must accept the risks of defense, including the time, effort, and expenses involved. While that does not remove the appropriation artist from the protection of the statute, litigation is a risk he knowingly incurs when he copies the other's work.

Given his earlier experience with Rogers, Koons in particular could not claim ignorance of this risk. Stanton also found it significant for this motion that Blanch had not claimed any monetary damages, seeming to him instead to seek "to punish an artist who seemed to have embarked on a series of appropriations of others' work without credit or payment."

Stanton found that the case did not meet any of the factors the Supreme Court had outlined in Fogerty v. Fantasy for awards to defendants prevailing in copyright cases: Blanch's suit was not itself frivolous, her motivation was reasonable, the law seemed to be on Koons's side, and it did not look like it was necessary to discourage similar suits. "On the whole, this is not a case calling for an exercise of discretion in favor of granting attorneys' fees." Likewise, Blanch had a weak case that the Second Circuit did not find any more compelling than he had, so there was no reason to sanction Koons's attorneys for making the request.

In 2011, Blanch was asked her opinion of Koons as an artist. "I have to say that since the whole case happened, I've spent more time looking at his work; and I've gained an appreciation for it", she said. "It's conceptual — so either you like the concept or not. Some of the things I like, and others are kind of silly." Blanch was adamant that he still should have asked her for permission.

== Subsequent jurisprudence ==
In 2008, Judge Sidney Stein of the Southern District found the filmmakers behind Expelled: No Intelligence Allowed had made similarly transformative use of 15 seconds of John Lennon's "Imagine" in their film, which alleges an academic conspiracy against intelligent design and creationism. In the film, Lennon's voice was heard singing "Imagine no possessions ... and no religion too" over images of marching Soviet soldiers and Joseph Stalin. Yoko Ono and Lennon's sons, his heirs, and former record label argued that the song was simply "cut and pasted" into the film, but Stein found their use more like Koons's use of Blanch's photo:

As in Blanch, defendants here use a portion of "Imagine" as "fodder" for social commentary, altering it to further their distinct purpose. Just as Koons placed a portion of Blanch's photograph against a new background, defendants here play the excerpt of the song over carefully selected archival footage that implicitly comments on the song's lyrics. They also pair the excerpt of the song with the views of contemporary defenders of the theory of evolution and juxtapose it with an interview regarding the importance of transcendental values in public life ... To be transformative, it is not necessary that defendants alter the music or lyrics of the song. Indeed, defendants assert that the recognizability of "Imagine" is important to their use of it. Defendants' use is nonetheless transformative because they put the song to a different purpose, selected an excerpt containing the ideas they wished to critique, paired the music and lyrics with images that contrast with the song's Utopian expression, and placed the excerpt in the context of a debate regarding the role of religion in public life.

Stein also relied on Blanch and Bill Graham Archives to reject the Lennons' argument that the defendants did not need to use "Imagine", as neither case had considered necessity as part of fair use, and further that Blanch obviated any need for the defendants to have made an effort to seek permission.

In 2015's North Jersey Media Group, Inc. v. Pirro, the publisher of the Bergen Record sued Fox News commentator Jeanine Pirro for the unlicensed reuse of the newspaper's iconic photograph of New York City firefighters raising the American flag over the ruins of the World Trade Center after the September 11 attacks in the banner on the Facebook page for Pirro's show. She argued that combining it with the similar Raising the Flag on Iwo Jima and adding the hashtag "#NeverForget" to the images constituted transformative use sufficient to sustain a fair use defense. Southern Circuit Judge Edgardo Ramos rejected the comparison to Koons's alterations in Blanch, noting that unlike that situation any alterations to the Record's image were minimal, so minimal that they were only noticeable when pointed out, when denying Pirro summary judgement.

Almost a decade after Lennon, Stein again referred to Blanch to distinguish another reuse. Photographer Donald Graham sued another appropriation artist, Richard Prince, over his unlicensed reuse of one of Graham's photographs in a setting designed to look like an Instagram post in Prince's 2013 New Portraits exhibit at the Gagosian Gallery in Manhattan. Prince had argued that simply recontextualizing the photo as he had was enough for it to be transformative as a matter of law and thus fair use, per Blanch. But Stein noted that unlike Prince Koons had made considerable alterations to Blanch's image, so it would have to be left to a trier of fact to decide.

In 2021, Judge Kiyo Matsumoto of the Eastern District of New York looked to Blanch to better define satire after Boston Celtics point guard Terry Rozier was sued by the maker of the Ghostface mask used by villains in the Scream horror movies. Rozier, capitalizing on his "Scary Terry" nickname, had marketed a line of sweatshirts with a cartoon version of himself wearing the Ghostface mask. He argued as part of his fair use defense that the cartoon was both parody and satire.

Stein had accepted the parody argument, relying on Campbell. When he turned to satire, he recalled how Blanch had found Niagara to be better appreciated as satire since "it appears to target the genre of which [the original photograph] is typical, rather than the individual photograph itself". Stein applied a test derived from that case ... for a satirical purpose, could the defendant show a "genuine creative reason" for reusing the image, or did it instead seem as if they were simply lazy or disinclined to create a work of their own? He held that under that inquiry Rozier prevailed, as he had indicated an intent to poke fun at not only his nickname but the general practice of referring to effective point guards as "killers". The Ghostface mask was also part of Rozier's personal story, as the Scream films served as a distraction from a childhood marked by violence.

== Analysis and commentary ==
The year after the decision, Jeannine Marques at the Berkeley Technology Law Journal wrote that "Bill Graham and Blanch seem to mark a shift in focus in fair use jurisprudence towards promoting and encouraging transformative works, regardless of economic effects, in areas in which classical fair use was all but closed to secondary users" by which she meant cases like Castle Rock Entertainment, Inc. v. Carol Publishing Group Inc. a decade earlier, which had found a book of multiple-choice trivia quizzes about the Seinfeld TV series insufficiently transformative to be fair use. Another early transformative use case, Ringgold v. Black Entertainment Television, Inc., where the use of a poster of one of the plaintiff artist's works in the background of a few scenes from another television series was found to infringe the copyright, had some similar aspects to Blanch and might have been decided differently after it, Marques observed. Similarly, Blanch's expansive view of transformative use might also help documentary filmmakers keep scenes that inadvertently included, in the background, other copyrighted works, since like Blanch's photo they were a small portion of a larger work made up of many elements with an overall purpose different from any of those included, she speculated.

Other observers who had found Bill Graham Archives' expansion of transformative use an error believed that either the Second Circuit en banc or the Supreme Court would reverse, according to UCLA professor Neil Weinstock Netanel, until Blanch. While it was "not entirely all-fours on point with" the earlier decision, it reinforced the importance of transformative use in the fair use equation in general and the centrality of whether the defendant used the work for a different expressive purpose, he wrote in 2011.

=== Shift to emphasis on transformative use ===
"The case shows the remarkable extent to which the transformative use concept superseded the commercial/nonprofit dichotomy in determining which side the first factor favors", wrote copyright lawyer Kim Landsman in a 2015 Fordham Intellectual Property, Media & Entertainment Law Journal article. He called Stanton's first-factor finding in Koons's favor a "non sequitur" since the 900 words leading up to it finding both works to be commercial in nature to some extent did not explain how the first factor came to favor Koons. Sack's opinion for the Second Circuit had, Landsman allowed, been more balanced in addressing this even as it reiterated that the transformative-use inquiry was central to the case, leading it to the satire finding.

Landsman attributed the difference in outcomes for Koons between Rogers and Blanch to several factors, some of which had also been identified previously by others: greater cultural acceptance of appropriation art in general and Koons in particular in the years between the two cases, (Note: See Laura Heymann, Reasonable Appropriation and Reader Response, 9 U.C. Irvine L. Rev. 343, 348 (2019), citing Amy Adler, Fair Use and the Future of Art, 91 N.Y.U. L. Rev. 559, 581n102 (2016) and Rose, Mark (2016). Authors in Court: Scenes from the Theater of Copyright. Harvard University Press. p. 177. ISBN 9780674048041. Peter Jaszi similarly implies Koons's increased stature in the art world played a role.) the Bill Clinton-appointed Sack's focus on First Amendment issues in his Manhattan law practice prior to his judicial service (whereas Judge Richard J. Cardamone, author of Rogers, was a more personally conservative Ronald Reagan appointee from Utica), Campbell's shift in emphasis towards transformative use from the commercial-noncommercial question and a recent judicial trend in favor of fair use generally. Most significantly was the third factor: where Koons had copied the entire image in Rogers, in Blanch he had taken only a portion. That, Landsman suggested, was the issue that could have alone decided the case.

=== Reliance on artist's statement of intent ===
Netanel also found two other noteworthy aspects of Blanch. First, it had relied heavily on Koons's statements of intent regarding his work when assessing it under the first factor, statements that Blanch had not challenged. Second, those statements of intent guided the court in finding Koons's use for satirical purposes made for fair use, an argument that had hitherto been unsuccessful since the Supreme Court had, as the Second Circuit acknowledged, held in Campbell that satire had less leeway for copying than parody, before the court in that case. "Blanch seems largely to obliterate the distinction between parody and satire", Netanel wrote. He found this a striking contrast to Rogers, decided prior to Campbell, where the Second Circuit had categorically rejected Koons's satirical purpose as justifying fair use.

Koons's extensive affidavit regarding his intent was, Landsman believed, largely "ghost-[written]" by his lawyers, having seen how their client's inability to explain the same in Rogers had hurt him in that case. Landsman found Koons's use of "quoting and paraphrasing", terms most commonly associated with text, for his use of photography in Niagara "odd, because doing either in a written work would require citation." Likewise he saw in Koons's description of Blanch's photograph as "a fact in the world", an attempt to sway the court towards a second-factor finding favorable to fair use. In a 2019 article, William & Mary's Laura Heymann agrees: "Koons (or his lawyers) had figured out that the key to success was a cogent, artistically plausible story about what he intended to communicate through his work." She contrasts that with the later Cariou v. Prince, where the defendant, appropriation artist Richard Prince, lost at trial due to his disclaimer of any intent in reusing the plaintiff's photographs. On appeal, the Second Circuit reversed, holding intent was not necessary to prove transformative use.

==== Postmodernism ====
In 2008, Heymann advocated for the transformative use inquiry to focus on, or at least put on an equal footing, a reader, viewer or listener's perceptions of transformativeness rather than an abstract standard or the adapter's intent, following the concept of "discursive communities" in postmodernist literary theory, as promoted by critic and law professor Stanley Fish in his work, drawing on Roland Barthes's seminal essay, "The Death of the Author". Blanch, she noted, had followed this approach somewhat. In contrast to the Rogers court, "the Second Circuit devoted much more effort than it had in 1992 to describing the messages conveyed by each work, highlighting Koons's efforts to engage viewers in a different interpretive discourse from that of Blanch." While she agreed that the lawyers' presentation of the case may have made a difference, she maintained her larger point: "Courts, too, become members of discursive communities each time they take on a copyright case, even though they may not always realize it."

American University's Peter Jazsi sees Blanch's broadening of transformative use, in contrast to Rogers, as:

... reflect[ing] similar shifts in the cultural positioning of copyright ... [This may be t]he most interesting explanation of the Second Circuit’s revised take on Jeff Koons: that the rhetorical structure of the Blanch opinion represents a significant move away from the Modernist author-worship, and an early signal of a perceptible shift in how courts will increasingly understand the relationship between author and work in years to come. It represents, in fact, a rejection of the grand narrative of authorship and "author-ity," in favor of an approach that distributes attention and concern across the full range of participants in the processes of cultural production and consumption. As such, it may signal a general loosening of authors' and owners' authority over, by now, not quite so auratic works, allowing greater space for the free play of meaning on the part of audience members and follow-up users who bring new interpretations.

He describes this as a "postmodern" copyright: "[L]aw may be absorbing an attitude of skepticism about fixed identity and stable point of view—recognizing what has been clear for some time in arts practice and aesthetic theory: that much like the natural world, constructed culture is fair game for reinterpretation."

Building on Heymann's work, Elizabeth Winkowski sees context, as much as if not more than stated authorial intent, as the key lesson of Blanch, particularly in contrast to the downgrade the latter took in Cariou: "[I]f courts are to consider an author's stated meaning, they should do so in conjunction with context, adopting a mixed analysis similar to that used in Blanch, tak[ing] into consideration not only the author's own purported meaning, but also the meaning that might be reasonably perceived based on context", particularly when considering appropriation art, she wrote in a 2013 John Marshall Review of Intellectual Property Law comment. "If the purpose of copyright law is to promote creativity for the public’s benefit, courts should be willing to acknowledge new meanings, even where the author has not expressly articulated them".
