= Andy Warhol Foundation for the Visual Arts, Inc. v. Goldsmith =

- Supreme Court of the United States

Argued October 12, 2022 Decided May 18, 2023
- Full case name: Andy Warhol Foundation for the Visual Arts, Inc. v. Lynn Goldsmith, et al.
- Docket no.: 21-869
- Citations: 598 U.S. 508 (more)
- Argument: Oral argument
- Opinion announcement: Opinion announcement
- Decision: Opinion

Case history
- Prior: Summary judgement for petitioner, 382 F.Supp.3d 312 (S.D.N.Y., 2019); rev'd, 992 F.3d 99 (2nd Cir., 2021); am'd 11 F.4th 26 (2nd Cir., 2021) cert granted, 596 U.S. ___, (2022)

Holding
- Minor alterations to a copyrighted work are not transformative under fair use where altered work was used commercially for substantially similar purpose as original; courts must analyze the specific use of an allegedly infringing work before determining whether that use was transformative.

Court membership
- Chief Justice John Roberts Associate Justices Clarence Thomas · Samuel Alito; Sonia Sotomayor · Elena Kagan; Neil Gorsuch · Brett Kavanaugh; Amy Coney Barrett · Ketanji Brown Jackson

Case opinions
- Majority: Sotomayor, joined by Thomas, Alito, Gorsuch, Kavanaugh, Barrett, Jackson
- Concurrence: Gorsuch, joined by Jackson
- Dissent: Kagan, joined by Roberts

Andy Warhol Foundation for the Visual Arts, Inc. v. Goldsmith, 598 U.S. 508 (2023), is a U.S. Supreme Court case dealing with transformative use, a component of fair use, under U.S. copyright law. At issue was the Prince Series created by Andy Warhol based on a photograph of the musician Prince by Lynn Goldsmith. It held Warhol's changes were insufficiently transformative to fall within fair use for commercial purposes, resolving an issue arising from a split between the Second and Ninth circuits among others.

Goldsmith had taken her photograph in 1981 on assignment for Newsweek and retained copyright on it afterwards; it was not published. Three years later, Vanity Fair licensed the image for Andy Warhol to use as a reference for a silkscreen illustration of Prince to be published, by agreement with Goldsmith, only once, with her credited. But Warhol used the image as the basis for his Prince Series without asking or notifying Goldsmith; she only learned of the images' existence when Vanity Fair's publisher, Condé Nast, used one as the cover image, with no attribution, for a special tribute magazine to Prince after his death in 2016, which was licensed by the Andy Warhol Foundation (AWF). Litigation ensued in federal court between Goldsmith and the Warhol Foundation, which has administered the artist's works since his death, over whether Warhol's reuse of the image had infringed her copyright. The Southern District of New York sided with the foundation in 2019, but was reversed by the Second Circuit two years later.

The Second Circuit's reversal relied in part on a "clarification" of its 2013 holding in the very similar case of Cariou v. Prince (the photographer Patrick Cariou versus the painter Richard Prince), to the effect that a secondary work was not necessarily transformative of the original just because it was aesthetically different; it must also serve a distinguishably different artistic purpose, which Warhol's work, when used on a magazine cover to depict Prince, did not. Legal commentators, including Nimmer on Copyright and another appellate circuit, had criticized Cariou in particular and the Second Circuit in general as giving too great a weight to transformative use in determining fair use.

In May 2023, the Court ruled 7–2 that AWF's use of Goldsmith's photographs was not protected by fair use. Justice Sonia Sotomayor wrote for the majority that the works shared a similar purpose in the depiction of Prince in magazine articles, emphasizing the commercial nature of the product. Her opinion contained many footnotes disparaging Justice Elena Kagan's combative dissent, which was equally harsh on the majority as she defended the value of transformation in art. Commentators in the art world feared for the future of appropriation art, popular with artists inspired by Warhol like Richard Prince and Jeff Koons, if artists were to be deterred from creating works by fears of litigation or prohibitive license fees.

== Background ==
=== Fair use ===
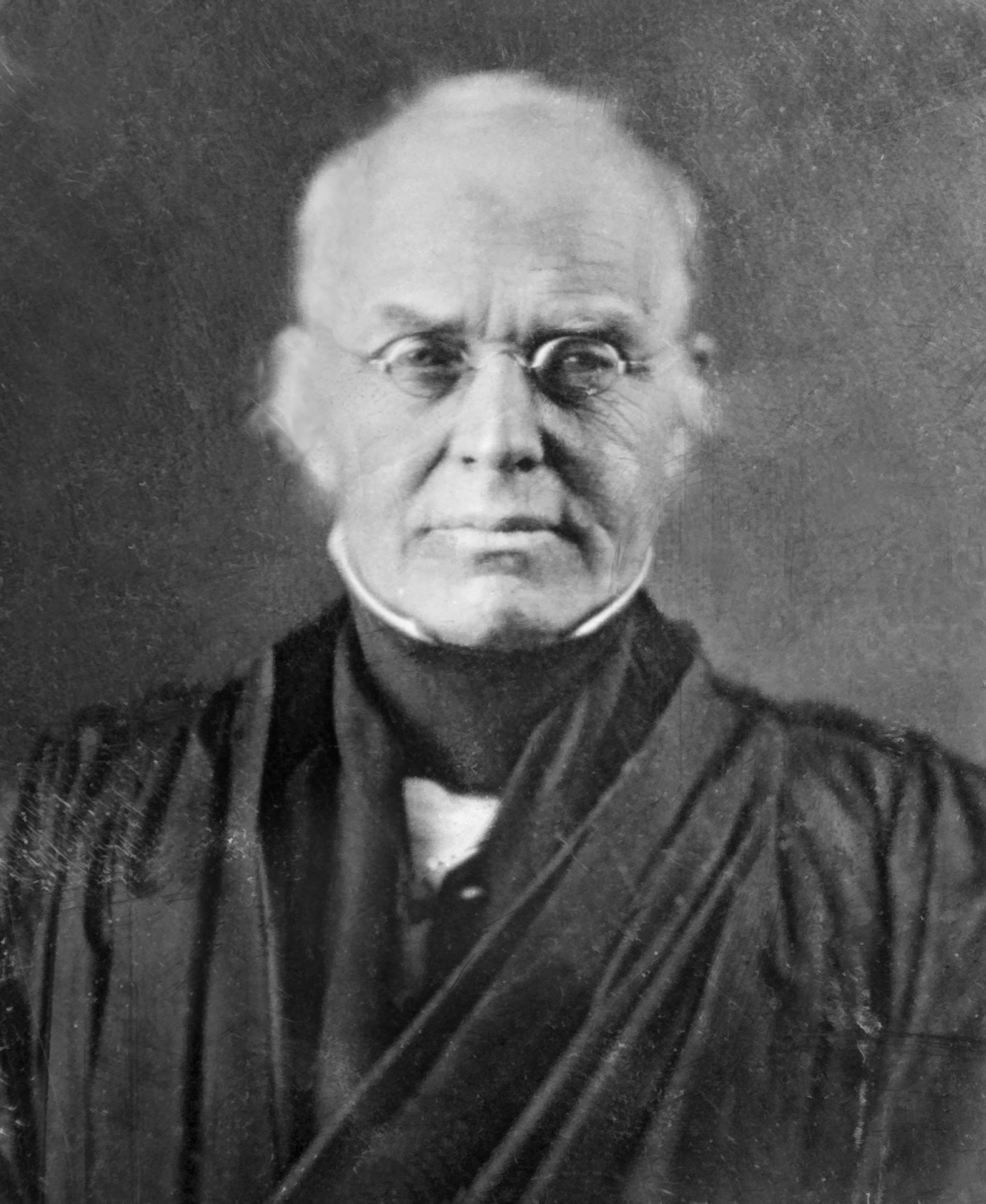
Justice Joseph Story, 1844

Fair use, the unlicensed use of material copyrighted by others in secondary works, was long accepted under English common law, but not well defined. Within U.S. copyright law, federal judge Joseph Story, later a Supreme Court justice, identified three aspects of fair use to be judged by a court in an 1841 case, Folsom v. Marsh, holding that the republication of some of George Washington's letters by a second writer was infringing:

- the "nature and objects of the selections made",
- the "quantity and value of the materials used", and
- the degree in which the use may prejudice the sale, or diminish the profits, or supersede the objects, of the original work"

After over a century of remaining in case law, Congress codified fair use in the Copyright Act of 1976. Story's three factors became four, with the second split into the nature of the original work, and the amount of it reused. In 1985 the Supreme Court gave courts guidance on how to apply them in Harper & Row v. Nation Enterprises, a case stemming from the unauthorized publication of the leaked memoirs of former president Gerald R. Ford. The Court held that fair use did not apply to this use of copyrighted material, maintaining that the public's right to know about matters of considerable historical import, such as Ford's decision to pardon his predecessor, was in this case insufficient to supersede the copyright. (Note: The Court had heard another fair use case the year before, Sony Corp. of America v. Universal City Studios, Inc., but that case dealt with whether recording broadcast television programs on video for personal use was fair use, not the allegedly infringing reuse of a specific work, relying almost exclusively on the fourth factor to hold that watching programs later than they had aired did not adversely affect commercial opportunities for the copyrighted work.)

=== Transformative use ===
Courts remained uncertain enough that five years later, another federal judge, Pierre Leval, then sitting on the Southern District of New York (SDNY), which hears many copyright cases, wrote a Harvard Law Review article, "Toward a Fair Use Standard", outlining more specific ideas. He reviewed cases considering fair use to date, Harper & Row included but also cases the Southern District and the Second Circuit Court of Appeals, which has appellate jurisdiction over it, had considered. In considering the first factor, the purpose of the secondary work, Leval said courts should strongly consider whether it was "transformative" of the original:

[It] must be productive and must employ the quoted matter in a different manner or for a different purpose than the original. A quotation of copyrighted material that either repackages or republishes the original is unlikely to pass the test ... If, on the other hand, the secondary use adds value to the original—if the quoted matter is used as raw material, transformed in the creation of new information, new aesthetics, new insights and understanding—this is the very type of activity that fair use doctrine intends to protect for the enrichment of society.

He cautioned that such use would not suffice to establish fair use by itself; it could easily be offset by other factors that might weigh in the copyright owner's favor.

Four years later the Supreme Court accepted the concept, citing Leval in Campbell v. Acuff-Rose Music, Inc., a case that settled a longstanding question over whether parody constituted fair use. In holding that rap group 2 Live Crew's parody of Roy Orbison's "Oh, Pretty Woman", which the publisher had refused to license to them, was not an infringement, the Court held transformative use to be something judges could consider in assessing the first factor. "Although such transformative use is not absolutely necessary for a finding of fair use," wrote Justice David Souter for a unanimous Court, "the goal of copyright, to promote science and the arts, is generally furthered by the creation of transformative works. Such works thus lie at the heart of the fair use doctrine's guarantee of breathing space within the confines of copyright."

=== Appropriation art and copyright ===
In the latter decades of the 20th century, pop artists like Andy Warhol and Robert Rauschenberg reacted to consumer culture and the increasing amount of mass-produced imagery in the media, particularly advertising, by using those images in their own art, sometimes as their own, a practice termed "appropriation art". In two instances this led to lawsuits. Warhol settled a 1966 claim brought by the photographer whose image he had used as the basis of his Flowers Series. Fourteen years later Rauschenberg similarly settled with a photographer whose work he had used; (Note: Prior to 1978 copyright suits were often difficult for plaintiffs as they had to both prove they had published the work before the alleged infringement and registered with the Copyright Office in a timely fashion. The photographer settled because he was unsure of success on those grounds and because he could not spend as much on legal representation as Rauschenberg.) until then he had argued fair use with arguments similar to those now accepted as transformative use.

Jeff Koons and Richard Prince became prominent in the art scene during the 1980s, both relying on repurposing the work of others, likewise drawing suit. A sculpture recreating a postcard that Koons had found and torn the copyright notice off was held not to be fair use by the Second Circuit Court of Appeals in Rogers v. Koons, since it was so similar to the original as to make it "difficult to discern" the parody Koons claimed his work was. He lost at trial the next year over his unauthorized use of Odie from the Garfield comic strip. Neither case considered transformative use; they were decided after Leval's paper but before Campbell.

But 12 years later, with transformative use more clearly established, Koons prevailed when fashion photographer Andrea Blanch alleged his use of part of a photograph she had taken infringed her copyright. Since he had used merely the woman's lower legs and shoes from Blanch's work, changed their angle and put them on a different background with three other sets of women's lower legs from other images as part of a collage, the Second Circuit held that Koons had more than sufficiently transformed Blanch's image to claim fair use. The Supreme Court's test in Campbell, it said, "almost perfectly describes" what Koons had done.

==== Cariou v. Prince ====
Photographer Patrick Cariou sued Richard Prince in 2008 over the latter's Canal Zone exhibit, which repurposed 30 images from Cariou's 2000 book Yes, Rasta into 28 paintings, some minimally altered from their originals while others were used in collages. The case attracted considerable attention in the art world since the Southern District held in Cariou's favor and issued an injunction calling for the most severe remedy available under copyright law: the confiscation and/or destruction of any of Prince's unsold copies of his work, and the exhibition catalogs. It was feared the verdict would have a chilling effect on appropriation art. Trial judge Deborah Batts ruled that Prince had not sufficiently transformed most of Cariou's photos, since in his testimony he had eschewed any intended comment on them. She also found Prince and the Gagosian Gallery, which exhibited Canal Zone, acted in bad faith since it had sold Prince's work without investigating the permission status of the original work despite being aware he regularly used others' work and Cariou's contact information and copyright notice being readily available in his book.

On appeal, the Second Circuit reversed. The panel held that Batts had erred by requiring that transformative use be seen as commenting on the original work, or something greater; it was enough that his alterations had changed the mood of the images. Judge Barrington D. Parker Jr. wrote for the panel:

What is critical is how the work in question appears to the reasonable observer, not simply what an artist might say about a particular piece or body of work. Prince's work could be transformative even without commenting on Cariou's work or on culture, and even without Prince's stated intention to do so. Rather than confining our inquiry to Prince's explanations of his artworks, we instead examine how the artworks may "reasonably be perceived" in order to assess their transformative nature.

The court held 25 of the 30 images transformative and remanded the other five to the district court to assess them under its standard, vacating the injunction until that decision could be made, a decision hailed by the arts community. In 2014 Cariou and Prince settled the case before that could happen.

Cariou was criticized for expanding the role of transformative use to the point that it alone might become dispositive of the entire fair use inquiry. The following year, in Kienitz v. Sconnie Nation, while affirming a finding of transformative use of a photograph of a local official used on a T-shirt making fun of him, Judge Frank Easterbrook of the Seventh Circuit wrote:

We're skeptical of Cariou's approach, because asking exclusively whether something is "transformative" not only replaces the list in § 107 but also could override 17 U.S.C. § 106(2), which protects derivative works. To say that a new use transforms the work is precisely to say that it is derivative and thus, one might suppose, protected under § 106(2). Cariou and its predecessors in the Second Circuit do not explain how every "transformative use" can be "fair use" without extinguishing the author's rights under § 106(2) ... We think it best to stick with the statutory list

"[A] finding of transformativeness shifts the analysis of the other factors so as to render them insignificant" wrote copyright lawyer Kim Landsman two years after Cariou, drawing on earlier research showing that courts had increasingly minimized the question of commercial reuse in favor of transformativeness since 2005. "It would seem that the pendulum has swung too far in the direction of recognizing any alteration as transformative, such that this doctrine now threatens to swallow fair use", wrote Nimmer on Copyright, a widely cited guide to the law in that area, after the case, calling for a "correction", a comment the Second Circuit itself acknowledged in a 2016 case even as it called Cariou a "high-water mark" for transformative use in its case law.

== Underlying dispute ==
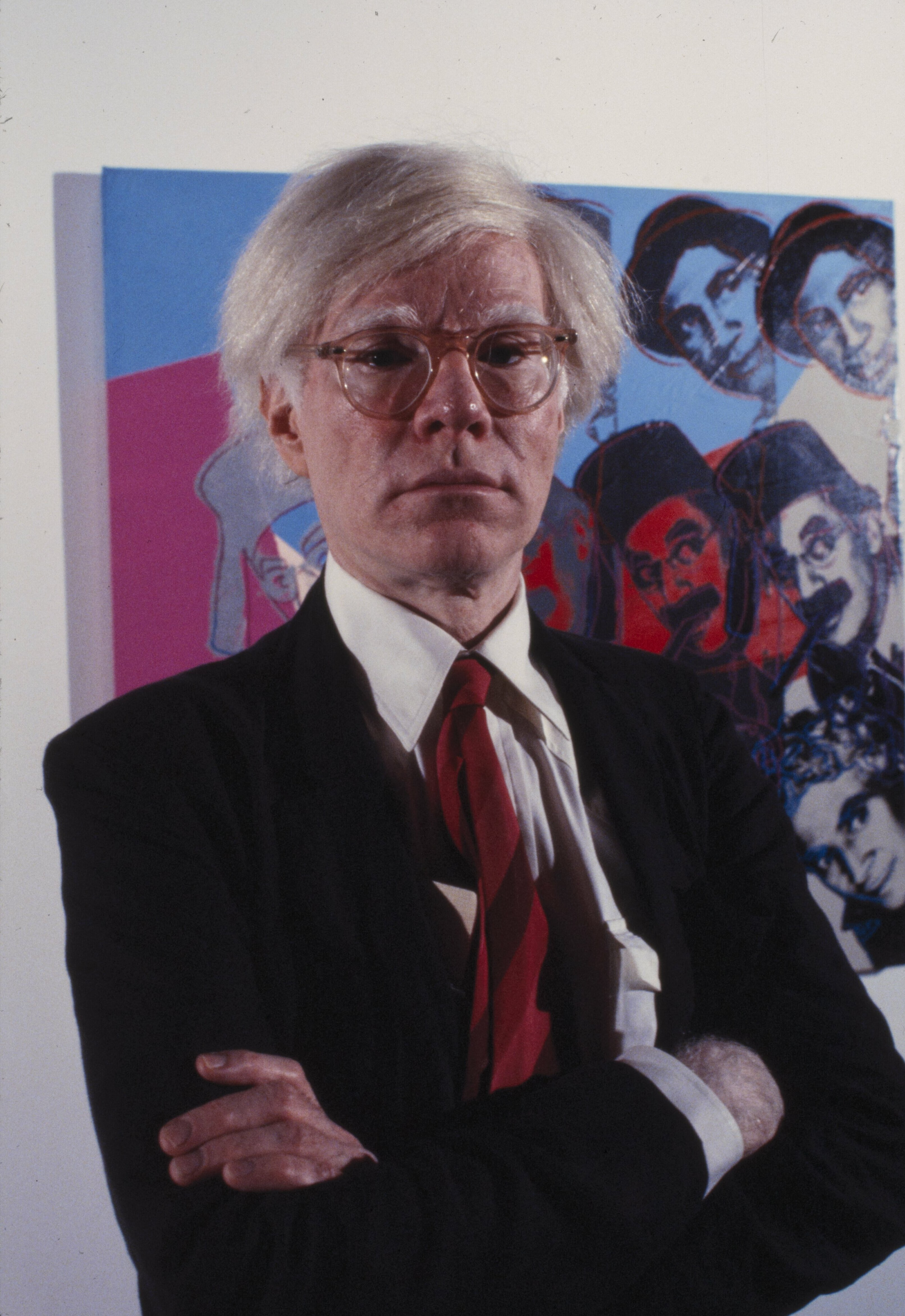
Andy Warhol in 1980

In 1981 photographer Lynn Goldsmith took a series of photographs of Prince at the start of his musical career. Following the release of Prince's Purple Rain in 1984, the magazine Vanity Fair, a Condé Nast publication, licensed one of those photos, a single black and white full length portrait photograph (previously unpublished), for a planned feature; It was agreed the photograph would be used as an "artistic reference" for an illustration that would be used only once. The magazine then commissioned pop-art artist Andy Warhol to create a highly colorized silkscreen using just Prince's head from the photograph, illustrating the feature, "Purple Fame". Goldsmith shared credit.

Warhol created 16 variants of the Prince portrait between 1984 and his death in 1987, collectively known as the Prince Series, including the notable 1984 Orange Prince variant. All of the 16 works remained in Warhol's private collection while he was alive and after his death were managed by the Andy Warhol Foundation for the Visual Arts (AWF). The Prince Series works have been exhibited many times in museum shows and galleries around the world including the Museum of Modern Art, Tate and The Andy Warhol Museum.

After Prince's death in 2016, Condé Nast published a commemorative magazine looking back on his life with one of the Prince Series variants as the cover image, crediting the Warhol Foundation but not mentioning Goldsmith. Despite having licensed the photograph and agreed to a co-credit in Vanity Fair many years prior, Goldsmith alleged that she had been unaware of the existence of the illustration and the Prince Series until she saw the Condé Nast cover.

The images before the courts

Goldsmith's 1981 photo of Prince, unpublished but used by Warhol as a reference

Warhol's Orange Prince, from his Prince Series, based on Goldsmith's photo

== Preliminary rulings ==
Goldsmith informed the Foundation that she believed these additional works were copyright violations of her photograph and stated her intent to seek legal action. The Foundation filed for a preliminary ruling in the Southern District of New York, stating in court papers that it felt like a "shakedown". Goldsmith filed a counterclaim seeking to have the Warhol image declared an infringement of her copyright.

=== District court ===
In 2019, Judge John G. Koeltl granted the Foundation's motion. He held that Warhol had sufficiently transformed Goldsmith's original photograph under fair use as to show the change of Prince "from a vulnerable, uncomfortable person to an iconic, larger-than-life figure". The Foundation had also argued that Goldsmith's claim was barred by the three-year statute of limitations under the Copyright Act of 1976, but he cited precedent in the Second and other circuits that the statute of limitations for an infringement claim starts when the copyright owner has actual or constructive knowledge of the infringement, not when the allegedly infringing work was created. He also noted that Goldsmith had claimed the infringement occurred with the 2016 licensing to Condé Nast, not Warhol's original creation of the work, (Note: Goldsmith had alleged this as an infringement theory, but Koeltl held this time-barred (Foundation I, at 324).) rendering her claim timely.

The core of Koeltl's opinion was the application of the four factors—commercial vs. non-commercial use, expressive vs. non-expressive nature, the portion of the original work used and whether the secondary work harms market opportunities for the original—a court considers in a copyright claim where fair use is asserted as a defense.

Koeltl observed that although the Prince Series works were primarily commercial, several had been donated to museums, and the Foundation used profits from licensing Warhol's works to support its programs, so its work could also be said to support the public interest in the visual arts as a whole, meaning the work was not purely commercial. "In any event," he continued, "the Prince Series works are transformative, and therefore the import of their (limited) commercial nature is diluted." Warhol had taken the "vulnerable human being" of Goldsmith's photograph and, by cropping it to the musician's head, strengthening the contrast and adding loud, unnatural colors,

... can reasonably be perceived to have transformed Prince from a vulnerable, uncomfortable person to an iconic, larger-than-life figure. The humanity Prince embodies in Goldsmith's photograph is gone. Moreover, each Prince Series work is immediately recognizable as a "Warhol" rather than as a photograph of Prince — in the same way that Warhol's famous representations of Marilyn Monroe and Mao are recognizable as "Warhols," not as realistic photographs of those persons.

Koeltl's analysis relied heavily on Cariou. (Note: Koeltl acknowledged in a footnote that Cariou has been criticized as "over-emphasizing transformative use" but said he was bound by it as circuit precedent.)

On the second factor, whether the original photograph had been expressive enough to create a higher bar for the Foundation to establish transformative use, Koeltl found for neither party. Goldsmith's argument that the photograph had never been published would, he allowed, ordinarily settle the matter in her favor. But in this instance she had licensed it to be used as Warhol's reference. His finding of transformative use also further mitigated the importance of this factor.

Goldsmith argued that the third factor, the portion of the original work used, still favored her despite Warhol's use of only Prince's face from her work since that was the "essence" of her image. Koeltl looked to Kienitz, where Easterbrook wrote that "[d]efendants removed so much of the original that, as with the Cheshire Cat, only the smile remains." (Note: Koeltl noted that the Seventh Circuit reached this result after criticizing Cariou.) Likewise, in the instant case, "Warhol removed nearly all the photograph's protectible elements in creating the Prince Series", Koeltl wrote, as she could not copyright Prince's face nor his pose.

"Goldsmith wisely does not contend that Warhol's work has usurped her market for direct sales of [her p]hotograph", Koeltl wrote, beginning to consider the final factor. "It is plain that the markets for a Warhol and for a Goldsmith fine-art or other type of print are different." Instead she had claimed that the Prince Series posed future harm should she decide to market that photograph or others like it. Koeltl did not find this argument persuasive:

Although Goldsmith points out that her photographs and Warhol's works have both appeared in magazines and on album covers, this does not suggest that a magazine or record company would license a transformative Warhol work in lieu of a realistic Goldsmith photograph. Moreover, Goldsmith does not specify the types of magazines and album covers on which she and Warhol appear, and whether they are similar. Put simply, the licensing market for Warhol prints is for "Warhols." This market is distinct from the licensing market for photographs like Goldsmith's—a market which Goldsmith has not even attempted to enter into with her Prince photographs.

Since three of the four factors favored the Foundation, Koeltl granted it summary judgement.

=== Appeals court ===
Goldsmith appealed to the Second Circuit. She said on a GoFundMe page she had set up for the case that she had spent $400,000 by then and sought to raise $2 million. "I hope to define what is transformative under the fair use aspect of the copyright law so that no one else has to endure what I've had to, so that heirs to work can benefit from what was left to them, and so that future creators who copyright their work will never have to battle for their rights against deep pocketed artists, businesses, or foundations", she wrote.

A panel consisting of circuit judges Gerard E. Lynch, Dennis Jacobs and Richard J. Sullivan reversed Koeltl's judgement in March 2021, allowing Goldsmith's lawsuit to proceed. It considered the same four factors but found that all of them favored Goldsmith's claim. (Note: The Second Circuit withdrew its original opinion (992 F.3d 99, 2021) and issued an amended version several months later)

After reviewing the facts of the case, Lynch's majority opinion turned to the applicable case law, in particular Cariou. "While we remain bound by Cariou, and have no occasion or desire to question its correctness on its own facts, our review of the decision below persuades us that some clarification is in order" wrote Lynch.

The Supreme Court had stressed in its cases on fair use that "is a context-sensitive inquiry that does not lend itself to simple bright-line rules." Nonetheless, Lynch said, Koeltl:

... read Cariou as having announced such a rule, to wit, that any secondary work is necessarily transformative as a matter of law ... Although a literal construction of certain passages of Cariou may support that proposition, such a reading stretches the decision too far ... Of course, the alteration of an original work "with 'new expression, meaning, or message,'" ... by placing the work "in a different context" ... or by any other means is the sine qua non of transformativeness. It does not follow, however, that any secondary work that adds a new aesthetic or new expression to its source material is necessarily transformative.

Lynch focused on five of the 30 photos at issue in Cariou that the court had remanded to the district court (Note: The case was settled before the court could consider the question), where Prince had painted over some aspects, including the subject's faces, as it could not find Prince had transformatively used them as examples of what did not automatically qualify as transformative fair use as a matter of law. And while the court considered film adaptations of novels to involve a great deal of transformation due to the many creative professionals involved and the wide range of choices possible, "[they] are identified as a paradigmatic example of derivative works", as the circuit had observed in Authors Guild, Inc. v. HathiTrust.

In considering the stated or assumed intent of the artist as a factor in determining transformative use, Lynch wrote, Koeltl erred: "The district judge should not assume the role of art critic and seek to ascertain the intent behind or meaning of the works at issue. That is so both because judges are typically unsuited to make aesthetic judgments and because such perceptions are inherently subjective." It was clear the Prince Series derived from Goldsmith's photograph, he said, and that the fair use defense for transformative works failed because Warhol's work "retains the essential elements of the Goldsmith photograph without significantly adding to or altering those elements." Lynch returned the area of film adaptations to make his point:

[Consider] the Ken Russell film, from a screenplay by Larry Kramer, derived from D.H. Lawrence's novel, Women in Love: the film is as recognizable a "Ken Russell" as the Prince Series are recognizably "Warhols." But the film, for all the ways in which it transforms (that is, in the ordinary meaning of the word, which indeed is used in the very definition of derivative works its source material), is also plainly an adaptation of the Lawrence novel.

Lynch acknowledged that Warhol had removed some aspects of Goldsmith's photograph. But, "although we do not conclude that the Prince Series works are necessarily derivative works as a matter of law, they are much closer to presenting the same work in a different form, that form being a high-contrast screenprint, than they are to being works that make a transformative use of the original." He observed that the Prince Series was less transformative than the five works remanded in Cariou since "those works unmistakably deviated from Cariou's original portraiture in a manner that suggested an entirely distinct artistic end".

Lastly, Lynch also dismissed Koeltl's holding that by being recognizably "Warhols", the Prince Series were transformative: "Entertaining that logic would inevitably create a celebrity-plagiarist privilege; the more established the artist and the more distinct that artist's style, the greater leeway that artist would have to pilfer the creative labors of others." He concluded this portion of the opinion by reiterating that this finding was entirely a legal one and that the court was not expressing an aesthetic judgement on Warhol's work.

On the issue of commercial use, Lynch agreed with Koeltl that the Foundation's purpose in licensing the series and other Warhol works was not purely commercial. But while that slightly complicated the analysis, he considered it more relevant at other stages of the litigation, such as fashioning equitable remedies. "Nevertheless, just as we cannot hold that the Prince Series is transformative as a matter of law, neither can we conclude that Warhol and AWF are entitled to monetize it without paying Goldsmith the 'customary price' for the rights to her work, even if that monetization is used for the benefit of the public."

Lynch also held that Koeltl had erred in his finding on the second factor, the nature of the work. Just because Goldsmith had licensed it to Condé Nast for an artist to use as a reference did not make it published as she retained the right to decide if and when to publish it, Lynch said. "Having recognized the Goldsmith Photograph as both creative and unpublished, the district court should have found this factor to favor Goldsmith irrespective of whether it adjudged the Prince Series works transformative within the meaning of the first factor."

Lynch had more to say about the third factor, the amount of the original work used. The Foundation had argued, again, that Warhol removed the distinctive elements of the photograph and thus made the Prince Series distinctly his work. "[This] misses the mark", Lynch said.

The premise of its argument is that Goldsmith cannot copyright Prince's face. True enough ... But while Goldsmith has no monopoly on Prince's face, the law grants her a broad monopoly on its image as it appears in her photographs of him, And where, as here, the secondary user has used the photograph itself, rather than, for example, a similar photograph, the photograph's specific depiction of its subject cannot be neatly reduced to discrete qualities such as contrast, shading, and depth of field that can be stripped away, taking the image's entitlement to copyright protection along with it.

The Prince Series images "are instantly recognizable as depictions or images of the Goldsmith Photograph itself", said Lynch. He noted that the Foundation had submitted as evidence other photos of Prince to support its contention, but to him they actually strengthened Goldsmith's case by demonstrating that the series would have looked very different had those other photos been used as the reference. "Indeed, Warhol's process had the effect of amplifying, rather than minimizing, certain aspects of the Goldsmith Photograph."

The Foundation had offered no evidence suggesting that Warhol was specifically interested in Goldsmith's photo as a reference, Lynch added. He also distinguished the case from Kienitz by noting that while the photo in that case had been drained of any resemblance to the original, "Warhol's rendition of the Goldsmith Photograph leaves quite a bit more detail, down to the glint in Prince's eyes where the umbrellas in Goldsmith's studio reflected off his pupils." That case was not binding precedent in the Second Circuit in any event.

In addressing the final factor, the effect on the market for the original work were the use to become widespread, Lynch again began by agreeing with Koeltl, that in this case the primary markets for Goldsmith's photograph and the Prince Series did not overlap. He disagreed with Koeltl's judgement that the Warhol image would not affect her licensing market for two reasons: the fact that she had not licensed the image did not mean she never would, since the court had to consider potential markets in addition to existing ones, and Koeltl had erred procedurally by putting the burden of proof for such harm on her rather than the Foundation.

"Most directly, AWF's licensing of the Prince Series works to Condé Nast without crediting or paying Goldsmith deprived her of royalty payments to which she would have otherwise been entitled", Lynch wrote, moving on to the market for derivative works, in which both parties participated. "Although we do not always consider lost royalties from the challenged use itself under the fourth factor (as any fair use necessarily involves the secondary user using the primary work without paying for the right to do so), we do consider them where the secondary use occurs within a traditional or reasonable market for the primary work."

The analysis also had to take into account what public benefit might result from the copying. The Foundation feared a chilling effect on art that involved similar copying, but Lynch dismissed those concerns: "Nothing in this opinion stifles the creation of art that may reasonably be perceived as conveying a new meaning or message, and embodying a new purpose, separate from its source material." He noted that Goldsmith had foregone some of the more extreme measures she could have sought as the holder of the infringed copyright, and that it was the Foundation's licensing of the Prince Series, not the actual work, she alleged to have been infringing. "Thus, art that is not turned into a commercial replica of its source material, and that otherwise occupies a separate primary market, has significantly more 'breathing space' than the commercial licensing of the Prince Series."

Finding all four factors favored Goldsmith, and noting that the Foundation had offered no "additional relevant considerations unique to this case that we should take into account", Lynch held for her that the Foundation was not entitled to fair use.

=== Amended decision after rehearing ===
Shortly after the decision was handed down, the Supreme Court decided Google v. Oracle, its first decision on fair use in years. The Foundation petitioned for rehearing, and the panel granted it to consider its effect on the case, (Note: It was a rehearing in name only as the court felt fresh oral argument on the issue was unnecessary.) which the Foundation argued called for a different result. But in an amended version of the ruling issued several months later that took Google into account, Lynch was unpersuaded. The Foundation, he said, "misinterpret[s] both opinions as adopting hard and fast categorical rules of fair use. To the contrary, both opinions recognize that determinations of fair use are highly contextual and fact specific, and are not easily reduced to rigid rules." The Court had also noted that since Google involved computer code, a primarily functional form of writing, its holding might not be so readily applicable to other areas of copyright law where artistic expression was at issue.

Lynch also dismissed the Foundation's claim that the earlier decision effectively outlawed an entire genre of art, likening the case to Google's dispute between two software makers.

We merely insist that, just as artists must pay for their paint, canvas, neon tubes, marble, film, or digital cameras, if they choose to incorporate the existing copyrighted expression of other artists in ways that draw their purpose and character from that work (as by using a copyrighted portrait of a person to create another portrait of the same person, recognizably derived from the copyrighted portrait, so that someone seeking a portrait of that person might interchangeably use either one), they must pay for that material as well. As the Supreme Court again recognized in Google, the aims of copyright law are "sometimes conflicting." The issue here does not pit novel forms of art against philistine censorship, but rather involves a conflict between artists each seeking to profit from his or her own creative efforts.

=== Substantial similarity argument ===
Lastly, Lynch considered the Foundation's alternative argument that the district decision be affirmed on the grounds that the two works were not substantially similar. Normally in copyright lawsuits that question, when raised, was left to a jury, Lynch observed, but did not have to be in this case since opportunity to copy was not a hypothetical but instead a stipulated central fact of the case. And while it was often remanded to the trial court for consideration, it did not have to be, and in this case since fair use had already been asserted it did not have to be.

Lynch rejected the Foundation's argument for applying the "more discerning observer" test since that was reserved for media, mostly home decor, that typically contained a mix of copyrightable and non-copyrightable elements, which was not the issue with the photographs before the court. So he went with the "ordinary observer" test, distinguishing the Prince Series from precedents the Foundation cited by noting that those cases, resolved in the alleged infringer's favor, had involved images that replicated the original work, or had attempted to, rather than being directly derived from it as Warhol's had been. "This is not to say that every use of an exact reproduction constitutes a work that is substantially similar to the original", Lynch concluded. "But here, given the degree to which Goldsmith's work remains recognizable within Warhol's, there can be no reasonable debate that the works are substantially similar ... Prince, like other celebrity artists, was much photographed. But any reasonable viewer with access to a range of such photographs including the Goldsmith Photograph would have no difficulty identifying the latter as the source material for Warhol's Prince Series."

=== Jacobs concurrence ===
Judge Dennis Jacobs added a short concurrence "to make a single point": that the court's decision was limited to the Foundation's 2016 licensing and, although it had asked for a declaratory judgement that the Prince Series itself was non-infringing, Goldsmith had not challenged that so the courts could not rule. (Note: He allowed that if that had been the question, the case might have been decided differently.) He reassured the owners of other works in the series, and indeed other works by Warhol and other modern artists that might similarly be challenged as derivative works that this decision did not affect them.

== Supreme Court ==
The Foundation petitioned the Supreme Court to challenge the Second Circuit's ruling, which it called "a sea-change in the law of copyright" that would cast "a cloud of legal uncertainty over an entire genre of visual art."

=== Before the Court ===
AWF claimed that decision subverted the entire purpose of copyright law: to promote creative progress. It said the opinion's insistence that its "conclusion that those images are closer to what the law deems 'derivative' (and not 'transformative') does not imply that the Prince Series (or Warhol’s art more broadly) is 'derivative', in the pejorative artistic sense, of Goldsmith's work or of anyone else's" was disingenuous and could create a chilling effect. Under the Second Circuit's logic, as claimed by the Foundation, an artist like Warhol would be chilled from creating a similar work today in fear of facing claims of infringement, which, under the Circuit's standard, would be upheld.

The Foundation sought to address the circuit split on the matter of transformative works under fair use provisions created by the Second Circuit, particularly with the Ninth Circuit where most fair use defense cases have been heard and which supported the district court's treatment of transformative works. The Foundation also identified the Supreme Court's decision in Google LLC v. Oracle America, Inc. (2021) related to transformative use as supporting the district court's position.

Goldsmith argued that the Second Circuit's decision was not as dire for copyright as the Foundation claimed, saying it took "a Chicken-Little approach to the decision below, but the sky is not remotely close to falling."

The Supreme Court granted certiorari for the case in March 2022, to be heard during the following term, deciding whether the Foundation's licensing of Orange Prince to Condé Nast infringed Goldsmith's copyright. The U.S. Copyright Office sided with Goldsmith in its amicus curiae brief, saying Warhol's works were not fair use, as they did not create new expressive meaning, and that a ruling in favor of Warhol would "dramatically expand copyists' ability to appropriate existing works".

=== Decision ===
The Court issued its ruling on May 18, 2023, considering only the question of whether the use Condé Nast made of the image licensed from the Foundation could be characterized as transformative in the commercial context, and letting all the Second Circuit's conclusions as to the other factors stand. Justice Sonia Sotomayor wrote for the majority, joined by all six of the other justices holding for Goldsmith. Justice Neil Gorsuch wrote a concurring opinion joined by Justice Ketanji Brown Jackson. Justice Elena Kagan's dissent was joined by Chief Justice John Roberts.

Beyond its holding, the case drew comment for the unusually confrontational tone Sotomayor and Kagan's opinions took with each other. (Note: Matt Ford, who covers the Supreme Court for The New Republic, noted that as acrimonious as the two opinions were they were still "the Congress of Vienna" compared to Gorsuch's dissent in Oklahoma v. Castro-Huerta the previous term.) In one of her many footnotes directly criticizing the dissent, Sotomayor characterized it as "a series of misstatements and exaggerations, from [it]s very first sentence to its very last." Kagan took note of the majority's unusual focus on the dissent in a footnote of her own, questioning the need for "pages of commentary and fistfuls of comeback footnotes" if the majority found the dissent as irrational and baseless as it claimed to, and suggesting that its opinion might thus be "self-refuting".

==== Majority ====
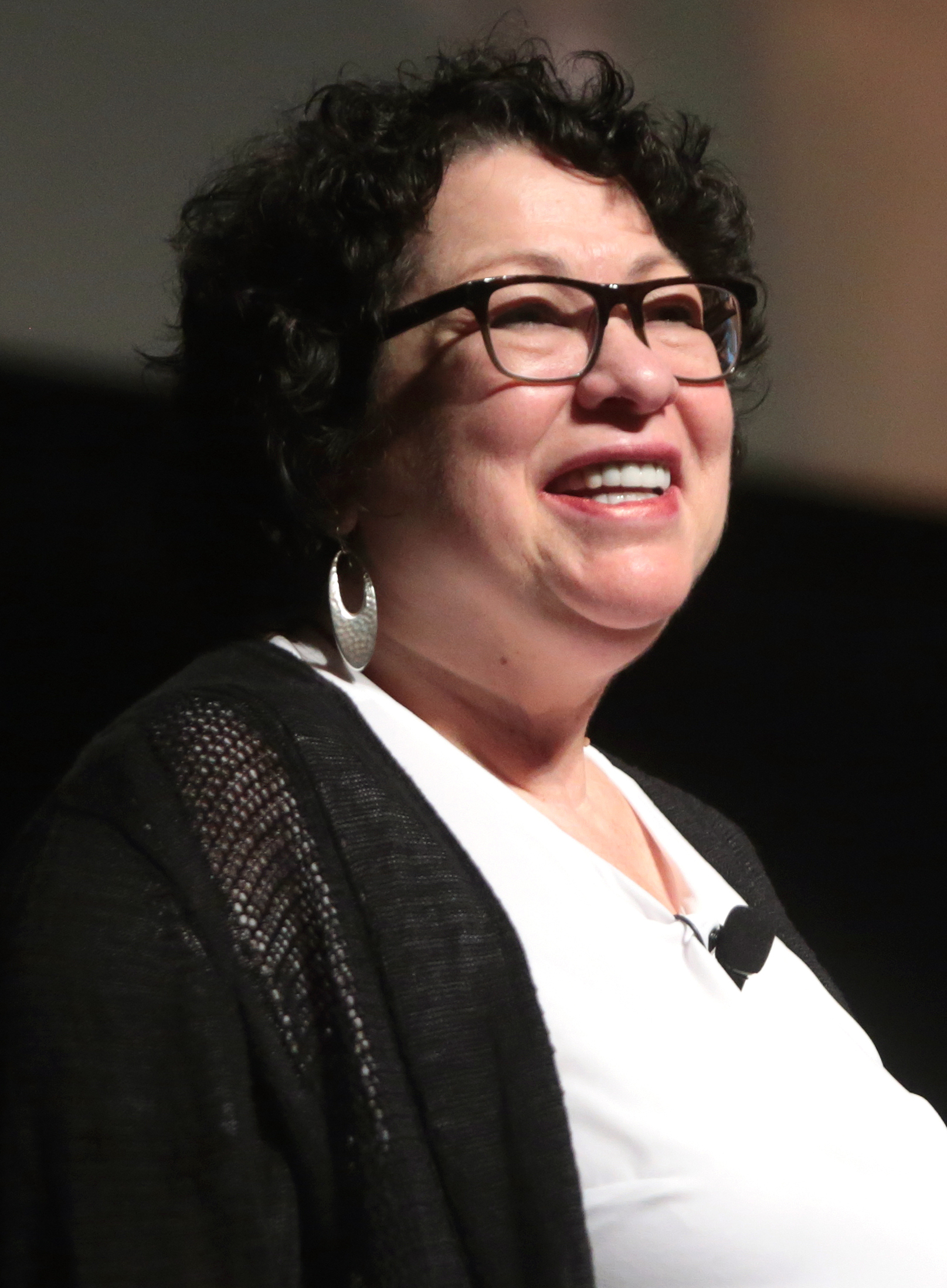
Justice Sonia Sotomayor in 2017

Sotomayor's ruling, profusely illustrated not just with the images at issue but also other pictures of Prince by Goldsmith and others, as well as some of Warhol's work, largely reiterated the facts of the case and the underlying case law. She quoted Lynch's opinion frequently. At one point she put a smaller version of Warhol's image on Goldsmith's, rotated so it matched the angle on the original image, immediately adjacent, to demonstrate the essential similarity of the two.

Justice Sotomayor concluded that the "purpose and character of the use" weighed against the Foundation. Analyzing market substitution as inversely related to transformativeness, she found that similarity of use—both the Foundation and Goldsmith competed to license images to magazines—cut against a finding of fair use. Addressing the role of new meaning, she observed, "What role meaning or message played in the Second Circuit's analysis here is not entirely clear." She agreed, nonetheless, with its conclusions that aesthetic or expressive changes do not by themselves make a work transformative and that meaning or message can be considered in judging a work's purpose but are similarly not dispositive by themselves in that inquiry. Lynch's warning that judges should not be art critics in this department was partially right, Sotomayor wrote, in that a court should not evaluate the artistic significance of a work. "But the meaning of a secondary work, as reasonably can be perceived, should be considered to the extent necessary to determine whether the purpose of the use is distinct from the original, for instance, because the use comments on, criticizes, or provides otherwise unavailable information about the original."

In conclusion, Sotomayor wrote:

The use of a copyrighted work may nevertheless be fair if, among other things, the use has a purpose and character that is sufficiently distinct from the original. In this case, however, Goldsmith's original photograph of Prince, and AWF's copying use of that photograph in an image licensed to a special edition magazine devoted to Prince, share substantially the same purpose, and the use is of a commercial nature. AWF has offered no other persuasive justification for its unauthorized use of the photograph.

==== Concurrence ====
"[T]he Court's decision seems to me to be exactly right", Gorsuch wrote. He reiterated Sotomayor's reminder that the only issue before the justices was the Foundation's licensing of the image to illustrate a magazine cover. "[U]nder the first fair-use factor the salient point is that the purpose and character of the Foundation's use involved competition with Ms. Goldsmith's image. To know that much is to know the first fair-use factor favors Ms. Goldsmith". He offered that if the AWF displayed the Prince series "in a nonprofit museum or a for-profit book commenting on 20th-century art, the purpose and character of that use might well point to fair use."

==== Dissent ====
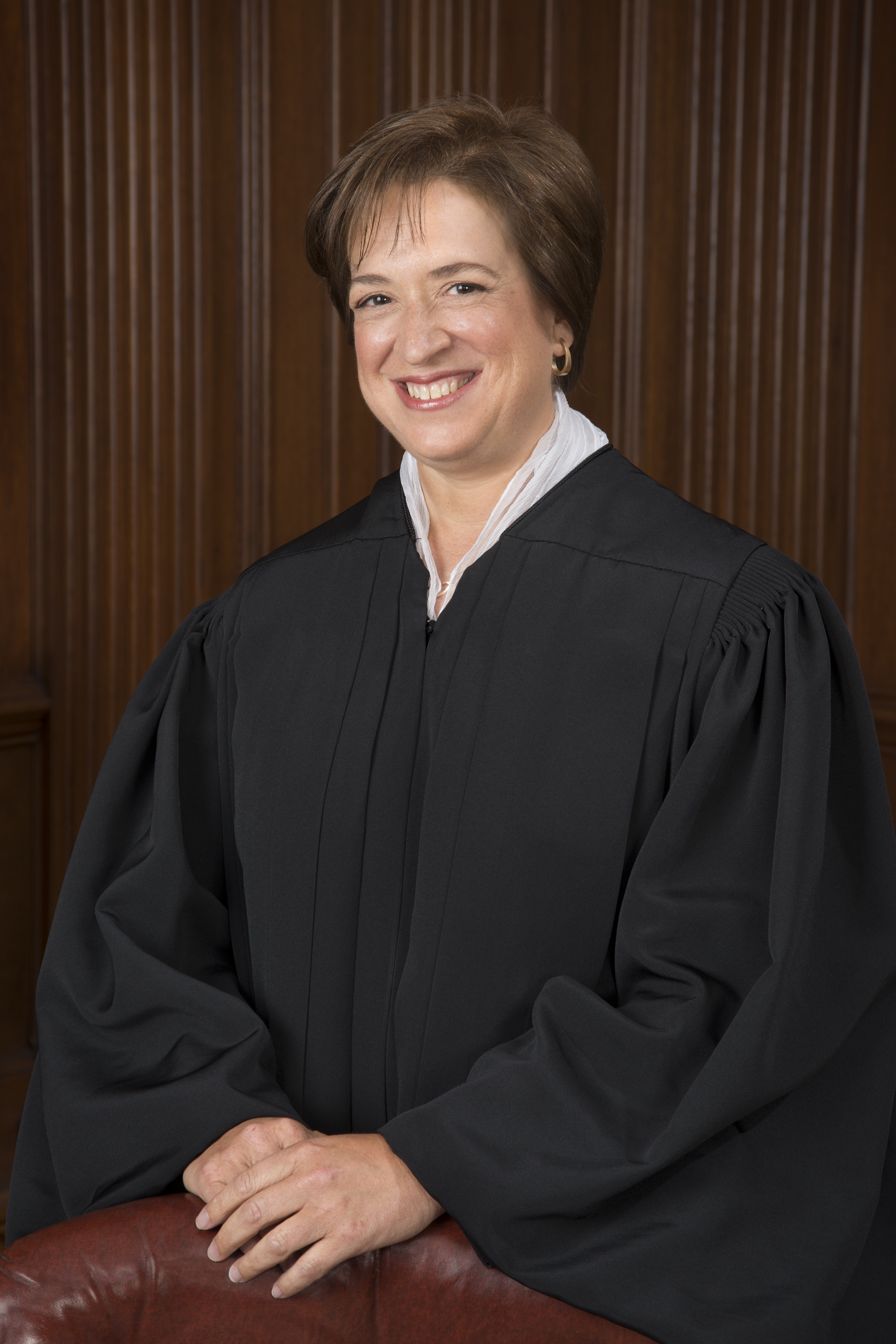
Justice Elena Kagan, 2013

Like Sotomayor, Kagan liberally illustrated her opinion with images of artwork. Not only did she reprint both Goldsmith's photograph and Orange Prince, she used other works by Warhol and, in the later sections, paintings by Diego Velázquez, Titian, Giorgione and Francis Bacon to make her points about the historic role of copying and transforming in art.

Kagan accused the majority of deciding the case on the basis of "a marketing decision: In the[ir] view, Warhol's licensing of the silkscreen to a magazine precludes fair use." By doing so they had wrongly mooted the question of what value, if any, Warhol's work had added to Goldsmith's. "Because the artist had such a commercial purpose, all the creativity in the world could not save him", she wrote. "That doctrinal shift ill serves copyright's core purpose."

Kagan questioned why the editors of Vanity Fair, and later at Condé Nast, would have chosen Warhol's work if it had indeed added nothing to Goldsmith's photo:

All I can say is that it's a good thing the majority isn't in the magazine business. Of course you would care! You would be drawn aesthetically to one, or instead to the other. You would want to convey the message of one, or instead of the other. The point here is not that one is better and the other worse. The point is that they are fundamentally different.

The majority, Kagan continued, had forgotten that "the more transformative the work, the less commercialism matters", as its decisions in Campbell v. Acuff-Rose Music, Inc. and Google, both cases where the allegedly infringing work had been made for primarily and purely commercial purposes respectively, showed. Indeed, in the latter case the Court had even cited Warhol's work as an example of how transformative use benefited society. "[W]hat he did to the Goldsmith photo, in service of what objects—counts powerfully in his favor. He started with an old photo, but he created a new new thing."

Kagan was especially critical of the majority's conclusion that the two works had the same "essential nature":

The description is disheartening. It's as though Warhol is an Instagram filter, and a simple one at that (e.g., sepia-tinting). "What is all the fuss about?," the majority wants to know. Ignoring reams of expert evidence—explaining, as every art historian could explain, exactly what the fuss is about—the majority plants itself firmly in the "I could paint that" school of art criticism. No wonder the majority sees the two images as essentially fungible products in the magazine market—publish this one, publish that one, what does it matter?

Lastly, Kagan said the majority had, by placing such value on the commercial use of Orange Prince, conflated the first factor with the fourth, market harm, when it held that the commercial use on the tribute magazine cover adversely affected Goldsmith's market for later use of the image. "Under the statute, courts are supposed to strike a balance between the two—and thus between rewarding original creators and enabling others to build on their works", she wrote. "That cannot happen when a court, à la the majority, double-counts the first goal and ignores the second."

The Court, she concluded, had so severely misinterpreted the relevant prior precedents as to chill transformative artistic expression with prior works and "will stifle creativity of every sort".

== On remand ==
In March 2024, after a joint motion by both parties, the Southern District awarded Goldsmith over $21,000 in damages for lost profits and court costs. Goldsmith said she would not continue action against the remainder of the Prince series, as the statute of limitations had expired.

== Reaction ==
Goldsmith, who had sold her home in Aspen, Colorado, moved to a Nashville home she mortgaged and set up a GoFundMe page to pay the $2.5 million in legal fees she incurred, said that although she had been "incredibly hopeful", she knew victory was not guaranteed. "[I]f you don't stand up for your rights, you lose them ... I still can't really breathe the sigh of relief that I would like to." Goldsmith was particularly disappointed by Kagan's dissent: "This would be a blow to artists? No." Later in 2023 she said her lawyers had agreed that beyond a certain point they would be handling the case pro bono. At that point she had raised merely $68,000 through her GoFundMe page. "When I started out as the Joan of Arc of copyright, I did not think my dress was going to be burning all the way up to my waist, you know?"

Adam Gopnik wrote in The New Yorker that he found the combativeness between Sotomayor and Kagan refreshing. "We live in an era of such ideological solidarity, for reasons good and bad, among people who are perceived to be on the same 'side,' that any little peek of serious debate between them seems wholesome, not to mention welcome." He suggested the two might agree that "the quality we think of as added artfulness in a borrowed image is almost always much closer to parody than to piety." While Kagan's defense of transformation in art was admirable on its face, Gopnik found it:

... perhaps a bit needlessly anodyne. The image of virtuous artists happily passing around pictures for general improvement belongs more to a progressive kindergarten than to the actual processes of art, which are more often moved by rancor, Oedipal drama, and competitive put-downs. The point of vital recycling is most often not to encourage communal creativity but to give a kick in the pants to the past.

Commentators focused on the art world expressed concern that appropriation art, exemplified by the Prince Series, could suffer as a result of the decision. "[It] took this already complex area of law and made it even more complicated", wrote NYU law professor Amy Adler in Art in America. "But one thing is clear: it is now far riskier for an artist to borrow from previous work ... Any artist who works with existing imagery should now reconsider her practice. Hire a lawyer, maybe try to negotiate a license and be ready to move on if you get turned away or can't afford the fee."

At Artnet, Marjorie Heins, director of the American Civil Liberties Union's Arts Censorship Project, said the Court had held for Goldsmith out of "sympathy for Goldsmith, the working journalist, and a resentment of the Warhol Foundation, with its aura of art world glamor and privilege." The decision was "disastrously wrong", as under the distinction between commercial and non-commercial use it applied "artists, dealers, curators, collectors, and everyone else in the art world must make a case-by-case guess whether a creative work that started out as fair use will lose that defense under copyright law depending on how it's shown, sold, or marketed." Peter Karol in Artforum echoed those concerns, but ultimately interpreted the Court's goal as "a reenergized licensing market for source works used in follow-on art practices."

Adler later allowed to Gopnik's brother Blake, a Warhol biographer, writing for The New York Times, that Warhol was a "unicorn" in the art world due to the large market for licensing his works. As a result, the ruling was "irrelevant to most artists". She nevertheless saw problems if future creators in Goldsmith's situation sought to charge exorbitant sums for licensing.

Others Gopnik talked to criticized the scope of the decision. "If it's fair use, it should be fair use to do whatever you want with it", Eric Doeringer, another appropriation artist, told him. Virginia Rutledge, a former curator who became a lawyer and co-wrote a brief in Cariou, feared that artists like Doeringer might "slide down the fear hill" and limit themselves only to creating art from works they could license.

Another Artnet commentator, Ben Davis, said later that this apprehension missed the point. "I think the interesting question ... is this: Do we actually believe, when it comes to 'fair use,' in a 'celebrity-artist exception?'" The art world's "defensively maximalist" stance on appropriation had led to it giving too much credence to Kagan's dissent, he said.

Orange Prince and the series it came from are widely accepted as not among Warhol's best works, Davis wrote. "The Prince image is hack work. That is not an opinion of the '"I could paint that" school of art criticism'; it's a common critical take on the late Warhol". The artist, says Davis, was more preoccupied with funding his lifestyle and side projects like Interview magazine than further testing the limits of his art. "Kagan is appalled that the majority acts as if Warhol was just applying a Warhol 'Instagram filter'—but that's not too far from what he was doing in this case."

A decade earlier, Davis recalled, the art world had been less sympathetic when Los Angeles street artist Mr. Brainwash lost an infringement suit brought by British photographer Dennis Morris over the former's takes on a famous photo of Sid Vicious, takes that involved more alteration than Warhol's work made to Goldsmith. Sotomayor's emphasis on the use of the image seemed to Davis more useful than Kagan's expansive embrace of transformativeness, especially with the unknown effects artificial intelligence might turn out to have. "[I]t's not going to help the creative industries in navigating this perilous terrain if they remain completely attached to an automatic romanticization of Warhol-ian appropriation. It might actually be useful to think in a nuanced way about how the Warhol of 1964 is different than the Warhol of 1984 if we are going to find a way through the world of 2024."

== See also ==
- List of United States Supreme Court copyright case law
- List of United States Supreme Court cases by the Roberts Court
