= Cariou =

Cariou is a surname. Notable people with the name include:

The Breton etymology of Cariou (friend) is from Gallo-Roman name Carus and Carius (dear, darling).

- Corentin Cariou (1898–1942), born in Loctudy, alderman of the 19th arrondissement of Paris, shot as a hostage during the occupation. An avenue in Paris and a subway station named after him in this district.
- Corentin Cariou, pseudonym of Yves Le Drézen (1899–1972), journalist
- Jacques Cariou, Eventing rider
- Len Cariou (born 1939), Canadian actor
- Patrick Cariou, photographer, or Cariou v. Prince, a US Second Circuit copyright case about art
- Warren Cariou, writer and associate professor of English at the University of Manitoba
