= Cariou v. Prince =

2013 copyright case in the United States

- Court: United States Court of Appeals for the Second Circuit
- Citation: 714 F.3d 694

Case history
- Prior history: 784 F. Supp. 2d 337 (S.D.N.Y. 2011).

Court membership
- Judges sitting: Barrington Daniels Parker Jr., Peter W. Hall, J. Clifford Wallace (9th Cir.)

Case opinions
- Majority: Parker, joined by Hall
- Concur/dissent: Wallace

Cariou v. Prince, 714 F.3d 694 (2d Cir. 2013) is a copyright case of the United States Court of Appeals for the Second Circuit, on the question of whether artist Richard Prince's appropriation art treatment of Patrick Cariou's photographs was copyright infringement or fair use. The Second Circuit held in 2013 that Prince's appropriation art could constitute fair use, and that a number of his works were transformative fair uses of Cariou's photographs. The Court remanded to the United States District Court for the Southern District of New York for reconsideration of five of Prince's works. The Supreme Court denied Cariou's petition for a writ of certiorari, and the case settled in 2014.

Cariou was criticized, both by academics and other courts, for giving too much weight to transformative use in determining fair use. In 2021, another Second Circuit panel hearing Andy Warhol Foundation for the Visual Arts, Inc. v. Goldsmith on appeal, decided that "some clarification is in order" since the trial court had read too much into its decision that Andy Warhol's Orange Prince had sufficiently transformed the photograph it was based on as not to be infringing. Two years later the U.S. Supreme Court affirmed the decision.

== Background ==
Patrick Cariou published Yes, Rasta, a book of his black and white photographs of the Rastafarian community in Jamaica, in 2000. Eight years later Richard Prince created Canal Zone, a series of art works incorporating Cariou's photographs. Prince's works involved copying the original photographs and engaging in a variety of transformations. These included printing them, increasing them in size, blurring or sharpening, adding content (sometimes in color), and sometimes compositing multiple photographs together or with other works. Prince exhibited his collection at Gagosian Gallery in New York as appropriation art.

In 2009, Cariou filed a copyright infringement suit against Richard Prince, as well as Gagosian Gallery, Larry Gagosian (the founder and owner of the gallery), and RCS MediaGroup (which printed the exhibit catalog).

== Findings ==
The Southern District of New York (SDNY), in March 2011, held that Prince's works were infringing. At that point, the Cariou v. Prince case received significant attention, because the court ordered that Prince's unsold works, and Rizzoli's catalogs, be impounded and destroyed. The SDNY found that the works were not transformative, in part because Richard Prince did not claim to be "commenting upon" the original works.

Prince, whose works often sell in galleries for many thousands of dollars, appealed to the Second Circuit. The case was of high interest to the art world, which largely favored Prince's position, and to the photographic community, which largely favored Cariou's position.

In April 2013, the Second Circuit reversed the lower court, finding that most of Prince's works were indeed "transformative" to a "reasonable observer" and therefore fair use. In particular, the circuit found that the lower court erred in requiring that the appropriating artist claim to be commenting on the original work, and found works to be transformative if they presented a new aesthetic. "A secondary work may constitute a fair use even if it serves some purpose other than those (criticism, comment, news reporting, teaching, scholarship, and research) identified in the preamble to the statute", wrote Judge Barrington Daniels Parker for the three-judge panel."Our conclusion should not be taken to suggest, however, that any cosmetic changes to the photographs would necessarily constitute fair use."

One of Cariou's photos (left), along with the photo titled 'Graduation', by Prince (right) (one of the five photos that the Second Circuit remanded back to the trial court for further consideration)

The court found 25 of 30 works to be transformative fair use under its standard, and remanded the case to the lower court for reconsideration of five of the works under the Second Circuit's new standard. In a separate opinion that concurred in part and dissented in part, Judge J. Clifford Wallace of the Ninth Circuit, sitting by designation, said that while he agreed with the general principles of transformative use the court had articulated, having done so the court should have remanded all the Prince images to the district court for reconsideration under that standard, more in keeping with general procedure. (Note: "[W]hile I admit freely that I am not an art critic or expert, I fail to see how the majority in its appellate role can 'confidently' draw a distinction between the twenty-five works that it has identified as constituting fair use and the five works that do not readily lend themselves to a fair use determination ... If the district court is in the best position to determine fair use as to some paintings, why is the same not true as to all paintings? Certainly we are not merely to use our personal art views to make the new legal application to the facts of this case." Cariou, 713–14)

Wallace also differed over the exclusion of Prince's statements as to his intent in creating his derivative work. Conceding that in Blanch v. Koons the circuit had cautioned that such statements were not the "sine qua non" in determining fair use, he pointed out that it had considered those statements in Castle Rock Entertainment, Inc. v. Carol Publishing Group Inc..

In 2014, Cariou and Prince settled the case before it was reheard in district court.

== Subsequent jurisprudence ==
In Kienitz v. Sconnie Nation, a case decided by the Seventh Circuit in 2014, a photographer alleged that an altered photograph of his of a local mayor used on a T-shirt that mocked the subject was infringing. A unanimous panel rejected the claim, but nonetheless was leery of Cariou as a precedent. Judge Frank Easterbrook said the court was "skeptical", since they feared it could be read as displacing the other factors in the fair-use inquiry, to the point that almost any transformative use would be sufficient. "To say that a new use transforms the work is precisely to say that it is derivative", he wrote. "Cariou and its predecessors in the Second Circuit do not explain how every 'transformative use' can be 'fair use' without extinguishing the author's rights under [the law]. We think it best to stick to the statutory list."

The Second Circuit acknowledged Kienitz as well as similar criticism in Nimmer on Copyright when it decided TCA Television Corp. v. McCollum in 2016, even as it called Cariou "[the] high-water mark of our court's recognition of transformative works". There, the petitioners claimed the respondent playwright had infringed their copyright on the Abbott and Costello "Who's On First?" comedy routine by including a minute worth of it in his play Hand of God. While it was found transformative use did not apply because the excerpt of the routine was used without alteration (McCollum's arguments that it was used more dramatically in the play notwithstanding), the court held for the respondent because the petitioners could not establish the validity of the copyright, which the Copyright Office had concluded expired in 1972 after it was not renewed.

=== Andy Warhol Foundation for the Visual Arts, Inc. v. Goldsmith ===
The Second Circuit would revisit the case more significantly in Andy Warhol Foundation for the Visual Arts, Inc. v. Goldsmith, brought by rock photographer Lynn Goldsmith when she sought royalties from the foundation, which has administered Warhol's work since his death in 1987. She had learned only in 2016, when Orange Prince, one of the artist's Prince Series, was used for a memorial magazine cover following Prince's death, that Warhol had used a 1981 photograph of Prince she had licensed to Condé Nast in 1984 as a reference for the series, and sought a share of royalties for the reuse. Federal judge John Koeltl, who heard the case in the Southern District of New York, relied on Cariou to hold that the Warhol works were transformative, "add[ing] something new to the world of art and the public would be deprived of this contribution if the works could not be distributed", and so finding for the foundation on three of the four fair-use factors. In a footnote, Koeltl acknowledged criticism of Cariou for promoting overreliance on transformative use but said he was bound by it as circuit precedent and the circuit's history of giving transformative use great weight.

Goldsmith appealed to the Second Circuit, which reversed Koeltl. Among the other factors that led the panel to that outcome was how he had applied Cariou. Acknowledging the same criticism it had in McCollum, this time Judge Gerard Lynch wrote:

While we remain bound by Cariou, and have no occasion or desire to question its correctness on its own facts, our review of the decision below persuades us that some clarification is in order ... [B]oth the Supreme Court and this Court have emphasized that fair use is a context-sensitive inquiry that does not lend itself to simple bright-line rules.(citations omitted) Notwithstanding, the district court appears to have read Cariou as having announced such a rule, to wit, that any secondary work is necessarily transformative as a matter of law '[i]f looking at the works side-by-side, the secondary work has a different character, a new expression, and employs new aesthetics with [distinct] creative and communicative results.'"(citations omitted) Although a literal construction of certain passages of Cariou may support that proposition, such a reading stretches the decision too far.

Reviewing Cariou and other cases, Lynch found a commonality among works not adjudged transformative, including five of Prince's photographs in Cariou that it had remanded to the district court to decide. "[W]here a secondary work does not obviously comment on or relate back to the original or use the original for a purpose other than that for which it was created, the bare assertion of a 'higher or different artistic use,'" he wrote, "is insufficient to render a work transformative. Rather, the secondary work itself must reasonably be perceived as embodying a distinct artistic purpose, one that conveys a new meaning or message separate from its source material."

In 2023, the foundation appealed to the Supreme Court, which affirmed the Second Circuit in a 7–2 decision. Justice Sonia Sotomayor's majority opinion reiterated its holding that, since the instance complained of the two images were used for a similar commercial purpose, they were not dissimilar enough for the Warhol to be fair use even though Warhol might have been showing Prince as an iconic celebrity, stripped of the vulnerability he had shown in Goldsmith's photo. In dissent, Justice Elena Kagan criticized the majority harshly for what she saw as its failure to appreciate the value of copying and transforming in art.
