= Castle Rock Entertainment, Inc. v. Carol Publishing Group Inc. =

1998 US legal case

Castle Rock Entertainment Inc. v. Carol Publishing Group
- Court: United States Court of Appeals for the Second Circuit
- Full case name: Castle Rock Entertainment Inc. v. Carol Publishing Group Inc.
- Decided: July 10, 1998
- Citation: 150 F.3d 132

Case history
- Prior actions: 955 F. Supp. 260 (S.D.N.Y. 1997) Granting summary judgment for Castle Rock Entertainment, awarding damages for copyright infringement and enjoining Carol Publishing from further publication of its book.
- Subsequent action: none

Court membership
- Judges sitting: John M. Walker, Jr., and Ellsworth Van Graafeiland, circuit judges; and Jed S. Rakoff, district judge, S.D.N.Y., sitting by designation

Case opinions
- Book containing Seinfeld trivia questions satisfied both quantitative and qualitative analysis to establish prima facie case of copyright infringement. Book did not constitute fair use of Seinfeld

Castle Rock Entertainment Inc. v. Carol Publishing Group, 150 F.3d 132 (2d Cir. 1998), was a U.S. copyright infringement case involving the popular American sitcom Seinfeld. Some U.S. copyright law courses use the case to illustrate modern application of the fair use doctrine. The United States Court of Appeals for the Second Circuit upheld a lower court's summary judgment that the defendant had committed copyright infringement. The decision is noteworthy for classifying Seinfeld trivia not as unprotected facts, but as protectable expression. The court also rejected the defendant's fair use defense finding that any transformative purpose possessed in the derivative work was "slight to non-existent" under the Supreme Court ruling in Campbell v. Acuff-Rose Music, Inc., 510 U.S. 569 (1994).

== Facts of the case ==
Castle Rock Entertainment is the copyright holder and producer of each episode of the sitcom Seinfeld. Beth Golub wrote SAT: The Seinfeld Aptitude Test a 132-page book containing 643 trivia questions and answers about the events and characters depicted in Seinfeld through her publisher, Carol Publishing Group. The book contained 211 multiple choice questions, in which only one out of three to five answers were correct; 93 matching questions; and a number of short-answer questions. The questions were divided into five levels of difficulty, labeled (in increasing order of difficulty) "Wuss Questions," "This, That, and the Other Questions," "Tough Monkey Questions," "Atomic Wedgie Questions," and "Master of Your Domain Questions." An example from the public record of one of the "Wuss Questions":

1. To impress a woman, George passes himself off as

a) a gynecologist

b) a geologist

c) a marine biologist

d) a meteorologist

The book drew from 84 Seinfeld episodes that had been broadcast as of the time that the Carol Group published The SAT. While Golub had created the incorrect answers, the questions and correct answers were grounded in some part to a Seinfeld episode. A significant number of questions contained dialogue from the show. The name "Seinfeld" was displayed prominently throughout the book, and it contained pictures of the show's actors on several pages. The back cover contained a disclaimer which read, "This book has not been approved or licensed by any entity involved in creating or producing Seinfeld."

At first publication, the book did not provoke a lawsuit. Instead, NBC requested several free copies and distributed them with promotions for the program. One of the show's executive producers exclaimed that The SAT was a "fun little book." Seinfeld's audience grew after The SAT was first published. Nevertheless, Castle Rock had been very selective in its licenses of Seinfeld merchandise, and had rejected numerous products previously to the publication of The SAT.

== Procedural history ==
In November 1994, Castle Rock contacted Carol Publishing Group concerning its copyright and trademark infringement claims. Carol Publishing continued to publish The SAT and in February 1995, Castle Rock filed an action in Federal District Court alleging federal copyright and trademark infringement and state law unfair competition. Both defendant and plaintiff moved for summary judgment.

Castle Rock succeeded in its motion for summary judgment. In 1997, Judge Sonia Sotomayor of the United States District Court for the Southern District of New York held that Carol had infringed on Castle Rock's copyrights in Seinfeld and further that the copying was not fair use. The district court entered final judgment against Carol and awarded Castle Rock $403,000 with interest in damages. It permanently enjoined Carol from publishing or distributing The SAT, and ordered that all copies in Carol's possession be destroyed. Carol appealed.

== Ruling of the appeals court ==
=== Plaintiff has a prima facie case for copyright infringement ===
The appeals court noted that there was no dispute as to whether Castle Rock owned a valid copyright in Seinfeld nor was it disputed that Carol Publishing copied material from the shows. The question was only of misappropriation of protectable material.

The appeals court employed both a "qualitative vs. quantitative" method and a "total concept and feel" approach in determining if Carol Publishing had misappropriated Seinfeld.

The qualitative vs. quantitative approach sought to determine if the quality of the copied work was actionable in an infringement lawsuit and if the quantity of the copied work was enough to stake a claim. The court chose to take the Seinfeld series as a whole, rather than compare the quantity of copied work from each of the 84 episodes individually. Altogether, The SAT contained 643 fragments from the entire series. The court held that this was a sufficient quantity of copying to overcome the de minimis threshold alleged by Carol Publishing. When analyzing the quality of the copied material, the court rejected the defendant's position that Seinfeld trivia constituted facts and was therefore not covered by copyright protection. It reasoned that the "facts" portrayed in Seinfeld originated in the fictitious expression by the writers of the show. The court noted that the book did not quiz readers on such facts as the location of the Seinfeld set or the biographies of the actors, but on characters and events springing from the imagination of the show's authors. Normally, the court would have eliminated those elements that did not meet the quality requirements through the subtraction method in misappropriation analysis, but in finding nothing to subtract the court held that the plaintiffs had established a prima facie case.

Nevertheless, Carol Publishing urged the court to consider the "total concept and feel" approach rather than the subtraction method. The court noted that because the two works were of different genres, other approaches would be less helpful. An "ordinary observer", the intended audience, might be misguided in the differences between a book and television program to accurately compare each work's total concept. The book contained no theme or plot, but only a random and scattered collection of questions, its only concept being a test of Seinfeld trivia. From this analysis, the court justified its approach and illustrated the possible different outcome it may have reached had it accepted the defendant's proposed analysis.

=== Defendant's infringement does not constitute fair use ===
The court provided a substantial analysis of Carol Publishing's fair use defense. Of particular interest was its handling of the "transformative use" standard established in the Supreme Court's opinion in Campbell. The court noted that the fundamental purpose of the fair use doctrine is "promoting the Progress of Science and Useful Arts."

==== Transformative use under the purpose and character standard ====
The court held that the book's intended commercial use weighed against a finding of fair use. In citing Campbell, "no man but a blockhead ever wrote, except for money." But the court further held that the more critical inquiry was whether The SAT merely supplanted the Seinfeld episodes or rather if it added something new, providing new insights, new aesthetics in the manner that the fair use doctrine was meant to enrich society.

The defendants claimed two arguments of transformative qualities in The SAT: first that the subject matter of the work did not bar a finding of fair use, and second that the book was a critique of the show. Specifically, the defendants stylized The SAT as a work "decoding the obsession with and mystique that surrounds Seinfeld by critically restructuring Seinfeld's mystique into a system complete with varying levels of 'mastery' that relate the reader's control of the show's trivia to knowledge of and identification with their hero, Jerry Seinfeld." In response, Castle Rock retorted that "had defendants been half as creative in creating The SAT as were their lawyers in crafting these arguments about transformation, defendants might have a colorable fair use claim."

The court rejected the defendants' arguments holding that any transformative purpose posed by the book was slight or non-existent. It concluded that the purpose of the book was to entertain the Seinfeld audience with a book about Seinfeld, much the same purpose as the television show. Finally, the court noted a potential source of confusion between the "transformative use" doctrine and derivative works. The court emphasized that derivative works were based upon preexisting works. They transformed an original work into a new mode of expression, but unlike a work of fair use expression, a derivative work's purpose was not transformed. In addition, when a derivative work transformed an original work into a new mode of expression such that little similarity remained, it would not infringe the copyright of the original work.

==== Nature of the copyrighted work ====
The court looked to the second statutory factor under the Copyright Act of 1976: the nature of the copyrighted work. A work's nature "calls for recognition that some works are closer to the core of intended copyright protection than others, with consequence that fair use is more difficult to establish when the former works are copied." The court held that the nature of Seinfeld was fictional, and the second factor tends to favor works based on fact. Works of fiction generally enjoy greater copyright protection because of their higher content of protectible material. However, the court noted that transformative use can lessen the importance of the nature of the copyrighted work, but since The SAT held slight or non-existent transformative purpose, the fictional nature of Seinfeld disfavored a finding a fair use.

==== Amount and substantiality of the portion taken ====
The third factor analyzed by the court was whether the portion of copying furthered the purpose and character of use or whether it went beyond what was necessary. Here again, the transformative use affected the court's analysis. Use of a substantial part or the "heart" of a protected work is justified when the character of the work is criticism or parody, because these expressions necessarily demand a greater quantity to be useful. The court reasoned that a greater degree of material from Seinfeld would be necessary for an accurate critique of the show's "nothingness", but because the court found little transformative use for the purposes of critique, this weighed against defendants. Indeed, the court reasoned that the 643 copied elements in the trivia questions was a substantial portion taken for the rather "straight forward" commentary of Seinfeld's meaninglessness, and this weighed against fair use.

==== Effect of use on the market ====
The court noted that the fourth factor was not to be given the greatest weight, but to be taken equally with the other three in a determination of fair use. The analysis for market effect does not look to whether the secondary work detracts from market of the copyrighted work, but rather does it substitute the market of the original (the nature of copyright as a monopoly on publication does not permit a substitution). The court held that the differences in form between The SAT and Seinfeld and the lack of transformative purpose made the book a derivative work in a derivative market. Because the SAT was the only Seinfeld trivia book in existence, it completely substituted this derivative market for the show. The court further reasoned that even though Castle Rock did not intend to enter the trivia book market, the existence of The SAT effectively usurped its right to do so. If the derivative market was one that the copyright holder would generally develop or license, a secondary author would be barred from entering it. On the other hand, if the market was one generally protected by fair use, such as criticism, parody, or academic scholarship, the copyright holder could not enter those markets and attempt to preclude secondary authors from entering.

==== Other factors affecting fair use ====
The court noted that the four factors enumerated in the fair use statute are not exclusive, but are only a guide in the analysis. The court held that it was irrelevant whether Carol Publishing continued to distribute The SAT after Castle Rock notified it of its infringement claim, because such distribution would have been justified if the book was a fair use of Seinfeld. The court concluded that other considerations affecting fair use such as the 1st Amendment and the public interest were not relevant to the case. When taking all factors together, the court held that the book was not fair use. In a final footnote, the opinion provided an answer key to all trivia questions contained therein.
