= Rogers v. Koons =

American copyright law case

- Court: United States Court of Appeals for the Second Circuit
- Full case name: Art Rogers v. Jeff Koons; Sonnabend Gallery, Inc.
- Argued: October 3, 1991
- Decided: April 2, 1992
- Citations: 960 F.2d 301; 1992 U.S. App. LEXIS 5792; 22 U.S.P.Q.2D (BNA) 1492; Copy. L. Rep. (CCH) ¶ 26,893; 20 Media L. Rep. 1201

Case history
- Subsequent history: Cert. denied, 506 U.S. 934 (1992)
- Procedural history: Summary judgment granted in part to plaintiff, 751 F. Supp. 474 (S.D.N.Y. 1990); amended on rehearing, 777 F. Supp. 1 (S.D.N.Y. 1991)

Holding
- An artist who reproduced a photograph as a three-dimensional sculpture for sale as high-priced art could not claim parody as a defense for copyright infringement, when the photograph itself was not the target of his parody.

Court membership
- Judges sitting: Circuit Judges Richard J. Cardamone, Lawrence Warren Pierce, John M. Walker, Jr.

Case opinions
- Majority: Cardamone, joined by Pierce, Walker

Laws applied
- 17 U.S.C. § 101, et. seq. (Copyright Act of 1976)

Rogers v. Koons, 960 F.2d 301 (2d Cir. 1992), is a leading U.S. court case on copyright, dealing with the fair use defense for parody. The United States Court of Appeals for the Second Circuit found that an artist copying a photograph could be liable for infringement when there was no clear need to imitate the photograph for parody.

== Background ==
Art Rogers' photograph (left), Jeff Koons' work (right)

Art Rogers, a professional photographer, took a black-and-white photo of a man and a woman with their arms full of puppies. The photograph was simply entitled, Puppies, and was used on greeting cards and other generic merchandise.

Jeff Koons, an internationally known artist, found the picture on a postcard and wanted to make a sculpture based on the photograph for an art show on the theme of banality of everyday items. After removing the copyright label from the postcard, he gave it to his assistants with instructions on how to model the sculpture. He asked that as much detail be copied as possible, though the puppies were to be made blue, their noses exaggerated, and flowers to be added to the hair of the man and woman.

The sculpture, titled String of Puppies, became a success. Koons sold three copies of it for a total of $367,000.

Upon discovering that his picture had been copied, Rogers sued Koons and the Sonnabend Gallery for copyright infringement. Koons admitted to having copied the image intentionally, but attempted to claim fair use by parody.

== Opinion of the court ==
The court found both "substantial similarity" and that Koons had access to the picture. The similarity was so close that the average lay person would recognize the copying, a measure for evaluation. Thus the sculpture was found to be a copy of the work by Rogers.

On the issue of fair use, the court rejected the parody argument, as Koons could have constructed his parody of that general type of art without copying Rogers' specific work. That is, Koons was not commenting on Rogers' work specifically, and so his copying of that work did not fall under the fair use exception.

== Award ==
The Court of Appeals determined that there were issues of fact and remanded the issue of damages to the District Court. Koons and Rogers, however, reached a confidential settlement.

== See also ==
- Blanch v. Koons, 2006 case where Koons was sued over the reuse of part of a photo, and prevailed on fair-use grounds
