= Kienitz v. Sconnie Nation =

2014 U.S. court case on copyright law

- Court: United States Court of Appeals for the Seventh Circuit
- Full case name: Michael Kienitz v. Sconnie Nation LLC and Underground Printing-Wisconsin LLC
- Decided: September 15, 2014
- Citation: 766 F.3d 756

Case history
- Appealed from: W.D.Wis.
- Subsequent actions: en banc rehearing denied; October 14, 2014

Court membership
- Judges sitting: William J. Bauer, Frank Easterbrook and Ann Claire Williams

Case opinions
- Photograph of city mayor used on T-shirt criticizing him was sufficiently altered from original to be transformative regardless of commercial use since alterations removed copyrightable aspects of image. Western District of Wisconsin affirmed
- Decision by: Easterbrook

Keywords
- copyright; fair use; transformative use

Kienitz v. Sconnie Nation, 766 F.3d 756 (7th Cir. 2014) is a copyright case in the United States Court of Appeals for the Seventh Circuit, on the question of whether the use of a photograph used by printing and t-shirt company Sconnie Nation, LLC, was a copyright infringement or fair use. The photo in question had been taken by Michael Kienitz and was of Paul Soglin, mayor of Madison, Wisconsin. The photo had been heavily abstracted and colorized for use on a T-shirt that said "Sorry for Partying," which referred to Soglin's attempt to shut down the annual Mifflin Street Block Party that he himself had attended in his youth. The Seventh Circuit held in 2014 that Sconnie Nation's use was fair, applying the fair use statutory defense and relying most heavily on the lack of any effect on the market for the original photograph, rather than on its use as commentary on the mayor. While affirming the grant of summary judgment to the defendants, the opinion notes that Kienitz did not argue that his reputation for only licensing flattering uses had been harmed by the defendants' use, and stated that there was no reason that the defendants needed to use the specific photograph.
