= Andrea Blanch =

American photographer

- Born: Brooklyn, New York
- Education: Ohio State University (B.A.)
- Occupations: Photographer, founder of Musée Magazine

Andrea Blanch, is an American portrait, commercial, and fine art photographer.

Blanch was born in Brooklyn and raised in Great Neck, New York. She graduated from Ohio State University with a Bachelor of Arts in Painting.

After working under Richard Avedon, Blanch embarked on her own career with Vogue and Elle, later diversifying to celebrity portraits and editorial work. Blanch has had photographs featured on the album covers and in Rolling Stone magazine. Her commercial clients have included Gucci, Bergdorf Goodman, Adrienne Vittadini.

After contributing to books, Italian Men: Love and Sex was published in 1998. Italian Men is a compendium of interviews and photographs of Famous Italian men Including Giorgio Armani, Valentino Garavani, Luciano Pavarotti and Franco Zeffirelli.

In 2006, a lawsuit she brought against appropriation artist Jeff Koons, alleging copyright infringement over his unlicensed reuse of a part of a photograph she had taken for Allure in one of his artworks, became a precedent that expanded the scope of transformative use in deciding fair use.

== Solo exhibitions ==
- Serge Sorokko Gallery, New York: "Italian Men: Love and Sex" -
- Staley Wise Gallery, New York: "Unexpected Company" - 2006
- La Galerie Basia Embiricos,: "Sensuous" - 2009
