= Fordham Intellectual Property, Media & Entertainment Law Journal =

- Table of contents of Vol. 15, No. 1 (2004)
- Discipline: Law
- Language: English
- Edited by: Hanna Feldman

Publication details
- History: 1990–present
- Publisher: Fordham School of Law (United States)
- Frequency: 2/year
- Impact factor: 0.55 (2019)

Standard abbreviations
- Bluebook: Fordham Intell. Prop. Media & Ent. L.J.
- ISO 4: Fordham Intellect. Prop. Media Entertain. Law J.

Indexing
- ISSN: 1079-9699

Links
- Journal homepage

The Fordham Intellectual Property, Media & Entertainment Law Journal is a specialty law journal of Fordham University School of Law that publishes articles on topics in patent, trademark, copyright, First Amendment, and media law. According to the 2019 Washington & Lee journal and law review rankings, it is ranked number one in the US for intellectual property law, number two in communications and media law, number three for arts, entertainment, and sports law, and was the most cited US law journal devoted to intellectual property law. The Fordham IPLJ articles have been read into the Congressional Record, cited in the Court of Appeals for the Second Circuit, and in amicus briefs to the U.S. Supreme Court.

== Symposium ==
The journal hosts an annual IPLJ Symposium, where distinguished practitioners and legal scholars speak as panelists, covering present-day issues in copyright, patent, and trademark law.

== Podcast ==
The Fordham Intellectual Property, Media, & Entertainment Law Journal Podcast, established in 2016, explores the broad landscape of copyright, trademark, and patent law while tackling hot topics in entertainment and media. New episodes are released every Tuesday.

== See also ==
- List of intellectual property law journals
