= Toward a Fair Use Standard =

1990 law review article by Pierre N. Leval

"Toward a Fair Use Standard", 103 Harv. L. Rev. 1105 (1990), is a law review article on the fair use doctrine in US copyright law, written by then-District Court Judge Pierre N. Leval. The article argued that the most critical element of the fair use analysis is the transformativeness of a work, the first of the statutory factors listed in the Copyright Act of 1976, 17 U.S.C. § 107.

Leval's article is cited in the Supreme Court's 1994 decision in Campbell v. Acuff-Rose Music, Inc., which marked a shift in judicial treatment of fair use toward a transformativeness analysis and away from emphasizing the "commerciality" analysis of the fourth factor. Prior to Leval's article, the fourth factor had often been described as the most important of the factors.

In his article, Leval noted:

I believe the answer to the question of justification turns primarily on whether, and to what extent, the challenged use is transformative. The use must be productive and must employ the quoted matter in a different manner or for a different purpose from the original. ...[If] the secondary use adds value to the original—if the quoted matter is used as raw material, transformed in the creation of new information, new aesthetics, new insights and understandings—this is the very type of activity that the fair use doctrine intends to protect for the enrichment of society. Transformative uses may include criticizing the quoted work, exposing the character of the original author, proving a fact, or summarizing an idea argued in the original in order to defend or rebut it. They also may include parody, symbolism, aesthetic declarations, and innumerable other uses.

Leval's article was published with an accompanying article by Lloyd Weinreb "Fair's Fair: A Comment on the Fair Use Doctrine", 103 Harvard Law Review 1137 (1990), which generally critiqued Leval's thesis.
