= Visiting judge =

Judge appointed to hear a case in another court

A visiting judge is a judge appointed to hear a case as a member of a court to which he or she does not ordinarily belong. In United States federal courts, this is referred to as an assignment "by designation" of the chief justice of the United States (for inter-circuit assignments) or the circuit chief judge (for intra-circuit assignments), and is authorized by 28 U.S.C. § 292 (for active district judges) or 28 U.S.C. § 294 (for retired justices and judges).

In many United States Courts of Appeals it is not uncommon for a district judge to sit on a panel as a visiting judge; less frequently it is a judge from another circuit (in active service or, more commonly, in senior status). Retired Supreme Court justices have done the same, including Justices Sandra Day O'Connor, David Souter, and Stephen Breyer, and very unusually, sitting justices (in 1984, for example, Justice William Rehnquist served as a visiting judge for a jury trial in the United States District Court for the Eastern District of Virginia). This is sometimes done to ease caseload pressures, and sometimes (as in Rehnquist's case) for experience. In other cases, notably those of some judges in senior status, the individual may sit in a different court for personal reasons (such as in a person's hometown).
