= Outline of civil law (common law) =

Topical guide to civil law in common law countries

In common law jurisdictions such as England, Wales, and the United States, civil law refers to the branch of law that deals with non-criminal matters, including disputes between private individuals or organizations. This usage differs from that in civil law jurisdictions such as France, Germany, and China, where civil law refers to the codified legal system derived from Roman law. Within common law systems, civil law encompasses areas such as contracts, torts, and property, and may be divided into substantive and procedural law. Its primary concern is the rights and duties of individuals among themselves. Civil proceedings are generally intended to obtain compensation or another remedy, distinguishing them from criminal proceedings, which aim to impose punishment, though exemplary or punitive damages may occasionally be awarded in civil cases.

== Description ==
Civil law (in common law countries) can be described as all of the following:

- Branch of law dealing with non-criminal cases

== Branches of civil law ==
=== Substantive civil law ===
Substantive law

- Art and culture law
- Civil rights
- Commercial law
  - Contract law
    - Australian contract law
    - Canadian contract law
    - English contract law
    - Scots contract law
    - United States contract law
  - Labor law
- Environmental law
- Family law
- Property law
  - Cultural property law
  - Intellectual property law
  - Trust law
- Tort law
  - Personal injury
  - Tort law by common law country
    - Tort law in Australia
    - Canadian tort law
    - English tort law
    - Scots tort law
    - United States tort law

=== Procedural civil law ===
Procedural law

- Civil procedure

== History of civil law ==
- History of company law in the United Kingdom
- History of competition law
- History of English contract law
- History of equity and trusts
- History of labour law
  - History of labor law in the United States
  - History of labour law in the United Kingdom

== Lawsuits ==
- Lawsuit – suit, action, or cause instituted or depending between two private persons in the courts of law.

== Civil procedure ==
Civil procedure – body of law that sets out the rules and standards that courts follow when adjudicating civil lawsuits (as opposed to procedures in criminal law matters). These rules govern how a lawsuit or case may be commenced, what kind of service of process (if any) is required, the types of pleadings or statements of case, motions or applications, and orders allowed in civil cases, the timing and manner of depositions and discovery or disclosure, the conduct of trials, the process for judgment, various available remedies, and how the courts and clerks must function.

- Service of process
- Pleading – as practiced in countries that follow the English models, a pleading is a formal written statement of a party's claims or defenses to another party's claims in a civil action. The parties' pleadings in a case define the issues to be adjudicated in the action.
  - pleading in England and Wales
  - pleading in United States federal courts
- Motions
  - Motion in United States law
- Court orders
- Depositions
- Discovery
- Trial
- Judgments
- Legal remedies

=== Civil procedure by region ===
- Civil procedure in Brazil
- Civil procedure in Canada
- Civil procedure in England and Wales
  - Civil Procedure Rules (CPR)
- Civil procedure in South Africa
- Civil procedure in the United States
  - Federal Rules of Civil Procedure

== Civil law publications ==
- Journal of Tort Law

== Persons influential in civil law ==
- Oliver Wendell Holmes Jr.
- William Blackstone

== See also ==
- Outline of corporate finance
- Outline of law
