= Wanås Castle =

Castle in Östra Göinge Municipality, Scania, Sweden

- Wanås slott
- Östra Göinge Municipality
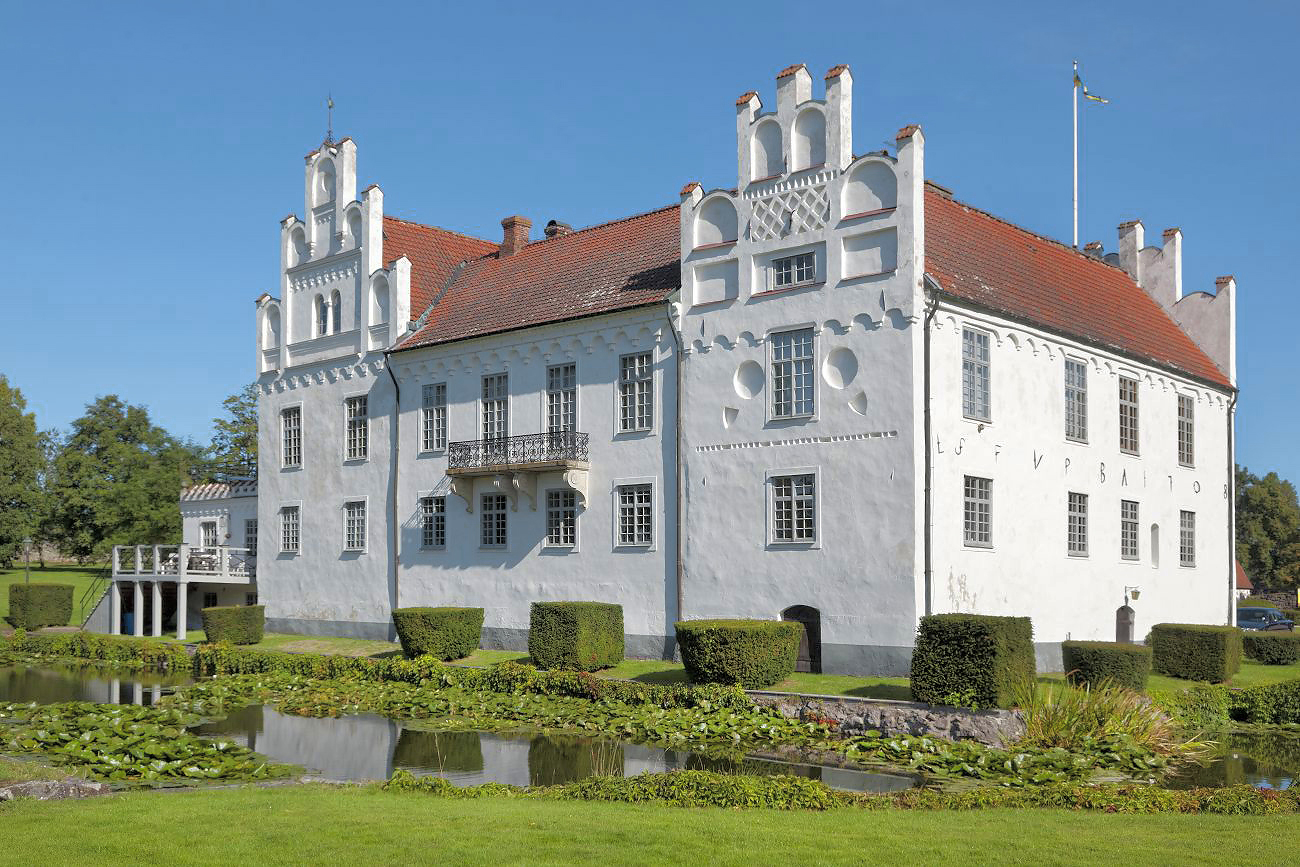
- Wanås

Site information
- Open to the public: No

Location
- Scania, Sweden
- Coordinates: 56.1860°N 14.0454°E

Site history
- Built: 15th century

Wanås Castle (IPA: [ˈvânːoːs]; Swedish: Wanås slott) is an estate in Östra Göinge Municipality, Scania, in southern Sweden. It is situated to the west of Knislinge, approximately 20 kilometres (12 mi) north of Kristianstad.

== Wanås exhibitions ==
Since 1987, contemporary art with a focus on site-specific installations has been displayed at Wanås. Art is displayed in the park and in exhibition halls in renovated stables and warehouse buildings from the 18th and 19th centuries. In the park there are some 70 sculptures and installations permanently on display.

== Selection of the outdoors exhibitions ==
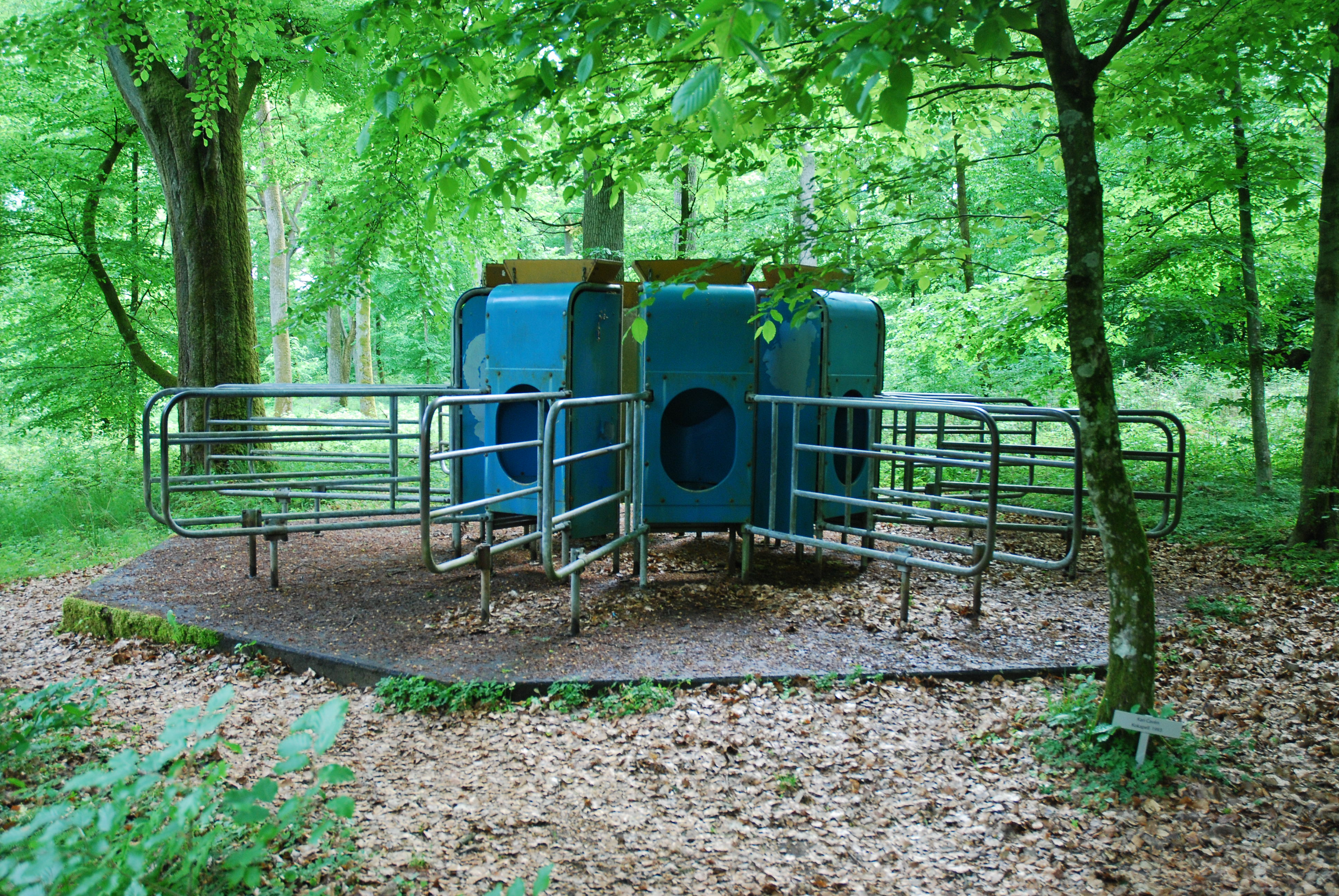
Kari Cavéns Cow Chapel

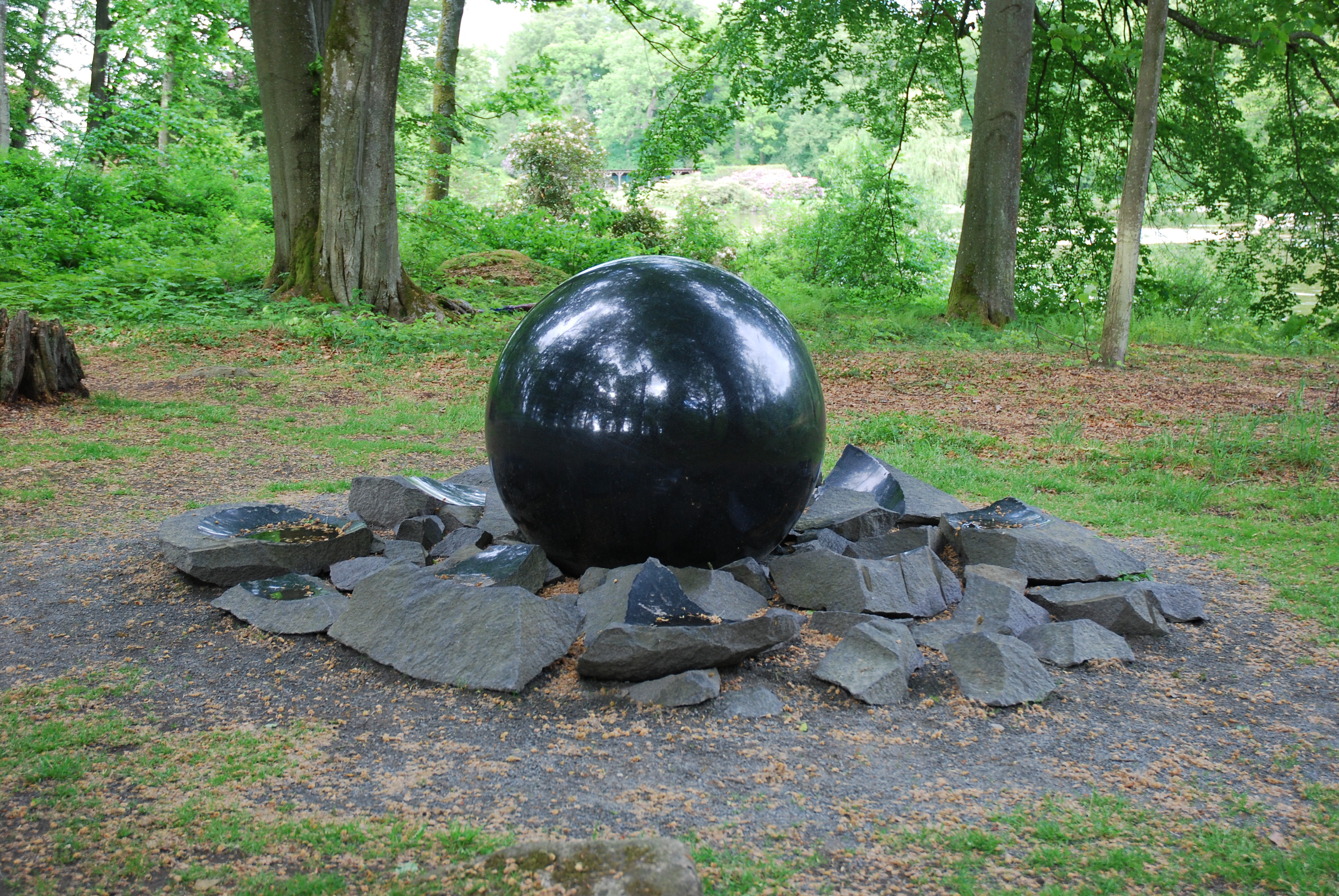
Pål Svenssons Sprungen ur (1996), diabas

- The little bridge (1988), diabas, by Stefan Wewerka
- Black line (1988), Raffael Rheinsberg
- Terra Maximus (1989), by Sissel Tolaas
- Gray Clam (1990), by Jene Highstein
- Pyramiden (1990), by Gunilla Bandolin
- Stigma (1991), by Gloria Friedmann
- Observatorium (1992), by Icelandic sculptor Rúrí (f 1951)
- Cow Chapel (1993), by Kari Cavén
- Solar Implode/Power House (1994), by Jeffrey Wisniewski
- Wanås (1994), by Per Kirkeby
- Food For Thought (1996), by Matthew McCaslin
- Sprungen Ur (1996), by Pål Svensson
- Parables (1998), by Allan McCollum
- The Hunt Chair for Animal Spirits (1998), by Marina Abramović
- Imposter (1999), by Roxy Paine
- A House for Edwin Denby (2000), by Robert Wilson
- Fideicommissum (2000), bronze, by Ann-Sofi Sidén
- Two Different Anamorphic Surfaces (2000), by Dan Graham
- Together and Apart (2001), by Antony Gormley
- Wanås Wall (2002), by Jenny Holzer
- Vertigo (2002), by Charlotte Gyllenhammar
- lignum (2002), by Ann Hamilton
- I Am Thinking About Myself – Wanås 2003 (2003), Marianne Lindberg De Geer
- 11 Minute Line (2004), by Maya Lin
- The eighth chimney (2007), tegel, by Jan Svenungsson
- Puruma (2025), by Atang Tshikare

== A selection of the permanent indoors exhibition ==
- Svindel (2002), by Charlotte Gyllenhammar
- lignum (2002), by Ann Hamilton
- Graf Spee (2007), by Jan Håfström together with Carl Michael von Hausswolff and Juan Pedro Fabra

== See also ==
- List of castles in Sweden

== Other sources ==
- Osterby, Anette (2000) Dan Graham : two different anamorphic surfaces : a new two way mirror pavilion in the Wanås Park, Sweden (The Wannas Foundation) ISBN 978-9197397209
- Johnsson, Pehr (1930) Vanås : göingebygdens största herresätepp (Malmö : Scania)
