= Cristos Gianakos =

American sculptor (born 1934)

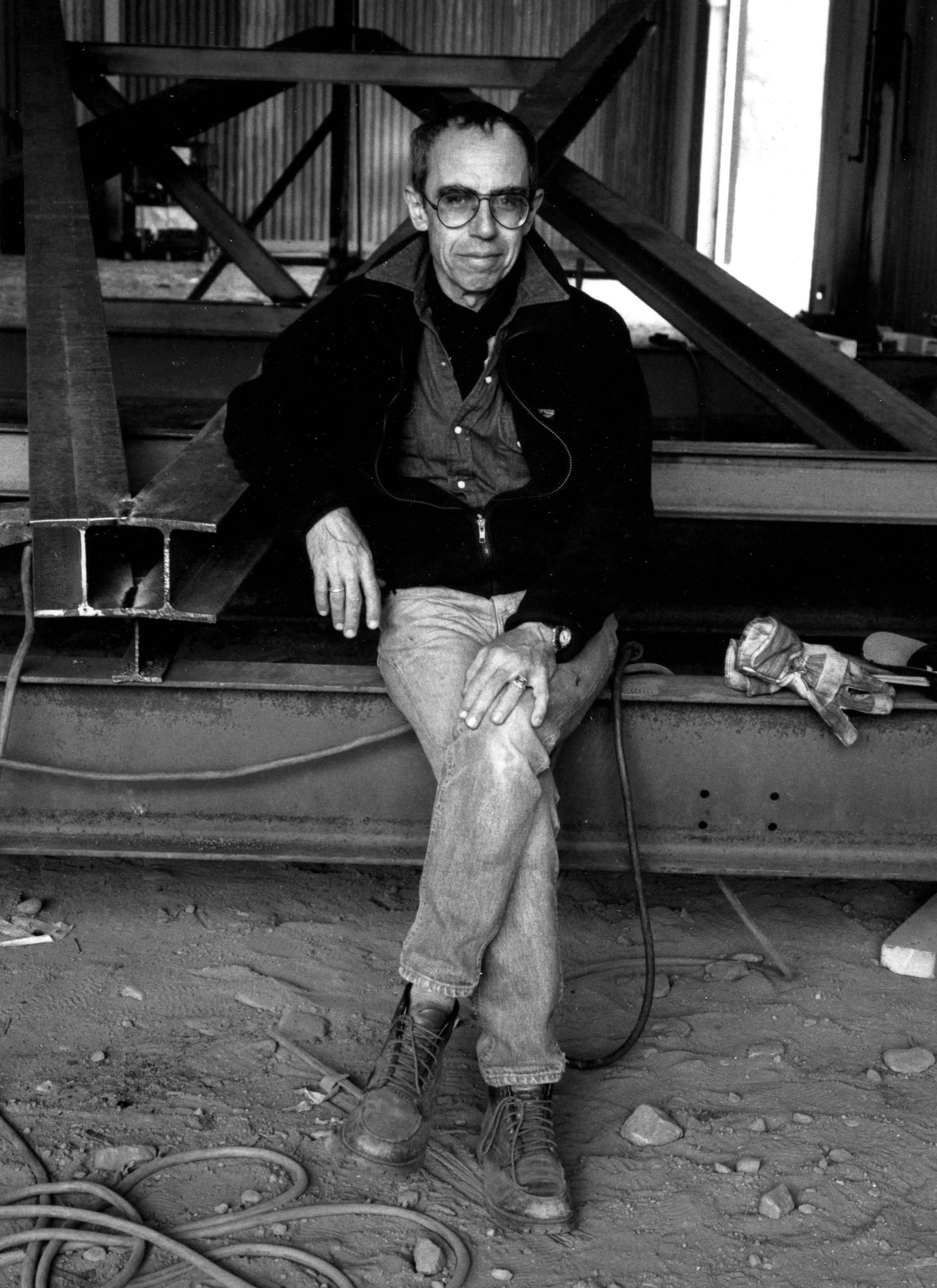
- Born: January 4, 1934 (age 92); New York City, U.S.
- Education: School of Visual Arts
- Movement: Postminimalism

Cristos Gianakos (born January 4, 1934) is an American postminimalist artist known for his large-scale ramp sculptures and installations. He lives and works in New York, where he has been teaching at the School of Visual Arts since 1963. He has been exhibiting and publishing as Cris Gianakos since 2002.

== Biography ==
Cristos Gianakos was born in the Washington Heights neighborhood of New York in 1934. He spent much of his early childhood in Greece, before returning to New York where he attended public school, studied Graphic Design at the School of Visual Arts, and ran an independent graphic design business from 1961 to 1971.

Gianakos began exhibiting his sculpture in the late 1960s. He was represented in the 1968 Whitney Annual at the Whitney Museum and the 1970 exhibition A Plastic Presence at the Jewish Museum in New York with works made of cast polyester resin.

In the mid-1970s, he began making ramp sculptures composed of raw wood. Artist Stephen Westfall describes: "Gianakos' ramps are sculpture with a planar front, or 'face.' ... The narrower planes slice through the environment with some of the partitioning power of Barnett Newman's zips."

In 1983, Gianakos began a series of two-dimensional works on large sheets of Mylar. New York Times critic William Zimmer writes:

Cristos Gianakos' point of departure is always plane geometry, but a geometry made solid in his sculpture by the use of construction materials such as wood and steel. His drawing on Mylar is likewise emphatic ... [and] commands attention because Mr. Gianakos, using acrylic, ink and graphite, has built up a surface so solid that it has a near-metallic sheen.

Yorghos Tzirtzilakis writes: "Gianakos works on the material dimension of sculpture (the choice of a single basic material each time seems to dominate) and attempts to redefine our understanding of space and the environment."

Influences such as Russian Constructivism, Suprematism, Minimalism, Constantin Brancusi, Franz Kline and Giorgio di Chirico have been noted in Gianakos' work.

Gianakos has presented solo exhibitions at the Nassau County Museum of Art (1979), the University Gallery at the University of Massachusetts at Amherst (1989), and the State Museum of Contemporary Art, Thessaloniki (2002).

Other notable exhibitions include Artist as Adversary at the Museum of Modern Art in New York (1971), Tit for Tatlin at the Alternative Museum in New York (1984), Walk on, sit down, go through at Socrates Sculpture Park in New York (1987), Large Scale Drawings from the Collection of Wynn Kramarsky at the Aldrich Museum of Contemporary Art (1989) in Ridgefield, Pratt Sculpture Park at Pratt Institute in New York (1999), and ron bladen, cris gianakos, max bill, hans josephsohn, beat zoderer, richard long, christoph haerle, richard serra, beatrice rossi, frédéric dedellay und bernhard tagwerker at the Max Bill Foundation in Zumikon, Switzerland (1999).

Gianakos has exhibited with other postminimalist sculptors including Eva Hesse, Nancy Graves, Richard Nonas, Alan Saret, and Richard Serra.

== Site-specific and public work (selected) ==
- White Powder Pieces, performances with white flour, Spring and Greene Streets, New York (1969) and Central Park Reservoir, New York (1972).
- Highbridge, 1977, wood, painted wood and bolts, dimensions variable, 55 Mercer Street, New York
- Ramp #4, 1978, wood, bolts and mild steel, 156 in x 384 in x 24 in (3.96 m x 9.75 m x 0.6 m), P.S. 1 Special Projects Room 209 Old Wing, Long Island City
- Ramp #7, 1978, wood, steel bolts, 192 in × 288 in × 24 in (4.88 m × 7.32 m × 0.61 m), Ward's Island, New York
- Rex, 1979, wood, plywood and hex bolts, 168 in × 264 in × 264 in (4.3 m × 6.7 m × 6.7 m), Nassau County Museum, Roslyn
- Mars, 1979, wood and hex bolts, 408 in × 492 in × 54 in (10.4 m × 12.5 m × 1.4 m), Nassau County Museum, Roslyn
- 120, 1979, wood, steel and hex bolts, 192 in × 1,440 in × 18 in (4.88 m × 36.58 m × 0.46 m), Nassau County Museum, Roslyn
- Dark Passage, 1980, wood, bolts, nails and paint, 295 in × 393 in × 12 in (7.49 m × 9.98 m × 0.30 m), Moderna Museet, Stockholm
- Cul de Sac, 1982, wood, plywood, bolts and screws, 144 in × 720 in × 96 in (3.7 m × 18.3 m × 2.4 m), Artpark, Lewiston
- Eclipse, 1982, wood, plywood, bolts and screws, 152 in × 132 in × 152 in (3.9 m × 3.4 m × 3.9 m), Chambers Street and West Broadway, New York, commissioned by the Public Art Fund
- Gemini, 1985, painted steel, 126 in × 126 in × 255 in (3.2 m × 3.2 m × 6.5 m), Ångbåtsbron, Malmö, commissioned by Skånes Konstförening (permanent)
- Styx, 1987, wood, plate steel and hex bolts, 84 in × 936 in × 162 in (2.1 m × 23.8 m × 4.1 m), Socrates Sculpture Park, New York
- Equinox, 1989, wood, glass, steel and hex bolts, 124 in × 120 in × 570 in (3.1 m × 3.0 m × 14.5 m), University Gallery, University of Massachusetts at Amherst
- Wanås Ramp, 1990, wood, plywood, bolts and nails, 104 in × 152 in × 96 in (2.6 m × 3.9 m × 2.4 m), Wanås Konst, Knislinge
- Orion, 1990, steel, 198 in × 144 in × 198 in (5.0 m × 3.7 m × 5.0 m), Wanås Konst, Knislinge (permanent)
- Cull de Sac II, 1992, 96 in × 936 in × 96 in (2.4 m × 23.8 m × 2.4 m), Hillwood Art Museum, Long Island University, Brookville
- Maroussi Ramp, 1995, steel, concrete and paint, 110 in × 24 in × 1,680 in (2.79 m × 0.61 m × 42.67 m), Emfietzoglou Gallery Museum, Athens (permanent)
- Gridlock, 1997, steel, 60 in × 252 in × 504 in (1.5 m × 6.4 m × 12.8 m), Alaca Imaret, Thessaloniki, commissioned by the Cultural Capital of Europe, Thessaloniki, 1997

== Collaborations ==
Gianakos designed the Artist's Reserved Rights and Transfer Sales Agreement, initiated by Seth Siegelaub in 1971. In the late 1960s, Gianakos participated in performances at Judson Dance Theater choreographed by Deborah Hay. He was invited by Eva Hesse to photograph her studio in 1970, shortly before her death. In the 1980s, he was a guest artist at the Robert Blackburn Printmaking Workshop.

== Collections ==
Gianakos' sculpture, painting, drawing, prints, photography and books are represented in collections worldwide including the Brooklyn Museum, New York, Cantor Arts Center, Stanford University, Gothenborg Museum of Art, Harvard Art Museums/Fogg Museum, Cambridge, Moderna Museet, Stockholm and Malmö, MOMus-Museum of Contemporary Art, Costakis Collection, Thessaloniki, Museum of Modern Art, New York, Skissernas Museum, Lund, Umedalens Skulpturpark, Umeå, Walker Art Center, Minneapolis, and Wanås Konst, Knislinge.

== Awards ==
Gianakos has been the recipient of numerous awards including grants from the Pollock-Krasner Foundation (2014) and the National Endowment for the Arts (1980).
