= Art and culture law =

Law relating Art and culture

Art and culture law (Art Law) covers legal aspects of the visual arts, antiquities, cultural heritage and the art market. This law includes the safeguarding, regulation, and facilitation of three artistic activities—creation, utilization and promotion. To protect their clients' interests, practitioners of art law navigate various legal areas: intellectual property, contract, constitutional, tort, tax, commercial, immigration, estates and wills, cultural property, international and others.

Art law primarily focuses on fine and visual arts, even though the term art encompasses a broad range of creative forms. This law safeguards the rights of parties who are involved with art, including artists, collectors, galleries and museums. It also fosters activities that are associated with art, including creation, preservation, and distribution. Beyond protecting individuals, art law plays a central role in supporting the broader artistic and cultural landscape.

== Key terms ==
A number of key terms are useful for understanding the field of art law:

- Antiquities—objects from antiquity. Christie's auction house characterizes antiquities as being "from the dawn of civilization to the Dark Ages, ranging from Western Europe to the Caspian Sea, embracing the cultures of Egypt, Greece, Rome and the Near East."
- Conservation—protection and restoration using "any methods that prove effective in keeping that property in as close to its original condition as possible for as long as possible."
- Fake or forgery—a non-authentic, imitation or counterfeit artwork.
- Intellectual property—the expression or creation of ideas (rather than the ideas themselves), such as art and literary works, designs, symbols, names, images, and inventions. The ownership of intellectual property can be legally protected by copyright, patents, trademarks, design rights, and database rights. (Related topics include moral rights and orphan works.)
- Restitution—the return of artworks, including those that were looted, stolen, or subject to Holocaust spoliation claims.
- Provenance—the full record of ownership, custody, and location of an artwork.

== History ==
Art law evolved significantly during the 20th century, with its influence apparent in municipal, state, and federal courts.

In the United States, the intersection of art and law is rooted in the US Constitution and its Copyright Clause, which encourages "the progress of science and useful arts" by securing exclusive rights for authors and inventors. Nevertheless, little headway was made in the realm of art law until former president William Howard Taft convinced the US Congress to establish the US Commission of Fine Arts.

Following World War II, a significant cultural boom shifted the focus of the art market from Europe to the United States. This shift brought increased attention to American culture, and American artists were no longer outsiders. Instead, they entered a new era, becoming integrated with the business environment. This new prominence highlighted the necessity of legal professionals concentrating on matters related to the arts.

Leading art laeswyers who have profoundly impacted the field include Judith Bresler, (Note: Judith Bressler was a co-author, with her husband, Ralph Lerner, of Art law : the guide for collectors, investors, dealers, and artists, which has been noted by Forbes to be the “bible of the industry”.) Norman Palmer, (Note: Norman Palmer has been deemed "the leading British lawyer dealing with cultural heritage issues.) and John Henry Merryman, (Note: John Henry Merryman is considered the founder of art law as a field of legal study in the United States.) among others.

== Areas of law ==
Legal areas of interest to art lawyers include the following:

=== Moral rights / droit moral ===
In the United States, artists' rights have typically been protected under copyright law or contract law. Increasingly, the moral rights of artists, those of "a spiritual, non-economic and personal nature that exist[s] independently of an artist's copyright in" their work, have been coming to the fore, on both federal and state levels. Statutorily, the moral rights of artists in the United States are poorly protected and narrowly enforced; some seemingly substantive claims are dismissed for any of three reasons: over procedural failure to state a claim, as res judicata, or on grounds of industrial design. Once an American artist dies, their moral rights immediately lapse. Numerous attempts have been made to introduce resale royalty rights in the United States; nevertheless, for the most part, artists' resale royalties are collected through self-negotiated contracts (similar to the agreement created by Seth Siegelaub and Robert Projansky in 1971). In reports from 1992 and 2013 (particularly on page 70 of the 2013 report), the US Copyright Office addresses the subject of resale royalties in general and makes reference to private agreements.

=== Intellectual property ===
Copyright is the protection of an individual's creations. A creator is given the exclusive right to reproduce, distribute, and display the work. Trademark protects the use of distinctive logos, symbols, and other identifying marks in art. Trademarks protect the owner from unauthorized use of their creations by other people. In addition, trademarks ensure that the public can easily identify the source of an artwork.

=== Contract ===
Contracts typically govern the terms and transfer of ownership of artworks. Contracts establish obligations between the artist, the gallery, and the collector.

=== Constitutional ===
The jurisdiction of the US Supreme Court extends to multiple areas:

- the First Amendment to the US Constitution
- freedom of expression
- oversight of Congressional power under Article 1, Section 8, of the US Constitusion
- conflicting lower court rulings on copyrightable subject matter
- the Foreign Sovereign Immunity Act

Art law cases with the Supreme Court have unique sociopolitical dimensions—since art law impacts a range of legal topics from free speech to art restitution.

=== Tort ===
Tort law applies in cases of fraud or negligence in the art market. For example, if an auction house sold a work of art knowing that it was inauthentic, or without authenticating the work, this would be a case of forgery.

=== Tax ===
The US tax code provides incentives for collectors, galleries, and museums. These incentives include tax deductions for charitable contributions of art. In addition, there are special tax codes related to the import and export of art.

=== Commercial ===
Commercial art law is a specialized area of legal practice that is tailored to the unique needs of artists and collectors in the realm of business and creative assets. Artists and collectors often require tailored legal support for managing their estates, which may comprise valuable works of art. Within the purview of commercial art law, individuals can appoint art executors through their will and testament, empowering experts with appropriate knowledge to effectively handle and maintain their artistic assets according to their wishes. Furthermore, commercial art law addresses the intricacies of copyright, treating it as a distinct property interest that can be conveyed independently from the artwork itself; this ensures that the creative and financial rights of artists and collectors are safeguarded. This legal domain plays a crucial role in preserving and protecting the interests of people engaged with the art world, bridging the gap between artistic expression and commerce.

=== Immigration ===
The O-1A visa is a temporary worker visa for individuals with exceptional abilities or achievements in fields such as the sciences, arts, education, business, or athletics, as supported by sustained national or international recognition. The related O-1B visa is for individuals working in the film or television production industry, as supported by a proven history of remarkable accomplishment. Additionally, the visa applicant must be entering the United States to engage in work or performance related to their exceptional talents. These visas are initially granted for up to three years, and they can be extended in one-year increments if the same work continues.

=== Estates, trusts, and wills ===
Some art lawyers work to prepare estates for artists and art collectors. In this area, artists often have unique requirements. For example, an artist or collector may designate an art executor in their will and testament, with a focus on overseeing the portion of the estate that comprises artworks. Ideally, this art executor would possess the specialized expertise needed to effectively preserve or handle the artwork as stipulated in the will. Additionally, as a distinct property interest, copyright can be addressed in a will and transferred like any other property right, separately from the actual artwork.

=== Cultural property ===
Cultural property protection encompasses a set of rules and regulations designed to safeguard cultural heritage in its various forms, ensuring its preservation and preventing damage, destruction, theft, embezzlement, or any illicit handling. This protection extends to a range of cultural assets, including "monument protection" for immovable cultural property, such as historical monuments, notable architecture, and similar structures. These protections are granted to constructions, buildings, ruins, fortresses, gardens, and more. The rules and regulations governing cultural property protection cover multiple aspects, including access to protection, measures for preventing and legally addressing theft, archaeological site excavation, and the looting or destruction of both natural and man-made cultural sites worldwide. Concurrently, cultural property protection also involves addressing questions related to equitable access to shared cultural heritage. (For example, the UNESCO 1970 Convention is an international treaty to combat illegal trade in cultural items.)

=== International ===
International art law is a specialized field that pertains to the intricate and distinctive requirements of the global art community. The field addresses the legal needs of artists, collectors, and cultural institutions operating on an international scale. Much like in commercial art law, practitioners of international art law help individuals to navigate the complexities of managing estates containing valuable artworks. Additionally, international art law addresses the complexities of cross-border art transactions, ensuring that legal frameworks and agreements are established to facilitate the international movement of artworks, while also preserving the cultural and financial interests of the parties involved. This legal discipline serves as a vital bridge between artistic expression and the complex, multifaceted world of international art trade and preservation.

== Important legal cases ==
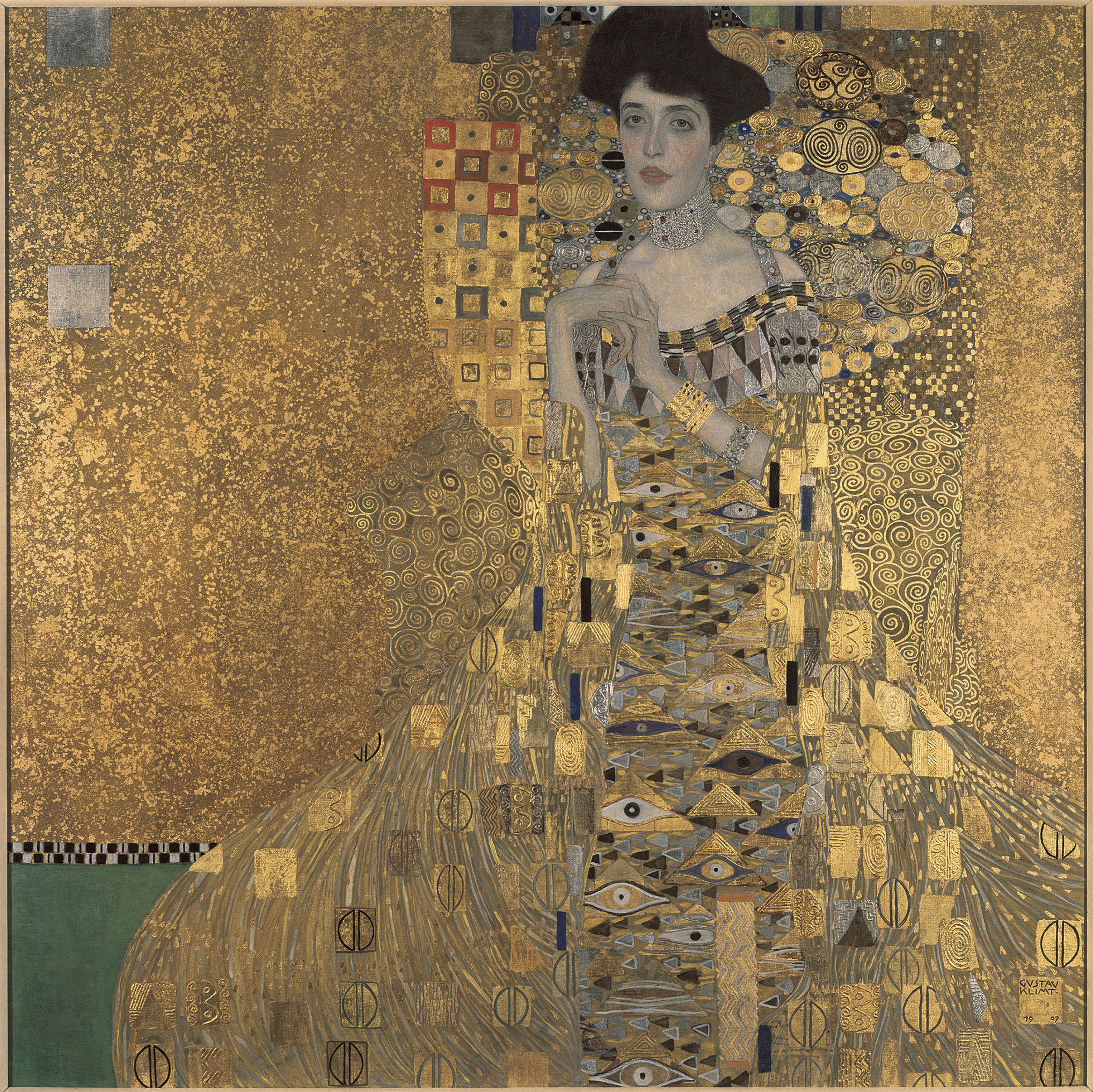
Portrait of Adele Bloch-Bauer I, a painting by Gustav Klimt, which was stolen in 1941 and later recovered through legal action

Between the years 1722 and 2023, a series of cases in art law have helped to define the field. These cases fall into two groups—general art law or cultural heritage.

=== General art law ===
- 1722: Armory v. Delamirie, EWHC J94,1 Strange 505, 93 Eng. Rep. 664
  - Facts: Paul Delamirie, the defendant, was a producer of silverworks in the eighteenth century. Armory was a window sweeper's child. Armory found a jewel and took the jewel to Delamirie's shop. An apprentice at the shop offered to pay Armory money for the jewel, but he then removed the stone without Armory's authorization.
  - Issue: The issue was whether either party had any property rights to the jewel.
  - Holding: The true owner of the jewel was not relevant, as the Court was only concerned with who had a better right to possession. The priority of rights to possession means the following: a finder has better title to property that they find than any person except the true owner; thus Armory had full rights to the jewel.
  - Judgment: The Court ruled in favour of Armory. Since the jewel was not produced in evidence at the trial, Armory was awarded the maximum value possible for a jewel of that form.
- 1883: Tutton v. Viti (1883), 108 U.S. 312
  - Facts: This case was between an artist and the American government in 1928. A bronze sculpture titled "Bird in Space" was being shipped for an exhibition. A customs official classified the bronze as a piece of metal, not an artwork, so a 40% duty was imposed.
  - Issue: The US Customs Court needed to determine whether a bronze sculpture by Constantin Brancusi was a work of art or an ordinary piece of polished bronze.
  - Holding: The sculpture was not strictly representational. The court reasoned that the object was used only for ornamental purposes.
- 1884: Burrow-Giles Lithographic Co. v. Sarony, 111 U.S. 53
  - Holding: the Supreme Court upheld Congressional expansion of copyright protection to photography.
- 1992: Rogers v. Koons, 960 F.2d 301
  - Facts: The case involved an artist, Jeff Koons, who created a sculpture titled "String of Puppies". Koons based his sculpture on a photograph taken by Art Rogers, who took a black-and-white photo of a man and a woman with their arms full of puppies. Koons replicated the photograph's composition, including the arrangement of the puppies and the pose of the man and woman. Koons stated that the sculpture "must be just like [the] photo".
  - Issue: The central question was whether Koons' replication of Rogers' photograph constituted copyright infringement, considering that Koons claimed his work was a parody.
  - Judgment: The court ruled in favor of Art Rogers, stating that Koons' use of the photograph did not qualify as a protected parody—a kind of fair use—and was therefore copyright infringement. The court distinguished between permissible parody, which comments on or criticizes the original work, and mere commercial replication for profit. Since Koons didn't transform the original work for a different purpose, but rather reproduced it for commercial gain, the court found him liable for copyright infringement. The case highlights the importance of distinguishing between permissible parody and unauthorized replication with regards to copyright infringement in the realm of artistic works. The court writes "the case turns upon Rogers' past conduct or present intention as much as it does upon the existence of a recognized market for new versions or new uses of the photograph, which unauthorized use clearly undermines".
- 1994: Campbell v. Acuff-Rose Music, Inc., 510 U.S. 569
  - Facts: The case involved the hip-hop group 2 Live Crew, who created a parody of the song "Oh, Pretty Woman" by Roy Orbison. 2 Live Crew's version, titled "Pretty Woman," transformed the original romantic ballad into a humorous commentary on the fair use of copyrighted material.
  - Issue: The main question was whether 2 Live Crew's parody qualified as fair use under copyright law, exempting it from copyright infringement.
  - Judgment: The Supreme Court ruled in favor of 2 Live Crew, holding that their parody was a transformative work and constituted fair use. The decision emphasized the importance of transformative use in determining fair use, and it stated that a work can be transformative even if it merely comments on or criticizes the original. The ruling had a significant impact on the understanding of fair use in the context of parody, providing greater protection for artists engaging in transformative and creative works. It clarified and expanded the concept of fair use, particularly in the context of parody, contributing to the legal framework for balancing copyright protection and freedom of expression.
- 2004: Republic of Austria v. Altmann, 541 U.S. 677
  - Holding: Maria Altmann conducted a civil action against Austria in an American federal district court for recovery of five paintings by Gustav Klimt, which were stolen by the Nazis from her relatives and then housed in an Austrian government museum.
- 2006: Blanch v. Koons, 467 F.3d 244
  - Facts: In the case of Andrea Blanch v. Jeff Koons, photographer Andrea Blanch sued artist Jeff Koons for copyright infringement. Koons had used one of Blanch's photographs as the basis for a painting, but he made several alterations to it, which included removing background elements, changing the orientation of the legs, and adding details. Koons argued that his use of the photograph was a commentary on how mass media represents basic human desires. The district court ruled in Koons's favor, finding that his appropriation of Blanch's photograph was fair use. Blanch appealed the decision to a higher court.
  - Issue: Can a work be considered transformative if it introduces novel elements and serves an additional purpose or has a distinct nature, thereby modifying the original work to convey fresh expression, significance, or communication?
  - Judgment: In determining fair use, the court considers four factors. The most important factor is transformation, meaning the extent to which the new work adds new meaning or purpose to the original. Jeff Koons's use of Andrea Blanch's photo is transformative, as it satirizes fashion magazines, offering a fresh perspective. Other factors, such as the nature of the original work and the amount used, support Koons. Blanch testified that Koons's use had no negative impact on her career. Consequently, the court affirms the fair use of Blanch's photo by Koons.
- 2009: US. v. Portrait of Wally, 663 F. Supp. 2d 232 (S.D.N.Y. 2009)
  - Facts: In the case of "Wally," the dispute revolved around the rightful ownership of a painting known as "the Wally", by the painter Egon Schiele. This artwork had initially belonged to a Jewish art collector, but it was forcibly acquired by a Nazi dealer named Friedrich Welz.
  - Issue: The issue was whether collector Rudolf Leopold knew that "Wally" had been stolen when the museum imported it into the United States for exhibition at MOMA.
- 2013: Cariou v. Prince, 714 F.3d 694
  - Facts: Photographer Patrick Cariou published a book of Jamaican photographs. Artist Richard Prince used Cariou's photos in his own art, leading to a copyright infringement lawsuit. The court initially ruled against Prince, stating his use didn't qualify as fair use and harmed Cariou's market. Prince appealed the decision.
  - Judgment: Non-infringing fair uses involve transformative works that introduce fresh elements and alter the character, purpose, and message of the original copyrighted work.
- 2020: Castillo et al. v. G&M Realty L.P. et al, 950 F.3d 155
  - Facts: The case involves the 5Pointz site in Queens, New York, known for its aerosol art on the facades of several buildings. Gerald Wolkoff, the owner of the site, decided to demolish it to build an apartment complex and ordered the whitewashing of the art, destroying it. Artists sued Wolkoff under the Visual Artists' Rights Act (VARA), claiming that he violated their rights by destroying works of "recognized stature."
  - Issue: The main question was whether even temporary works of aerosol art could be protected under VARA and if Wolkoff willfully violated VARA by destroying them. The court also considered the argument that the temporary nature of the art should exempt it from VARA protection.
  - Judgment: The United States District Court for the Eastern District of New York ruled that some works on 5Pointz were of "recognized stature," and that Wolkoff willfully violated VARA by destroying them. The court declined actual damages, but it awarded the maximum statutory damages of $6.75 million to sanction Wolkoff's conduct and uphold VARA's policies. The Second Circuit Court of Appeals upheld the judgment, emphasizing that the temporary nature of aerosol art did not exempt it from VARA protection. The court highlighted examples of temporary works that achieved recognized stature, rejecting the argument that such works should be excluded from VARA. The case reinforced the principle that even temporary works of art, like aerosol art at 5Pointz, can enjoy protection under VARA. The court upheld the finding that Wolkoff willfully violated VARA by destroying works of recognized stature, affirming the lower court's decision and award of damages.
- 2023: Andy Warhol Foundation for the Visual Arts, Inc. v. Goldsmith, 598 U.S. 508
  - Facts: Artist Andy Warhol produced a collection of silkscreen prints and pencil drawings known as the Prince Series, which were based on a copyrighted 1981 photo of the musician Prince taken by film director Lynn Goldsmith. While Warhol made some artistic alterations to Goldsmith's original photo, the resulting works were still clearly connected to the original image. Goldsmith filed a copyright infringement lawsuit against the Andy Warhol Foundation, which inherited Warhol's copyright in the Prince Series. The Foundation defended itself by claiming fair use. The district court ruled in favor of the Foundation, stating that Warhol had "transformed" the original photo by giving it a new "meaning and message." However, the U.S. Court of Appeals for the Second Circuit disagreed, arguing that because the Prince Series retained a recognizable connection to the original, it did not undergo a transformative change, and it therefore did not qualify as fair use.
  - Issue: What is the proper test for whether a work is "transformative" under the first factor of the Copyright Act's fair use doctrine?
  - Holding: The "purpose and character" of the Andy Warhol Foundation's (AWF's) particular commercial use of Lynn Goldsmith's photograph—17 U.S.C. § 107(1)—does not favor AWF's "fair use" defense to copyright infringement.

=== Cultural heritage ===
- 1966: Menzel v. List 49, Misc. 2d 300 (N.Y. Sup. Ct. 1966)
  - Facts: Erna Menzel and her husband fled Belgium during the German invasion in 1940, leaving behind a painting by Marc Chagall. The painting was later sold to Klaus Perls and his wife by a Parisian gallery in 1955, who then sold it to Albert List the same year. In 1962, Menzel discovered the painting's location, demanded its return from List, and brought a replevin action when List refused. List impleaded the Perlses, claiming breach of implied warranty of title. The jury ruled in Menzel's favor, ordering the painting's return. List was awarded damages, initially set at $22,500. The Perlses appealed, arguing for a reduction in damages.
  - Issue: The central question is whether the general rule of contract damages applies; this rule aims to place the injured party in the position that they would be in if the contract were performed.
  - Judgement: Yes—the general rule stands. In cases of breach of contract, the injured party is typically entitled to expectation damages, restoring them to the position they would be in if the contract were fulfilled. New York statutes imply a warranty of title in a sale contract, ensuring the seller's right to sell and the buyer's right to possess the goods against lawful claims. The measure of damages for breach of warranty is the loss resulting directly and naturally from the breach. The Perlses argued that damages should be limited to the purchase price paid by List, but the court rejected this argument. Such a limitation would only result in rescission and restitution, leaving List in a position as if the contract had never happened. The court asserted that the proper measure is expectation damages, putting List in the position he would be in if the contract were performed. If the warranty had been fulfilled, List would still have the painting and could sell it for its present value. The Perlses' argument about potential liability for innocent sellers was dismissed, as the Perlses could have investigated the painting's title before the sale. The appellate division's order on damages was reversed, reinstating the judgment awarding List the present value of the painting.
- 1997: United States v. An Antique Platter of Gold, known as a Gold Phiale Mesomphalos, 991 F. Supp. 222
  - Facts: William Veres, a European art dealer, sold an ancient gold plate (a phiale) to New York-based art dealer Robert Haber on behalf of the ultimate purchaser, American businessman Michael Steinhardt. Haber represented the phiale as being from Switzerland with a value of $250,000 on customs entry forms, when it was actually from Italy and valued at $1 million. The Italian government sought U.S. assistance in locating the phiale, leading to its seizure and forfeiture under an American statute prohibiting importation through false statements. Steinhardt, claiming ownership, contested the forfeiture. The district court granted summary judgment in favor of the US, and Steinhardt appealed, arguing that the false statements were not material.
  - Issue: Is a false statement made to customs officials material if it would naturally tend to influence these officials?
  - Judgement: The rule establishes that a false statement made to customs officials is material if it would naturally tend to influence them. Importation through a false statement is not the same as importation because of a false statement. Forfeiture of the imported item under the relevant statute requires the false statement to be integral to the importation process, though not necessarily the deciding factor. If it can be demonstrated that a false statement would be significant to a reasonable customs official, materiality is established.
- 2002: United States v. Schultz, 178 F. Supp. 2d 445 (S.D.N.Y. 2002)
  - Facts: This case involves art dealer Frederick Schultz, who was charged with conspiracy to possess stolen foreign goods in the United States, specifically ancient Egyptian artifacts. The charge was based on violating 18 U.S.C. § 2315. Schultz moved to dismiss, arguing that the indictment assumed guilt under Egyptian Law 117, asserting that Law 117 was merely a regulation and not a criminal offense. Law 117 declared all Egyptian historical artifacts as state property.
  - Issue: The issue is whether the American charge presupposed a crime under Egyptian law.
  - Judgement: The court held that the American charge did not improperly presuppose a crime under Egyptian law. Contrary to Schultz's claim, Law 117 was more than a regulation; it granted the state extensive property rights, including title, possession, and the right to transfer. The court determined that violating Law 117 amounted to stealing Egyptian artifacts, aligning with the American law under section 2315. Essentially, the violation of Law 117 constituted theft, and the American indictment did not assume an underlying crime. Therefore, Schultz's motion to dismiss was denied.

== Theory ==
John Henry Merryman (1920–2013), an American legal scholar, was a pioneering figure in the development of cultural and artistic property law as a distinct field of legal study. In his view, there are two paradigms through which art and cultural law can be defined. The first paradigm is the object's being independent of its national ties, and therefore deriving significance and meaning from the historical or archaeological interest that is generated by human culture. This idea is legally bolstered by UNESCO's definition of cultural objects, which is a similar definition of significant objects that attract interest. The second paradigm inextricably ties cultural objects to their national heritage, which in turn legitimizes efforts for their repatriation. (Some examples include the Elgin marbles, the Gweagal shield, and the Easter island heads.)

== Programs, organizations and libraries ==
Many organizations and libraries collect and catalogue publications on art and cultural heritage. Some programs and organizations in the field of art law are as follows:

Programs

- Sotheby's Institute of Art
- Christie's Education
- Columbia Law School
- New York University School of Law
- Fordham University School of Law
- DePaul College of Law
- New York Law School
- Brooklyn Law School
- University of Miami Law School

Organizations

- Center for Art Law
- Volunteer Lawyers for the Arts
- Institute for Art and Law (IK)
- Centre Art-Droit (Geneva, Switzerland)

== Books and media ==
Art law has been featured in a number of books and media. Some examples are given below.

=== Books ===
- Art Law Treatise
- Marymount—textbook

=== Documentary films ===
- The Art of the Steal (2009)—This documentary covers the creation, history, and prolonged struggle for control of the world's most important and valuable collection of Post-Impressionist and early modern art.
- Portrait of Wally (2012)—This film tells the story of Egon Schiele's painting Portrait of Wally, which was looted during the Nazi era and ultimately returned to its rightful home. The painting was subject to post-war human error, and it later became the focus of a thirteen-year court battle.
- Art of the Heist: The Lady In Gold (2008)—This film tells the story of the Portrait of Adele Bloch-Bauer and five other works by Gustav Klimt; their route through the complicated events of the twentieth century; and an outstanding legal battle.
- Brandpunt Special: De Van Gogh-roof (2017)—In 2002, a professional criminal stole two unique masterpieces from the Van Gogh Museum in Amsterdam. He was later caught and convicted, and the works were recovered. This documentary is the detailed confession of that burglar.
- The Elgin Marbles (2004)—This documentary explores the removal of the Elgin Marbles from the Parthenon temple in Athens, and a centuries-long legal battle between Greece and the United Kingdom.

=== Drama films ===
- L'Antiquaire (2015)—This French movie describes a young woman's quest to recover the collection of paintings stolen from her Jewish family during World War II.
- Woman in Gold (2015)—The feature film tells the story of Maria Altmann, an eventual owner of Adele Bloch-Bauer's portrait and five other works by Gustav Klimt.

=== Podcasts ===
- The Art Law Podcast—This podcasts hosts discussions on topics at the intersection of art and law, with art lawyers Steve Schindler and Katie Wilson-Milne, in addition to their guests.
- Warfare of Art & Law—The goal of the podcast is to start conversations about issues centered on the arts, the law, and culture.

=== Television ===
- Fake or Fortune?—This television series on BBC One delves into provenance research and attribution issues, offering detailed reflection and discussion.
