= Umedalen skulpturpark =

Sculpture garden in Umeå, Sweden

Coordinates: 63°50′20.3″N 20°09′32.9″E

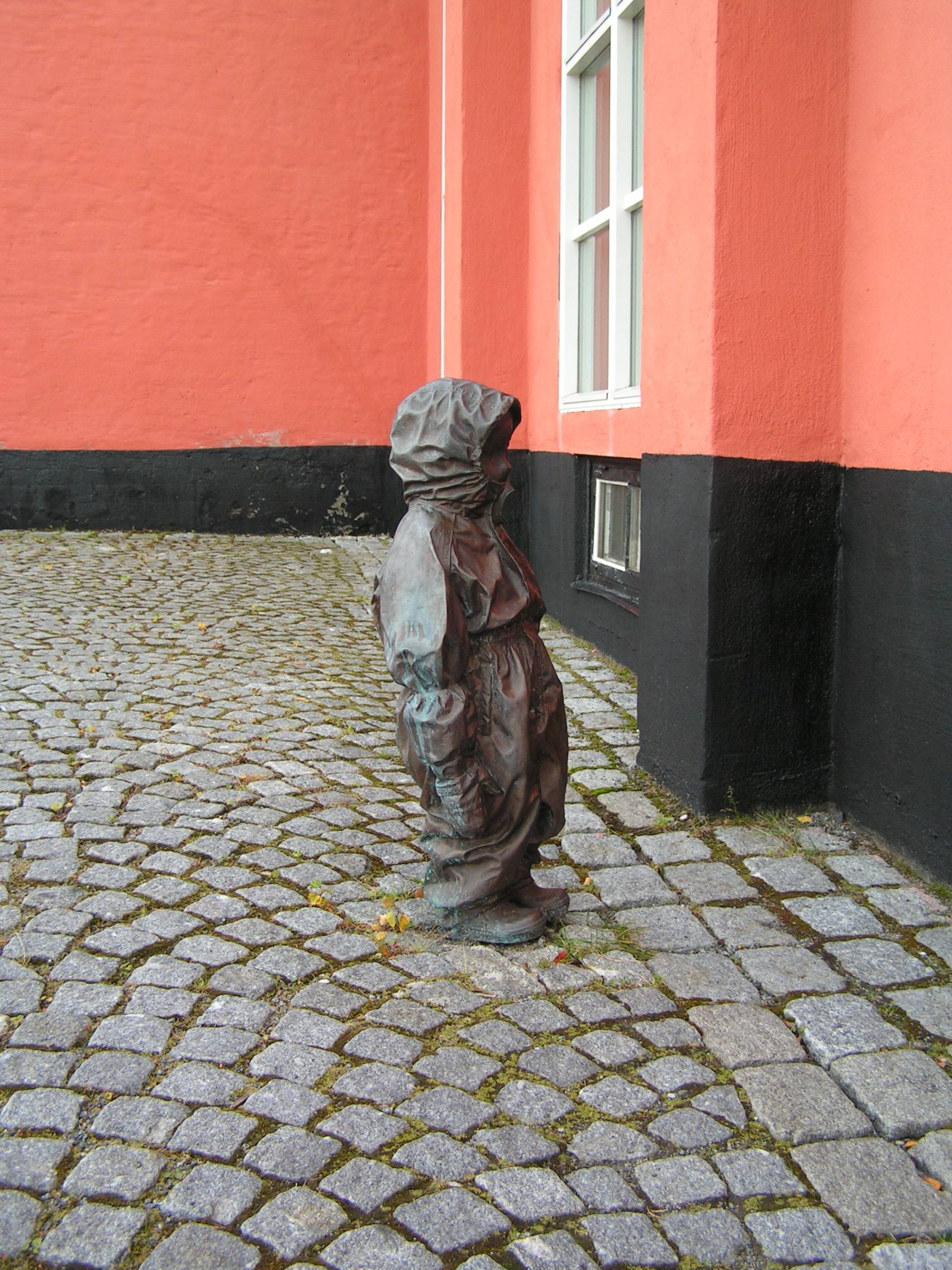
Out by Charlotte Gyllenhammar

Umedalen skulpturpark is an art exhibition and a sculpture garden in Umeå in Sweden.

== History ==
An art exhibition was arranged in Umedalen for the first time in 1994 and it is now a permanent exhibition in a sculpture garden at the previous Umedalen hospital precinct.

The property company Balticgruppen (The Baltic Group), together with Art Gallery Galleri Sandström Andersson, in 1987 bought the uncommissioned psychiatric hospital Umedalen, around 20 stone houses in a park, by the Västerbotten County Council. Sweden's largest art gallery has been built around the historic buildings that were previously used as the hospital. Balticgruppen has purchased 44 sculptures, which now form the permanent exhibition in the sculpture park.

== Permanently exhibited sculptures ==
- Untitled, granite, 2001, by Bård Breivik
- Black, Grey, Broken Sky and Palest Blue, 2010, ceramic tiles and steel, by Astrid Sylwan
- Forest Hill, 1997, plastic pipes, concrete, by Buky Schwartz
- The most lonesome story ever told, 1998, by Jonas Kjellgren
- Heart of trees, 2007, bronze and trees, by Jaume Plensa
- Nosotros, 2008, painted steel by Jaume Plensa
- Emergency station (Räddningsplats), 2008, textile, grass, sun flower seeds, by Gunilla Samberg
- Untitled, 1998, painted bronze, by Roland Persson
- Hardback, 2000, concrete, by Nina Saunders
- Mor och Barn (Mother and child), 1958, bronze, by David Wretling
- Still Running 1990-93, cast iron, by Antony Gormley
- Another Time VIII, 2007, cast iron, by Antony Gormley
- Pillar of light, 1991, sandstone, by Anish Kapoor
- 55 meter long double-line of double-boulders, 1997, boulders, by Richard Nonas
- Vegetation Room VII, 2000, resin and bronze powder panels, by Cristina Iglesias
- Untitled, 1994, galvanized bathtubs, by Carina Gunnars
- Arch, 1995, granite, by Claes Hake
- Eye Benches II, 1996–97, black granite from Zimbabwe, by Louise Bourgeois
- Social Meeting, 1997, wooden skis, by Raffael Reinsberg
- Untitled (1998), painted bronze, by Roland Persson
- She leaves the lights on and forgets the room 1998, steel and sanitary porcelain, by Meta Isaeus-Berlin
- Stevensson (Early Forms), bronze, 1999, by Tony Cragg
- Alliansring (Wedding ring), 2000, bronze, by Anna Renström
- Skogsdunge (Forest grove), 2002, flag poles, by Kari Cavén
- Untitled, 2002, stainless steel, by Anne-Karin Furunes
- Homestead, 2004, wood, concrete, by Clay Ketter
- Dysfunctional Outdoor Gym, 2004, wood, metal and ropes, by Torgny Nilsson
- Den sjuka flickan (The sick girl), 2004, steel, by Jacob Dahlgren
- Flip, 2006, painted steel, by Mats Bergquist
- Tillåtet (Allowed), 1990-2006, vinyl and aluminium, by Mikael Richter
- Concrete and leaves, 1996, concrete, by Miroslaw Balka
- Koma-Amok, 1997, steel, by Bigert & Bergström
- Umea Prototype, 1999-2000, corten steel with silver birch trees, by Serge Spitzer
- Trajan's Shadow, 2001, bronze, oil paint, steel, by Sean Henry
- Beam Walk, 1996, steel, by Cristos Gianakos
- Out, 2004, bronze, by Charlotte Gyllenhammar
- Kastenhaus 1166, 2000, metal, wood, PVC, by Winter & Hörbelt

== Gallery ==
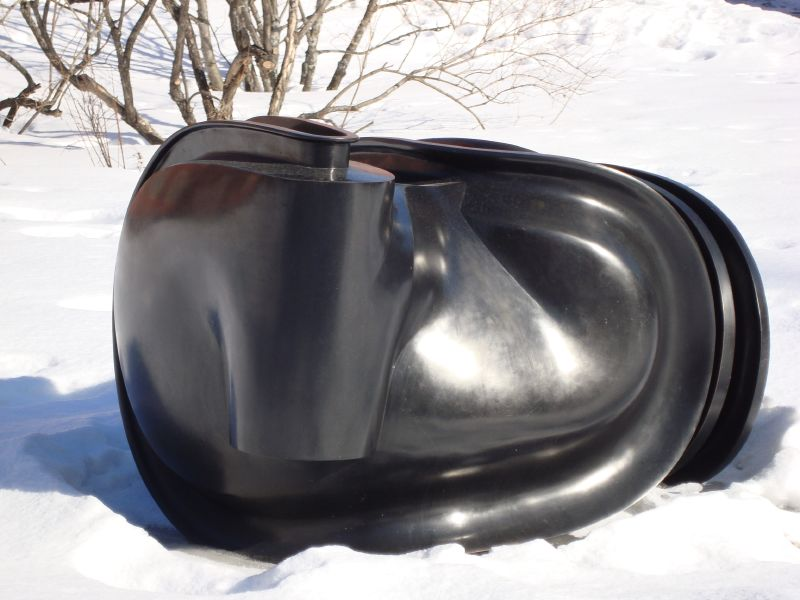
Early Forms by Tony Cragg

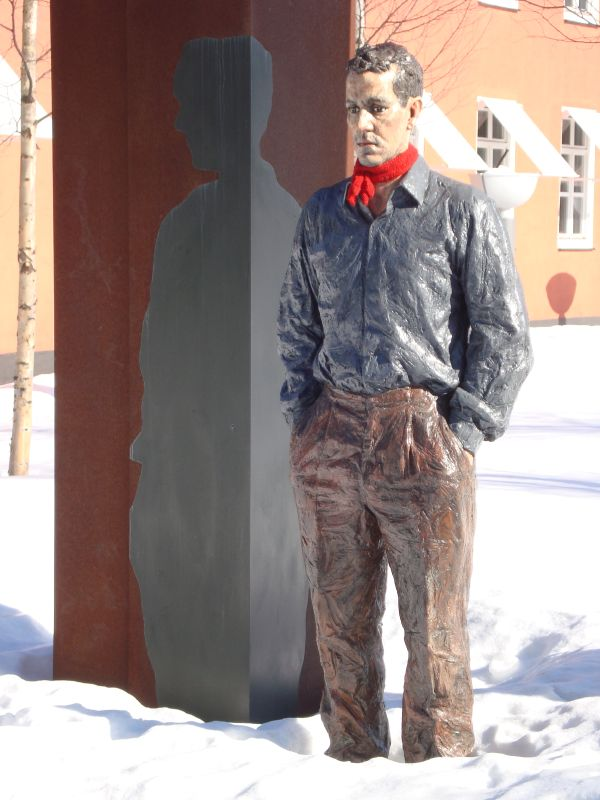
Trajan's Shadow by Sean Henry

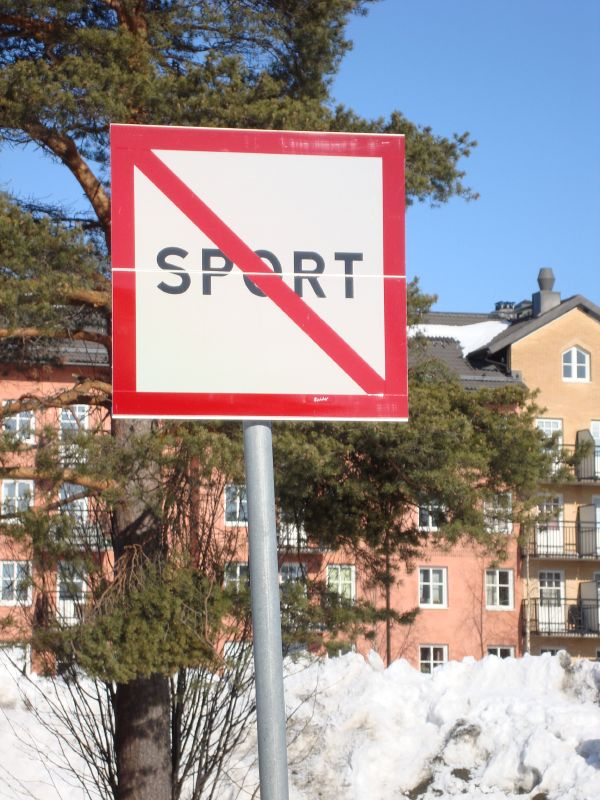
Tillåtet by Mikael Richter

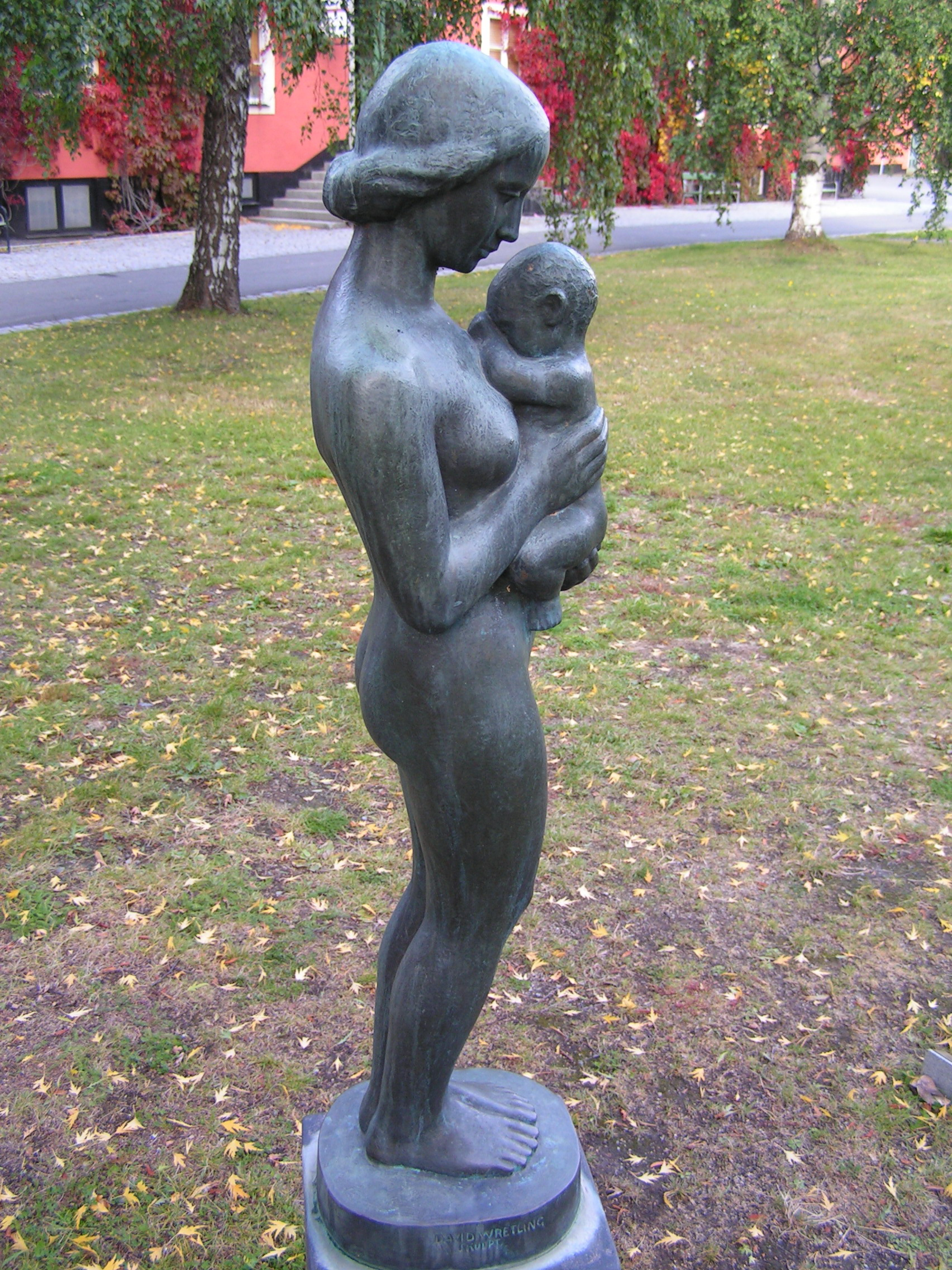
Mor och Barn by David Wretling

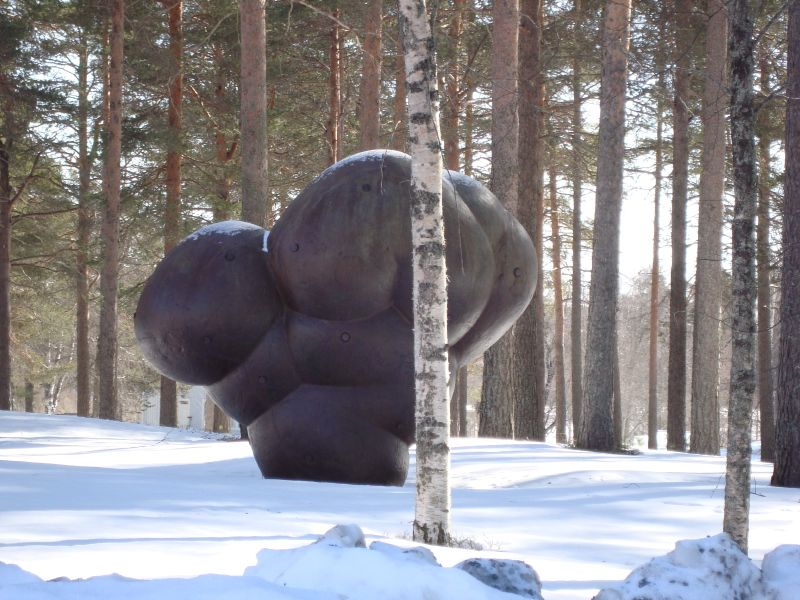
Still Running by Antony Gormley

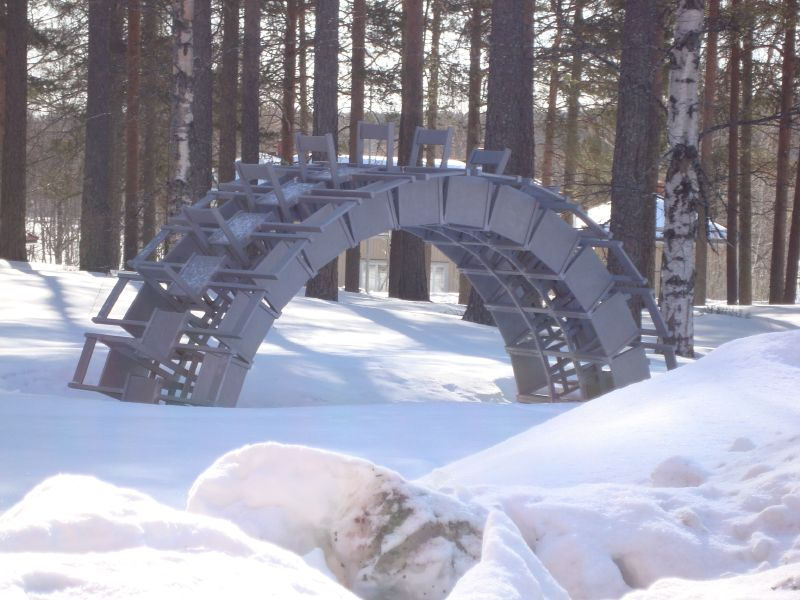
Klassresa av Kari Cavén

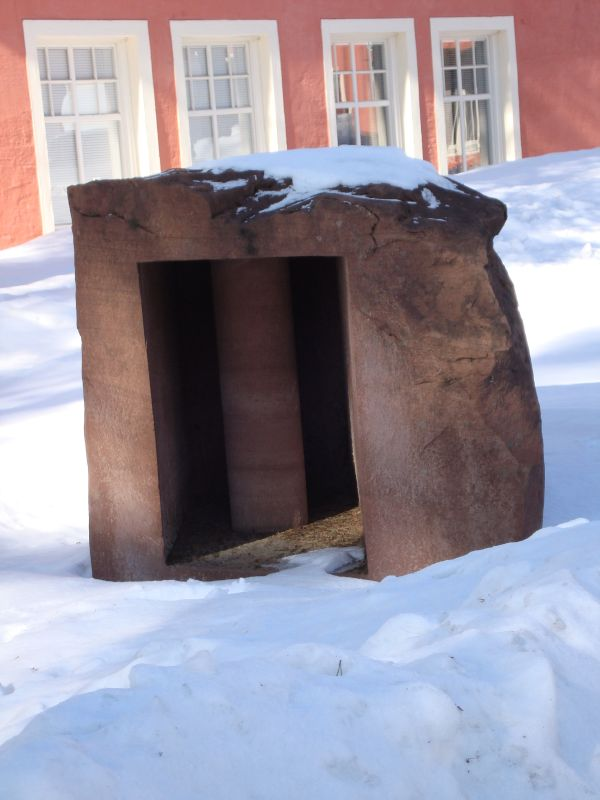
Pillar of light, 1991, by Anish Kapoor
