= Ann-Sofi Sidén =

Swedish artist

- Born: April 2, 1962 (age 63); Stockholm, Sweden
- Education: Hochschule der Künste, Berlin, Royal University College of Fine Arts, Stockholm
- Known for: visual art, sculpture, performance
- Notable work: Curtain Callers (2011); My Country (2010); In Passing (2007), 3 MPH (2003), Warte Mal! (1999), Who Told The Chambermaid? (1998), QM, I Think I Call Her QM (1997)
- Website: annsofisiden.com

Ann-Sofi Sidén is a contemporary Swedish artist. She had a traditional education and started out as a painter. She expanded into other mediums, including video, film, performance and sculpture. Sidén's styles and themes do not fit easy categorization.

== The Queen of Mud ==
Sidén's early works center around a fictional character of her own creation, the "Queen of Mud", or QM. The creature is played by Sidén herself, and is the subject of numerous videos and films made in the late 1980s and early 1990s. The most notable aspects of the character are that she is naked, and covered in mud. In 1989, she walked into NK, an exclusive department store in central Stockholm. The character went to the perfume counter and tested a Chanel perfume before being escorted out of the building by security guards. The visit made headlines in the Stockholm evening press, and led to an appearance by Sidén on a Swedish TV talk show, Ikväll, hosted by Robert Aschberg.

QM's public appearances continued in 1992 when she walked through the Stockholm Art Fair. Under the guise of looking for art to take with her on her imminent space travel, she engaged several gallerists in conversation, one of whom assisted in reapplying mud on her body.

The QM character played a lead-role in Sidén's 1997 film, QM, I Think I Call Her QM.

The QM character has her own museum, The QM Museum (2004), Sidén's 17-channel mixed media installation. The digital archive that is part of the museum contains over 4,000 articles, consisting of drawings, poems, videos, films, and sculptures that Sidén made about QM during her career.

== It's By Confining One's Neighbor... ==
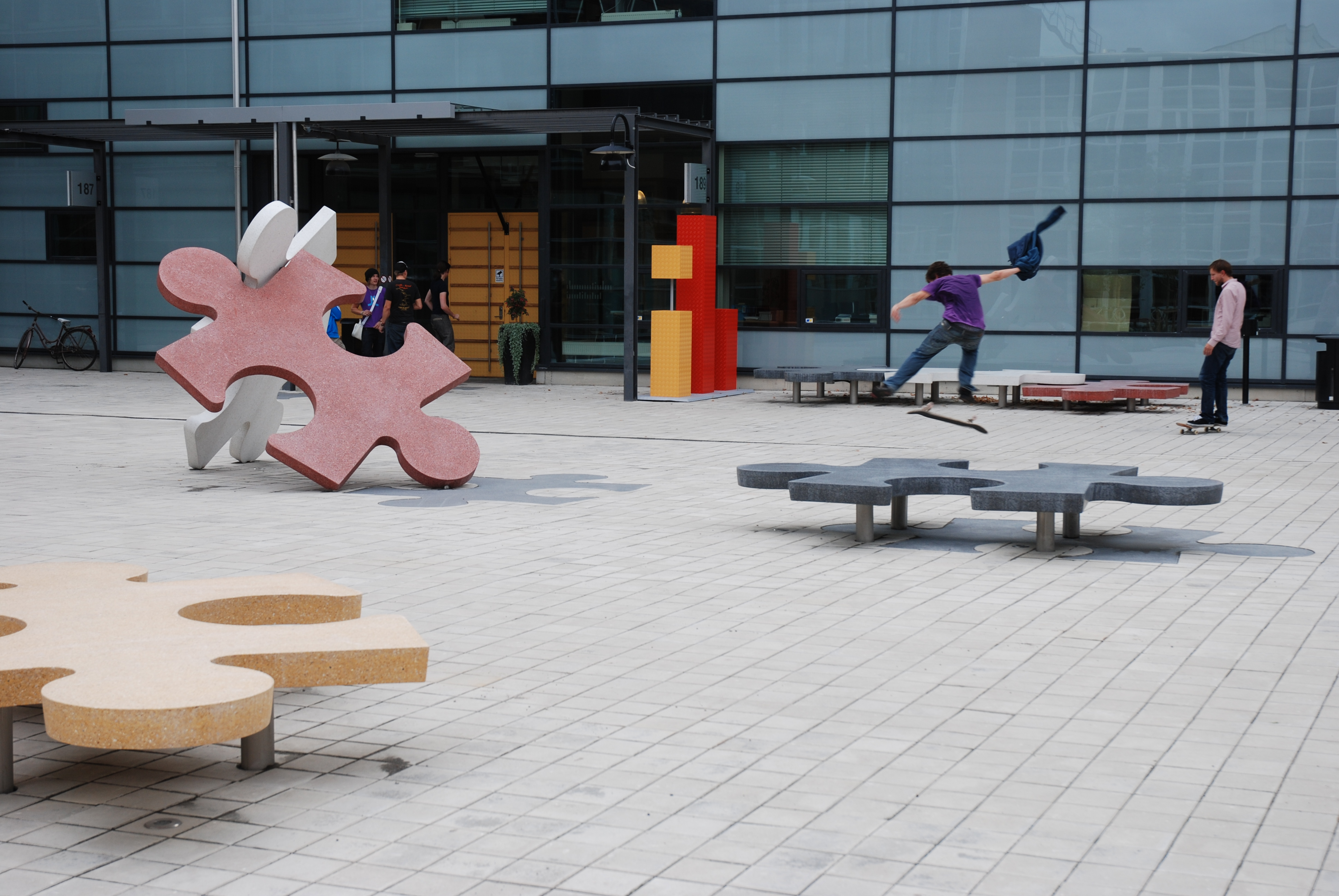
Part of Puzzled, 2008, Campus Gärdet, Stockholm

In 1994, Sidén participated in a group show in New York City called, "Who has enlarged this hole?" It took place on West 9th Street, in the brownstone where a retired psychiatrist named Alice E. Fabian had died some years before. Sidén deals with Fabian's remnants, including written journals, audio journals, books, polaroids, and strange markings on the walls. Fabian lived the last 20 years of her life alone, and she was convinced that she was the subject of surveillance. She used the tools of her trade to prove her case, collecting exhibits and evidence, clearly labeled and explained by Dr. Fabian, that built up her own case against purported FBI agents who "zap" her with electricity and bug her house. Sidén's participation in the group show was her work entitled, It's by Confining One's Neighbor that One is Convinced of One's Own Sanity, Part I (1994). The title is a play on a Dostoyevsky quote, "It is not by confining one's neighbor that one is convinced of one's own sanity."

Sidén continued working with the raw material collected from West 9th street for a number of years, focusing on madness as a creative power. The site-specific piece in New York was transformed into It's by Confining One's Neighbor that One is Convinced of One's Own Sanity, Part II (1995). The American psychiatric journals that were part of Fabian's library were used in, Would a Course of Deprol Have Saved van Gogh's Ear? (1996), where the pharmaceutical advertisements from the journal were put on display.

Sidén explains her own reaction to the advertisements that she found in the journal:

Glancing through some of the magazines it struck me that here was one of the most blatant forms of subliminal marketing. Flashy advertisements for psychiatric pharmaceutical products were mixed with serious scientific articles. The images in the advertisements often showed depressed women in their own homes, carrying such captions such as: 'She's too anxious to talk to you! For severe anxiety, SERAX (oxazepam) may well prove beneficial.' It occurred to me that exactly like religion, the psychiatric science--in spite of its very brief history--had its fair share of structurally implicated madness and violence connected to it.

== QM, I Think I Call Her QM ==
In 1997, Sidén made a 35-mm short film, QM, I Think I Call Her QM, directed by Sidén and Tony Gerber. The film merges the QM character with Alice Fabian. The film showed at the Carnegie International in 1999.

The film depicts a retired psychiatrist living alone, and one day finding a creature, QM, under her bed. She then investigates QM, subjecting her to tests and examinations. There are several possible readings of the relationship between the two characters, including mother/daughter, and alter-ego (QM is Ruth's "double"). In Sidén's own words:

If QM is a creation of Ruth she is then created by Ruth's words, her notes and studies. She is a physical manifestation of what is going on in Ruth's head or a sum of the dirt piled up in her apartment after years of confusion. What interests me in the Golem myth is definitely belief as the key to any vision, creation, theory. And also for us QM exists only if we believe in her.

== Surveillance Installations ==
Between 1997 and 2001, Sidén developed a series of video installations focused on surveillance and infrastructure. Day's Inn (1997) and Who Told The Chambermaid? (1998) show the inner-workings of a hotel on surveillance monitors mounted on a shelving system that includes towels, new toilet paper rolls, and other backroom items, suggesting that a hotel employee is spying on its guests. The camera views include the front desk, corridors, and storage closets, and they also go into the rooms, revealing dozens of guests involved in activities such as reading a newspaper, going to the bathroom, masturbating or having sex. Station 10 and Back Again (2001) repeats the formula, but uses a fire station instead of a hotel. The shelving system contains hoses and helmets, and the surveillance monitors show firemen eating, showering, sleeping, exercising and responding to an alarm. All three of these pieces are silent; their executions were all preceded by on-site research, during which Sidén lived on location. Who Told The Chambermaid? showed at the 1999 Venice Biennale.

== Warte Mal! ==
In 1998, Sidén worked in Dubi, a small German-border town in the Czech Republic where prostitution is prevalent. She recorded interviews with pimps, police, clients and the prostitutes. The result is a 13-channel video installation, Warte Mal! (1999), which consists of a sequence of rooms, arranged in a town-like fashion, with monitors and projections showing the interviews. Also presented are the moments in between the interviews, where Sidén spends time with the girls and her translator, in the bars and on the street, and excerpts from a diary Sidén kept during her stays, revealing her own immediate observations on what she is witnessing.

== Fideicommissum ==
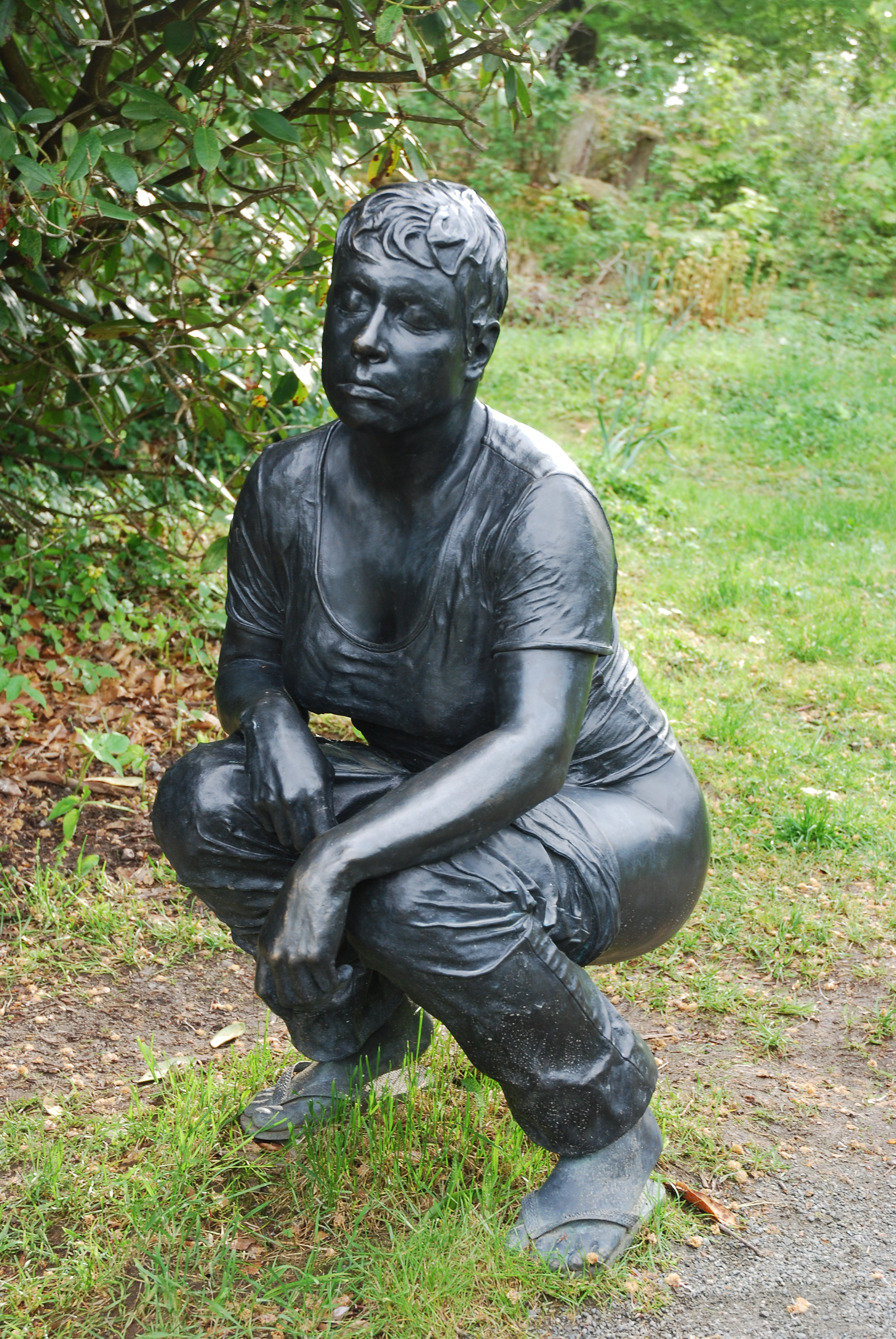
Fideicommissum, 2002, Vanås Castle

For a group show at the Wanås Foundation in southern Sweden, Sidén made a bronze, self-portrait, fountain sculpture, Fideicommissum (2000). The statue is squatting on the grass and urinating.

The title refers to the institution of Fideicommissum in Sweden, where the first-born son inherits the familial state in the aristocratic class. The Wanås sculpture park is situated on the grounds of a 15th-century castle, where this practice was in place for hundreds of years, and applies to the Wachtmeister family, who own the castle and instigated the sculpture park.

There is also a version of the sculpture in Ekebergparken Sculpture Park in Oslo, Norway.

== 3 MPH ==
In 2002, Sidén was an artist in residence at Artpace in San Antonio, Texas. For the residency, she made a journey on horse-back that lasted 25 days, and ended at the Lyndon B. Johnson Space Center in Houston, Texas. She recorded the trip on video, resulting on the work 3 MPH (2003), a title that refers to the average speed of her journey. The video installation is spread across 5 video screens, and shows Sidén on horseback, riding through towns, and the people she met along the way.

When asked about the "portrait" nature of 3 MPH, and the comparison to Robert Frank's The Americans, and the works of Walker Evans, Sidén responds:

I feel like 3 MPH is a completely new way of showing portraits of people. [...] 3 MPH was born out of a childish desire to ride on a horse, which in the modern world is regarded as an obsolete form of transportation, to the end of the world: NASA Ground Control at the Lyndon B. Johnson Space Center, Houston. From here the fastest modes of transportation are directed into new frontiers. 3 MPH is a kind of slow road movie where a constant movement from right to left displayed over 5 screens portrays the numerous people I met along my path, and a woman, myself, on a horse, making an anachronistic journey on the little piece of public land between the highway and the fences dividing large properties of open land in Texas. I made the ride in 2002, covering about 440 km in 25 days on a white appaloosa named Shaman. The sound of hoof beats on asphalt takes us from the black and Hispanic inner city of San Antonio, east to the modern all white suburbs of Houston. In between those two modern cities, the cowgirl figure blends in naturally along vast stretches of open cattle and farming landscape, riding through hidden towns that look like the source material for the legendary Western film sets that Hollywood now has torn down to make room for space film sets.

== In Passing ==
The German phenomenon known as the Baby Klappe is the subject of In Passing (2007). The 6-channel video piece shows a young girl dropping off her baby at a baby hatch, and follows her on her walk through the side streets of Berlin, simultaneously showing the doctors and nurses taking care of the abandoned baby.

In Passing is a spatially complex video work in which the viewer is encouraged to move through the installation in order to experience all parts of the narrative. On two monitors and four large projection screens, we follow parallel stories featuring the woman and the child after their separation at the hospital. As in many of her previous works, Ann-Sofi Sidén makes use of surveillance cameras. The black-and-white, documentary-feel images are interspersed with sequences in the style of cinéma vérité. In Sidén's works the viewer is not given an unambiguous image of right or wrong, cause and effect. She has the single narrative and the image split into a number of voices, situations, moments and stories.

In Passing is equally much a calling into question of our human failings in the present moment, and a test of the strength of the bond between children and parents, the vulnerability of the abandoned, and the pain of separation.

== Same Unknown (strains 1, 2 and 3) ==
Sidén created the 4-channel video installation Same Unknown (2008) for the occasion of Fotografia Europea, in Reggio Emilia, Italy. She invited over 200 people to slide down a metallic pole, similar to the ones used in old firestations. The resulting video piece, with 4 large monitors mounted vertically in the windows of a multi-story building in Reggio Emilia, shows the participants sliding down the pole after announcing their name and place of birth.

The core idea for Same Unknown comes from some observations I made in a fire station in 2000. Emergency pole? Yes and no. The Moro reflex is present at birth, peaking in the first month of life and beginning to disappear around 2 months of age. A baby's startled reaction, startled response an embrace reflex.

After filming over 200 persons in Reggio Emilia the pole has become an axis around which life spirals down at different speeds, always into the same unknown. Who, where to and why?

The fragility and brevity of life. A simple task that requires concentration and a sort of bravery. The video camera exposing details of body language and facial expressions of people of different ages and origins. Maybe it tells us something about vulnerability, about who they are, or want to be, even if only for a very brief moment.

For the occasion of the Venice Biennale in 2009, Sidén re-edited the material collected in Reggio Emilia for Same Unknown, added a sound score designed by Jonathan Bepler, and created the 9-channel video installation, Same Unknown (strains 1, 2 and 3). The three strains refer to the three poles that are mounted in the exhibition space. Each pole has three monitors.

== My Country (Somewhere in Sweden) ==
Sidén and a colleague at the Royal Institute of Art embarked on a 38-day, 720 km horseback ride from Stockholm to Wanås, in the south of Sweden, in the fall of 2009. The journey was filmed and made into the 4-channel HD video installation, "My Country (Somewhere in Sweden)".

== Curtain Callers ==
Sidén and composer Jonathan Bepler collaborated on "Curtain Callers" from 2009–2011, during which time they filmed and recorded sounds at the Royal Dramatic Theatre in Stockholm. The result was a single-channel film, "Curtain Callers" and a 5-channel HD video installation, called "Curtain Callers (Entracte)." Both works employ the right-to-left panning motion that Sidén used in earlier works. The material consists of the backstage process of a working theater, including stage hands, cleaners, actors rehearsing in dressing rooms, and script read-throughs; also included in the material is a live event held at the Royal Dramatic Theater in April, 2010, when over 600 choir members in and around Stockholm were invited to sit as audience members and perform under the conducting of Bepler. The projects were produced by Mobile Art Production (MAP).

== Exhibitions ==
- 1997 Steirischer Herbst, Graz, Austria
- 1998 Manifesta 2, Luxemburg
- 1998 XXIV Bienal de São Paulo, São Paulo, Brazil
- 1999 Wiener Secession, Vienna, Austria
- 1999 Venice Biennale, Italy
- 1999 Carnegie International, Pittsburgh, USA
- 2000 Contemporary Arts Museum, Houston, Texas, USA
- 2000 Nordhorn, Germany
- 2000 Villa Arson, Nice, France
- 2001 Kunst Haus Dresden, Germany
- 2001 Musée d'art Moderne de la Ville de Paris, Paris, France
- 2002 Art Pace, San Antonio, Texas, USA
- 2002 Hayward Gallery, London, England
- 2002 National Museum of Contemporary Art, Athens, Greece
- 2002 Biennale of Sydney, Australia
- 2004 Kölnischer Kunstverein, Cologne, Germany
- 2004 Moderna Museet, Stockholm, Sweden
- 2004 Hamburger Bahnhof, Berlin, Germany
- 2004 Biennale of Sydney, Australia
- 2004 Contemporary Arts Museum, Houston, Texas, USA
- 2005 Centro Galego de Arte Contemporánea, Santiago de Compostela, Spain
- 2005 MASS Moca, North Adams, Massachusetts, USA
- 2005 Kölnischer Kunstverein, Cologne, Germany
- 2006 P.S.1, Queens, New York & KunstWerke, Berlin, Germany
- 2006 Museo Centro de Arte Reina Sofía, Madrid, Spain
- 2006 Haus am Waldsee, Berlin, Germany
- 2007 MARCO, Vigo, Spain,
- 2007 Institut Valenciá d'Art Modern, Generalitat Valenciana, Valencia, Spain
- 2007 Fotomuseum Winterhur, Zürich, Switzerland
- 2009 Venice Biennale, Italy
- 2010 Moderna Utställning, Moderna Museet, Stockholm, Sweden
- 2011 Freud Museum, A View From Outside—Reloaded, Vienna, Austria
- 2011 Curtain Callers, Royal Dramatic Theater, Stockholm, Sweden
- 2011 Curtain Callers (Entracte), Västra Stallet, Stockholm, Sweden
- 2011 Curtain Callers, The Gothenburg Film Festival, Gothenburg, Sweden
- 2014 19th Biennale of Sydney, Australia
- 2014 EVA International Biennial, Ireland

== Bibliography ==
- Sidén, Ann-Sofi, Ann-Sofi Siden : In Between The Best Of Worlds, Steidl, 2005, ISBN 3-86521-086-4 / 9783865210869
- Sidén, Ann-Sofi, Enquete : The Panning Eye Revisited 10 Mars-6 Mai 2001, Musee D'art Moderne De La Ville De Paris, Paris Musees, 2001, ISBN 2-87900-566-3 / 9782879005669
- Sidén, Ann-Sofi, Warte Mal! Prostitution After the Velvet Revolution, Hayward Gallery Publishing, 2001, ISBN 1-85332-225-3
- Sidén, Ann-Sofi, No. 144 It's By Confining One's Neighbor That One Is Convinced Of One's Own Sanity, Utica Publishing, 1995, ISBN 91-972324-1-6
