= Fideicommissum (sculpture) =

Sculpture by Ann-Sofi Sidén

Coordinates: 56.185219°N 14.044237°E

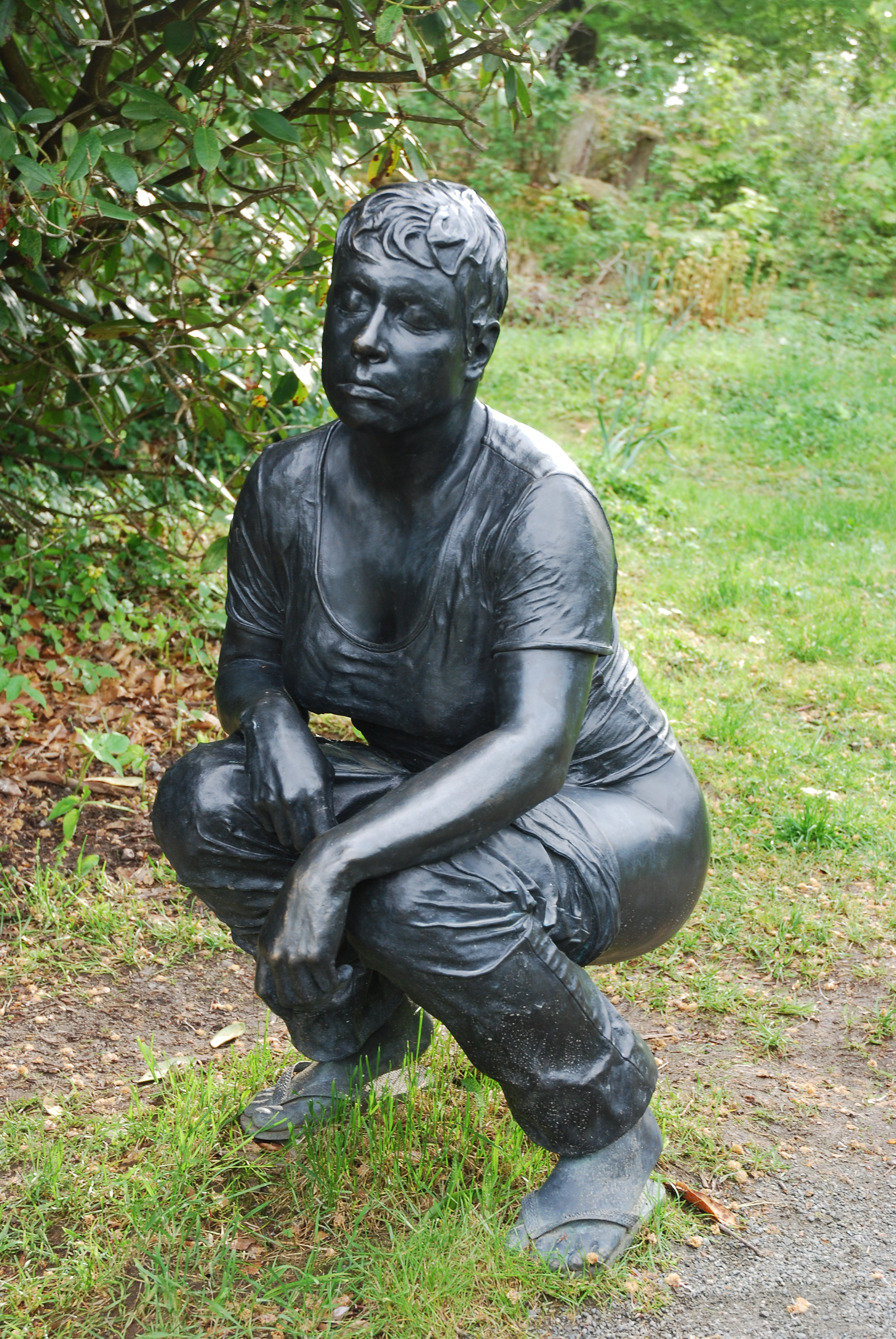
Fideicommissum in Wanås Sculpture Park.

Fideicommissum is a public artwork by the Swedish artist Ann-Sofi Sidén, originally created in 2000 for the Wanås Sculpture Park in Skåne, Sweden. The work is an edition of six.

== History ==
The first edition of Fideicommissum was placed in the Wanås Sculpture Park, which is situated at Wanås Castle in Skåne.

== Description ==
=== Name ===
The title Fideicommissum refers to the former legal institution of the entail, under which estates and other family properties were passed down from one generation to the next, often benefitting the eldest son. In Sweden, a law abolishing entailed estates was implemented in 1964. Sidén's sculpture is located on the shore of a pond, with a view of the castle, which was entailed until 1978. The title Fideicommissum and the placement of the sculpture emphasize that the work refers to a staking out of territory.

=== Composition ===
Fideicommissum is a bronze cast of the artist herself squatting down to urinate. The artwork functions as a fountain and makes reference to the fountain motifs of young males urinating. Sidén conceived the idea for the sculpture in 1999 during a visit to the Wanås Sculpture Park, when she was working on a film and had to retire to the bushes to relieve herself. According to the artist, the urinating narrative echoes to a primitive way to mark a territory.

The composition of the artwork has historical references. The sculpture's hair, sandals and folds of clothing are modelled on Roman, Greek and Etruscan sculptures.

== Editions ==
The first version of Fideicommissum was made for the Wanås Sculpture Park. Another is at Ekebergparken Sculpture Park in Oslo, Norway.

Sidén also documented the installation of the first edition of the sculpture at the sculpture park in Wanås. That project resulted in a video work called Head Lake Piss Down (2000).
