= Kari Cavén =

Finnish sculptor

Kari Cavén (born 13 March 1954 in Savonlinna) is a Finnish artist. He represented Finland at the Venice Biennale in 1988, 1990 and 1995.

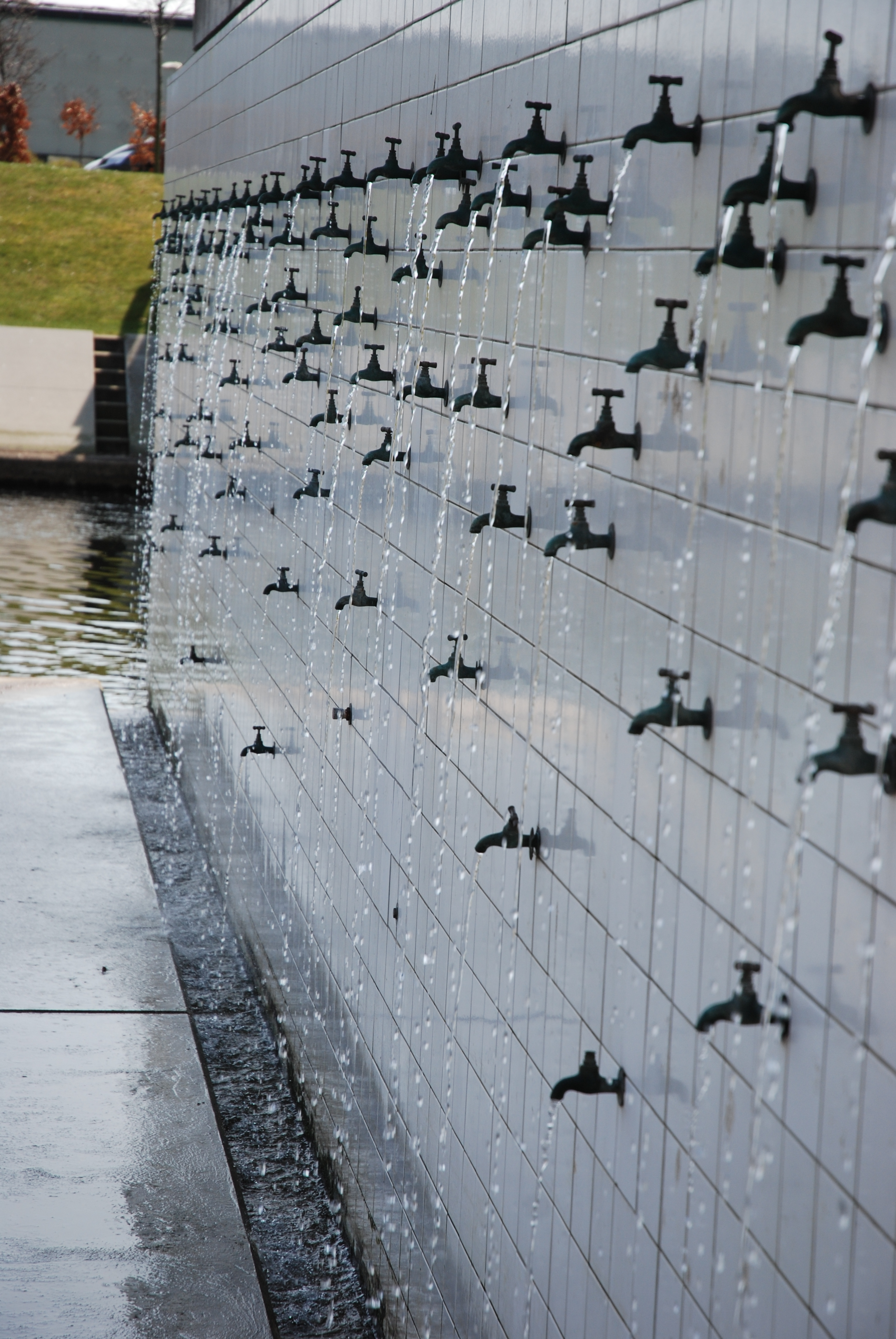
Waterfall (2001), Västra Hamnen, Malmö, Sweden

== Selected works ==
- Cow Chapel (1993), Wanås Castle
- Waterfall (2001), Västra Hamnen, Malmö, Sweden
- Forest grove (2002), Umedalen skulpturpark
