= Atang Tshikare =

South African artist and designer (born 1980)

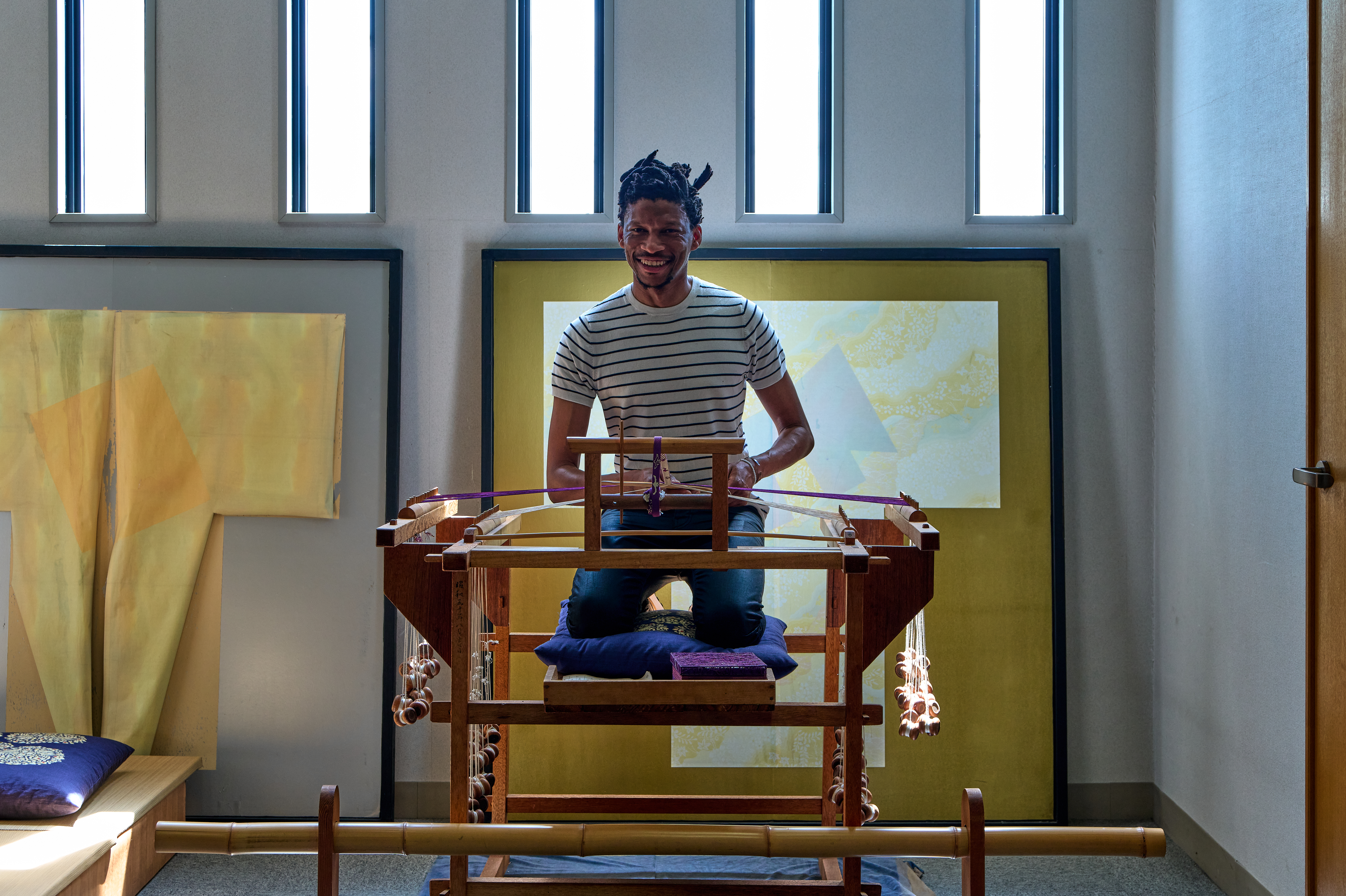
- Tshikare pictured learning traditional Japanese Iga Kumihimo braiding (2025)
- Born: 1980 (age 45–46); Bloemfontein
- Occupations: Artist, designer, sculptor
- Website: atangtshikare.com

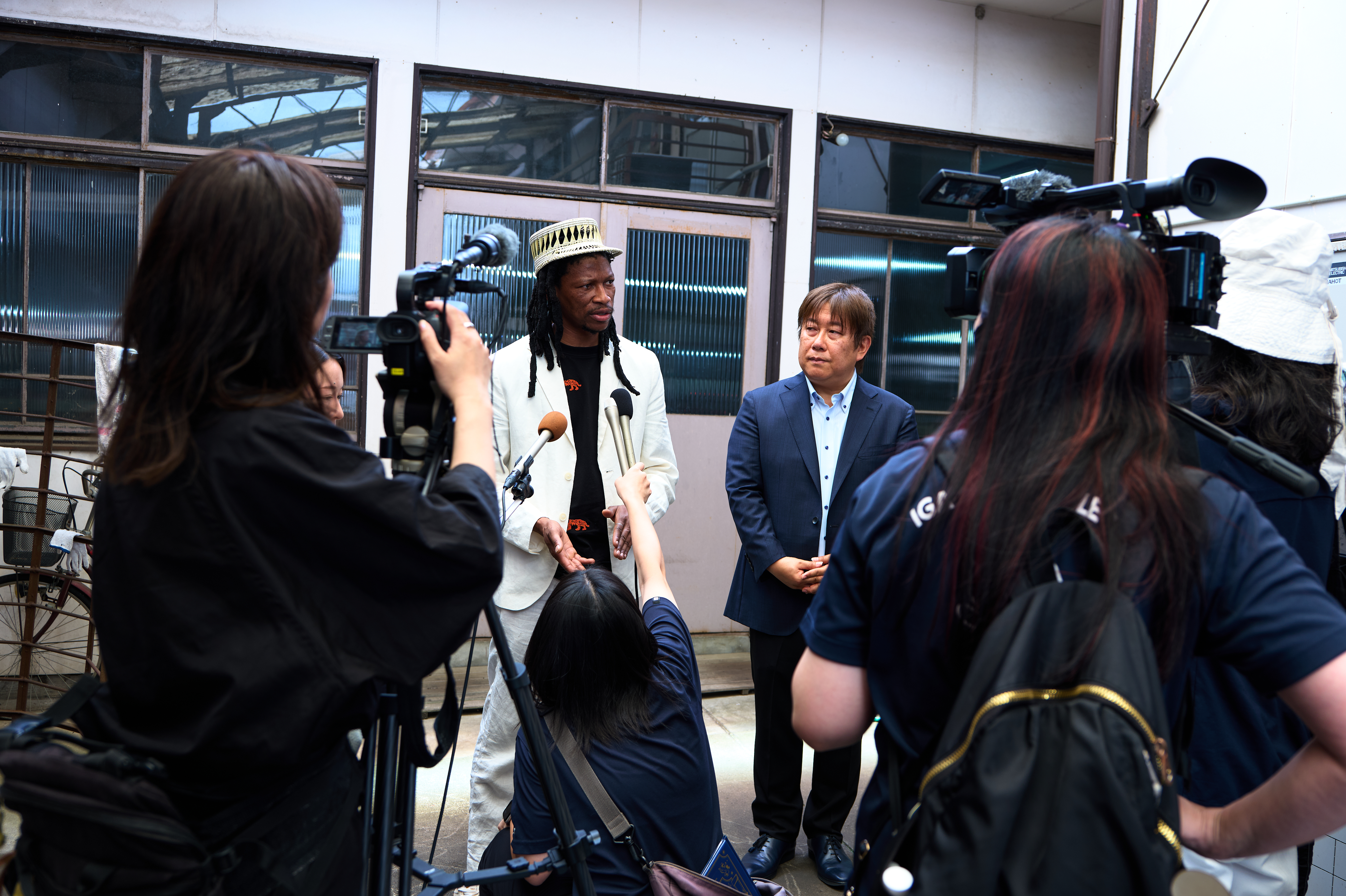
Tshikare and artisan Tomoyuki Matsuda (松田智行) speaking with television journalists, Mie Prefecture, Japan (2025)

Atang Tshikare (born 1980) is a South African artist, designer, and cultural futurist. His work addresses themes relating to folklore and Tswana heritage, while exploring the relationship between craft and technology, often through the language of vernacular architecture, zoomorphism, biomorphism, and African landscapes.

== Biography ==
Tshikare was born in Bloemfontein, South Africa in 1980. His mother was a businesswoman, and his father was an anti-Apartheid activist and illustrator.

He lives and works in Cape Town. His practice spans the fields of craft, design, and fine art. He has worked in bronze, ceramic, stone, and wood, and has explored both traditional craft techniques, and complex digital modelling, combined with rapid prototyping and 3D printing technologies.

Tshikare founded Zabalazaa Designs in 2010, and since then his studio has consulted for companies and brands such as Adidas, Belvedere, BMW, Dior, MTV, and Puma, as well developing and producing his sculptural designs and other commissions. He won the 2014 Design Foundation "Future Found" award, was named one of the "Top 200 Young South Africans" in 2015, and dubbed the "Designer of the Day" by Surface magazine in 2020.

Tshikare's work has been exhibited in venues ranging from Milan's Salone del Mobile, to gallery shows such as Inside~Out 2024, in Brooklyn, New York, and art fairs such as Design Miami, the London Design Festival and PAD London, and Design Days in Dubai. His work is held in private and public collections such as the Zeitz MOCCA in Cape Town, and the Metropolitan Museum, which in 2022 acquired a duo of his Mollo Oa Leifo chairs (fire in the hearth – Girl and fire in the hearth – Mother) for its Afrofuturist Period Room.

In 2025, Wanås Konst in Sweden installed Tshikare's mythical creature called Puruma in its Wanås Castle sculpture park. The title of the artwork means "roar" in Setswana, and the piece, which is situated on an island resembling a nest in a small pond, represents a hybrid animal with a lion-like body and the head of a King Protea–South Africa's national flower.

Also in 2025, Tshikare was invited to take part in the Tokai Project, the second edition of the Craft x Tech initiative in Japan. The programme is an exploration of how traditional "aesthetic sensibilities embedded in Japanese craft can be reimagined through a thoughtful and skilful creative process" and reinterpreted through the lens of contemporary technology. His work, a sculptural lighting piece incorporating ancient Iga Kumihimo silk braiding techniques, is titled Yamollo. The work was exhibited at Kudan House in Tokyo and subsequently at the Victoria and Albert Museum during the London Design Festival.

He has also participated in design juries, panels, workshops and symposia, and lectured widely in both South Africa and internationally.

== Personal life ==
Tshikare is married and has a son named Peo, which signifies "seed of great hope" in Sesotho. His wife is a sociolinguist at the University of Cape Town. Tshikare's works Peo e Atang and Pula e ya na are a tribute to their sons (the second of whom is called Pula Khanya, meaning "falling rain and light").
