= The Sieve of Eratosthenes (sculpture) =

Sculpture in Stanford, California, US

- The sculpture in 2018
- Artist: Mark di Suvero
- Year: 1999
- Location: Stanford, California, U.S.; 37°25′31.2″N 122°9′56.4″W

The Sieve of Eratosthenes is a 1999 sculpture by Mark di Suvero, installed on the Stanford University campus in Stanford, California.

== History ==
The artwork was added to Stanford's collection in 2000. It was dedicated to John Henry Merryman on his 80th birthday.

In 2014, the 23-foot (7.0 m) sculpture was relocated from outside the Cantor Arts Center to the lawn between Escondido and Meyer Library.

== See also ==
- 1999 in art
