= Civil law (common law) =

Branch of English common law

Civil law is a major "branch of the law", in common law legal systems including those in England and Wales and in the United States, where it stands in contrast to criminal law. Private law, which relates to civil wrongs and quasi-contracts, is part of civil law, as is contract law and law of property (excluding property-related crimes, such as theft or vandalism).

== Analysis ==
Civil law may, like criminal law, be divided into substantive law and procedural law. Substantive law refers to the determination of how the law applies to facts, and procedural law refers to regulations on how the substantive law is administered. The rights and duties of persons (natural persons and legal persons) amongst themselves are the primary concern of civil law.

Around the English-speaking world, many scholars of law, philosophy, politics, and history study the theoretical foundations and applications of the common law. When used in the context of a common law legal system, the term civil law means that branch of the law not including criminal law.

The common law system, which originated in medieval England, is often contrasted with the civil law legal system originating in France and Italy. Whereas the civil law takes the form of legal codes such as the Napoleonic Code, the common law comes from uncodified case law that arises as a result of judicial decisions, recognising prior court decisions as legally binding precedent.

Civil litigation refers to legal proceedings undertaken to resolve a dispute regarding an alleged civil wrong and seeking redress or payment of damages. It includes the process of one party notifying the other that they have a cause for action. It is often suggested that civil litigation proceedings are undertaken for the purpose of obtaining compensation for injury, and may thus be distinguished from criminal proceedings, whose purpose is to inflict punishment. However, exemplary damages or punitive damages may be awarded in civil proceedings. It was also formerly possible for common informers to sue for a penalty in civil proceedings.

Because some courts have both a civil and criminal jurisdiction, civil proceedings cannot be defined as those taken in civil courts. In the United States, the expression "civil courts" is used as a shorthand for "trial courts in civil cases". In England and other common-law countries, the burden of proof in civil proceedings is, in general—with a number of exceptions such as committal proceedings for civil contempt—proof on a balance of probabilities. In civil cases in the law of the Maldives, the burden of proof requires the plaintiff to convince the court of the plaintiff's entitlement to the relief sought. This means that the plaintiff must prove each element of the claim, or cause of action in order to recover.

The cost of pursuing civil litigation has sometimes been highlighted as excessive relative to the scale of the issue to be resolved. Where costs are too high, they can restrict access to justice.

== See also ==
- Outline of civil law (common law)
- Civil code
- Administrative law
- Federal law
- Federal Rules of Civil Procedure
- Natural law
