= The Artist's Reserved Rights Transfer and Sale Agreement =

The Artist's Reserved Rights Transfer and Sale Agreement, 1971

The Artist's Reserved Rights Transfer and Sale Agreement (also known as the Artist's Contract or Projansky Deal) is an open-source legal contract for the transfer and sale of an individual work of art in any medium, material or immaterial, including digital art. The agreement was conceived by curator, dealer, and publisher of conceptual art Seth Siegelaub, and drafted by lawyer Robert Projansky as a means to "remedy some generally acknowledged inequities in the art world, particularly artists lack of control over their work and participation in its economy after they no longer own it". The agreement specifies the rights, royalties and responsibilities of the collector (purchaser) relative to the original creator.

Use of the agreement has been controversial despite being posited as the standard contract for the sale of contemporary art. Article 2 of the contract stipulates that collectors agree to give the artist a resale royalty of 15% of the increase in price over the initial sale. Article 7 gives artists the right to veto the exhibition of their sold works. Designed to create transparency in an industry known for its "private, cash-based, and informal nature," the contract is associated with Conceptual Art, Minimalism and efforts by the Art Workers Coalition, and others, in the 1970s that focused on decentralizing the art market and institution.

While, in theory, the Contract was intended to protect artists' rights to resale royalties and other intellectual property rights (e.g., copyrights), in practice, it has proven to be challenging to reinforce due to limited copyright protection laws for resale royalties in some countries. For example, the US does not have a federal resale royalty statute.

== History ==
The Artist's Contract was first published by the School of Visual Arts, New York, as a fold out poster,. One side features an introductory text by Siegelaub explaining the principles behind the Contract, how it was researched, and instructions for use. On the reverse is the contract itself, authored by Projansky. The graphic design is by Cristos Gianakos. The final page of the contract portion features a form that must be signed by the artist and the collector of their work, and is intended to be affixed to the artwork itself. Artists were encouraged to reproduce the Contract multiple times and to use it in any transfer of their work.

Seth Siegelaub said, “The artist contract [was a] modest project… Its intention was just to first articulate the kinds of interest existing in a work of art, and then, to shift the relative power relationships concerning these interests more in the favor of the artist. In no way was it intended to be a radical act; it was intended to be a practical real life, hands on, easy to use, no bullshit solution to a series of problems concerning artists’ control over their work; it wasn’t proposing to do away with the art object, it was just proposing a simple way that the artist could have more control over his or her artwork once it left their studio. Period. But the broader socioeconomic questions of the changing role and function of art in society, the possibility of alternative ways of art making or the support of the existence of the artist; all these important questions are not addressed here. As a practical solution, the contract did not question the limits of capitalism and its private property; it just shifted the balance of power in favor of the artist over some aspects of a work of art once it was sold.”

In 1987, Hans Haacke's “On Social Grease” was resold at a Christie's auction under the Artist's Contract. The document was displayed on a pedestal next to Haacke's wall piece. With the contract, the work was sold for more than double the estimate and, at $90,000, was more expensive than any previously sold works by the artist.

== Legacy ==
The Artist's Contract was translated into French, German, Dutch and Italian in the early 1970s. A new Dutch translation was produced for the exhibition "Seth Siegelaub: Beyond Conceptual Art" at the Stedelijk Museum, Amsterdam, 2015. The French version of the Contract was edited by lawyer Michel Claura to be appropriate for use in the French legal context.

The Artists Contract has been republished numerous times in art magazines and art historical studies, and legal resource books. Arts magazines in which The Contract was reproduced include: Studio International, April 1971; Art News, April 1971; Arts Canada, April 1971; Domus, April 1971; New York Element, June–July 1971; museumjournaal, September 1971; documenta 5, 1972; Bulletin, October 1972; Leonardo, June 1973

In 2009 German artist Maria Eichhorn produced the book The Artists Contract featuring interviews with artists using the contract including Jackie Windsor and Hans Haacke, and others who were present for its development, such as Lawrence Weiner, Robert Barry, Carl Andre, and others. Artist Adrian Piper, who uses a modified version in the sale of her work, was interviewed as well.

== Available formats ==
A PDF of the Artists Contract is available through Primary Information.
