= Claes Hake =

Swedish sculptor (1945–2025)

- Born: 7 February 1945; Mölndal, Sweden
- Died: 16 October 2025 (aged 80)
- Education: Valand Art Academy
- Known for: Sculpting
- Notable work: Solringen (1993); 1998 Gothenburg discotheque fire memorial (2008)

Claes Hake (7 February 1945 – 16 October 2025) was a Swedish sculptor. He was known for monumental stone sculptures, which were displayed in public settings such as parks and train stations. Two of his most notable works are Solringen, displayed at the Gothenburg University Library, and the memorial for the victims of the 1998 Gothenburg discotheque fire. His sculptures have been displayed in Scandinavia, Germany, and the United States.

== Early life and education ==
Hake was born in Mölndal on 7 February 1945. He was dyslexic. He was accepted to the Valand Art Academy in 1963, at the age of 17. He received his master's degree at 22. He was first interested in painting before sculpting.

== Career ==
In the first ten years after graduating from Valand, he sold just three sculptures. He supported himself working as a stagehand at the Gothenburg City Theatre.

Hake's 1982 bronze sculpture Bohuslän, usually displayed at Gothenburg Central Station, was stolen in 1992. It was later recovered and donated to the city's cultural committee. He sculpted Solringen, which was installed in 1993 at the Gothenburg University Library. His 1995 sculpture Arch is displayed in Umedalen skulpturpark. He was awarded a ten-year fellowship from the Swedish Fine Arts Foundation in 1997.

With fellow sculptors Pål Svensson and Kent Karlsson, he had a group showing in Gothenburg in 2005.

He designed the memorial for the victims of the 1998 Gothenburg discotheque fire. The names of the 62 victims were engraved on a slab of polished blue granite, measuring 10 m (33 ft) long and 2 m (6.6 ft) high. The memorial was unveiled in 2008, on the tenth anniversary of the fire.

His 2020 solo exhibition at the Wetterling Gallery received praise from Birgitta Rubin in Dagens Nyheter. In 2024, many of his works (made between 1962 and 2024) were exhibited in a career retrospective at the Nordic Watercolour Museum in Tjörn. The exhibit was acclaimed by Boel Ulfsdotter in Göteborgs-Posten.

He exhibited Döskallar och Dönickar, containing 70 bronze sculptures, at Galleri Thomassen from 13 September to 5 October 2025. Hake was seriously ill at the time of the show, and Karin Frid of Göteborgs-Posten characterised the exhibit as a "chance to say goodbye."

== Death ==
Hake died on 16 October 2025, at the age of 80.
