= 1998 Gothenburg discotheque fire =

1998 arson attack in Gothenburg, Sweden

Gothenburg discothèque fire
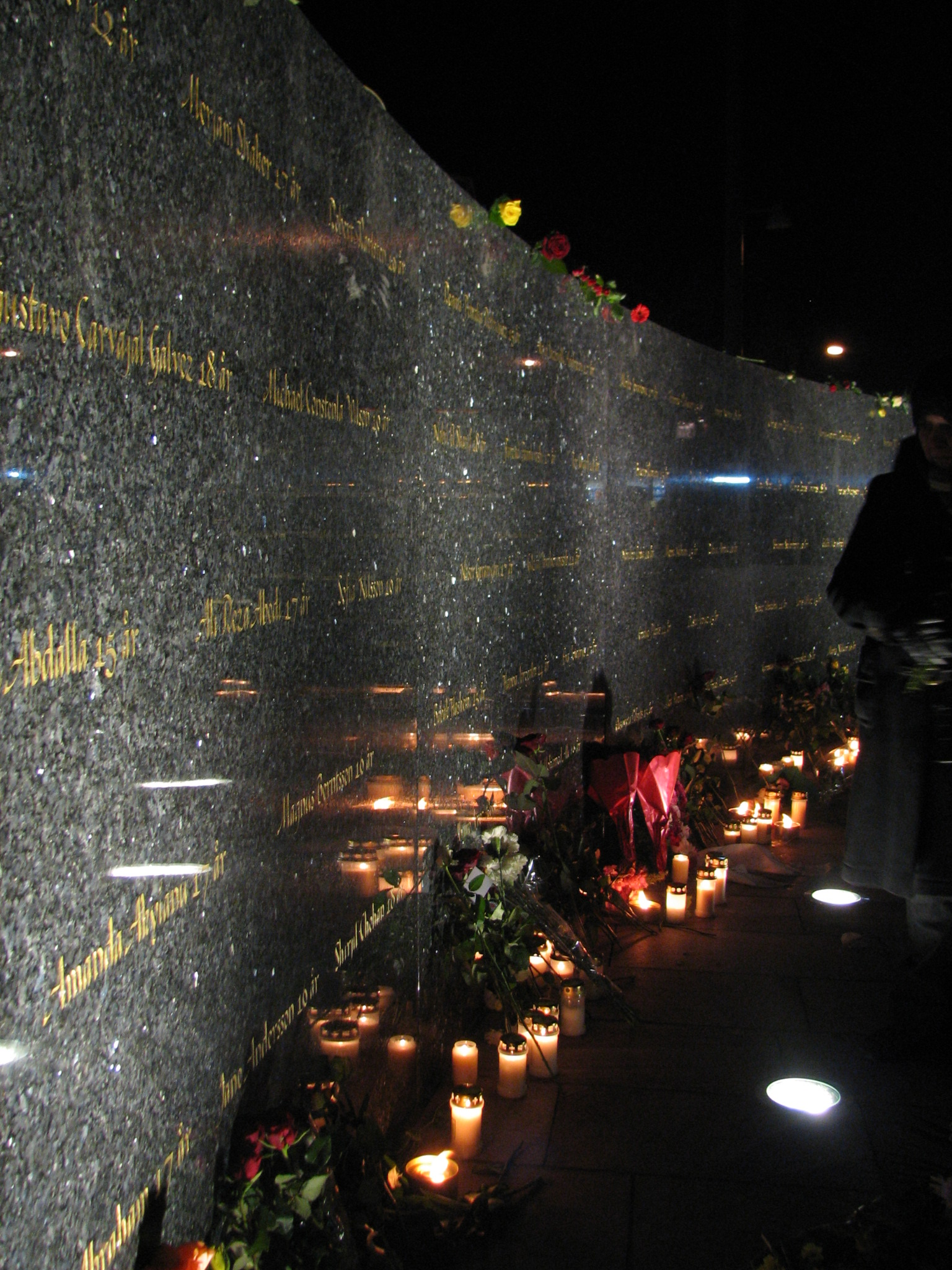
- Claes Hake's memorial for the dead, unveiled on the tenth anniversary of the fire in late-October 2008
- Location: 57°43′12.788″N 11°57′0.734″E; Gothenburg, Sweden
- Date: 29 October 1998 c. 23:40 (CET)
- Attack type: Arson, mass murder
- Deaths: 63
- Injuries: 213
- Perpetrators: Shoresh Kaveh; Housein Arsani; Mohammad Mohammadamini; Meysam Mohammadyeh
- Motive: Retaliation for being denied free entry into the discothèque

The Gothenburg discothèque fire was caused by an arson attack on 29 October 1998, which occurred on premises located on Hisingen island in Gothenburg, Sweden. The premises, which belonged to an organization catering to the Macedonian community in Gothenburg, had been rented for the night by secondary school students for the purpose of hosting a discothèque. At the time of the fire, 375 people aged 12–25 were present, the vast majority of whom had various ethnic minority backgrounds. The fire department had estimated the building could only hold up to 150. In all, 63 were killed and 213 injured.

== Fire ==
The fire started on the premises of the Macedonian organization on the third floor, where a discothèque for secondary school students had been arranged to celebrate Halloween. Earlier, to make space for the dance floor, numerous tables and chairs were removed and stacked up in a stairway that served as the building's emergency exit, thereby blocking it. A table, used as a ticket counter, was also placed at the main entrance, thereby narrowing it. At approximately 11:25 pm, the stack of chairs in the stairway was set ablaze with a flammable liquid, after which guests at the event noticed foul-smelling smoke, which was originally thought to have come from the smoke machine. A DJ at the party then saw the emergency exit on fire and warned guests to leave immediately. Most of the guests initially did not heed this warning. When smoke began to fill the room, guests rushed to exit the premises. With the emergency exit blocked and on fire, a single stairway became the only available escape route. As guests tried to escape, they trampled on one another, creating a bottleneck. At this time, the fire had spread to the dance floor, where the table from earlier had been moved to let guests escape more quickly. As the commotion ensued, the table ended up in front of the entrance, blocking the escape route and thereby creating another bottleneck. Many guests were forced to climb on top of one another and jump out from windows to safety, but since these were 2.2 metres (7.2 feet) above floor level and 5 metres (16 feet) above ground level outside the building, many were injured in the process. Furthermore, adherence to fire safety standards was generally poor at the site. The building also lacked sprinklers and a fire alarm system.

The first emergency call arrived at 23:42, but due to the background noise, it was some time before the operator could understand what the caller was trying to say. At 23:45 a so-called "major call-out" took place from a fire station on the island, and four minutes later the first rescue team arrived on the scene. Six other fire crews were dispatched a short time afterwards. About 60 young people were rescued by firefighters with self-contained breathing apparatus, 40 of whom were led down the staircase and 20 carried out through the windows. Others managed to escape on their own.

== Victims ==
A total of 63 young people were killed and 213 were injured, of whom 50 seriously. For some time afterwards, it could not be determined whether the fire had been accidental or caused by an arson attack, but speculation soon started that the fire, whose victims were mainly immigrants, had been started with xenophobic or racist motives. Posters were distributed around Gothenburg with the text "60 young immigrants have died, now 60 Swedes must die." It was later ascertained that the four suspected arsonists were themselves immigrants from Iran.

== Investigation ==
On 1 June 1999, it was reported that two suspects had been arrested but later released. In December, a reward of 3 million kronor was offered for information that might help to ascertain the cause of the fire. At that time, no one was sure how it had started, despite over 1,400 people being questioned by the Swedish police. Later that month, the police also appealed for leads on a national TV show. In January 2000, three suspects were eventually taken into custody by the police, and in February a fourth was arrested. However, it is believed they were apprehended before the reward had even been offered. No preliminary investigation was ever started against the party's arrangers.

== Criminal prosecution ==
The fire had been set by four teenagers aged 17–19, who had been denied free entry to the disco as a result of an argument. All four were charged and found guilty of aggravated arson, and the firestarter, Shoresh Kaveh, was sentenced by the district court in 2000 to eight years' imprisonment. Two others, Housein Arsani and Mohammad Mohammadamini, were sentenced to six years in prison, while the fourth, Meysam Mohammadyeh, who was a minor at the time of the offence, received three years in a juvenile care facility. Both the defendants and the prosecution appealed the sentences. The court of appeals upheld two of the verdicts, but the two verdicts of six years' imprisonment were raised to seven years.

Mohammadyeh, nicknamed the youngest by the press, was represented by Leif Silbersky. It was established that the other three suspects were friends, and although Mohammadyeh had wanted to become friends with two of them, he was afraid of Kaveh. Silbersky asked for Mohammadyeh to be acquitted, as in his opinion thought Mohammadyeh should not be held legally responsible for his passivity. The court of appeals, however, considered it proven that the four "had mutually agreed to ruin the party by starting a fire", and that it was of "decisive importance with regards to the question of guilt that it had not been possible to prove that no other person or persons than Kaveh had torn the paper or started the fire in the stairway." Professor Christian Diesen is of the opinion that it is possible that Mohammadyeh had "become involved in a sequence of events he had no control over and would have been judged differently if the fire had not had such devastating consequences." The penalties may be regarded as mild by international comparison, but Swedish law at the time allowed those aged 18–20 to be sentenced to a maximum of 8 years of prison, which was given to the leader. Those under 18 are given prison only for severe violent crimes, a maximum of 4 years.

The case was prosecuted by Thomas Bodström, who later became Minister for Justice in Sweden.

== Legacy ==
Relatives of the victims later founded the non-profit organization BOA (association for the relatives of the fire victims), which later for example was in contact with the relatives of victims in a similar discothèque fire in Volendam, Netherlands, and offered support to relatives of victims of the 2004 tsunami. The fire department in Gothenburg, as well as survivors and relatives of victims, also provide information to raise awareness among young people of how quickly a small fire can spread and the potential consequences.

On the tenth anniversary of the fire in 2008, a permanent memorial was unveiled, made out of polished granite with the name and age of each victim engraved in gold. The monument was placed at Backaplan in the part of Hisingen where the fire occurred. It was designed by the sculptor Claes Hake.

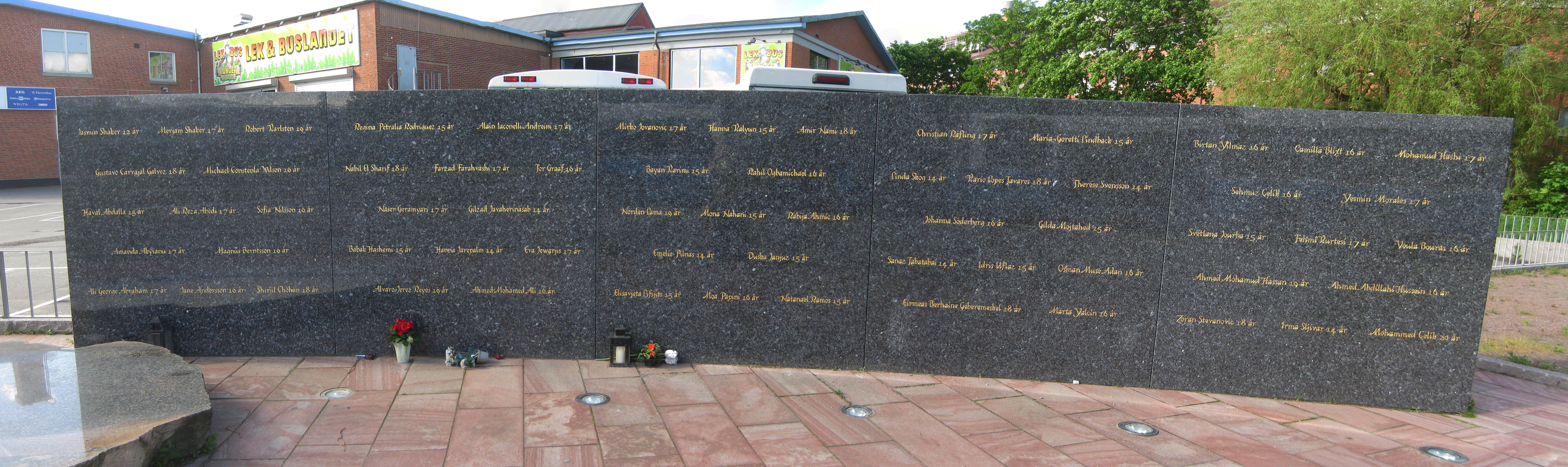
Memorial at Backaplan in 2012
