= John Henry Merryman =

American legal scholar (1920–2015)

- Born: February 25, 1920; Portland, Oregon, United States
- Died: August 3, 2015 (aged 95); Menlo Park, California, United States
- Occupation: Law Professor
- Awards: Guggenheim Fellowship (1985)

Academic background
- Education: University of Portland, Notre Dame Law School, New York University Law School

Academic work
- Discipline: Law
- Sub-discipline: Comparative law, art law
- Institutions: Santa Clara University School of Law, Stanford Law School

John Henry Merryman (February 25, 1920 – August 3, 2015) was an American legal scholar known for his work in comparative law and art law. He was remembered as "one of the most influential academics in the field of art and law." He was the author of approximately 25 books and 200 scholarly articles.

Merryman was a professor at Stanford Law School where he held the Nelson Bowman Sweitzer and Marie B. Sweitzer Professorship of Law. He is considered the founder of art law as a field of legal study in the United States. The author of various texts on the civil law tradition, including The Civil Law Tradition, he was the country's foremost expert on that legal tradition.

== Personal life and education ==
Merryman was born February 25, 1920 in Portland, Oregon. He grew up in Portland where he attended Roosevelt High School, graduating in 1938.

Merryman was the first person in his family to attend university. He studied at the University of Portland, first in music and then in chemistry, earning his bachelor's degree in 1943. He subsequently earned a master's degree in chemistry from the University of Notre Dame, and began but did not finish a Ph.D. in chemistry at the University of Chicago. He subsequently taught undergraduate chemistry at Notre Dame, where he began his legal studies. He earned a Juris Doctor (JD) from Notre Dame in 1947. He earned a Master of Laws at New York University Law School in 1951, and a Doctor of Juridical Science in 1955.

Merryman was married to Nancy Edwards from 1953 until her death in 2013. Because both of them had previously been divorced, their marriage led to his dismissal from the faculty of the Catholic Santa Clara University School of Law. During Merryman's studies in Germany Edwards became interested in art and later became a dealer in prints.

Merryman died at home in Menlo Park, California on August 3, 2015. His obituary listed the cause of death as "old age".

== Career ==
Merryman taught at Santa Clara from 1948 to 1953 and then at Stanford Law School. At Stanford he was appointed as the law school's law librarian in 1955, becoming only the second to hold that position since 1910.

While in Italy in 1962, Merryman met with Italian professors of law. With Mauro Cappelletti of the University of Florence and Joseph Perillo of Fordham University, he wrote the work The Italian Legal System: An Introduction, which was finally published in 1967. John T. Noonan Jr. described it as a "crisp and penetrating study".

In 1968 and 1969 he was a Fulbright scholar at the Max Planck Institute for Comparative and International Private Law. While there, he wrote The Civil Law Tradition: An Introduction to the Legal Systems of Western Europe and Latin America, which was published in 1969.

In 1971, Merryman was appointed Nelson Bowman Sweitzer & Marie B. Sweitzer Professor of Law. In that year he began holding lectures on art law, initially with the art historian Albert E. Elsen. The lecture series on "Law, Ethics, and the Visual Arts" led in 1979 to the publication of a casebook with the same name, which ran to five editions through 2007. Merryman was inspired to hold the lectures as a result of his wife's work as an art dealer. Merryman founded the International Journal of Cultural Property, which began publishing in 1992.

In 1985 Merryman received a Guggenheim Fellowship in the field of law.

In 1986 Merryman retired from active teaching, becoming an emeritus professor. Even after his retirement he continued to give lectures on the topic of art theft, continuing until the spring of 2015. In 2000, the Mark di Suvero sculpture The Sieve of Eratosthenes was donated to Stanford Law School in honor of Merryman's 80th birthday.

Merryman favored a global free market in art, and was known for his controversial position that the United Kingdom had a valid claim to the Elgin Marbles, which he laid out in an article in 1985.
