= Steinberg Museum of Art =

- Former names: Hillwood Art Museum, Steinberg Museum of Art at Hillwood
- Established: 1988
- Location: Brookville, New York
- Coordinates: 40.819572°N 73.598980°W
- Type: Art museum

Steinberg Museum of Art, formerly known as Steinberg Museum of Art at Hillwood and as the Hillwood Art Museum, is affiliated with the Long Island University's School of Visual and Performance Arts institution in Brookville, New York. It is located at the B. Davis Schwartz Library at the C.W. Post Campus of Long Island University.

Established in 1988 and located on the lower level of the B. Davis Schwartz Library, the museum holds temporary exhibitions year around that span from antiquity to contemporary art. The museum also has a private collection that can be publicly viewed at the Permanent Collection Gallery. The museum's activities include family days, lectures, performances and education programs for school groups. The museum is directed by Barbara Applegate, and funded by the Thaw Charitable Trust Endowment and the New York State Council on the Arts, supported by Governor Andrew Cuomo and the New York State Legislature.

In November 2017, it held its first exhibit in its new location in the B. Davis Schwartz Library, based on 'Abstract Expressionism Behind the Iron Curtain.' The museum holds over 4,000 objects in its Permanent Collection.

== History ==
In 1988, Hillwood Art Museum was created on the second floor of Hillwood Commons at LIU Post. In 2014, it was renamed to Steinberg Museum of Art at Hillwood, in homage to the university's retiring president, Dr. David J. Steinberg. In September 2016, the schools bookstore moved into its original location, which led to the reconstruction of the museum at the B. Davis Schwartz Library in April 2017.
