= Gunilla Bandolin =

Swedish sculptor (born 1954)

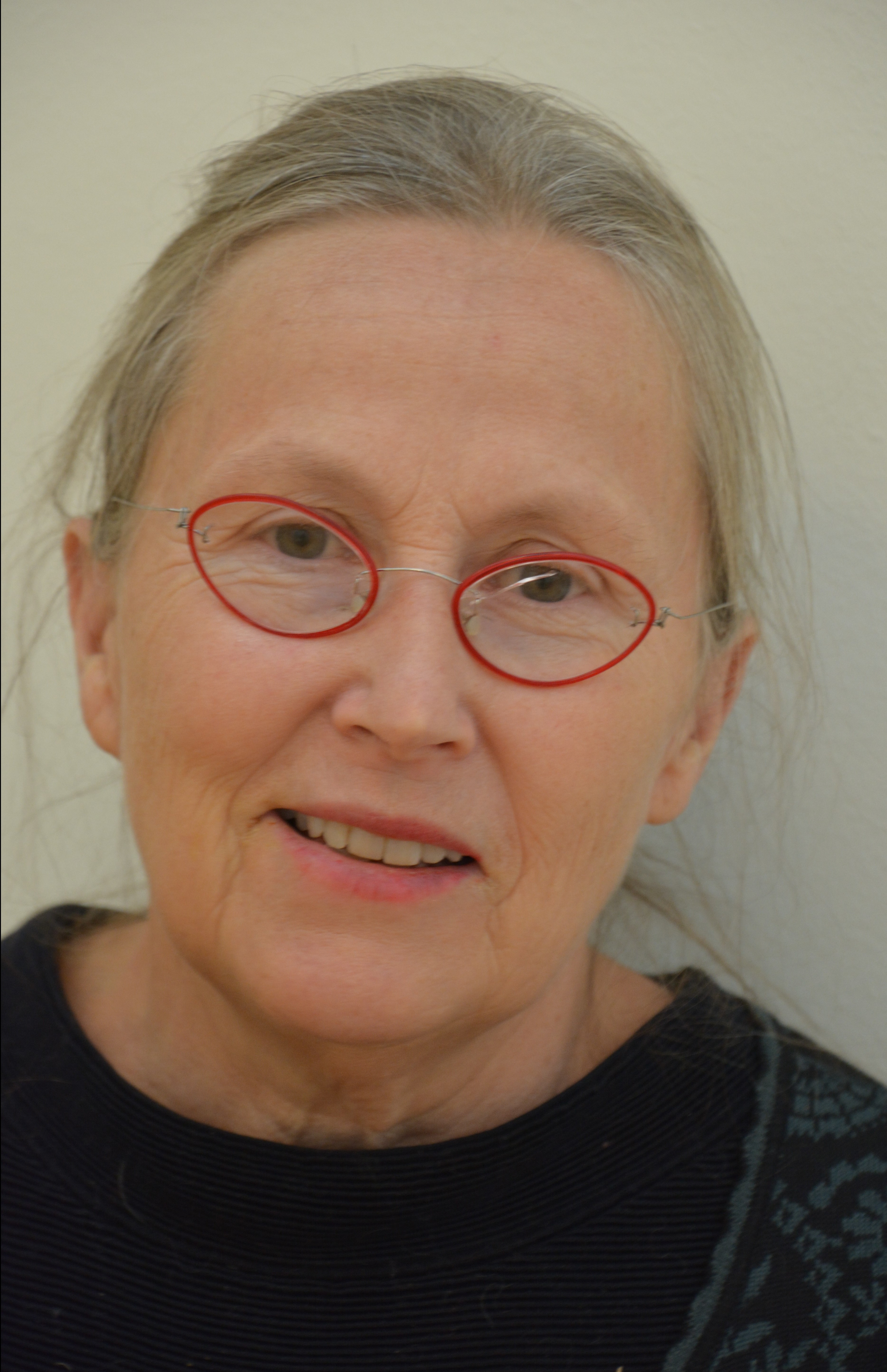
Image of Gunilla Bandolin

Carin Gunilla Bandolin (born 19 July 1954, in Köping) is a Swedish sculptor, ceramist, and landscape architect, best known for her various public art installations across Sweden. A graduate of Stockholm University, Uppsala University, Konstfack, and Karlstad University, she has been a visiting professor at KTH Royal Institute of Technology, and worked as an art critic for Dagens Nyheter and Expressen.
