= Cultural property law =

Body of law regarding culturally significant material

Cultural property law is the body of law that protects and regulates the disposition of culturally significant material, including historic real property, ancient and historic artifacts, artwork, and intangible cultural property. Cultural property can be any property, tangible or intangible, having special significance to a defined group of people, whether or not the group is vested with a traditional property interest. Cultural property laws may be international (such as international conventions or bilateral agreements) or domestic (such as federal laws or state laws).

== Major issues ==
=== Cultural property during armed conflict ===
Two major treaties have dealt with the issue of cultural heritage protection during armed conflict:

- Roerich Pact of 1935, amongst the Pan American Union
- Hague Convention for the Protection of Cultural Property in the Event of Armed Conflict of 1954, superseding the Roerich Pact.

=== Repatriation and looting ===
Repatriation issues may also apply domestically, for instance, in the United States, the 1990 Native American Graves Protection and Repatriation Act (NAGPRA)

== See also ==
- Art and culture law
- Cultural heritage
- Property law
- Treasure trove
