= Seth Siegelaub =

American curator (1941–2013)

The Artist’s Reserved Rights Transfer and Sale Agreement was conceptualized by Seth Siegelaub with the help of lawyer, Robert Projansky, and made available to the public in 1971.

Seth Siegelaub (1941, in Bronx, New York – June 15, 2013, in Basel, Switzerland) was an American-born art dealer, curator, author, and researcher. He is best known for his innovative promotion of conceptual art in New York in the 1960s and '70s, but was also a political researcher and publisher, textile history bibliographer and collector, and a researcher working on a project on time and causality in physics.

== Life ==
At his gallery, Seth Siegelaub Contemporary Art, operating between the fall of 1964 and April 1966, for one exhibition Siegelaub encouraged visitors to lounge on couches and chairs to appreciate the show as an overall environment and hosted a four-day happening featuring the artist Arni Hendin. He was an aggressive promoter and paid as much attention to press and publicity as to the content of exhibitions, showing that even unconventional artwork could be sold.

After the close of the gallery he gradually became, in Joseph Kosuth's words, a "curator-at-large". He was the first exhibition organizer to specialize in dealing with conceptual art, and artist-run publishing, holding group exhibitions that had no existence outside of the catalogue, and was an active "independent curator", organizing 21 art exhibitions, books, catalogues and projects, throughout the USA, Canada and Europe between February 1968 and July 1971 in a wide range of new and original formats, including several important group shows, such as "The Xeroxbook" in December 1968, and "January 5–31, 1969" exhibition, which contained no objects, no paintings and no sculptures.

He was also the originator and author, with lawyer Robert Projansky, of "The Artist's Reserved Rights Transfer and Sale Agreement," published in 1971, which has been translated and published in French, Italian, German and Dutch.

At the turn of the 21st century, he founded the Stichting Egress Foundation in Amsterdam to bring together his varied range of projects: contemporary art, textile history, time & causality research, and left communications study.

Siegelaub was born in the Bronx, New York, grew up in New York City, and resided in Amsterdam, the Netherlands. He died in Basel, Switzerland on June 15, 2013.

== Selected interviews ==
- "A conversation: between Seth Siegelaub and Hans Ulrich Obrist", TRANS> #6, 1999
- "Nothing Personal... An Interview with Seth Siegelaub", Interview conducted by Alice Motard and Alex Sainsbury, London, 28 November 2011, catalogue Raven Row (London)
- "The Real World: Artist Matthieu Laurette and the prolific curator, collector and dealer Seth Siegelaub discuss the legacy of Conceptual art, the origins of curating and how art history is made." FRIEZE #154, April 2013 (London)
