= Norman Zada =

American entrepreneur

Norman Zada (born Norman Askar Zadeh) is a former adjunct mathematics professor and an entrepreneur. He is the founder of Perfect 10, an adult magazine focusing on women without cosmetic surgery, and runs the United States Investing Competition. Zada is the son of Lotfi Zadeh, the creator of fuzzy logic.

== Education and early career ==
Zada obtained a PhD in Operations Research at the University of California, Berkeley and worked at IBM. He was an adjunct mathematics professor at Stanford University, Columbia University, UCLA and University of California, Irvine, writing articles on applied mathematics as well as the 2020 book Hold'em Poker Super Strategy. and the 1974 book Winning Poker Systems.

After teaching, he won both backgammon and sports handicapping championships and later became a money manager. In the 1980s he ran a number of financial competitions, including the United States Investing Championship. Zada made headlines in 1996 when he offered $400,000 for anyone successfully refuting his claim that balancing the United States federal budget over a multi-year period without an accompanying substantial trade surplus would be effectively mathematically impossible.

== Perfect 10 magazine ==
Zada launched Perfect 10 magazine, an adult magazine focusing on women without cosmetic surgery, after a friend was rejected from Playboy magazine because her proportions did not fit the magazine's tastes. He estimates losing approximately $46 million on Perfect 10 since 1996, when the magazine was first published. It has been claimed that these losses have been borne by Zada because of the deductions this allows against gains made in the money market.

His magazine was the plaintiff in Perfect 10 v. Google, Inc., a lawsuit charging contributory copyright infringement through the search engine displaying thumbnails of Perfect 10 images hosted at unauthorized third-party sites. Other lawsuits Zada filed involved adult verification system supplier Cybernet Ventures, from which he received a confidential settlement, and Visa and MasterCard, where he alleged that these credit card companies benefited from fees charged to access unauthorized material at third-party pay sites. The company also sued Giganews, Inc.

It has been claimed that Zada spends minimal time – 40 to 50 hours a year – creating content for the site, but "8 hours a day, 365 days a year" on litigation, leading some to call Perfect 10 little more than a copyright troll – by 2015, the company had filed 20 to 30 lawsuits.

== Personal life ==
Zada is the son of Lotfi A. Zadeh, a computer scientist who coined the term fuzzy logic.

Zada at one time owned a large mansion in Beverly Park that he sold in 2010 for $16.5 million.

Zada apparently uses the name "Dr. Norman Zadeh" in connection with the United States Investing Championship. In a press release for the competition issued on December 28, 2018, Zada is referred to by that name.
