= Transformative use =

Type of fair use in US copyright law

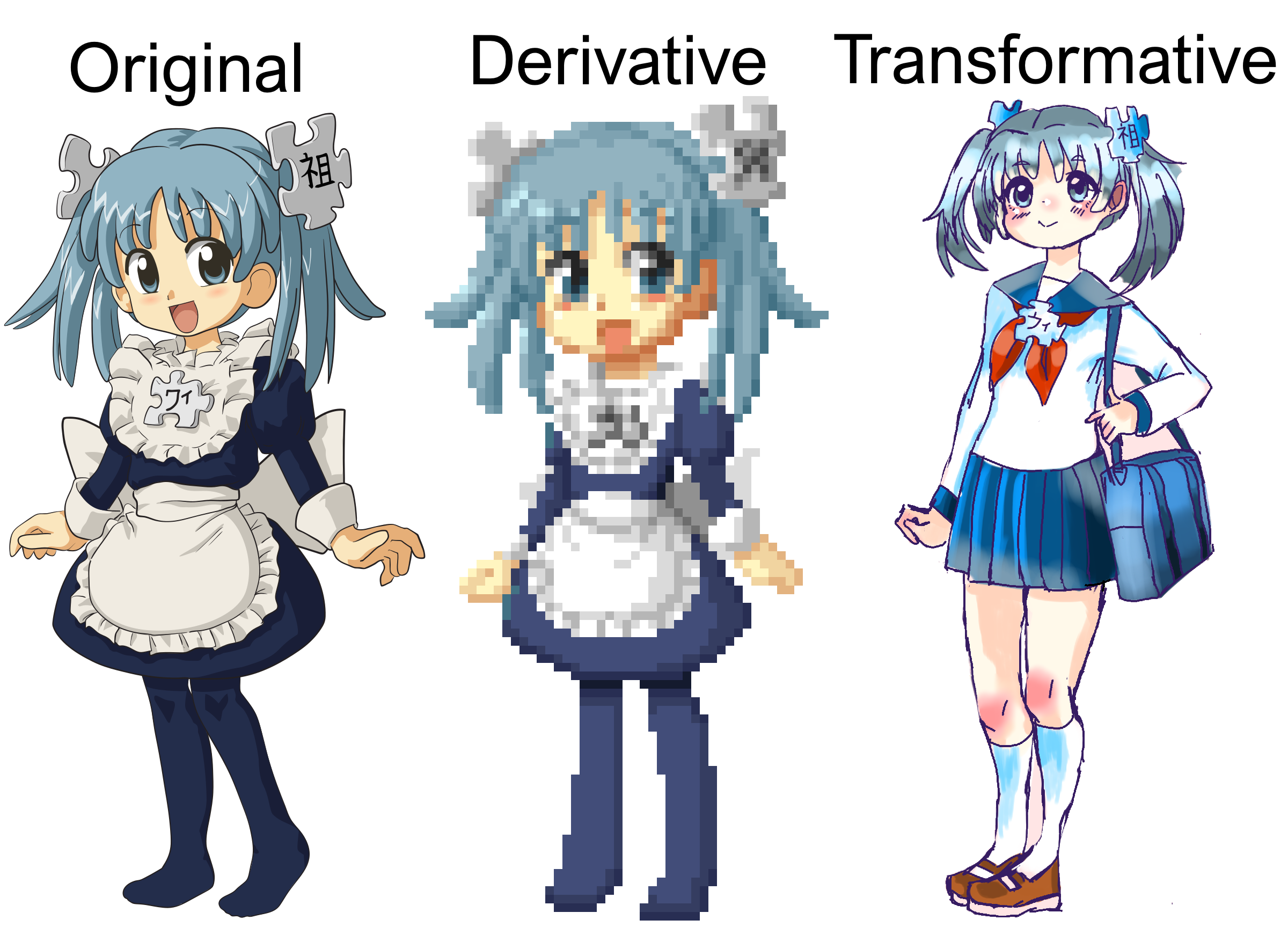
Image 1 is the original work. Image 2 is clearly based off the original work and can constitute copyright infringement. Image 3 only uses the original work as a reference to build from, creating a distinctly original image with a unique depiction and artstyle different from the original.

In United States copyright law, transformative use or transformation is a type of fair use that builds on a copyrighted work in a different manner or for a different purpose from the original, and thus does not infringe its holder's copyright. Transformation is an important issue in deciding whether a use meets the first factor of the fair use test, and is generally critical for determining whether a use is in fact fair, although no one factor is dispositive (i.e., determinative).

Transformativeness is a characteristic of such derivative works that makes them transcend, or place in a new light, the underlying works on which they are based. In computer- and Internet-related works, the transformative characteristic of the later work is often that it provides the public with a benefit not previously available to it, which would otherwise remain unavailable. Such transformativeness weighs heavily in a fair use analysis and may excuse what seems a clear copyright infringement from liability.

In United States patent law, the term also refers to a completely unrelated test, that deals with patent eligibility rather than with patent infringement. In re Bilski established that a patent-eligible invention must "transform a particular article into a different state or thing" from what has been discovered in Nature.

== Basis ==
Like most of the modern fair use doctrine, the doctrine of transformation was heavily influenced by the 1841 circuit court case Folsom v. Marsh. In that case, Justice Story ruled that

if [someone] thus cites the most important parts of the work, with a view, not to criticize, but to supersede the use of the original work, and substitute the review for it, such a use will be deemed in law a piracy.

The standard of "supersed[ing] the use of the original work" would be widely cited as a standard for the degree to which a work was transformative when fair use had become more clearly fixed as a legal principle.

In the Copyright Act of 1976, Congress defined fair use explicitly for the first time, giving as one factor "the purpose and character of the use, including whether such use is of a commercial nature or is for nonprofit educational purposes". This factor was later determined to hinge in substantial part on transformation. See, e.g., Campbell v. Acuff-Rose Music, a case in the United States Supreme Court:

Under the first of the four 107 factors, "the purpose and character of the use, including whether such use is of a commercial nature ...," the inquiry focuses on whether the new work merely supersedes the objects of the original creation, or whether and to what extent it is controversially "transformative," altering the original with new expression, meaning, or message. The more transformative the new work, the less will be the significance of other factors, like commercialism, that may weigh against a finding of fair use.

Campbell is important in large part because of this statement, ordering that commerciality should be given less weight in fair-use determinations and transformation great weight.

== Application ==
There is no "bright line test" to determine whether one work supersedes the purpose of another; like the determination of fair use generally, it involves significant judgment calls. However, there is substantial precedent that clarifies the nature of transformation in law.

A transformative parody, showing grotesque versions of Scooby-Doo, Where Are You! characters participating in tax evasion and being brutally killed by a character from Breaking Bad.

Generally, use of a work to comment on the work itself somehow will qualify as transformative. Quoting portions of a work to criticize it, as in a book review, is transformative. Likewise, parody is transformative – repurposing a work to mock the work itself or the principles the work represents serves a very different purpose from that of the original work.

Repurposing a work to aid identification of the base work is also generally transformative. In Kelly v. Arriba Soft Corp. and Perfect 10 v. Google, the respective courts held that the creation and use of thumbnails to allow users of a search engine to easily browse through images returned by their search was transformative.

Of course, as noted above, no one factor of fair use is dispositive; all must be considered. Even transformative uses can be infringing, if other factors weigh against the defendant. For example, in Rogers v. Koons transformation was not even cited as the court found the use failed to meet any of the purposes in the preamble of 17 USC § 107. However, in Blanch v. Koons it was ruled that a collage painting including a close representation of a photograph was sufficiently transformative because "compared to Blanch’s original photograph, Koons completely inverted the legs’ orientation, painting them to surreally dangle or float over the other elements of the painting. Koons also changed the coloring and added a heel to one of the feet, which had been completely obscured in Blanch's photograph."

== Examples ==
=== Campbell ===
Transformativeness is a crucial factor in current legal analysis of derivative works largely as a result of the Supreme Court's 1994 decision in Campbell v. Acuff-Rose Music, Inc. The Court's opinion emphasized the importance of transformativeness in its fair use analysis of the accused infringers' parody of "Oh, Pretty Woman," which the case involved. In parody, as the Court explained, the transformativeness is the new insight that readers, listeners, or viewers gain from the parodic treatment of the original work. As the Court pointed out, the words of the parody "derisively demonstrat[e] how bland and banal the Orbison [Pretty Woman] song" is.

=== Leval article ===
The modern emphasis of transformativeness in fair use analysis stems from a 1990 article by Judge Pierre N. Leval in the Harvard Law Review, Toward a Fair Use Standard, which the Supreme Court quoted and cited extensively in its Campbell opinion. In his article, Judge Leval explained the social importance of transformative use of another's work and what justifies such a taking:

I believe the answer to the question of justification turns primarily on whether, and to what extent, the challenged use is transformative. The use must be productive and must employ the quoted matter in a different manner or for a different purpose from the original. ...[If] the secondary use adds value to the original—if the quoted matter is used as raw material, transformed in the creation of new information, new aesthetics, new insights and understandings—this is the very type of activity that the fair use doctrine intends to protect for the enrichment of society. Transformative uses may include criticizing the quoted work, exposing the character of the original author, proving a fact, or summarizing an idea argued in the original to defend or rebut it. They also may include parody, symbolism, aesthetic declarations, and innumerable other uses.

=== Arriba Soft, Perfect 10, and Authors Guild ===
The concept of transformativeness initially developed in relation to fair use of traditional works: translations of literary works, adaptations of musical works, and changes of medium for pictorial works. But in the 21st century, courts have also applied the "in a different manner or for a different purpose" rationale in Internet and computer-related works. In such cases, as illustrated by Kelly v. Arriba Soft Corporation Perfect 10, Inc. v. Amazon.com, Inc., and Authors Guild, Inc. v. Google, Inc., the courts find a derivative-work use (such as that of thumbnails in an image search engine, for indexing purposes) or a copy of text (to facilitate key-word indexing) transformative because it provides an added benefit to the public, which was not previously available and might remain unavailable without the derivative or secondary use.

==== Ninth Circuit decisions ====
The Ninth Circuit explained this in the Perfect 10 case:

Google's use of thumbnails is highly transformative. In Kelly we concluded that Arriba's use of thumbnails was transformative because "Arriba's use of the images served a different function than Kelly's use—improving access to information on the Internet versus artistic expression." Although an image may have been created originally to serve an entertainment, aesthetic, or informative function, a search engine transforms the image into a pointer directing a user to a source of information. Just as a "parody has an obvious claim to transformative value" because "it can provide social benefit, by shedding light on an earlier work, and, in the process, creating a new one," a search engine provides social benefit by incorporating an original work into a new work, namely, an electronic reference tool. Indeed, a search engine may be more transformative than a parody because a search engine provides an entirely new use for the original work, while a parody typically has the same entertainment purpose as the original work.

Given the fact that the use was highly transformative, the court turned to the issue of striking a balance between the value to the public of the transformative use and the degree to which Google's use was commercial and superseded that of the author. It concluded that it was obliged to strike a balance:

In conducting our case-specific analysis of fair use in light of the purposes of copyright, we must weigh Google's superseding and commercial uses of thumbnail images against Google's significant transformative use, as well as the extent to which Google's search engine promotes the purposes of copyright and serves the interests of the public. Although the district court acknowledged the "truism that search engines such as Google Image Search provide great value to the public," the district court did not expressly consider whether this value outweighed the significance of Google's superseding use or the commercial nature of Google's use. The Supreme Court, however, has directed us to be mindful of the extent to which a use promotes the purposes of copyright and serves the interests of the public.

It then concluded that the public benefit had the greater weight here:

We conclude that the significantly transformative nature of Google's search engine, particularly in light of its public benefit, outweighs Google's superseding and commercial uses of the thumbnails in this case. . . . We are also mindful of the Supreme Court's direction that "the more transformative the new work, the less will be the significance of other factors, like commercialism, that may weigh against a finding of fair use.

The Ninth Circuit's treatment of transformativeness and fair use in the Arriba Soft and Perfect 10 cases illustrates different data points on the copyright infringement spectrum, at least with respect to transformativeness and fair use. Arriba Soft was a relatively polar case. The harm to Kelly, the copyright owner, was negligible; it was hardly more than his hurt feelings. Thus, the Ninth Circuit said in its opinion that "Arriba's creation and use of the thumbnails [the derivative work] does not harm the market for or value of Kelly's images." On the other hand, the court found that Arriba's use benefited the public: "Arriba's use of the images serves a different function than Kelly' s use—improving access to information on the internet versus artistic expression." The balance thus tilted strongly in Arriba's favor. This led the Ninth Circuit to be the first court to make the equation highly beneficial to public = transformative, and as the Supreme Court explained in Campbell, the more transformative a derivative use the more likely the use is to be a fair use.

The Campbell Court recognized that the balance may not always be one-sided, as it was in Campbell itself and in Arriba Soft. In the Perfect 10 case the interests were more evenly balanced, for the first time in a derivative work case involving new information technology. Both Google and Perfect 10 seemed to have legitimate interests at stake and support for their respective positions. Thus, there was a finding that "Google's wide-ranging use of thumbnails is highly transformative: their creation and display is designed to, and does, display visual search results quickly and efficiently to users of Google Image Search." But Google's use had some commercial aspects and was claimed to impair P10's commercial interests. Yet, on balance the Ninth Circuit found that the transformativeness outweighed the other fair use factors because "Google has provided a significant benefit to the public" in facilitating image searches by means of thumbnail images.

==== Second Circuit—Authors Guild ====
Still another data point is provided in the Second Circuit's 2015 decision in Authors Guild, Inc. v. Google, Inc. The court's opinion, written by Judge Pierre Leval, a highly influential scholar of fair use, explains how Google's copying entire texts, to digitalize them so that the public (users) can search for key words and see displays of snippets of the text surrounding them, "is transformative within the meaning of Campbell." He explains more specifically:

Google's making of a digital copy to provide a search function is a transformative use, which augments public knowledge by making available information about Plaintiffs' books without providing the public with a substantial substitute for matter protected by the Plaintiffs' copyright interests in the original works or derivatives of them. The same is true, at least under present conditions, of Google's provision of the snippet function.

Google's Library Project, which began in 2004, involves agreements between Google and a number of the world's major research libraries. Under these agreements, the libraries select books from their collections to submit to Google for inclusion in the project. Google makes a digital scan of each book, extracts a machine-readable text, and creates an index of the machine-readable text of each book. Since 2004, Google has scanned, rendered machine-readable, and indexed more than 20 million books, including both copyrighted works and works in the public domain. The vast majority of the books are non-fiction, and most are out of print. The digital corpus created by the scanning of these millions of books enables the Google Books search engine. Members of the public who access the Google Books website can enter search words or terms of their own choice, receiving in response a list of all books in the database in which those terms appear, as well as the number of times the term appears in each book. The court stated: "The search tool permits a researcher to identify those books, out of millions, that do, as well as those that do not, use the terms selected by the researcher. Google notes that this identifying information instantaneously supplied would otherwise not be obtainable in lifetimes of searching."

The search engine also makes possible new forms of research, known as "text mining" and "data mining." Google's "ngrams" research tool draws on the Google Library Project corpus to furnish statistical information to Internet users about the frequency of word and phrase usage over centuries. This tool permits users to discern fluctuations of interest in a particular subject over time and space by showing increases and decreases in the frequency of reference and usage in different periods and different linguistic regions. It also allows researchers to comb over the tens of millions of books Google has scanned in order to examine "word frequencies, syntactic patterns, and thematic markers" and to derive information on how nomenclature, linguistic usage, and literary style have changed over time.

The court concluded as to the search function: "We have no difficulty concluding that Google's making of a digital copy of Plaintiffs' books for the purpose of enabling a search for identification of books containing a term of interest to the searcher involves a highly transformative purpose, in the sense intended by Campbell." Downloading and storing complete digital copies of entire books was such copying as "was essential to permit searchers to identify and locate the books in which words or phrases of interest to them appeared." Therefore, the court had "no doubt that the purpose of this copying is the sort of transformative purpose described in Campbell as strongly favoring" a conclusion of fair use. Moreover, display of the snippets was essential to show the searcher enough context surrounding the searched term to permit of decision whether the passage in the book is relevant to the searcher's purpose.

The court rejected the authors' argument that Google's status as a commercial enterprise disqualified its claim of fair use:

[W]e see no reason in this case why Google's overall profit motivation should prevail as a reason for denying fair use over its highly convincing transformative purpose, together with the absence of significant substitutive competition, as reasons for granting fair use. Many of the most universally accepted forms of fair use, such as news reporting and commentary, quotation in historical or analytic books, reviews of books, and performances, as well as parody, are all normally [40] done commercially for profit.

Google made an unauthorized digital copy of the entire book, but it did not reveal that digital copy to the public. The copy in Google's files was made available to the public only to enable the search functions to reveal limited, important information about the books. Therefore, the court said, "not only is the copying of the totality of the original reasonably appropriate to Google's transformative purpose, it is literally necessary to achieve that purpose." The reason is that if "Google copied less than the totality of the originals, its search function could not advise searchers reliably whether their searched term appears in a book."

The ability to users to obtain snippets of a book by using the search function did not create a market substitute for the original book, thereby depriving the author of her market:

Snippet view, at best and after a large commitment of manpower, produces discontinuous, tiny fragments, amounting in the aggregate to no more than 16% of a book. This does not threaten the rights holders with any significant harm to the value of their copyrights or diminish their harvest of copyright revenue.

The court summarized its analysis of transformativeness by concluding:

In sum, we conclude that . . . Google's unauthorized digitizing of copyright-protected works, creation of a search functionality, and display of snippets from those works are non-infringing fair uses. The purpose of the copying is highly transformative, the public display of text is limited, and the revelations do not provide a significant market substitute for the protected aspects of the originals. Google's commercial nature and profit motivation do not justify denial of fair use.

Screenshot of Half.com pop-up ad over Amazon's Web page

=== Pop-ups ===
The use of pop-up advertising, in which third-party advertisements pop up on a competitor's Web page and change its appearance to create a derivative work, may present more difficult transformativeness issues. On the one hand, the pop-ups provide the public with additional information about making buying decisions (particularly in the form of price comparisons). On the other hand, they adversely affect the Web page proprietor's interest in the integrity of its Web page and its investment interest in creating and maintaining the page. No court has yet addressed derivative work copyright considerations in terms of how to strike a balance between the competing interests at stake, here, although several courts have found no copyright infringement liability for one reason or another.

=== Photos of sculptures ===
On February 25, 2010, the United States Court of Appeals for the Federal Circuit ruled 2–1 that sculptor Frank Gaylord, sculptor of a portion of the Korean War Veterans Memorial, was entitled to compensation when an image of the memorial was used on a 37-cent postage stamp, because he had not signed away his intellectual property rights to the sculpture when it was erected. The appeals court rejected arguments that the photo was transformative.

In 2002 amateur photographer and retired Marine John All was paid $1,500 to use a photograph of his of the memorial on a snowy day for the stamp. More than $17 million worth of the stamps were sold. In 2006, Gaylord retained Fish & Richardson as pro bono counsel to make a claim that the Postal Service had violated his Intellectual property rights to the sculpture and he should be compensated. The Postal Service argued that Gaylord was not the sole sculptor (saying he had received advice from federal sources—who recommended that the uniforms appear more in the wind) and also that the sculpture was actually architecture. Gaylord won all of his arguments in the lower court except for one—the court ruled that the photo was fair use and thus Gaylord was not entitled to compensation. Gaylord appealed and won. The case could have been appealed to the United States Supreme Court or damages can be assessed by the lower court but on April 22, 2011, The US Court of Claims awarded Gaylord $5,000.

== See also ==
- Appropriation art
- Artificial intelligence and copyright
- Organization for Transformative Works
- Legal issues with fan fiction
