= Seltzer v. Green Day, Inc. =

2013 US copyright lawsuit

- Court: United States Court of Appeals for the Ninth Circuit
- Full case name: Derek Seltzer v. Green Day, Inc., Green Day Touring, Inc., Green Day, Warner Bros. Records, Inc., Infection Productions, Performance Environmental Design
- Argued: February 5, 2013
- Decided: August 7, 2013
- Citation: 725 F.3d 1170

Case history
- Prior history: Seltzer v. Green Day, Inc., 2011 U.S. Dist. LEXIS 134388 (C.D. Cal., Nov. 17, 2011) Seltzer v. Green Day, Inc., 2011 U.S. Dist. LEXIS 92393 (C.D. Cal., Aug. 18, 2011)

Holding
- Grant of summary judgment affirmed; award of attorneys fees vacated.

Court membership
- Judges sitting: Diarmuid F. O'Scannlain, Stephen S. Trott, Richard R. Clifton

Laws applied
- 17 U.S.C. § 107

Seltzer v. Green Day, Inc. 725 F.3d 1170 (9th Cir. 2013) is a copyright lawsuit where the court determined if Green Day's unauthorized use of the Scream Icon illustration in the video backdrop of a stage show was fair use.

== Background ==
Artist Derek Seltzer created an illustration of a screaming contorted face, called the Scream Icon in 2003 and created copies on posters and print which he sold and gave away. The posters were plaster all over walls in Los Angeles as street art. Seltzer used the Scream Icon to identify his work in advertisements for his art galleries and licensed it for use in music videos.

In 2008 Roger Staub photographed a brick wall at the corner of Sunset Boulevard and Gardner Avenue in Los Angeles covered with Scream Icon posters covered with graffiti. The band Green Day hired Performance Environment Design to design their pyrotechnics, backdrop and lighting for concerts in 2009 in preparation for the release of their new music album 21st Century Breakdown. Staub was hired to create a backdrop for the new album. He listened to each song and arranged the visual elements for the backdrops.

One of the songs titled "East Jesus Nowhere" Staub used the photograph of the brick wall with a weathered Scream Icon image with a red cross over it and a change in contrast and color. The backdrop was based on Staub's interpretation of the theme of the song which was the hypocrisy of some religious people who preach one thing but act otherwise. The backdrop was used in 70 Green Day concerts from July 3, 2009, through November 12, 2009, and their performance at the MTV Video Music Awards on September 13, 2009.

Seltzer became aware that Green Day was using his art at their concerts without authorization and emailed the band on September 24, 2009, to work out a resolution. There was no resolution, so Seltzer filed for copyright of the Scream Icon on November 19, 2009, and his attorney sent Green Day a cease and desist, which they complied with. In March 2010 Seltzer filed a complaint on violations of the Lanham Act, copyright infringement, and various state law claims. Green Day followed the filing with a movement for summary judgment based on fair use under 17 U.S.C. § 107. The district court found Seltzer's claims unreasonable and granted the summary judgement awarding Green Day $201,012.50. Seltzer appealed the judgement.

== Opinion ==
Diarmuid F. O'Scannlain wrote the majority opinion. In determining if a work is fair use the court considers the following factors under 17 U.S.C. § 107:

1. The purpose and character of the use, including whether such use is of a commercial nature or is for nonprofit educational purposes
2. The nature of the copyrighted work
3. The amount and substantiality of the portion used in relation to the copyrighted work as a whole
4. the effect of the use upon the potential market for or value of the copyrighted work.

For the first factor, the Court argues that Green Day's use of Scream Icon is transformative, using the original as raw material for constructing the backdrop. The use was not a quotation or a republication, the backdrop was a street-art focused music video about religion, where the Scream Icon was a component. The original Scream Icon had a different theme than the backdrop, being the hypocrisy of religion. The modifications such as red cross over the image and the change in theme was distinct from the original piece. For the commercial nature aspect of the first factor the Court argues that the commercial use was incidental, the band never used the image to sell merchandise, CDs, or concerts, weighing the first factor in support of fair use.

For the second factor the court examined the extent to which the Scream Icon was published. The Scream Icon was widely disseminated, prior to its use in Green Day's concert. Furthermore, Seltzer had controlled "first public appearance" of his work, making this factor weigh in favor of Fair use.

The third factor looked at the quantitative amount and qualitative value of the original work in relation to its use. The court found that it was necessary for Green Day to use the entire work for new message, expression or meaning. This factor did not weigh against Green Day.

The fourth factor looked at the potential market for or value of the copyrighted work. Seltzer testified at his deposition that "the value of his work was unchanged" and that no one claimed that they would not buy his work because of Green Day's use. This factor was in favor of fair use.

With three out of four factors in favor of Green Day, the Court affirmed the summary judgement, but vacated district court's award of attorneys' fees claiming that plaintiff did not act objectively unreasonably.
