= Perfect 10 (magazine) =

US magazine

- Cover of Fall 1997 issue
- Editor: Norm Zada
- Categories: Men's magazine
- Frequency: Quarterly
- Founded: 1997
- Final issue: 2007 (print)
- Country: USA
- Language: English
- Website: www.perfect10.com
- ISSN: 1094-3927

Perfect 10 was a monthly men's magazine (later a quarterly), and adult website that featured high resolution topless or nude photographs of women who had not had cosmetic surgery. Perfect 10 also promoted and filmed boxing matches between a number of their models, which were called Perfect 10: Model Boxing on the Showtime and HDNet cable channels. The last print edition of the magazine was published in the summer of 2007 (issue 43), after which it switched to a subscription-based website-only presentation.

== History ==
Perfect 10 was founded by former computer science professor, championship poker player, and hedge fund manager Norm Zadeh (now Zada) in the late 1990s when a friend was rejected from Playboy because she was not well-endowed.

== Lawsuits ==
It has been claimed that owner Zada spent minimal time (40 to 50 hours a year) creating content for the site, but "8 hours a day, 365 days a year" on litigation, leading some to call Perfect10 little more than a copyright troll – by 2015, the company had filed 20 to 30 lawsuits.

=== Perfect 10 v. Google, Inc. ===
In August 2005, Perfect 10 filed suit with the U.S. District Court in Los Angeles to stop Google and Amazon from caching and displaying thumbnails to third party sites which offer unlicensed images from Perfect 10, arguing that this interfered with their cell-phone thumbnail offer. In February 2006 the court granted the request in part and denied it in part, ruling that the thumbnails were infringing but links sites with images were not. In appeal, the Ninth Circuit Court of Appeals ruled almost entirely in favor of Google in Perfect 10, Inc. v. Amazon.com, Inc.. The court ruled that Google's use of images was transformative and thus did not infringe Perfect 10's copyright.

=== Perfect 10, Inc. v. CCBill LLC ===
In 2006, Perfect 10 filed suit with United States District Court in California against CCBill for "violat[ing] copyright, trademark, and state unfair competition, false advertising and right of publicity laws by providing services to websites that posted images stolen from Perfect 10's magazine and website".

=== Perfect 10, Inc. v. Megaupload Limited ===
In January 2011, Perfect 10 again filed suit with the U.S. District Court in Los Angeles, demanding $5m in damages from Megaupload Limited (and its CEO, Kim Schmitz) for copyright infringement.

=== Perfect 10, Inc. v. Giganews, Inc. ===
In April 2011, Perfect 10 sued Giganews, a prominent usenet provider, for both direct and indirect infringement. Giganews prevailed on all grounds, and in March 2015 Perfect 10 was ordered to pay Giganews $5,213,117.06 in attorney's fees and $424,235.47 in costs. In January 2017 the Court of Appeals for the Ninth Circuit affirmed the original judgement.
