= Teach =

Teach may refer to:

== People ==
- Blackbeard, English pirate Edward Teach (c. 1680–1718)
- nickname of Earl Caldwell (1905–1981), American Major League Baseball pitcher
- nickname of Eleanor Tennant (1895–1974), American tennis player and coach, first female professional player

== Other uses ==
- Teach (or Tigh), an Irish language term referring to a home or residence
- Teach: Tony Danza, a reality show on A&E
- TEACH Act (Technology, Education and Copyright Harmonization Act), a 2002 American federal copyright act
- Education

== See also ==
- Teacher (disambiguation)
