= Derivative work =

Concept in copyright law

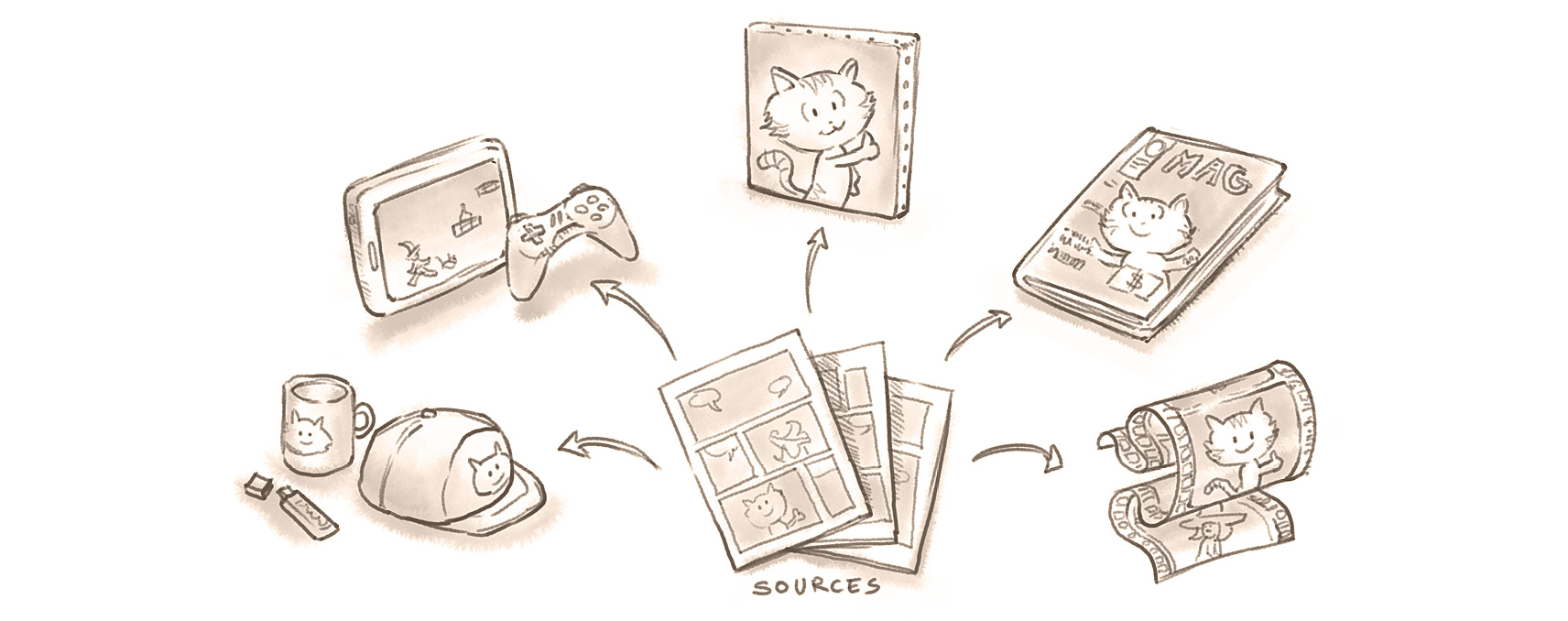
A work can be the source to many different types of derivative works that differ in type from the original. In this illustration, a comic book is the source to merchandise, a video game, a magazine and a film.

Marcel Duchamp's 1919 piece L.H.O.O.Q., a derivative work based on the Mona Lisa

In copyright law, a derivative work is an expressive creation that includes major copyrightable elements of a first, previously created original work (the underlying work). The derivative work becomes a second, separate work independent from the first. The transformation, modification or adaptation of the work must be substantial and bear its author's personality sufficiently to be original and thus protected by copyright. Translations, cinematic adaptations and musical arrangements are common types of derivative works.

Most countries' legal systems seek to protect both original and derivative works. They grant authors the right to impede or otherwise control their integrity and the author's commercial interests. Derivative works and their authors benefit in turn from the full protection of copyright without prejudicing the rights of the original work's author.

== Definition ==
=== Berne ===
The Berne Convention for the Protection of Literary and Artistic Works, an international copyright treaty, stipulates that derivative works shall be protected although it does not use the term, namely that "Translations, adaptations, arrangements of music and other alterations of a literary or artistic work shall be protected as original works without prejudice to the copyright in the original work".

=== United States ===
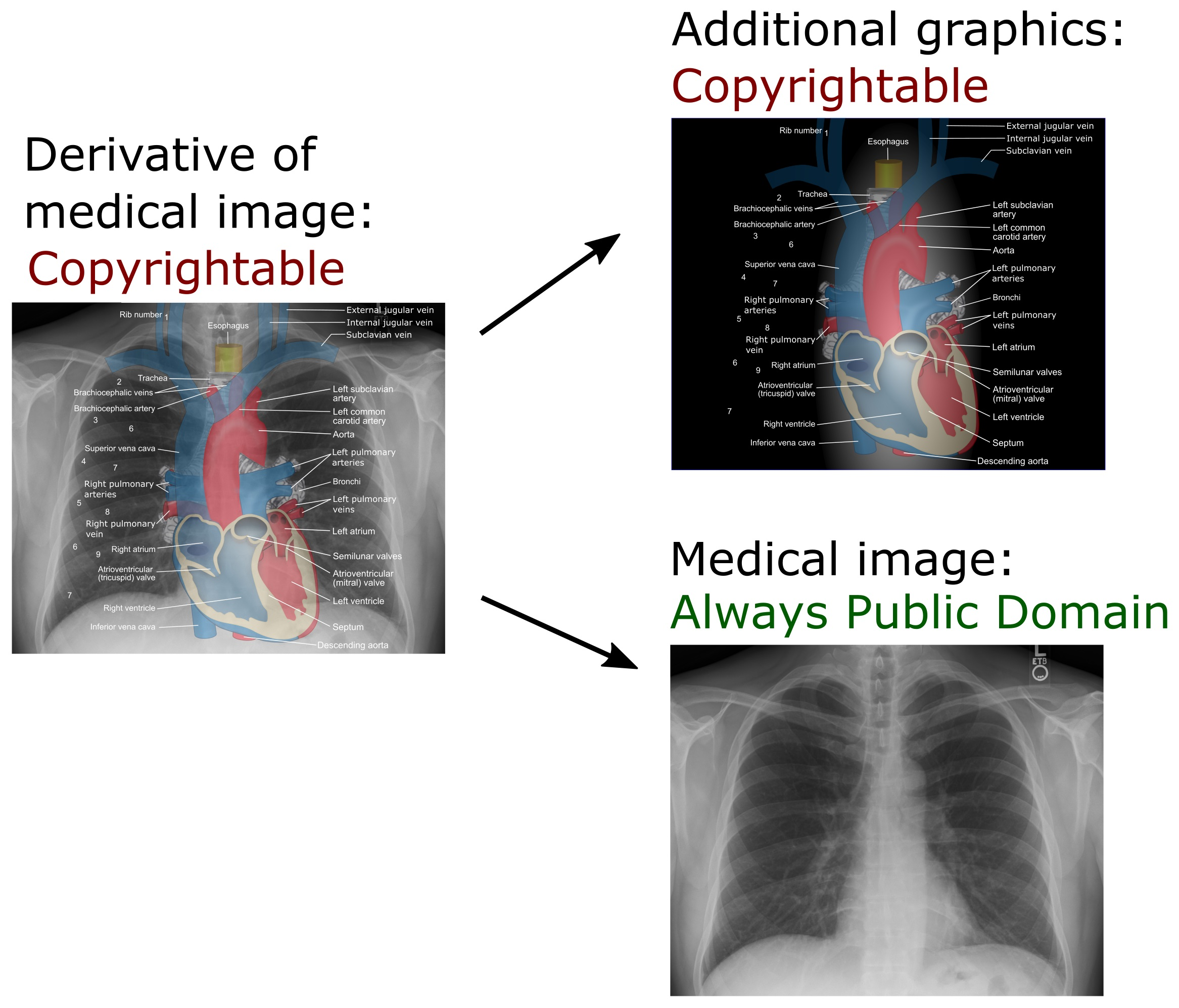
In U.S. law, this derivative work of a chest radiograph (which is in the public domain) is copyrightable because of the additional graphics. Yet the chest radiograph component of the work is still in the public domain.

An extensive definition of the term is given by the United States Copyright Act in 17 U.S.C. § 101:

A "derivative work" is a work based upon one or more preexisting works, such as a translation, musical arrangement, dramatization, fictionalization, motion picture version, sound recording, art reproduction, abridgment, condensation, or any other form in which a work may be recast, transformed, or adapted. A work consisting of editorial revisions, annotations, elaborations, or other modifications which, as a whole, represent an original work of authorship, is a "derivative work".

17 U.S.C. § 103(b) provides:

The copyright in a compilation or derivative work extends only to the material contributed by the author of such work, as distinguished from the preexisting material employed in the work, and does not imply any exclusive right in the preexisting material. The copyright in such work is independent of, and does not affect or enlarge the scope, duration, ownership, or subsistence of, any copyright protection in the preexisting material.

17 U.S.C. § 106 provides:

Subject to sections 107 through 122, the owner of copyright under this title has the exclusive rights to do and to authorize any of the following:

(1) to reproduce the copyrighted work in copies...;

(2) to prepare derivative works based upon the copyrighted work;

(3) to distribute copies...of the copyrighted work to the public by sale or other transfer of ownership, or by rental, lease, or lending....

US Copyright Office Circular 14: Derivative Works notes that:

A typical example of a derivative work received for registration in the Copyright Office is one that is primarily a new work but incorporates some previously published material. This previously published material makes the work a derivative work under the copyright law. To be copyrightable, a derivative work must be different enough from the original to be regarded as a "new work" or must contain a substantial amount of new material. Making minor changes or additions of little substance to a preexisting work will not qualify the work as a new version for copyright purposes. The new material must be original and copyrightable in itself. Titles, short phrases, and format, for example, are not copyrightable.

The statutory definition is incomplete and the concept of derivative work must be understood with reference to explanatory case law. Three major copyright law issues arise concerning derivative works: (1) what acts are sufficient to cause a copyright-protected derivative work to come into existence; (2) what acts constitute copyright infringement of a copyright in a copyright-protected work; and (3) in what circumstances is a person otherwise liable for infringement of copyright in a copyright-protected derivative work excused from liability by an affirmative defense, such as first sale or fair use?

=== European Union ===
French law prefers the term "œuvre composite" ("composite work") although the term '"œuvre dérivée" is sometimes used. It is defined in article L 113–2, paragraph 2 of the Intellectual Property Code as "new works into which pre-existing work [is incorporated], without the collaboration of its author". The Court of Cassation has interpreted this statute as requiring two distinct inputs at different points in time.

The Court of Justice of the European Union in 2010 decided on a matter of derivative works in Systran v. European Commission (Case T‑19/07). However, it was overturned in 2013 based on the conclusion that the case did not fall within the General Court's jurisdiction, after concluding that the dispute had been of a contractual nature, instead of a non-contractual one.

=== Canada ===
Though Canadian copyright law does not explicitly define "derivative work", the Copyright Act of Canada does provide the following generally agreed-upon examples of what constitutes a derivative work in section 3:

"copyright"...includes the sole right

(a) to produce, reproduce, perform or publish any translation of the work,

(b) in the case of a dramatic work, to convert it into a novel or other non-dramatic work,

(c) in the case of a novel or other non-dramatic work, or of an artistic work, to convert it into a dramatic work, by way of performance in public or otherwise,

(d) in the case of a literary, dramatic or musical work, to make any sound recording, cinematograph film or other contrivance by means of which the work may be mechanically reproduced or performed,

(e) in the case of any literary, dramatic, musical or artistic work, to reproduce, adapt and publicly present the work as a cinematographic work

In Théberge v. Galerie d'Art du Petit Champlain Inc., [2002] 2 S.C.R. 336, 2002 SCC 34, the Supreme Court of Canada clarified the statutory recognition of derivative works extended only to circumstances where there was production and multiplication, i.e. reproduction. Where there is no derivation, reproduction, or production of a new and original work which incorporates the artist's work, there is no violation of the Copyright Act.

== Significance, history and social context ==
Derivative works represent the majority of the human cultural, scientific and technological heritage, as exemplified by the proverb about "standing on the shoulders of giants." The number of derivative works has been adversely impacted by the introduction of the copyright law, which made them illegal in numerous circumstances, and positively by the spread of the copyleft ethos in the late 20th and early 21st century.

The term derivative work was coined during the copyright law revision process in the United States that culminated in the Copyright Act of 1976. It was needed to simplify the language used in the prior copyright statute, which enumerated the types of adaptations of pre-existing works that could be copyrighted as new works.

== Application of derivative-work copyright ==
=== Originality requirement ===
For copyright protection to attach to a later, allegedly derivative work, it must display some originality of its own. It cannot be a rote, uncreative variation on the earlier, underlying work. The latter work must contain sufficient new expression, over and above that embodied in the earlier work for the latter work to satisfy copyright law's requirement of originality.

Although serious emphasis on originality, at least so designated, began with the Supreme Court's 1991 decision in Feist v. Rural, some pre-Feist lower court decisions addressed this requirement in relation to derivative works. In Durham Industries, Inc. v. Tomy Corp. and earlier in L. Batlin & Son, Inc. v. Snyder. the Second Circuit held that a derivative work must be original relative to the underlying work on which it is based. Otherwise, it cannot enjoy copyright protection and copying it will not infringe any copyright of the derivative work itself (although copying it may infringe the copyright, if any, of the underlying work on which the derivative work was based).

The Batlin case rested on the copyrightability of an "Uncle Sam" toy bank, first copyrighted in 1886. These toys have Uncle Sam's extended arm and outstretched hand adapted to receive a coin; when the user presses a lever, Uncle Sam appears to put the coin into a carpet bag. One maker of these banks, Jeffrey Snyder, had filed a copyright on such a bank in 1975, planning to import them for the American Bicentennial. Shortly thereafter, another company, L. Batlin & Sons, Inc., also began making a very similar toy bank which was based on Snyder's version (and not, incidentally, on the 19th century original). When the latter attempted to import the toy banks, the US Customs service notified them that they appeared to be infringing on Snyder's copyright, and would not allow the toy banks to be imported. Batlin then got an injunction against Snyder to deny the recording of his copyright and allowing them to import their banks. On appeal to the Second Circuit Court, Snyder took great pains to demonstrate how his banks varied in size and shape from the 19th century original, arguing that his banks, though similar to the older work, differed in a number of significant ways and warranted protection under a new copyright. However, his appeal was denied and the injunction against Snyder's copyright upheld (six members of the court voted to deny, the other three filing a dissenting opinion). Much of this decision focused on the fact that nearly all of the alterations in Snyder's version were made solely to allow the object to be more easily manufactured in plastic rather than metal, and therefore were functional, not artistic or creative. "To extend copyrightability to minuscule variations would simply put a weapon for harassment in the hands of mischievous copiers intent on appropriating and monopolizing public domain work." The issue was not whether or not Batlin's bank was a copy of Snyder's— it undoubtedly was— but whether or not Snyder could claim copyright protection, which the court decided he could not.

In the subsequent Durham case, the court applied the same principle in a suit between two different Disney toy licensees in which one licensee claimed that the other had pirated his Mickey Mouse, Donald Duck and Pluto. Durham conceded that in making these toys it used Tomy's Disney figures as models. That was not determinative. The court said that "the only aspects of Tomy's Disney figures entitled to copyright protection are the non-trivial, original features, if any, contributed by the author or creator of these derivative works." But Tomy's toys reflected "no independent creation, no distinguishable variation from preexisting works, nothing recognizably the author's own contribution that sets Tomy's figures apart from the prototypical Mickey, Donald, and Pluto, authored by Disney and subsequently represented by Disney or its licensees in a seemingly limitless variety of forms and media." Because the court considered that "it is clear that the originality requirement imposed by the Constitution and the Copyright Act has particular significance in the case of derivative works based on copyrighted preexisting works," it denied relief and dismissed the claim. Thus the law is clear that a derivative work is protectable only to the extent that it embodies original expression. Its non-original aspects are not copyright-protectable (what is loosely called "uncopyrightable").

In both of these cases, the defendants were held not to be liable for copyright infringement, even though they presumably copied a considerable amount from the plaintiff's work. They were not liable because the plaintiff did not enjoy copyright protection. The plaintiffs' works lacked enough originality to acquire copyright protection of their own. They were too close to the original works on which they were based.

=== Lawful works requirement ===
Under United States copyright law, copyright ownership in a derivative work attaches only if the derivative work is lawful, because of a license or other "authorization." The U.S. Copyright Office says in its circular on derivative works:

In any case where a copyrighted work is used without the permission of the copyright owner, copyright protection will not extend to any part of the work in which such material has been used unlawfully.

The courts have so far addressed little attention to the issue of lawful (i.e., non-infringing) use without authorization, as in fair use cases such as the Pretty Woman case. Recently, however, in Keeling v. Hars, the Second Circuit held that, if the creator of an unauthorized work stays within the bounds of fair use and adds sufficient original content, the original contributions in such an unauthorized derivative work are protectable under the Copyright Act. In that case, the plaintiff created a parody stage adaptation of a motion picture, without authorization.

On the other hand, the Berne Convention and the copyright laws of Commonwealth countries do not deny copyright to derivative works (such as translations and abridgements) that are themselves infringing. Thus, the author of an infringing derivative work could sue to stop a third-party infringer from copying their work, while the owner of a source work could sue both the author of the derivative work and a third party who copies the derivative work without either copyright owner's authorization.

== Liability of derivative-work ==
This issue sometimes arises in the context of the defendant purchasing a copy of a picture or some other work from the copyright owner or a licensee and then reselling it in different context. For example, pictures from greeting cards might be affixed to tiles or one kind of textile product might be turned into another that can be sold at a higher price. In Lee v. A.R.T. Co., (the Annie Lee case), the defendant affixed the copyright owner's copyright-protected note cards and small lithographs to tiles and then resold them. The original art was not changed or reproduced, only bonded to ceramic and sold. The court held that this act was not original and creative enough to rise to the level of creating a derivative work, but effectively similar to any other form of display or art frame.

Distribution rights differ from reproduction rights. While the first-sale doctrine entitles the copyright holder to begin the distribution chain of a copyrighted work - by selling note cards, for instance, or giving them away - it does not permit the copyright holder to control what is done with the item after it is distributed. Unless there is a separate contract between the parties, the person who owns the object has the right to give it away or resell it themself. In the case of Lee v. A.R.T., since bonding the cards to ceramic did not create a derivative work, A.R.T. Co. was legally within their rights to resell the cards in such a fashion.

When the defendant's modification of the plaintiff's work is de minimis, too insubstantial to "count", there is no infringing preparation of a derivative work. So long as there is no derivative work, there is no infringement—since no conduct that the Copyright Act forbids has occurred.

=== Fixation requirement ===
In a House Report, Congress said:

The exclusive right to prepare derivative works, specified separately in clause (2) of section 106, overlaps the exclusive right of reproduction to some extent. It is broader than that right, however, in the sense that reproduction requires fixation in copies or phonorecords, whereas the preparation of a derivative work, such as a ballet, pantomime, or improvised performance, may be an infringement even though nothing is ever fixed in tangible form.

The 9th Circuit, however, has resisted this expansive view of liability for derivative works by imposing its own quasi-fixation requirement. In Micro Star v. FormGen Inc. Judge Kozinski wrote:

To narrow the statute to a manageable level, we have developed certain criteria a work must satisfy in order to qualify as a derivative work. One of these is that a derivative work must exist in a "concrete or permanent form,"....The requirement that a derivative work must assume a concrete or permanent form was recognized without much discussion in Galoob.

=== Mere preparation ===
The statutory language of the United States Copyright Act of 1976 suggests that "mere preparation of a derivative work" without disseminating it to the public might infringe copyright, as the act provides copyright owners with the exclusive right "to prepare derivative works based on [a] copyrighted work" (17 U.S.C. § 106(2)). In practice, court cases tend to focus on the unlicensed dissemination of derivative works by alleged infringers, particularly commercial exploitation.

The issue of whether unpublished derivative works infringe the copyright owner's derivative work right has been addressed in a few court cases. In Anderson v. Stallone (1989), the court held that Timothy Anderson's Rocky IV treatment infringed the copyright in Sylvester Stallone's prior Rocky movies, even though the treatment had not been published or commercially exploited. The case did not address the question of fair use. On the other hand, the court in Chapman v. Maraj (2020) found that Nicki Minaj's sampling of Tracy Chapman's song "Baby Can I Hold You" in an unpublished derivative work was fair use, as Minaj had prepared the derivative work for the purpose of seeking a license to use the underlying material, and did not intend to release the work after permission was denied. The court observed that experimenting with copyrighted material before clearing the rights to it is a common practice in the music industry; copyright owners often ask to see a sample of the derivative work before approving its use. The court wrote: "A ruling uprooting these common practices would limit creativity and stifle innovation within the music industry. This is contrary to Copyright Law's primary goal of promoting the arts for the public good."

== The fair use defense in derivative work cases ==
Even if a work is found to be an unauthorized derivative work, an alleged infringer can escape liability via the defense of fair use. For example, in Campbell v. Acuff-Rose Music, Inc., the Supreme Court found that although a parody of the song "Oh, Pretty Woman" by 2 Live Crew was an unauthorized derivative work, fair use was still available as a complete defense. This case marked the Supreme Court's pointing to transformativeness as a major clue to application of the fair use defense to derivative works.

The defense of fair use has become very important in computer- and Internet-related works. Two 1992 Ninth Circuit decisions are illustrative.

In Lewis Galoob Toys, Inc. v. Nintendo of America, Inc., the appellate court held that it was a fair use for owners of copies of video games, such as Super Mario Bros., to use Galoob's product the Game Genie to customize the difficulty or other characteristics of the game by granting a character more strength, speed, or endurance. Nintendo strongly opposed Galoob's product, allegedly because it interfered with the maintenance of the "Nintendo Culture," which Nintendo claimed was important to its marketing program. The court held, among other things, that the fair use defense shielded Galoob's conduct. The court said that "a party who distributes a copyrighted work cannot dictate how that work is to be enjoyed. Consumers may use ... a Game Genie to enhance a Nintendo Game cartridge's audiovisual display in such a way as to make the experience more enjoyable."

In Sega Enterprises, Ltd. v. Accolade, Inc., the court excused Accolade from copyright infringement liability on fair use grounds. Nintendo and Sega produced video game consoles. Each stored the games in plastic cartridges that provided game data to the consoles. By way of analogy, the Sega hardware console's "platform" differed from Nintendo's, as a Macintosh platform differs from that of a PC. Hence, a video game cartridge that works on one system does not work on the other. Sega and Nintendo sought to "license" access to their hardware platforms, and each company developed software "locks" to keep out cartridges that did not have the proper "key." Accolade sought a license from Sega for its key, but negotiations broke down over price. Accolade then decided to reverse engineer Sega's lock and key system. To do so, it had to download (copy) all of the computer code from Sega's product and disassemble it (translate it from machine code into human-readable assembly). Accolade succeeded and began to market new video games that it independently wrote, which were capable of being operated in Sega consoles. This led to copyright infringement litigation, in which Sega alleged that the downloading was improper copying (reproduction) of Sega's code. The court held that Sega was trying to use the copyright in its computer code to maintain a monopoly over the sale of video games, to which it was not legally entitled. Accolade downloaded the computer code only to ascertain how the lock worked, so that it could make a key that would permit its games to work in Sega consoles. The court held that such a use was fair use: "We conclude that where disassembly is the only way to gain access to the ideas and functional elements embodied in a copyrighted computer program and where there is a legitimate reason for seeking such access, disassembly is a fair use of the copyrighted work, as a matter of law." However, since the passage of the anti-circumvention statutes contained in the DMCA, further court cases involving the fair-use defense of such activities have yet to be actually litigated.

=== Transformativeness ===
A crucial factor in current legal analysis of derivative works is transformativeness, largely as a result of the Supreme Court's 1994 decision in Campbell v. Acuff-Rose Music, Inc. The Court's opinion emphasized the importance of transformativeness in its fair use analysis of the parody of "Oh, Pretty Woman" involved in the Campbell case. In parody, as the Court explained, the transformativeness is the new insight that readers, listeners, or viewers gain from the parodic treatment of the original work. As the Court pointed out, the words of the parody "derisively demonstrat[e] how bland and banal the Orbison [Pretty Woman] song" is.

The modern emphasis of transformativeness in fair use analysis stems from a 1990 article by Judge Pierre N. Leval in the Harvard Law Review, "Toward a Fair Use Standard", which the Court quoted and cited extensively in its Campbell opinion. In his article, Leval explained the social importance of transformative use of another's work and what justifies such a taking:

I believe the answer to the question of justification turns primarily on whether, and to what extent, the challenged use is transformative. The use must be productive and must employ the quoted matter in a different manner or for a different purpose from the original. ...[If] the secondary use adds value to the original--if the quoted matter is used as raw material, transformed in the creation of new information, new aesthetics, new insights and understandings--this is the very type of activity that the fair use doctrine intends to protect for the enrichment of society.

Transformative uses may include criticizing the quoted work, exposing the character of the original author, proving a fact, or summarizing an idea argued in the original in order to defend or rebut it. They also may include parody, symbolism, aesthetic declarations, and innumerable other uses.

The concept, as Leval and the Campbell Court described it, developed in relation to fair use of traditional works: literary works, musical works, and pictorial works. But recently courts have extended this rationale to Internet and computer-related works. In such cases, as illustrated by Kelly v. Arriba Soft Corporation and Perfect 10, Inc. v. Amazon.com, Inc., the courts find a use (such as that of thumbnails in an image search engine, for indexing purposes) transformative because it provides an added benefit to the public, which was not previously available and might remain unavailable without the derivative or secondary use. The Ninth Circuit Court explained this in the Perfect 10 case:

Google's use of thumbnails is highly transformative. In Kelly we concluded that Arriba's use of thumbnails was transformative because "Arriba's use of the images served a different function than Kelly's use — improving access to information on the Internet versus artistic expression." Although an image may have been created originally to serve an entertainment, aesthetic, or informative function, a search engine transforms the image into a pointer directing a user to a source of information. Just as a "parody has an obvious claim to transformative value" because "it can provide social benefit, by shedding light on an earlier work, and, in the process, creating a new one," a search engine provides social benefit by incorporating an original work into a new work, namely, an electronic reference tool. Indeed, a search engine may be more transformative than a parody because a search engine provides an entirely new use for the original work, while a parody typically has the same entertainment purpose as the original work.

...In conducting our case-specific analysis of fair use in light of the purposes of copyright, we must weigh Google's superseding and commercial uses of thumbnail images against Google's significant transformative use, as well as the extent to which Google's search engine promotes the purposes of copyright and serves the interests of the public. Although the district court acknowledged the "truism that search engines such as Google Image Search provide great value to the public," the district court did not expressly consider whether this value outweighed the significance of Google's superseding use or the commercial nature of Google's use. The Supreme Court, however, has directed us to be mindful of the extent to which a use promotes the purposes of copyright and serves the interests of the public.

...We conclude that the significantly transformative nature of Google's search engine, particularly in light of its public benefit, outweighs Google's superseding and commercial uses of the thumbnails in this case. ... We are also mindful of the Supreme Court's direction that "the more transformative the new work, the less will be the significance of other factors, like commercialism, that may weigh against a finding of fair use."

The Ninth Circuit's treatment of transformativeness and fair use in the Arriba Soft and Perfect 10 cases illustrates different data points on the copyright infringement spectrum, at least with respect to transformativeness and fair use. Arriba Soft was a relatively polar case. The harm to Kelly, the copyright owner, was negligible; it was hardly more than hurt feelings, because as the Ninth Circuit said in its opinion – "Arriba's creation and use of the thumbnails [the derivative work] does not harm the market for or value of Kelly' s images." On the other hand, the court found that Arriba's use benefited the public: "Arriba's use of the images serves a different function than Kelly's use — improving access to information on the internet versus artistic expression." The balance thus tilted strongly in Arriba's favor. The foregoing analysis in this case thus made the Ninth Circuit to be the first court to make the equation highly beneficial to public = transformative, and as the Supreme Court explained in Campbell, the more transformative a derivative use the more likely the use is to be a fair use.

The Campbell Court recognized that the balance may not always be one-sided, as it was in Campbell itself and in Arriba Soft. In the Perfect 10 case the interests were more evenly balanced, for the first time in a derivative work case involving new information technology. Both Google and Perfect 10 had legitimate interests at stake and support for their respective positions. Thus, there was a finding that "Google's wide-ranging use of thumbnails is highly transformative: their creation and display is designed to, and does, display visual search results quickly and efficiently to users of Google Image Search." But Google's use had some commercial aspects and was claimed to impair P10's commercial interests. Yet, on balance the Ninth Circuit found that the transformativeness outweighed the other fair use factors because "Google has provided a significant benefit to the public" in facilitating image searches by means of thumbnail images. This opinion provided a second instance of the "beneficial=transformative" equation described in the preceding paragraph (from the Arriba Soft case).

Screenshot of Half.com pop-up ad over Amazon's Web page c. 2008

The use of pop-up advertising, in which third-party advertisements pop up on a competitor's Web page and change its appearance to allegedly create a derivative work, may present transformativeness issues. The proponents of such pop-ups (the defendants in infringement litigation) argue that they provide the public with additional information about making buying decisions (particularly in the form of price comparisons), but the opponents (the plaintiffs in these cases) argue that the defendants' conduct adversely affects the Web page proprietor's interest in the "integrity" of its Web page and its investment interest in creating and maintaining the page.

Little attention has been paid to the balancing of the interests at stake in derivative work copyright disputes where conflicting interests are present. In the Perfect 10 and Castle Rock cases, however, the courts appeared to have recognized that some conflict existed, but they finessed the balancing task by finding one side or the other's interest negligible, so that no serious work had to be done in gauging the balance. although several courts have found no copyright infringement for one reason or another. In an analogous area of copyright law, a solution reached was to permit the use challenged as infringement, but to require payment of a reasonable royalty.

=== Examples of derivative works under U.S. law ===
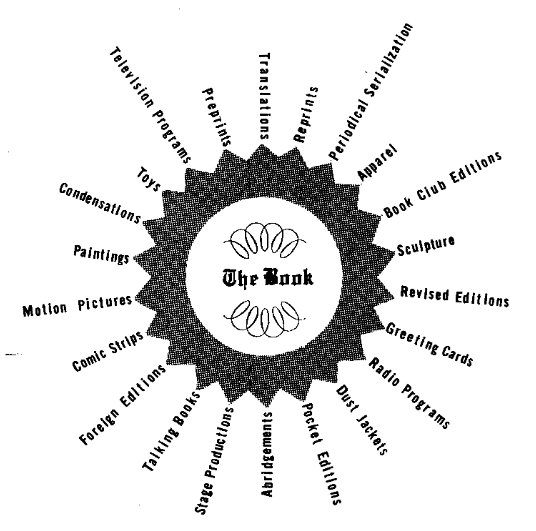
Graphic from the United States Copyright Office, 1959, giving examples of derivative works

The most famous derivative work in the world has been said to be L.H.O.O.Q., also known as the Mona Lisa With a Moustache. Generations of U.S. copyright law professors — since at least the 1950s — have used it as a paradigmatic example. Marcel Duchamp created the work by adding, among other things, a moustache, goatee, and the caption L.H.O.O.Q. (letters which phonetically resemble the phrase in French "She is hot in the ass") to Leonardo's iconic work. These few seemingly insubstantial additions were highly transformative because they incensed contemporary French bourgeoisie by mocking their cult of "Jocondisme," at that time said to be "practically a secular religion of the French bourgeoisie and an important part of their self image." Duchamp's defacement of their icon was considered "a major stroke of épater le bourgeois." Thus it has been said that the "transformation of a cult icon into an object of ridicule by adding a small quantum of additional material can readily be deemed preparation of a derivative work." L.H.O.O.Q inspired multiple parody works.

The mockery of "Oh, Pretty Woman," discussed in Campbell v. Acuff-Rose Music, Inc., is a similar example of transforming a work by showing it in a harsh new light or criticizing its underlying assumptions. Because of the parody's transformativeness, the Supreme Court found the derivative work a fair use.

Trivia books based on TV shows, such as Seinfeld, are considered derivative works, for purposes of infringement liability, at least if they incorporate a substantial amount of copyright-protected content from the TV episodes. In Castle Rock the court found that any transformative purpose possessed in the derivative work was "slight to non-existent." Accordingly, the court held that defendants had prepared an infringing derivative work.

A 2007 lawsuit, CBS Operations v. Reel Funds International, ruled that television series that have some episodes lapse into the public domain can be classified as derivative works and subject to indirect copyright accordingly. The lawsuit centered around 16 episodes of The Andy Griffith Show from the show's third season that had lapsed into the public domain in 1989; CBS successfully argued that because all of the episodes from the show's first two seasons were still under valid copyright, that CBS still held copyright on the characters used in those episodes and could block a public domain distributor from selling DVDs with those episodes.

The musical West Side Story, is a derivative work based on Shakespeare's Romeo and Juliet, because it uses numerous expressive elements from the earlier work. However, Shakespeare's drama Romeo and Juliet is also a derivative work that draws heavily from Pyramus and Thisbe and other sources. Nevertheless, no legal rule prevents a derivative work from being based on a work that is itself a derivative work based on a still earlier work — at least, so long as the last work borrows expressive elements from the second work that are original with the second work rather than taken from the earliest work. The key is whether the copied elements are original and expressive (not merely conventional or mise en scène); if that is so, the second or derivative work is independently subject to copyright protection, and if that is not, the second work (if unauthorized) may infringe the first, but it is not independently copyrightable.

Pop-up advertising provides derivative works that can be transformative, in that they provide the public with new functionality not previously offered — they may provide comparative price information, for example. Yet, pop-ups may also impair interests of the proprietors of Web pages subjected to them. For example, the Half.com pop-up ad shown above left informs the public as to price competition between Half.com and Amazon.com. But the derivative-work version of Amazon's web page partially covers up Amazon's advertising (at least temporarily) and adversely affects Amazon's investment interest in the preparation and maintenance of its web page. This may present a more difficult case of balancing interests than that which the court faced in Arriba Soft or Perfect 10.

GIF animation and pop-up advertising are examples of derivative works that became possible only with the advent of recent technology. One type of derivative work, annotations, have long existed. However, new technology permits the creation of new forms of annotation.

The Internet Archive had created an archive of scans of books which it had physical copies of, which it initially lent out digitally in a controlled manner. However, during the COVID-19 pandemic, the Internet Archive expanded the availability of the archives with an initiative it called the National Emergency Library, during which they removed the waitlists on the books that limited the number of people who could use them at the same time. Four major publishers filed suit against the Archive, and the court ruled in the publishers' favor in March 2023, declaring that the unrestricted access to the National Emergency Library infringed their copyrights. According to the court, the book scans were derivative works and the expansive National Emergency Library concept was unsupported by fair use, so it required permission from the book publishers that the Internet Archive did not receive.

== See also ==
- Authorship
- Plagiarism
- Copyright Act of 1976
- Copyright aspects of hyperlinking and framing
- Creative Commons
- Derivative Work Controversy in Hong Kong
- Fan labor
  - Fan art
  - Fan fiction
  - Fan edit
  - Doujinshi
- Galoob v. Nintendo
- Intellectual property
- Merchandising
- Pastiche
- Patent
- Threshold of originality
- Trademark
- Trade secret
- Video game modding
- Work for hire

== Bibliography ==
- Bellefonds, Xavier Linant de, Droits d'auteur et Droits Voisins, Dalloz, Paris, 2002
