= Thumbshot =

Screenshots in small thumbnail sizes

Thumbshots are screenshots of online documents such as web page in small thumbnail sizes. Thumbshots help users to visualize web sites or preview links before clicking. The dimension of a thumbshot image (usually under 120 pixels in width by 90 pixels in height) is generally much smaller than the actual online document allowing users to download and view a sample of the document quickly. Thumbshots can be automatically generated by custom software or manually screen captured using popular graphics programs.

Some thumbshot pictures are enhanced with informative icons or text highlights. Normally, thumbshots are found embedded inline beside hyperlinks in a web page to help improve web browser navigation by helping users to locate information faster. Thumbshots are often used to provide visual hints in search engines and web directories where a large number of text links are displayed on a page.

One of the early applications of thumbshots was developed by Jakob Nielsen while working for Sun Microsystems. The application consisted of capturing and then displaying a small image of a webpage that a user had saved as a bookmark in their web browser. At that time, they were referred to as visual bookmarks.

Since then, thumbshots have been used in numerous different applications, ranging from Windows Explorer and a desktop search engine like Copernic to Internet search engines and web directories which provide a thumbshot preview of a webpage alongside search results.

== See also ==
- Screenshot
- Thumbnail
