= Perfect 10, Inc. v. Amazon.com, Inc. =

2007 American legal decision

- Court: United States Court of Appeals for the Ninth Circuit
- Full case name: Perfect 10, Inc. v. Amazon.com, Inc. and A9.com Inc. and Google Inc.
- Argued: November 15, 2006
- Decided: May 16, 2007
- Citation: 508 F.3d 1146

Case history
- Prior history: Grant of partial injunctive relief: Perfect 10 v. Google, Inc., 416 F. Supp. 2d 828 (C.D. Cal. 2006).

Holding
- The use of thumbnail versions of copyright images for search engine purposes is transformative use, and falls within the fair use provisions of United States copyright law.

Court membership
- Judges sitting: Cynthia Holcomb Hall, Michael Daly Hawkins, and Sandra S. Ikuta

Case opinions
- Majority: Ikuta, joined by Hall, Hawkins

Laws applied
- 17 U.S.C. § 107

Perfect 10, Inc. v. Amazon.com, Inc., 508 F.3d 1146 (9th Cir., 2007) was a case in the United States Court of Appeals for the Ninth Circuit involving a copyright infringement claim against Amazon.com, Inc. and Google, Inc., by the magazine publisher Perfect 10, Inc. The court held that framing and hyperlinking of original images for use in an image search engine constituted a fair use of Perfect 10's images because the use was highly transformative, and thus not an infringement of the magazine's copyright ownership of the original images.

The case originated as a suit against Google, with Amazon being added as another defendant at the Circuit Court hearings, because Amazon used thumbnail images that had been obtained from Google.

== Background ==
Perfect 10 was an adult entertainment magazine that featured sexual images of models. It also operated a subscription-only website featuring such images and leased some of these images to other businesses. A number of independent, third-party website publishers placed images obtained from Perfect 10's subscription-only area on their own websites, violating Perfect 10's terms of service and copyright.

Google crawls, indexes, and caches websites on its internal servers so they can be accessed quickly. The sites crawled included many of the third-party sites containing Perfect 10's copyrighted images. As part of its image search service, Google also provides thumbnail copies of the images that are being searched for, so the user may see them before accessing the website. Furthermore, when a user selects an image from a Google search, a new page is accessed that includes the original website as well as a frame that contains information about the image and the thumbnail version of the image. Google did not store or physically transmit the full images, only their thumbnails.

Perfect 10 believed the linking constituted secondary copyright infringement, and the caching and thumbnails constituted direct infringement. Beginning in May 2001, Perfect 10 sent notices to Google informing it of specific links to infringing images in its general Web search and requesting their removal. In May 2004, it began sending similar notices for Google's new image search functionality. Google stated that it complied with the notices where it could find the infringement and determine that it was in fact an infringement, removing the images from Google Search.

However, Google noted that it was unable to do this in many cases due to deficiencies in the requests. Perfect 10 sent infringement notifications to Google for nearly four years, eventually filing suit against both Google and Amazon for similar activities. Perfect 10 requested injunctions against Google and Amazon from linking to websites displaying Perfect 10's images and, in the case of Google, displaying the thumbnail images.

== District Court opinion ==
Perfect 10 filed suit against Google in the United States District Court for the Central District of California in 2004, asserting various copyright and trademark infringement claims, including direct, contributory, and vicarious copyright infringement. After settlement discussions lasting several months, Perfect 10 filed for a preliminary injunction that would require Google to stop linking to and distributing its images. The district court granted partial injunctive relief in favor of Perfect 10. Specifically, it ruled that Google's thumbnail images of the copyrighted content were likely to be found infringing, while the hyperlinks to sites hosting the copyrighted content were not likely to be found infringing in and of themselves. Google subsequently appealed the injunction against displaying the thumbnail images while Perfect 10 appealed the district court's decision on the hyperlinks.

=== Direct infringement ===
Perfect 10 made two claims of direct copyright infringement:

First, Perfect 10 argued that Google's framing of infringing web images constituted direct infringement, and requested that Google be enjoined from continuing this practice. The district court found that Google would infringe the distribution and display rights by framing others' content only if it hosted and physically transmitted the content itself (the "server test"). The court rejected Perfect 10's argument that the relevant question should be whether the content is visually incorporated into the site (the "incorporation test"). Since Google only provided an instruction for the user's computer to fetch the infringing images from servers not under its control, rather than hosting or transmitting the content itself, the court found that Perfect 10 was unlikely to succeed on this point, and so denied its request for an injunction.

Second, Perfect 10 argued that Google's creation and distribution of thumbnail images was direct infringement, and requested that Google be enjoined from creating and distributing thumbnails of its images. Google did not dispute that it displayed and distributed protected derivative works of the plaintiff's images. However, it argued that the use of the works in such thumbnails was protected under the copyright doctrine of fair use. The district court found that Google's use of the images was commercial and partially transformative (intended to serve a fundamentally different purpose than the originals).

On Google's claim for the fair use defense, the court analyzed the four factors of fair use and concluded:

The first, second, and fourth fair use factors weigh slightly in favor of P10 [Perfect 10]. The third weighs in neither party’s favor. Accordingly, the Court concludes that Google’s creation of thumbnails of P10’s copyrighted full-size images, and the subsequent display of those thumbnails as Google Image Search results, likely do not fall within the fair use exception. The Court reaches this conclusion despite the enormous public benefit that search engines such as Google provide. Although the Court is reluctant to issue a ruling that might impede the advance of internet technology, and although it is appropriate for courts to consider the immense value to the public of such technologies, existing judicial precedents do not allow such considerations to trump a reasoned analysis of the four fair use factors.

Therefore, the court ruled that Perfect 10 was entitled to injunctive relief for Google's use of thumbnail images.

=== Contributory infringement ===
Perfect 10 alleged that Google had also committed contributory copyright infringement and vicarious copyright infringement. First, Google allegedly committed contributory infringement by encouraging users to visit infringing sites; and second, it allegedly committed vicarious infringement by profiting from the infringement of others.

The court ruled that Google did not, in any case, facilitate infringement, because "[infringing] websites existed long before Google Image Search was developed and would continue to exist were Google Image Search shut down". Therefore, the court found that Perfect 10 did not demonstrate its likelihood to succeed in a contributory infringement claim, and consequently denied injunctive relief. With respect to vicarious infringement, the court held that Google derived direct financial benefit from infringement of Perfect 10's copyright (in the form of AdWords and AdSense profits), but that it had no power to stop the infringements even if it knew of them. Therefore, the court found Perfect 10 unlikely to succeed in a vicarious infringement claim, and consequently denied injunctive relief.

== Ninth Circuit opinion ==
Perfect 10 appealed the district court decision, at which point Amazon was added to the proceedings because Perfect 10 learned that Amazon was displaying thumbnail images obtained from Google. In its appeal brief, Perfect 10 argued that the district court had "failed to even cite the broad definition of 'display' in the Copyright Act. Instead the Court substituted its own policy determination and novel 'server' test, requiring that a defendant violate the reproduction right (by copying images onto its own server) as a necessary condition to finding the display right violated. This 'bright line' test is without precedent and erroneously conflates the act of copying and storing images with displaying them."

On appeal, the Ninth Circuit upheld the district court's "server test" and its decision that the hyperlinks did not infringe on Perfect 10's copyright. It agreed with the district court's assessment that infringing websites existed before Google and would continue to exist without Google, thus it was not a contributory infringer. Furthermore, Google had no control over infringing sites and could not shut them down, so any profits it may or may not extract from users visiting those sites did not constitute vicarious infringement. The court also agreed that including an inline link is not the same as hosting the material itself. So in the case of framing, while it may "appear" that Google was hosting infringing material, it was only hosting a link to the material which the browser interpreted should appear in a certain way.

The Ninth Circuit did, however, overturn the district court's decision that Google's thumbnail images were unauthorized and infringing copies of Perfect 10's original images. Google claimed that these images constituted fair use, and the circuit court agreed. This was because they were "highly transformative." The court pointed out that Google made available to the public the new and highly beneficial function of "improving access to [pictorial] information on the Internet." This had the effect of recognizing that "search engine technology provides an astoundingly valuable public benefit, which should not be jeopardized just because it might be used in a way that could affect somebody's sales."

== Subsequent developments ==
In its Perfect 10 ruling, the Ninth Circuit affirmed the "server test" that had first been formulated by the District Court. However, that test was rejected by some other federal courts with the advent of later technologies. The District Court for the Southern District of New York has rejected the "server test" in three different rulings, stating most notably in Nicklen v. Mashable Inc. et al. (2021) that the test contradicts the meaning of the term "display" in American copyright law and that the copyright holder can make an infringement claim. That court has also ruled that copyright holders can claim copyright infringement when they photos appear in social media posts. These rulings have attracted attention from media and technology commentators because it conflicted with the approach taken in Perfect 10.

The server test has also been raised in litigation involving online news aggregators. The United States Court of Appeals for the Fifth Circuit ruled in Emmerich Newspapers, Inc. v. Particle Media, Inc. that the use of copyrighted content by an aggregator site could violate the provisions of the Digital Millennium Copyright Act. Legal experts noted that this ruling could be significant for websites and applications that embed or display online content without hosting the material on their own servers.

== See also ==
- Copyright aspects of hyperlinking and framing
