= Copyright (Amendment) Bill 2014 =

Proposed legislation of Hong Kong

Legislative Council of Hong Kong
- Long title: A Bill to amend the Copyright Ordinance to provide for the rights to communicate a work or performance to the public by a copyright owner or performer; for limiting an online service provider's liability; for acts that may be done without infringing copyright or performers' rights; for additional factors in considering whether additional damages should be awarded in an action for infringement; and for related matters.
- Considered by: Legislative Council of Hong Kong

Legislative history
- Introduced by: Secretary for Commerce and Economic Development Gregory So
- Introduced: 13 June 2014
- First reading: 18 June 2014
- Committee report: Report of the Bills Committee on Copyright (Amendment) Bill 2014

Related legislation
- Copyright Ordinance; Personal Data (Privacy) Ordinance; Control of Obscene and Indecent Articles Ordinance; Prevention of Child Pornography Ordinance
- Status: Halted

Copyright (Amendment) Bill 2014
- Traditional Chinese: 2014年版權（修訂）條例草案
- Simplified Chinese: 2014年版权（修订）条例草案
Transcriptions
Standard Mandarin
- Hanyu Pinyin: 2014-nián Bǎnquán (Xiūdìng) Tiáolì Cǎo'àn
Yue: Cantonese
- Jyutping: 2014-nin4 baan2 kyun4 (sau1 ding3) tiu4 lai6 cou2 on3

Copyright (Amendment) Bill 2014 (Chinese: 2014年版權（修訂）條例草案) broadly refers to a set of proposed ordinances regulating the internet in Hong Kong. Under debate is the legality of derivative works popular on the internet, including doujin drawings, kuso, parodies, and the modification and adaptation of the lyrics in Hong Kong. Because of the upsurge of derivative work, the Hong Kong Government has amended related legislations in order to regulate the Internet, as well as legislation extending coverage to the existing network of Internet users. The bill was also dubbed the Internet Article 23 (Chinese: 網絡23條) after the controversial Article 23 of the Basic Law which stroke curbing personal freedom.

Many people believe that related regulations will let the derivative work bear criminal responsibility easily, including the modified or adapted song or pictures. As a result, it strived to public opposition. Due to the opposition, the Government shelved the amendment in May 2012. By July 2013 the Government launched a consultation once again in order to let people discuss on how this type of "parody works" can be exempted from criminal responsibility.

== Provisions ==
The Bill amends various legislations, including –

- Copyright Ordinance, over the digital online copyright infringement;
- Personal Data (Privacy) Ordinance, over the online human flesh search engine problems;
- Control of Obscene and Indecent Articles Ordinance, over the problems of online sharing of pornographic movies and pictures;
- Prevention of Child Pornography Ordinance, over the problems of sharing information to children under 16 years old such as pornographic animations.

== Discussion ==
On the controversial topic of whether allowing derivative work in Hong Kong, intense debate occurs in the city. People who are against re-creation deem it necessary to introduce legislation to regulate or even prohibit derivative work, with an aim to protect the reputation and interest of the original author. They criticized those involved in derivative work for not respecting copyright. Those against the law amendment reasoned that derivative works encompass too broad a spectrum for the legal restrictions to be justified, and that the amended law could stifle mass creativity, violating the freedom of creation. Criticisms about the emphasis on self-interest of productions were also fired, stating that the new law shows a lack of consideration for the public's right to enjoy derivatives and inhibits the expression of opinions about the original work. It has also been brought out that the original author has the right to distribute their work, which includes the prohibition of use, adaptation, selling and all kinds of derivation. As it depends on the acknowledgement of the author, it is doubtful as to whether derivative works violate copyright.

== Re-consultation on Internet Article 23 ==
On July 11, 2013, based on the issue users concern most about the amendment of the Copyright Ordinance, kuso work, the Government published the consultation document and offers three options, launched a three-month public consultation.

The first option has the same concessions proposed by the Government last year. Parody commonly disseminated on the Internet nowadays would likely fall outside the criminal net given that they would not normally displace the market of the copyright work and distribution of the same would unlikely cause “more than trivial economic prejudice” to the copyright owner. The second option specifies that the prejudicial distribution offense shall not apply to parodies, as long as the distribution in question meets the qualifying condition. The third option is recommended that, in accordance with Australia, Canada and the United Kingdom's experience and method, the distribution of parody would not infringe copyright and hence would not attract any criminal liability, as long as the act is considered as fair dealing.

On the same day, the Keyboard Frontline and the Concern Group of Rights of Derivative Works issued a joint declaration stated that they have received an email from the Intellectual Property Department in the afternoon on July 10, inviting related organizations concerned with the amendment of Copyright Ordinance to Central Government Offices at 11:30 am on July 11 to discuss parody issue of Copyright (Amendment) Bill. They believe that the Government invited them in less than 24 hours, questioned its sincerity, and suspected that the Government didn't welcome the organization opposing Copyright (Amendment) Bill 2011 and created the illusion of "consulted with the opposition". They said "very dissatisfied" and boycotted the meeting, reaffirmed that they urge the Government to fully exempt the legal responsibility of derivative work.

== Related issues ==
The aim of distributing Internet Article 23 to boycott subordinate work On 3 June 2011, the Hong Kong government distributed the draft of Copyright (Amendment) Bill 2011 form in the Gazette. In the draft, it incorporated the netizens "parody" and other innovative works in the optional encroachment go. It at that point draw a ton of contention, the netizens felt that it would deny their right to speak freely and imaginative which ought to be secured by the Basic Law. There was much controversy among the society, the majority of the netizens tended to beg differ with the draft while some of the copyright holder tended to support. CHAN Kam-lam, one of the legislative councilors in Hong Kong said that he agreed with the draft, tons of kuso targeting Chan then being created and published online.

Netizens launched demonstrations to show their stands concerning the derivative work On 4 December 2011, some social movement organizations like Keyboard Frontline and Netizens Power launched a demonstration which aimed to show their discontent about the draft of Copyright (Amendment) Bill 2011 version which defined derivative work as Criminal charge without any consultation in the society. Soon, the Government said that the second round debate of the draft will be restarted in the Legislative Council. Once again, the netizens launched another demonstration to show disagree and for this time, they even demonstrated to Central Government Offices.
