= Fair use =

Concept in United States copyright law

Fair use is a doctrine in United States law that permits limited use of copyrighted material without permission from the copyright holder. Fair use is one of the limitations to copyright intended to balance the interests of copyright holders with the public interest in the wider distribution and use of creative works by allowing a defense to copyright infringement claims for certain limited uses that might otherwise be considered infringement. The U.S. "fair use doctrine" is generally broader than the "fair dealing" rights known in most countries that inherited English common law. The fair use right is a general exception that applies to all different kinds of uses with all types of works. In the U.S., fair use right/exception is based on a flexible proportionality test that examines the purpose of the use, the nature of the copyrighted work, the amount used, and the impact on the market of the original work.

The doctrine of "fair use" originated as a judicially created common law during the 18th and 19th centuries as a way of preventing copyright law from being too rigidly applied and "stifling the very creativity which [copyright] law is designed to foster." Though originally a common law doctrine, it was enshrined in statutory law when the U.S. Congress passed the Copyright Act of 1976. The U.S. Supreme Court has issued several major decisions clarifying and reaffirming the fair use doctrine since the 1980s, the most recent being in the 2023 decision Andy Warhol Foundation for the Visual Arts, Inc. v. Goldsmith.

== History ==
The 1710 Statute of Anne, an act of the Parliament of Great Britain, created copyright law to replace a system of private ordering enforced by the Stationers' Company. The Statute of Anne did not provide for legal unauthorized use of material protected by copyright. In Gyles v Wilcox (1740), the Court of Chancery established the doctrine of "fair abridgement", which permitted unauthorized abridgement of copyrighted works under certain circumstances. Over time, this doctrine evolved into the modern concepts of fair use and fair dealing. Fair use was a common-law (i.e. created by judges as a legal precedent) doctrine in the U.S. until it was incorporated into the Copyright Act of 1976, 17 U.S.C. § 107.

The term "fair use" originated in the United States. Although related, the limitations and exceptions to copyright for teaching and library archiving in the U.S. are located in a different section of the statute. A similar-sounding principle, fair dealing, exists in some other common law jurisdictions but in fact it is more similar in principle to the enumerated exceptions found under civil law systems. Civil law jurisdictions have other limitations and exceptions to copyright.

In response to perceived over-expansion of copyrights, several electronic civil liberties and free expression organizations began in the 1990s to add fair use cases to their dockets and concerns. These include the Electronic Frontier Foundation ("EFF"), the American Civil Liberties Union, the National Coalition Against Censorship, the American Library Association, numerous clinical programs at law schools, and others. The "Chilling Effects" archive was established in 2002 as a coalition of several law school clinics and the EFF to document the use of cease and desist letters. In 2006, Stanford University began an initiative called the "Fair Use Project" (FUP) to help artists, particularly filmmakers, fight lawsuits brought against them by large corporations.

== U.S. fair use factors ==
Examples of fair use in United States copyright law include commentary, criticism, news reporting, research, and scholarship, as well as parody and search engines. Fair use provides for the legal, unlicensed citation or incorporation of copyrighted material in another author's work under a four-factor test.

The U.S. Supreme Court has traditionally characterized fair use as an affirmative defense, but in Lenz v. Universal Music Corp. (2015) (the "dancing baby" case), the U.S. Court of Appeals for the Ninth Circuit concluded that fair use was not merely a defense to an infringement claim, but was an expressly authorized right, and an exception to the exclusive rights granted to the author of a creative work by copyright law: "Fair use is therefore distinct from affirmative defenses where a use infringes a copyright, but there is no liability due to a valid excuse, e.g., misuse of a copyright."

17 U.S.C. § 107

Notwithstanding the provisions of sections 17 U.S.C. § 106 and 17 U.S.C. § 106A, the fair use of a copyrighted work, including such use by reproduction in copies or phonorecords or by any other means specified by that section, for purposes such as criticism, comment, news reporting, teaching (including multiple copies for classroom use), scholarship, or research, is not an infringement of copyright. In determining whether the use made of a work in any particular case is a fair use the factors to be considered shall include:

1. the purpose and character of the use, including whether such use is of a commercial nature or is for nonprofit educational purposes;
2. the nature of the copyrighted work;
3. the amount and substantiality of the portion used in relation to the copyrighted work as a whole; and
4. the effect of the use upon the potential market for or value of the copyrighted work.

The fact that a work is unpublished shall not itself bar a finding of fair use if such finding is made upon consideration of all the above factors.

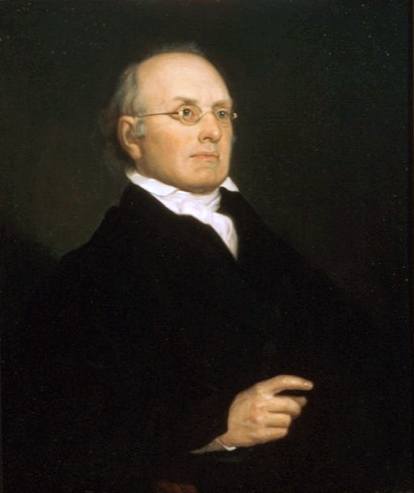
Joseph Story wrote the opinion in Folsom v. Marsh.

The four factors of analysis for fair use set forth above derive from the opinion of Joseph Story in Folsom v. Marsh, in which the defendant had copied 353 pages from the plaintiff's 12-volume biography of George Washington in order to produce a separate two-volume work of his own. The court rejected the defendant's fair use defense with the following explanation:

[A] reviewer may fairly cite largely from the original work, if his design be really and truly to use the passages for the purposes of fair and reasonable criticism. On the other hand, it is as clear, that if he thus cites the most important parts of the work, with a view, not to criticize, but to supersede the use of the original work, and substitute the review for it, such a use will be deemed in law a piracy ...

In short, we must often ... look to the nature and objects of the selections made, the quantity and value of the materials used, and the degree in which the use may prejudice the sale, or diminish the profits, or supersede the objects, of the original work.

The statutory fair use factors quoted above come from the Copyright Act of 1976, which is codified at 17 U.S.C. § 107. They were intended by Congress to clarify rather than to replace, the prior judge-made law. As Judge Pierre N. Leval has written, the statute does not "define or explain [fair use's] contours or objectives". While it "leav[es] open the possibility that other factors may bear on the question, the statute identifies none." That is, courts are entitled to consider other factors in addition to the four statutory factors.

=== 1. Purpose and character of the use ===
The first factor is "the purpose and character of the use, including whether such use is of a commercial nature or is for nonprofit educational purposes". To justify the use as fair, one must demonstrate how it either advances knowledge or the progress of the arts through the addition of something new.

In the 1841 copyright case Folsom v. Marsh, Justice Joseph Story wrote:

[A] reviewer may fairly cite largely from the original work, if his design be really and truly to use the passages for the purposes of fair and reasonable criticism. On the other hand, it is as clear, that if he thus cites the most important parts of the work, with a view, not to criticise, but to supersede the use of the original work, and substitute the review for it, such a use will be deemed in law a piracy.

A key consideration in later fair use cases is the extent to which the use is transformative. In the 1994 decision Campbell v. Acuff-Rose Music Inc, the U.S. Supreme Court held that when the purpose of the use is transformative, this makes the first factor more likely to favor fair use. Before the Campbell decision, federal Judge Pierre Leval argued that transformativeness is central to the fair use analysis in his 1990 article, Toward a Fair Use Standard. Blanch v. Koons is another example of a fair use case that focused on transformativeness. In 2006, Jeff Koons used a photograph taken by commercial photographer Andrea Blanch in a collage painting. Koons appropriated a central portion of an advertisement she had been commissioned to shoot for a magazine. Koons prevailed in part because his use was found transformative under the first fair use factor.

The Campbell case also addressed the subfactor mentioned in the quotation above, "whether such use is of a commercial nature or is for nonprofit educational purposes". In an earlier case, Sony Corp. of America v. Universal City Studios, Inc., the Supreme Court had stated that "every commercial use of copyrighted material is presumptively ... unfair." In Campbell, the court clarified that this is not a "hard evidentiary presumption" and that even the tendency that commercial purpose will "weigh against a finding of fair use ... will vary with the context." The Campbell court held that hip-hop group 2 Live Crew's parody of the song "Oh, Pretty Woman" was fair use, even though the parody was sold for profit. Thus, having a commercial purpose does not preclude a use from being found fair, even though it makes it less likely.

Likewise, the noncommercial purpose of a use makes it more likely to be found a fair use, but it does not make it a fair use automatically. For instance, in L.A. Times v. Free Republic, the court found that the noncommercial use of Los Angeles Times content by the Free Republic website was not fair use, since it allowed the public to obtain material at no cost that they would otherwise pay for. Richard Story similarly ruled in Code Revision Commission and State of Georgia v. Public.Resource.Org, Inc. that despite the fact that it is a non-profit and did not sell the work, the service profited from its unauthorized publication of the Official Code of Georgia Annotated because of "the attention, recognition, and contributions" it received in association with the work. This was overruled by the Supreme Court of the United States in Georgia v. Public.Resource.Org, Inc., 590 U.S. 255 (2020).

Another factor is whether the use fulfills any of the preamble purposes, also mentioned in the legislation above, as these have been interpreted as "illustrative" of transformative use.

In determining that Prince's appropriation art could constitute fair use and that many of his works were transformative fair uses of Cariou's photographs, the Second Circuit in Cariou v. Prince, 714 F.3d 694 (2d. Cir. 2013) shed light on how transformative use is determined. "What is critical is how the work in question appears to the reasonable observer, not simply what an artist might say about a particular piece or body of work." The district court's conclusion that Prince's work was not transformative is partly based on Prince's deposition testimony that he "do[es]n't really have a message", and that he was not "trying to create anything with a new meaning or a new message". However, the artist's intended message "is not dispositive". Instead, the focus of the transformative use inquiry is how the artworks will "reasonably be perceived".

The transformativeness inquiry is a deceptively simple test to determine whether a new work has a different purpose and character from an original work. However, courts have not been consistent in deciding whether something is transformative. For instance, in Seltzer v. Green Day, Inc., 725 F.3d 1170 (9th Cir. 2013), the court found that Green Day's use of Seltzer's copyrighted Scream Icon was transformative. The court held that Green Day's modifications to the original Scream Icon conveyed new information and aesthetics from the original piece.

Conversely, the Second Circuit came to the opposite conclusion in a similar situation in Andy Warhol Foundation for the Visual Arts, Inc. v. Goldsmith, 11 F.4th 26 (2d. Cir. 2021). In that case, the Warhol Foundation sought a declaratory judgment that Warhol's use of one of Goldsmith's celebrity photographs was fair use. The court held that Warhol's use was not transformative because Warhol merely imposed his own style on Goldsmith's photograph and retained the photograph's essential elements.

=== 2. Nature of the copyrighted work ===
The unpublished nature of J. D. Salinger's letters was a key issue in the court's analysis of the second fair use factor in Salinger v. Random House.

Although the Supreme Court has ruled that the availability of copyright protection should not depend on the artistic quality or merit of a work, fair use analyses consider certain aspects of the work to be relevant, such as whether it is fictional or non-fictional.

To prevent the private ownership of work that rightfully belongs in the public domain, facts and ideas are not protected by copyright—only their particular expression or fixation merits such protection. On the other hand, the social usefulness of freely available information can weigh against the appropriateness of copyright for certain fixations. The Zapruder film of the assassination of President Kennedy, for example, was purchased and copyrighted by Time magazine. Yet its copyright was not upheld, in the name of the public interest, when Time tried to enjoin the reproduction of stills from the film in a history book on the subject in Time Inc v. Bernard Geis Associates. The issue of copyright of the Zapruder film is currently on appeal in the 9th Circuit in FoiaConsciousness.com LLC. v. National Archives & Records Administration even though it long entered the public sphere following the publication of its core assassination frames in the Warren Report.

In the decisions of the Second Circuit in Salinger v. Random House and in New Era Publications Int'l v. Henry Holt & Co, the aspect of whether the copied work has been previously published was considered crucial, assuming the right of the original author to control the circumstances of the publication of his work or preference not to publish at all. However, Judge Pierre N. Leval views this importation of certain aspects of France's droit moral d'artiste (moral rights of the artist) into American copyright law as "bizarre and contradictory" because it sometimes grants greater protection to works that were created for private purposes that have little to do with the public goals of copyright law, than to those works that copyright was initially conceived to protect. This is not to claim that unpublished works, or, more specifically, works not intended for publication, do not deserve legal protection, but that any such protection should come from laws about privacy, rather than laws about copyright. The statutory fair use provision was amended in response to these concerns by adding a final sentence: "The fact that a work is unpublished shall not itself bar a finding of fair use if such finding is made upon consideration of all the above factors."

=== 3. Amount and substantiality ===
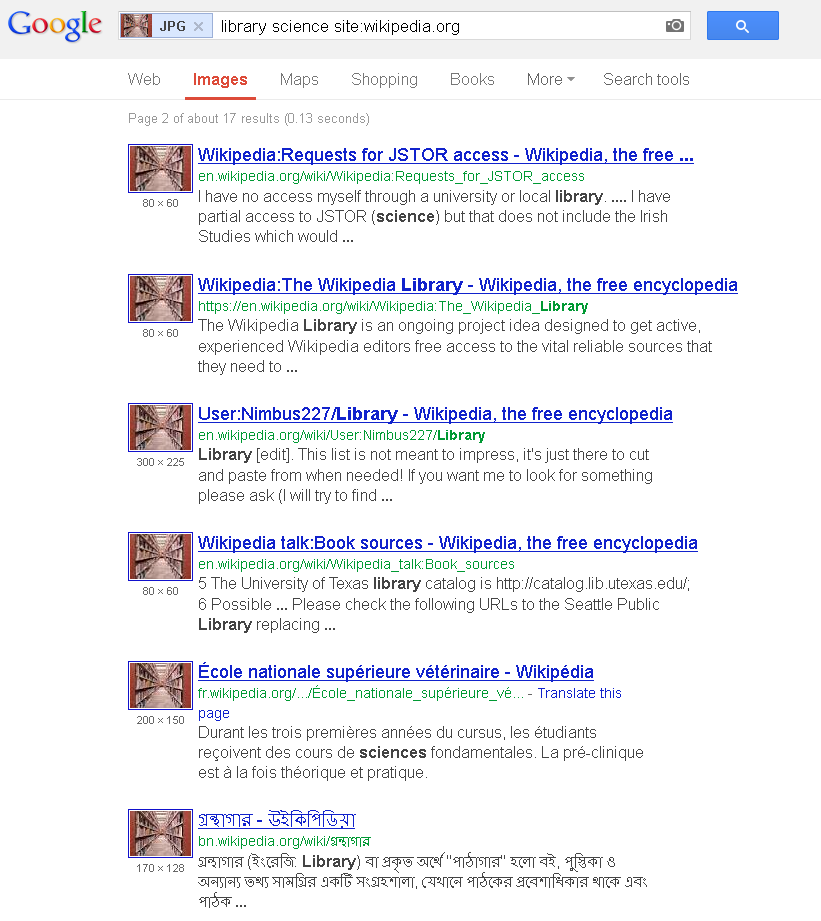
The Ninth Circuit has held that the use of thumbnails in image search engines is fair use.

The third factor assesses the amount and substantiality of the copyrighted work that has been used. In general, the less that is used in relation to the whole, the more likely the use will be considered fair.

Using most or all of a work does not bar a finding of fair use. It simply makes the third factor less favorable to the defendant. For instance, in Sony Corp. of America v. Universal City Studios, Inc. copying entire television programs for private viewing was upheld as fair use, at least when the copying is done for the purposes of time-shifting. In Kelly v. Arriba Soft Corporation, the Ninth Circuit held that copying an entire photo to use as a thumbnail in online search results did not even weigh against fair use, "if the secondary user only copies as much as is necessary for his or her intended use".

However, even the use of a small percentage of a work can make the third factor unfavorable to the defendant, because the "substantiality" of the portion used is considered in addition to the amount used. For instance, in Harper & Row v. Nation Enterprises, the U.S. Supreme Court held that a news article's quotation of fewer than 400 words from President Ford's 200,000-word memoir was sufficient to make the third fair use factor weigh against the defendants, because the portion taken was the "heart of the work". This use was ultimately found not to be fair.

=== 4. Effect upon work's value ===
The fourth factor measures the effect that the allegedly infringing use has had on the copyright owner's ability to exploit his original work. The court not only investigates whether the defendant's specific use of the work has significantly harmed the copyright owner's market, but also whether such uses in general, if widespread, would harm the potential market of the original. The burden of proof here rests on the copyright owner, who must demonstrate the impact of the infringement on commercial use of the work.

For example, in Sony Corp v. Universal City Studios, the copyright owner, Universal, failed to provide any empirical evidence that the use of Betamax had either reduced their viewership or negatively impacted their business. In Harper & Row, the case regarding President Ford's memoirs, the Supreme Court labeled the fourth factor "the single most important element of fair use" and it has enjoyed some level of primacy in fair use analyses ever since. Yet the Supreme Court's more recent announcement in Campbell v. Acuff-Rose Music Inc that "all [four factors] are to be explored, and the results weighed together, in light of the purposes of copyright" has helped modulate this emphasis in interpretation.

In evaluating the fourth factor, courts often consider two kinds of harm to the potential market for the original work.

- First, courts consider whether the use in question acts as a direct market substitute for the original work. In Campbell, the Supreme Court stated that "when a commercial use amounts to mere duplication of the entirety of the original, it clearly supersedes the object of the original and serves as a market replacement for it, making it likely that cognizable market harm to the original will occur". In one instance, a court ruled that this factor weighed against a defendant who had made unauthorized movie trailers for video retailers, since his trailers acted as direct substitutes for the copyright owner's official trailers.
- Second, courts also consider whether potential market harm might exist beyond that of direct substitution, such as in the potential existence of a licensing market. This consideration has weighed against commercial copy shops that make copies of articles in course-packs for college students, when a market already existed for the licensing of course-pack copies.

Courts recognize that certain kinds of market harm do not negate fair use, such as when a parody or negative review impairs the market of the original work. Copyright considerations may not shield a work against adverse criticism.

=== Additional factors ===
As explained by Judge Leval, courts are permitted to include additional factors in their analysis.

One such factor is acknowledgement of the copyrighted source. Giving the name of the photographer or author may help, but it does not automatically make a use fair. While plagiarism and copyright infringement are related matters, they are not identical. Plagiarism (using someone's words, ideas, images, etc. without acknowledgment) is a matter of professional ethics, while copyright is a matter of law, and protects exact expression, not ideas. One can plagiarize even a work that is not protected by copyright, for example by passing off a line from Shakespeare as one's own. Conversely, attribution prevents accusations of plagiarism, but it does not prevent infringement of copyright. For example, reprinting a copyrighted book without permission, while citing the original author, would be copyright infringement but not plagiarism.

=== Procedure and practice ===
The U.S. Supreme Court described fair use as an affirmative defense in Campbell v. Acuff-Rose Music, Inc. This means that in litigation on copyright infringement, the defendant bears the burden of raising and proving that the use was fair and not an infringement. Thus, fair use need not even be raised as a defense unless the plaintiff first shows (or the defendant concedes) a prima facie case of copyright infringement. If the work was not copyrightable, the term had expired, or the defendant's work borrowed only a small amount, for instance, then the plaintiff cannot make out a prima facie case of infringement, and the defendant need not even raise the fair use defense. In addition, fair use is only one of many limitations, exceptions, and defenses to copyright infringement. Thus, a prima facie case can be defeated without relying on fair use. For instance, the Audio Home Recording Act establishes that it is legal, using certain technologies, to make copies of audio recordings for non-commercial personal use.

Some copyright owners claim infringement even in circumstances where the fair use defense would likely succeed, in hopes that the user will refrain from the use rather than spending resources in their defense. Strategic lawsuit against public participation (SLAPP) cases that allege copyright infringement, patent infringement, defamation, or libel may come into conflict with the defendant's right to freedom of speech, and that possibility has prompted some jurisdictions to pass anti-SLAPP legislation that raises the plaintiff's burdens and risk.

Although fair use ostensibly permits certain uses without liability, many content creators and publishers try to avoid a potential court battle by seeking a legally unnecessary license from copyright owners for any use of non-public domain material, even in situations where a fair use defense would likely succeed. The simple reason is that the license terms negotiated with the copyright owner may be much less expensive than defending against a copyright suit, or having the mere possibility of a lawsuit threaten the publication of a work in which a publisher has invested significant resources.

Fair use rights take precedence over the author's interest. Thus the copyright holder cannot use a non-binding disclaimer, or notification, to revoke the right of fair use on works. However, binding agreements such as contracts or licence agreements may take precedence over fair use rights.

The practical effect of the fair use doctrine is that a number of conventional uses of copyrighted works are not considered infringing. For instance, quoting from a copyrighted work in order to criticize or comment upon it or teach students about it, is considered a fair use. Certain well-established uses cause few problems. A teacher who prints a few copies of a poem to illustrate a technique will have no problem on all four of the above factors (except possibly on amount and substantiality), but some cases are not so clear. All the factors are considered and balanced in each case: a book reviewer who quotes a paragraph as an example of the author's style will probably fall under fair use even though they may sell their review commercially; but a non-profit educational website that reproduces whole articles from technical magazines will probably be found to infringe if the publisher can demonstrate that the website affects the market for the magazine, even though the website itself is non-commercial.

Fair use is decided on a case-by-case basis, on the entirety of circumstances. The same act done by different means or for a different purpose can gain or lose fair use status.

== Fair use in particular areas ==
=== Computer code ===
Google LLC v. Oracle America, Inc. 593 U.S. 1 (2021) focused on the use of application programming interfaces (APIs) used to define functionality of the Java programming language. Java was created by Sun Microsystems, since acquired by Oracle. Early versions of the Android operating system, later acquired by Google, was developed using the Java APIs and segments of its source code. Oracle sued Google for copyright violations of its Java API and code. Prior to the Supreme Court, the case was first heard in two phases at lower courts. In the first phase, the courts ruled that the APIs themselves were not copyrightable though the underlying code to support them was copyrightable, leaving some of Oracle's copyright violation claims in place. In the second phase, lower courts did not consider Google's use of the Java source code to be within fair use. Google took its case to the Supreme Court, which ruled in 2021 on a 6-2 vote that Google's minimal use of the Java code fell within fair use. Justice Stephen Breyer wrote the majority, saying that Google used "only what was needed to allow users to put their accrued talents to work in a new and transformative program". Had the ruling been against Google, some computer experts feared that it would have significant ramifications for ongoing computer development, particularly in the area of open source code development where programmers develop clean room equivalents of commercial works using published API code.

=== Documentary films ===
In April 2006, the filmmakers of the Loose Change series were served with a lawsuit by Jules and Gédéon Naudet over the film's use of their footage, specifically footage of the firefighters discussing the collapse of the World Trade Center. With the help of an intellectual property lawyer, the creators of Loose Change successfully argued that a majority of the footage used was for historical purposes and was significantly transformed in the context of the film. They agreed to remove a few shots that were used as B-roll and served no purpose to the greater discussion. The case was settled and a potential multimillion-dollar lawsuit was avoided.

This Film Is Not Yet Rated also relied on fair use to feature several clips from copyrighted Hollywood productions. The director had originally planned to license these clips from their studio owners but discovered that studio licensing agreements would have prohibited him from using this material to criticize the entertainment industry. This prompted him to invoke the fair use doctrine, which permits limited use of copyrighted material to provide analysis and criticism of published works.

=== File sharing ===
In 2009, fair use was invoked as a defense in lawsuits against filesharing. Charles Nesson argued that file-sharing qualifies as fair use in his defense of alleged filesharer Joel Tenenbaum. Kiwi Camara, defending alleged filesharer Jammie Thomas, announced a similar defense. However, the Court in the case at bar rejected the idea that file-sharing is fair use.

=== Internet publication ===
A U.S. court case from 2003, Kelly v. Arriba Soft Corp., provides and develops the relationship between thumbnails, inline linking, and fair use. In the lower District Court case on a motion for summary judgment, Arriba Soft's use of thumbnail pictures and inline linking from Kelly's website in Arriba Soft's image search engine was found not to be fair use. That decision was appealed and contested by Internet rights activists such as the Electronic Frontier Foundation, who argued that it was fair use.

On appeal, the Ninth Circuit Court of Appeals found in favor of the defendant, Arriba Soft. In reaching its decision, the court utilized the statutory four-factor analysis. First, it found the purpose of creating the thumbnail images as previews to be sufficiently transformative, noting that they were not meant to be viewed at high resolution as the original artwork was. Second, the photographs had already been published, diminishing the significance of their nature as creative works. Third, although normally making a "full" replication of a copyrighted work may appear to violate copyright, here it was found to be reasonable and necessary in light of the intended use. Lastly, the court found that the market for the original photographs would not be substantially diminished by the creation of the thumbnails. To the contrary, the thumbnail searches could increase the exposure of the originals. In looking at all these factors as a whole, the court found that the thumbnails were fair use and remanded the case to the lower court for trial after issuing a revised opinion on July 7, 2003. The remaining issues were resolved with a default judgment after Arriba Soft had experienced significant financial problems and failed to reach a negotiated settlement.

In August 2008, Judge Jeremy Fogel of the Northern District of California ruled during Lenz v. Universal Music Corp. about "fair use" Internet publications using copyrighted material. It involved a YouTube video that sampled "Let's Go Crazy". On appeal, the Court of Appeals for the Ninth Circuit ruled that a copyright owner must affirmatively consider whether the complained of conduct constituted fair use before sending a takedown notice under the Digital Millennium Copyright Act, rather than waiting for the alleged infringer to assert fair use. 801 F.3d 1126 (9th Cir. 2015). "Even if, as Universal urges, fair use is classified as an 'affirmative defense,' we hold—for the purposes of the DMCA—fair use is uniquely situated in copyright law so as to be treated differently than traditional affirmative defenses. We conclude that because 17 U.S.C. § 107 created a type of non-infringing use, fair use is "authorized by the law" and a copyright holder must consider the existence of fair use before sending a takedown notification under § 512(c)."

In June 2011, Judge Philip Pro of the District of Nevada ruled in Righthaven v. Hoehn that the posting of an entire editorial article from the Las Vegas Review-Journal in a comment as part of an online discussion was unarguably fair use. Judge Pro noted that "Noncommercial, nonprofit use is presumptively fair. ... Hoehn posted the Work as part of an online discussion. ... This purpose is consistent with comment, for which 17 U.S.C. § 107 provides fair use protection. ... It is undisputed that Hoehn posted the entire work in his comment on the Website. ... wholesale copying does not preclude a finding of fair use. ... there is no genuine issue of material fact that Hoehn's use of the Work was fair and summary judgment is appropriate." On appeal, the Court of Appeals for the Ninth Circuit ruled that Righthaven did not even have the standing needed to sue Hoehn for copyright infringement in the first place.

=== Professional communities ===
In addition to considering the four fair use factors, courts deciding fair use cases also look to the standards and practices of the professional community where the case comes from. Among the communities are documentarians, librarians, makers of Open Courseware, visual art educators, and communications professors.

Such codes of best practices have permitted communities of practice to make more informed risk assessments in employing fair use in their daily practice. For instance, broadcasters, cablecasters, and distributors typically require filmmakers to obtain errors and omissions insurance before the distributor will take on the film. Such insurance protects against errors and omissions made during the copyright clearance of material in the film. Before the Documentary Filmmakers' Statement of Best Practices in Fair Use was created in 2005, it was nearly impossible to obtain errors and omissions insurance for copyright clearance work that relied in part on fair use. This meant documentarians had either to obtain a license for the material or to cut it from their films. In many cases, it was impossible to license the material because the filmmaker sought to use it in a critical way. Soon after the best practices statement was released, all errors and omissions insurers in the U.S. shifted to begin offering routine fair use coverage.

=== Music sampling ===
Before 1991, sampling in certain genres of music was accepted practice and the copyright considerations were viewed as largely irrelevant. The strict decision against rapper Biz Markie's appropriation of a Gilbert O'Sullivan song in the case Grand Upright Music, Ltd. v. Warner Bros. Records Inc. changed practices and opinions overnight. Samples now had to be licensed, as long as they rose "to a level of legally cognizable appropriation". This left the door open for the de minimis doctrine, for short or unrecognizable samples; such uses would not rise to the level of copyright infringement, because under the de minimis doctrine, "the law does not care about trifles". However, in 2004, the Sixth Circuit effectively eliminated the de minimis doctrine in the Bridgeport Music, Inc. v. Dimension Films case, holding that artists must "get a license or do not sample". The Court later clarified that its opinion did not apply to fair use, but between Grand Upright and Bridgeport, practice had effectively shifted to eliminate unlicensed sampling.

=== Parody ===
Producers or creators of parodies of a copyrighted work have been sued for infringement by the targets of their ridicule, even though such use may be protected as fair use. These fair use cases distinguish between parodies, which use a work in order to poke fun at or comment on the work itself, and satire, which comments on something else. Courts have been more willing to grant fair use protections to parodies than to satires, but the ultimate outcome in either circumstance will turn on the application of the four fair use factors.

For example, when Tom Forsythe appropriated Barbie dolls for his photography project "Food Chain Barbie" (depicting several copies of the doll naked and disheveled and about to be baked in an oven, blended in a food mixer, and the like), Mattel lost its copyright infringement lawsuit against him because his work effectively parodies Barbie and the values she represents. In Rogers v. Koons, Jeff Koons tried to justify his appropriation of Art Rogers' photograph "Puppies" in his sculpture "String of Puppies" with the same parody defense. Koons lost because his work was not presented as a parody of Rogers' photograph in particular, but as a satire of society at large. This was insufficient to render the use fair.

In Campbell v. Acuff-Rose Music Inc the U.S. Supreme Court recognized parody as a potential fair use, even when done for profit. Roy Orbison's, Acuff-Rose Music, had sued 2 Live Crew in 1989 for their use of Orbison's "Oh, Pretty Woman" in a mocking rap version with altered lyrics. The Supreme Court viewed 2 Live Crew's version as a ridiculing commentary on the earlier work, and ruled that when the parody was itself the product rather than mere advertising, commercial nature did not bar the defense. The Campbell court also distinguished parodies from satire, which they described as a broader social critique not intrinsically tied to ridicule of a specific work and so not deserving of the same use exceptions as parody because the satirist's ideas are capable of expression without the use of the other particular work.

A number of appellate decisions have recognized that a parody may be a protected fair use, including the Second (Leibovitz v. Paramount Pictures Corp.); the Ninth (Mattel v. Walking Mountain Productions); and the Eleventh Circuits (Suntrust Bank v. Houghton Mifflin Co.). In the 2001 Suntrust Bank case, Suntrust Bank and the Margaret Mitchell estate unsuccessfully brought suit to halt the publication of The Wind Done Gone, which reused many of the characters and situations from Gone with the Wind but told the events from the point of view of the enslaved people rather than the slaveholders. The Eleventh Circuit, applying Campbell, found that The Wind Done Gone was fair use and vacated the district court's injunction against its publication.

Cases in which a satirical use was found to be fair include Blanch v. Koons and Williams v. Columbia Broadcasting Systems.

=== Text and data mining ===
The transformative nature of computer based analytical processes such as text mining, web mining and data mining has led many to form the view that such uses would be protected under fair use. This view was substantiated by the rulings of Judge Denny Chin in Authors Guild, Inc. v. Google, Inc., a case involving mass digitisation of millions of books from research library collections. As part of the ruling that found the book digitisation project was fair use, the judge stated "Google Books is also transformative in the sense that it has transformed book text into data for purposes of substantive research, including data mining and text mining in new areas".

Text and data mining was subject to further review in Authors Guild v. HathiTrust, a case derived from the same digitization project mentioned above. Judge Harold Baer, in finding that the defendant's uses were transformative, stated that "the search capabilities of the [HathiTrust Digital Library] have already given rise to new methods of academic inquiry such as text mining".

=== Artificial intelligence training ===
As of September 2025, there seems to be no country where legislative acts regulating copyright status of AI-generated materials have been passed, and the United States is the only country where courts of first instance reached decisions in a small number of cases with many more lawsuits pending. In a case of a non-generative AI model a court rejected a fair use defense in 2024 (see Thomson Reuters v. Ross Intelligence), while a generative AI model was found to be was a "spectacularly transformative" fair use in Bartz v. Anthropic in 2025. Nevertheless, the circumstances of the two cases are rather different to allow for a generalization. In its May 2025 report, the United States Copyright Office expressed skepticism that all AI training is a transformative fair use, particularly when done commercially and resulting in outputs that compete with original works. The USCO also stated that analogizing AI training to human learning is "mistaken".

=== Reverse engineering ===
There is a substantial body of fair use law regarding reverse engineering of computer software, hardware, network protocols, encryption and access control systems.

=== Social media ===
In May 2015, artist Richard Prince released an exhibit of photographs at the Gagosian Gallery in New York, entitled "New Portraits". His exhibit consisted of screenshots of Instagram users' pictures, which were largely unaltered, with Prince's commentary added beneath. Although no Instagram users authorized Prince to use their pictures, Prince argued that the addition of his own commentary the pictures constituted fair use, such that he did not need permission to use the pictures or to pay royalties for his use. One of the pieces sold for $90,000. With regard to the works presented by Painter, the gallery where the pictures were showcased posted notices that "All images are subject to copyright." Several lawsuits were filed against Painter over the New Portraits exhibit. In 2024, Richard Prince and the galleries were ordered to pay $900,000 to the photographers.

== Influence internationally ==
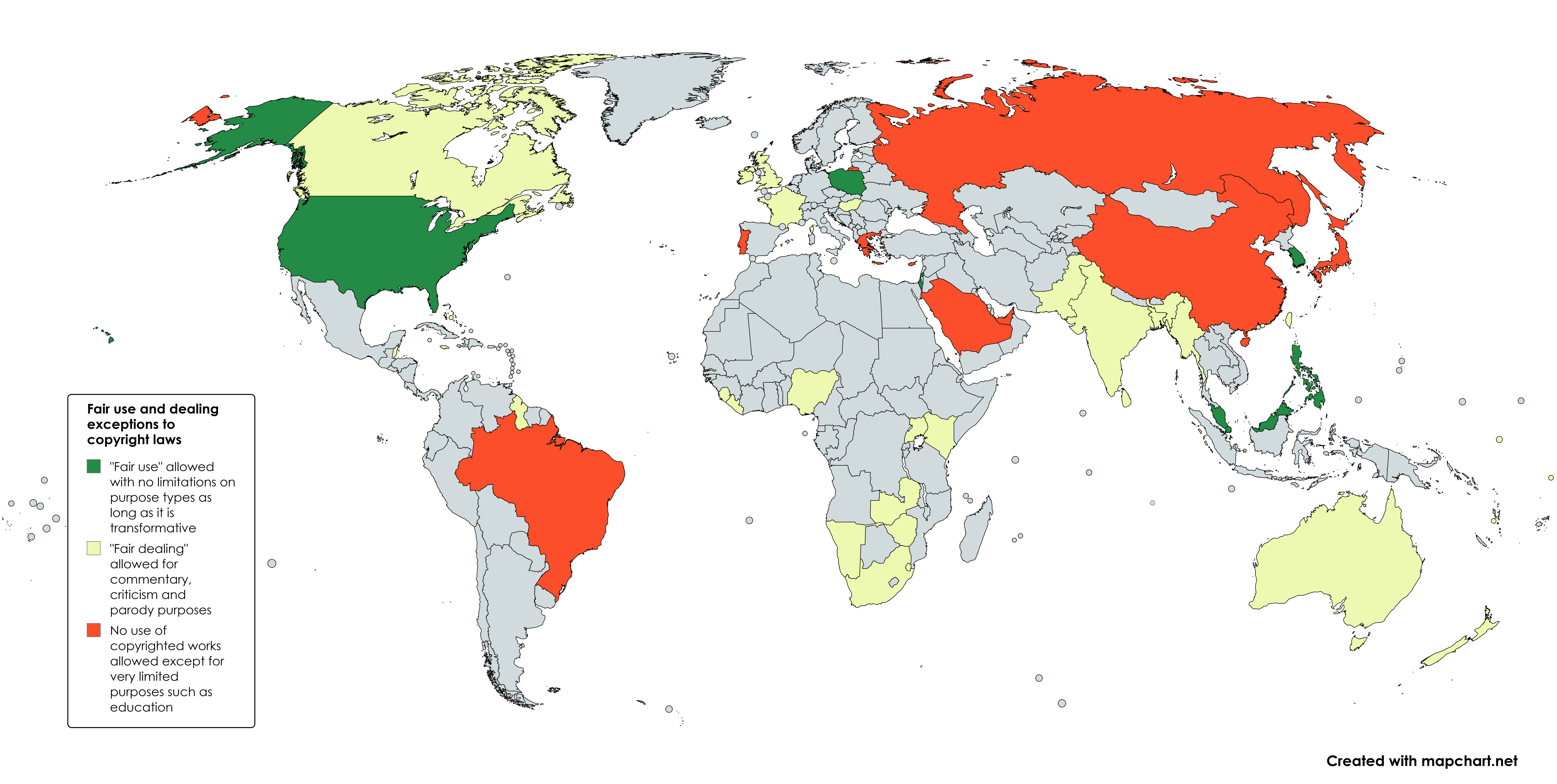
Fair use and dealing exceptions to copyright laws

While U.S. fair use law has been influential in some countries, some countries have fair use criteria drastically different from those in the U.S., and some countries do not have a fair use framework at all. Some countries have the concept of fair dealing instead of fair use, while others use different systems of limitations and exceptions to copyright. Many countries have some reference to an exemption for educational use, though the extent of this exemption varies widely.

Sources differ on whether fair use is fully recognized by countries other than the United States. American University's infojustice.org published a compilation of portions of over 40 nations' laws that explicitly mention fair use or fair dealing, and asserts that some of the fair dealing laws, such as Canada's, have evolved (such as through judicial precedents) to be quite close to those of the United States. This compilation includes fair use provisions from Bangladesh, Israel, South Korea, the Philippines, Sri Lanka, Taiwan, Uganda, and the United States. However, the 2009 release of International Copyright Law and Practice says that while some other countries recognize similar exceptions to copyright, only the United States and Israel fully recognize the concept of fair use.

The International Intellectual Property Alliance (IIPA), a lobby group of U.S. copyright industry bodies, has objected to international adoption of U.S.-style fair use exceptions, alleging that such laws have a dependency on common law and long-term legal precedent that may not exist outside the United States.

=== Israel ===
In November 2007, the Israeli Knesset passed a new copyright law that included a U.S.-style fair use exception. The law, which took effect in May 2008, permits the fair use of copyrighted works for purposes such as private study, research, criticism, review, news reporting, quotation, or instruction or testing by an educational institution. The law sets up four factors, similar to the U.S. fair use factors (see above), for determining whether a use is fair.

On September 2, 2009, the Tel Aviv District court ruled in The Football Association Premier League Ltd. v. Ploni that fair use is a user right. The court also ruled that streaming of live soccer games on the Internet is fair use. In doing so, the court analyzed the four fair use factors adopted in 2007 and cited U.S. case law, including Kelly v. Arriba Soft Corp. and Perfect 10, Inc. v. Amazon.com, Inc..

=== Malaysia ===
An amendment in 2012 to the section 13(2)(a) of the Copyright Act 1987 created an exception called 'fair dealing' which is not restricted in its purpose. The four factors for fair use as specified in US law are included.

=== Poland ===
Fair use (Polish: dozwolony użytek, lit. 'allowed use') exists in Polish law and is covered by the Polish copyright law articles 23 to 35.

Compared to the United States, Polish fair use distinguishes between private and public use. In Poland, when the use is public, its use risks fines. The defendant must also prove that his use was private when accused that it was not, or that other mitigating circumstances apply. Finally, Polish law treats all cases in which private material was made public as a potential copyright infringement, where fair use can apply, but has to be proven by reasonable circumstances.

=== Singapore ===
Section 35 of the Singaporean Copyright Act 1987 has been amended in 2004 to allow a 'fair dealing' exception for any purpose. The four fair use factors similar to US law are included in the new section 35.

=== South Korea ===
The Korean Copyright Act was amended to include a fair use provision, Article 35–3, in 2012. The law outlines a four-factor test similar to that used under U.S. law:

In determining whether art. 35-3(1) above applies to a use of copyrighted work, the following factors must be considered: the purpose and character of the use, including whether such use is of a commercial nature or is of a non profit nature; the type or purpose of the copyrighted work; the amount and importance of the portion used in relation to the copyrighted work as a whole; the effect of the use of the copyrighted work upon the current market or the current value of the copyrighted work or on the potential market or the potential value of the copyrighted work.

== Fair dealing ==
Fair dealing allows specific exceptions to copyright protections. The open-ended concept of fair use is generally not observed in jurisdictions where fair dealing is in place, although this does vary. Fair dealing is established in legislation in Australia, Canada, New Zealand, Singapore, India, South Africa and the United Kingdom, among others.

=== Australia ===
While Australian copyright exceptions are based on the Fair Dealing system, since 1998 a series of Australian government inquiries have examined, and in most cases recommended, the introduction of a "flexible and open" Fair Use system into Australian copyright law. From 1998 to 2017 there have been eight Australian government inquiries which have considered the question of whether fair use should be adopted in Australia. Six reviews have recommended Australia adopt a "Fair Use" model of copyright exceptions: two enquiries specifically into the Copyright Act (1998, 2014); and four broader reviews (both 2004, 2013, 2016). One review (2000) recommended against the introduction of fair use and another (2005) issued no final report. Two of the recommendations were specifically in response to the stricter copyright rules introduced as part of the Australia–United States Free Trade Agreement (AUSFTA), while the most recent two, by the Australian Law Reform Commission (ALRC) and the Productivity Commission (PC) were with reference to strengthening Australia's "digital economy".

=== Canada ===
The Copyright Act of Canada establishes fair dealing in Canada, which allows specific exceptions to copyright protection. In 1985, the Sub-Committee on the Revision of Copyright rejected replacing fair dealing with an open-ended system, and in 1986 the Canadian government agreed that "the present fair dealing provisions should not be replaced by the substantially wider 'fair use' concept". Since then, the Canadian fair dealing exception has broadened. It is now similar in effect to U.S. fair use, even though the frameworks are different.

CCH Canadian Ltd v. Law Society of Upper Canada [2004] 1 S.C.R. 339,2004 SCC 13 is a landmark Supreme Court of Canada case that establishes the bounds of fair dealing in Canadian copyright law. The Law Society of Upper Canada was sued for copyright infringement for providing photocopy services to researchers. The Court unanimously held that the Law Society's practice fell within the bounds of fair dealing.

=== United Kingdom ===
Within the United Kingdom, fair dealing is a legal doctrine that provides an exception to the nation's copyright law in cases where the copyright infringement is for the purposes of non-commercial research or study, criticism or review, or for the reporting of current events.

== Policy arguments ==
A balanced copyright law provides an economic benefit to many high-tech businesses such as search engines and software developers. Fair use is also crucial to non-technology industries such as insurance, legal services, and newspaper publishers.

On September 12, 2007, the Computer and Communications Industry Association (CCIA), a group representing companies including Google Inc., Microsoft Inc., Oracle Corporation, Sun Microsystems, Yahoo! and other high-tech companies, released a study that found that fair use exceptions to US copyright laws were responsible for more than $4.5 trillion in annual revenue for the United States economy representing one-sixth of the total US GDP. The study was conducted using a methodology developed by the World Intellectual Property Organization.

The study found that fair use dependent industries are directly responsible for more than eighteen percent of US economic growth and nearly eleven million American jobs. "As the United States economy becomes increasingly knowledge-based, the concept of fair use can no longer be discussed and legislated in the abstract. It is the very foundation of the digital age and a cornerstone of our economy," said Ed Black, President and CEO of CCIA. "Much of the unprecedented economic growth of the past ten years can actually be credited to the doctrine of fair use, as the Internet itself depends on the ability to use content in a limited and unlicensed manner."

== Fair Use Week ==
Fair Use Week is an international event that celebrates fair use and fair dealing. Fair Use Week was first proposed on a Fair Use Allies mailing list, which was an outgrowth of the Library Code of Best Practices Capstone Event, celebrating the development and promulgation of ARL's Code of Best Practices in Fair Use for Academic and Research Libraries. While the idea was not taken up nationally, Copyright Advisor at Harvard University, launched the first ever Fair Use Week at Harvard University in February 2014, with a full week of activities celebrating fair use. The first Fair Use Week included blog posts from national and international fair use experts, live fair use panels, fair use workshops, and a Fair Use Stories Tumblr blog, where people from the world of art, music, film, and academia shared stories about the importance of fair use to their community. The first Fair Use Week was so successful that in 2015 ARL teamed up with Courtney and helped organize the Second Annual Fair Use Week, with participation from many more institutions. ARL also launched an official Fair Use Week website, which was transferred from Pia Hunter, who attended the Library Code of Best Practices Capstone Event and had originally purchased the domain name fairuseweek.org.

== See also ==
- Abandonware
- Berne three-step test
- Copyright limitations, exceptions, and defenses in the U.S.
- Copyfraud
- Copyleft
- Creative Commons
- Derivative work
- Fair use (U.S. trademark law)
- The Polish concept of private fair use
- Scènes à faire doctrine
- TEACH Act, an additional law for educational and governmental institutions that provides some additional copyright exceptions
