= Folsom v. Marsh =

First "fair use" copyright case in the U.S.

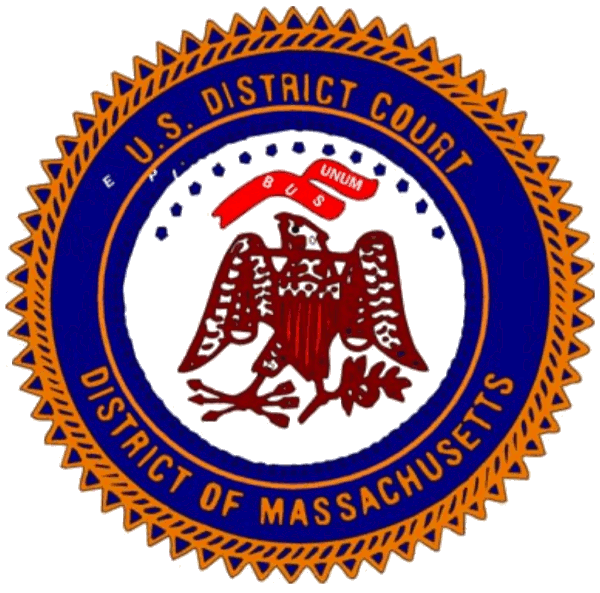
- Court: United States District Court for the District of Massachusetts
- Full case name: Folsom v. Marsh
- Decided: October 1841
- Citation: 9. F.Cas. 342

Court membership
- Judge sitting: Joseph Story

Case opinions
- judgment was entered for plaintiff

Keywords
- copyright infringement, fair use

Folsom v. Marsh, 9. F.Cas. 342 (C.C.D. Mass. 1841), is a 19th-century US copyright case, widely regarded as the first "fair use" case in the United States. The opinion was written by Judge Joseph Story, who set forth four factors that are in use today, and were ultimately codified in the Copyright Act of 1976 as 17 U.S.C. § 107.

== Background ==
The Reverend Charles Wentworth Upham, a writer and anthologist, had copied 353 pages from the plaintiff's 12-volume biography of George Washington in order to produce a separate two-volume work of his own. The work was published by Bela Marsh, of Marsh, Capen, and Lyon.

The publisher Charles Folsom, of Folsom, Wells and Thurston, who had published the first set of letters (a twelve-volume edition edited by Jared Sparks), sued for "piracy of the copyright". The defendant argued that the papers were not copyrightable because, as the letters of a deceased author, they were not private property and not "proper subjects of copyright"; that even if copyrightable, as works of the President they belonged to the United States; and lastly, that their use was fair, because it was the creation of an essentially new work.

Judge Story famously commented that,

Patents and copyrights approach, nearer than any other class of cases belonging to forensic discussions, to what may be called the metaphysics of law, where the distinctions are, or at least may be, very subtile and refined, and, sometimes, almost evanescent.

The court said first, that the letters were in fact copyrightable subject matter, and that taking even abridged and select portions could be infringement:

It is certainly not necessary, to constitute an invasion of copyright, that the whole of a work should be copied, or even a large portion of it, in form or in substance. If so much is taken, that the value of the original is sensibly diminished, or the labors of the original author are substantially to an injurious extent appropriated by another, that is sufficient, in point of law, to constitute a piracy pro tanto.

This holding effectively expanded copyrightable subject matter significantly, by permitting derivative works to be considered one of the rights of the copyright holder. At the time that Upham had created his collection, abridgments of existing works were not considered infringements.

Second, the court accepted the defendant's argument that uses could be fair, but rejected the claim that this particular use was fair. Justice Story thus destroyed the "abridgment doctrine", while establishing what has come to be known as the "fair use" doctrine. In so doing, the court set forth four factors: the "nature and objects of the selections made" (today characterized as the "purpose and character of the use"); the "quantity and value of the materials used" (described today as two factors: the nature of the original work, and the amount taken); and "the degree in which the use may prejudice the sale, or diminish the profits, or supersede the objects, of the original work".

[A] reviewer may fairly cite largely from the original work, if his design be really and truly to use the passages for the purposes of fair and reasonable criticism. On the other hand, it is as clear, that if he thus cites the most important parts of the work, with a view, not to criticize, but to supersede the use of the original work, and substitute the review for it, such a use will be deemed in law a piracy ...

In short, we must often ... look to the nature and objects of the selections made, the quantity and value of the materials used, and the degree in which the use may prejudice the sale, or diminish the profits, or supersede the objects, of the original work.

Judge Story drew these considerations in part from a body of English copyright law, as was common at that point.

Over the next century and a half, Folsom v. Marsh was repeatedly cited for its discussion of what uses might be fair, leading to the establishment of what has come to be known as the fair use doctrine. This doctrine was ultimately incorporated into the 1976 Copyright Act as 17 U.S.C. § 107. Although its formulation in Section 107 tracks very closely the iterations in modern case law, the factors themselves are essentially the same as set forth by Judge Story in 1841. Consequently, the Folsom v. Marsh case is regarded as establishing the principle of fair use in American copyright law.

Lyman Ray Patterson excoriated the decision as "the worst intellectual property opinion ever written", critiquing both Judge Story's logic and the outcome – the expansion of the copyright, and the shift in reasoning from a limited monopoly exception, towards a property rationale.

== See also ==
- Books in the United States

== Further research ==
- Full text PDF at Yale Law Tech
- David A. Kluft, "George Washington and the American Birth of Fair Use", Massachusetts Lawyers Weekly, Feb. 14, 2014. A revised version of the article is available at "A Presidents Day Copyright Story: George Washington and the "First" Fair Use Case", Foley Hoag Trademark & Copyright Law Blog, Feb. 21, 2014.
- Anthony R. Reese, "The Story of Folsom v. Marsh: Distinguishing Between Infringing and Legitimate Uses," in Intellectual Property Stories, eds. Jane C. Ginsburg and Rochelle Cooper Dreyfuss. New York: Foundation Press, 2006, 259.
- "Folsom v. Marsh", Primary Sources on Copyright (1450–1900) - Links to listed / cited people.
