= TEACH Act =

Act of the United States Congress

Technology, Education, and Copyright Harmonization Act of 2002
- Long title: An act to amend chapter 1 of title 17, United States Code, relating to the exemption of certain performances or displays for educational uses from copyright infringement provisions, to provide that the making of copies or phonorecords of such performances or displays is not an infringement under certain circumstances, and for other purposes.
- Acronyms (colloquial): TEACH Act
- Enacted by: the 107th United States Congress

Citations
- Public law: Pub. L. 107–273 (text) (PDF) § 13301
- Statutes at Large: 116 Stat. 1758 § 13301

Codification
- Titles amended: Title 17 of the United States Code
- U.S.C. sections amended: 17 U.S.C. § 110, § 112

Legislative history
- Introduced in the Senate as S.487 by Orrin Hatch (R–UT) on March 7, 2001; Passed the Senate on June 7, 2001 (unanimous consent); Passed the House as the 21st Century Department of Justice Appropriations Authorization Act, H.R.2215, § 13301 on July 23, 2001 (voice vote) with amendment; Senate agreed to House amendment on December 20, 2001 (unanimous consent) with further amendment; House agreed to Senate amendment on September 26, 2002 (400 - 4); Signed into law by President George W. Bush on November 2, 2002

The Technology, Education and Copyright Harmonization Act of 2002 (part of Public Law 107-273), known as the TEACH Act, is a section of an Act of the United States Congress. The importance of the TEACH Act stems from the previous copyright laws that allow educators to copy documents or use copyrighted materials in a face-to-face classroom setting. Because of the growth of distance education that does not contain a face-to-face classroom setting revisions to these laws, particularly sections 110(2) and 112(f) of the U.S. Copyright Act, were needed.

Signed into law by President George W. Bush on November 2, 2002 the TEACH Act clarifies what uses are permissible with regard to distance education. Furthermore, the TEACH Act outlines what requirements the information technology staff and students of a university must abide by in order to be in compliance with the TEACH Act.

While in some cases Fair Use Doctrine covers compliance to copyright law, the TEACH Act clarifies what compliance measures must be implemented with regard to distance education. This Act permits teachers and students of accredited, nonprofit educational institutions to transmit performances and displays of copyrighted works as part of a course if certain conditions are met. If these conditions are not or cannot be met, in order to be lawful, a use would arguably have to qualify under another exception, such as fair use or the de minimis rule, or be permitted by the copyright holder.

== Requirements ==
1. The benefits of the TEACH Act apply only to a "government body or accredited nonprofit educational institution."
2. The educational institution must "institute policies regarding copyright."
3. The institution must "provide informational materials" regarding copyright. These materials must "accurately describe, and promote compliance with, the laws of United States relating to copyright."
4. In addition to the general distribution of informational materials, the institution must provide "notice to students that materials used in connection with the course may be subject to copyright protection."
5. The transmission of content must be made "solely for . . . students officially enrolled in the course for which the transmission is made."

== Benefits ==
Before the TEACH Act was signed into law educators and students were at a disadvantage with respect to the materials they were allowed to use and the way in which these documents were presented through the online learning environment. The TEACH Act made copyright laws regarding distance learning closer to the laws provided for face-to-face classrooms though there are still important differences (especially regarding full-length audiovisual works, such as movies and documentaries). Some of these benefits include:

- Instructors may use a wider range of works in distance learning environments.
- Students may participate in distance learning sessions from virtually any location
- Participants enjoy greater latitude when it comes to storing, copying and digitizing materials.
