= Campbell v. Acuff-Rose Music, Inc. =

- Supreme Court of the United States

Argued November 9, 1993 Decided March 7, 1994
- Full case name: Luther R. Campbell a.k.a. Luke Skyywalker, et al., Petitioners v. Acuff-Rose Music, Incorporated
- Citations: 510 U.S. 569 (more) 114 S. Ct. 1164; 127 L. Ed. 2d 500; 1994 U.S. LEXIS 2052
- Argument: Oral argument

Case history
- Prior: 754 F. Supp. 1150 (M.D. Tenn.), appeal dismissed, 929 F.2d 700 (6th Cir. 1991) (table) (text at 1991 WL 43927), rev'd, 972 F.2d 1429 (6th Cir. 1992), cert. granted, 507 U.S. 1003 (1993)
- Subsequent: 25 F.3d 297 (6th Cir. 1994)

Holding
- The commercial nature of a parody does not render it a presumptively unfair use of copyrighted material. Rather, a parody's commercial character is only one element that should be weighed in a fair use inquiry.

Court membership
- Chief Justice William Rehnquist Associate Justices Harry Blackmun · John P. Stevens; Sandra Day O'Connor · Antonin Scalia; Anthony Kennedy · David Souter; Clarence Thomas · Ruth Bader Ginsburg

Case opinions
- Majority: Souter, joined by unanimous
- Concurrence: Kennedy

Laws applied
- Copyright Act of 1976; 17 U.S.C. §§ 101, 107 (1988)

Campbell v. Acuff-Rose Music, Inc., 510 U.S. 569 (1994), was a United States Supreme Court copyright law case that established that a commercial parody can qualify as fair use. This case established that the fact that money is made by a work does not make it impossible for fair use to apply; it is merely one of the components of a fair use analysis.

== History ==
The members of the rap music group 2 Live Crew—Luke Skyywalker (Luther Campbell), Fresh Kid Ice, Mr. Mixx and Brother Marquis—composed a song called "Pretty Woman," a parody based on Roy Orbison's rock ballad, "Oh, Pretty Woman." The group's manager asked Acuff-Rose Music if they could get a license to use Orbison's tune for the ballad to be used as a parody. Acuff-Rose Music refused to grant the band a license but 2 Live Crew nonetheless produced and released the parody.

Almost a year later, after nearly a quarter of a million copies of the recording had been sold, Acuff-Rose sued 2 Live Crew and its record company, Luke Skyywalker Records, for copyright infringement. A federal district court in Nashville, Tennessee granted summary judgment for 2 Live Crew, reasoning that the commercial purpose of the parody did not bar it from fair use under section 107 of the Copyright Act of 1976 (17 U.S.C. § 107). The ruling pointed out that 2 Live Crew's parody "quickly degenerates" from the original and only used no more than was necessary of the original to create the parody. For those reasons, the court decided it was "extremely unlikely that 2 Live Crew's song could adversely affect the market for the original." The United States Court of Appeals for the Sixth Circuit reversed and remanded, holding that the commercial nature of the parody rendered it presumptively unfair under the first of four factors relevant under § 107; that, by taking the "heart" of the original and making it the "heart" of a new work, 2 Live Crew had taken too much under the third § 107 factor; and that market harm for purposes of the fourth § 107 factor had been established by a presumption attaching to commercial uses.

== Holding ==
The Supreme Court held that 2 Live Crew's commercial parody may be a fair use within the meaning of § 107.

Justice Souter began by describing the inherent tension created by the need to simultaneously protect copyrighted material and allow others to build upon it, quoting Lord Ellenborough: "While I shall think myself bound to secure every man in the enjoyment of his copyright, one must not put manacles upon science."

The Court elaborated on this tension, looking to Justice Story's analysis in Folsom v. Marsh, 9 F. Cas. 342 (C.C.D. Mass. 1841), where he stated, "look to the nature and objects of the selections made, the quantity and value of the materials used, and the degree in which the use may prejudice the sale, or diminish the profits, or supersede the objects, of the original work." This analysis was eventually codified in the Copyright Act of 1976 in § 107 as follows:

Notwithstanding the provisions of sections 106 and 106A, the fair use of a copyrighted work, including such use by reproduction in copies or phonorecords or by any other means specified by that section, for purposes such as criticism, comment, news reporting, teaching (including multiple copies for classroom use), scholarship, or research, is not an infringement of copyright. In determining whether the use made of a work in any particular case is a fair use the factors to be considered shall include—

(1) the purpose and character of the use, including whether such use is of a commercial nature or is for nonprofit educational purposes;
(2) the nature of the copyrighted work;
(3) the amount and substantiality of the portion used in relation to the copyrighted work as a whole; and

(4) the effect of the use upon the potential market for or value of the copyrighted work.

The Supreme Court then found the aforementioned factors must be applied to each situation on a case-by-case basis. '"The fact that parody can claim legitimacy for some appropriation does not, of course, tell either parodist or judge much about where to draw the line. Like a book review quoting the copyrighted material criticized, parody may or may not be fair use, and petitioner's suggestion that any parodic use is presumptively fair has no more justification in law or fact than the equally hopeful claim that any use for news reporting should be presumed fair."

When looking at the purpose and character of 2 Live Crew's use, the Court found that the more transformative the new work, the less significant the other three factors. The court found that, in any event, a work's commercial nature is only one element of the first factor enquiry into its purpose and character, quoting Sony Corp. of America v. Universal City Studios, Inc., 464 U.S. 417. The Supreme Court found the Court of Appeals analysis as running counter to this proposition.

Justice Souter then moved onto the second § 107 factor, "the nature of the copyrighted work", finding it has little merit in resolving this and other parody cases, since the artistic value of parodies is often found in their ability to invariably copy popular works of the past.

The Court did find the third factor integral to the analysis, finding that the Court of Appeals erred in holding that, as a matter of law, 2 Live Crew copied excessively from the Orbison original. Souter reasoned that the "amount and substantiality" of the portion used by 2 Live Crew was reasonable in relation to the band's purpose in creating a parody of "Oh, Pretty Woman". The majority reasoned "even if 2 Live Crew's copying of the original's first line of lyrics and characteristic opening bass riff may be said to go to the original's 'heart,' that heart is what most readily conjures up the song for parody, and it is the heart at which parody takes aim." The Supreme Court then looked to the new work as a whole, finding that 2 Live Crew thereafter departed markedly from the Orbison lyrics, producing otherwise distinctive music.

Looking at the final factor, the Supreme Court found that the Court of Appeals erred in finding a presumption or inference of market harm (such as there had been in Sony). Parodies in general, the Court said, will rarely substitute for the original work, since the two works serve different market functions. While Acuff-Rose found evidence of a potential "derivative" rap market in the very fact that 2 Live Crew recorded a rap parody of "Oh, Pretty Woman" and another rap group sought a license to record a rap derivative, the Court found no evidence that a potential rap market was harmed in any way by 2 Live Crew's parodic rap version. In fact, the Court found that it was unlikely that any artist would find parody a lucrative derivative market, noting that artists "ask for criticism, but only want praise."

The Supreme Court reversed the court of appeals and remanded the case. On remand, the parties settled the case out of court. According to press reports, under terms of the settlement, Acuff-Rose dismissed its lawsuit, and 2 Live Crew agreed to license the sale of its parody of the song. Although Acuff-Rose stated that it was paid under the settlement, the terms were not otherwise disclosed.

Notably, Justice Souter attached the lyrics of both songs as appendices to his majority opinion for the Court. As a result, both songs were reproduced in the United States Reports along with the rest of the opinion, and may now be found in every major American law library.

== See also ==
- Berlin v. E.C. Publications, Inc., 1964 Second Circuit decision protecting publication of parody lyrics to copyrights songs
- Deckmyn v Vandersteen, 2014 European Court of Justice decision on when parodies can be considered derivative works
- List of United States Supreme Court cases, volume 510
