= Kelly v. Arriba Soft Corp. =

Kelly v. Arriba Soft Corporation
- Court: United States Court of Appeals for the Ninth Circuit
- Full case name: Leslie A. Kelly et al v. Arriba Soft Corporation
- Argued: September 10, 2001
- Decided: February 6, 2002
- Citations: 280 F.3d 934 (9th Cir. 2002) withdrawn, re-filed at 336 F.3d 811 (9th Cir. 2003)

Case history
- Prior history: 77 F.Supp.2d 1116 (C.D. Cal. 1999)

Court membership
- Judges sitting: Betty Binns Fletcher, Thomas G. Nelson, Marsha Berzon

Case opinions
- Majority: Nelson, joined by Fletcher, Berzon

Kelly v. Arriba Soft Corporation, 280 F.3d 934 (9th Cir. 2002) withdrawn, re-filed at 336 F.3d 811 (9th Cir. 2003), is a U.S. court case between a commercial photographer and a search engine company. During the case, ownership of Arriba Soft changed to Sorceron, the operator of the Internet search engine Ditto.com. The court found that US search engines may use thumbnails of images (size limits not determined), though the issue of inline linking to full size images instead of going to the original site was not resolved.

== Facts ==
The plaintiff Kelly sold pictures to various publications from his web site. The defendants Arriba Soft Inc. and its CEO Michael J. Lyons ran a search engine. Defendant Arriba's search engine indexed pictures from the web so that web users could conduct image searches. The search engine returns a set of postage stamp-size image thumbnails that relate directly to the specific term searched on. Kelly's pictures appeared as thumbnails on defendants' search engine along with millions of other thumbnail images from all over the web. Clicking on the thumbnails from Kelly's website would connect the user with Kelly's website via a deep link. In addition to the display, a postage stamp size thumbnail image the user could also link to the full picture in a new web browser window. The thumbnail image was stored on Arriba's system, but the full picture was not stored in Arriba's system. The picture is displayed on the user's screen as a "thumbnail", and if the full picture was linked to by the user then it was presented in a frame environment provided by Arriba. Kelly sued Arriba for copyright infringement for both use of the thumbnail image and use of the full image.

== Case history ==
The United States District Court for the Central District of California, Gary L. Taylor, J., 77 F.Supp. 2d 1116, granted summary judgment for search engine operator based on finding of fair use and owner appealed.

In 2002, the Ninth Circuit United States Court of Appeals in San Francisco, California affirmed the District Court's holding that thumbnails were prima facie infringing Kelly's copyright, but that the fair use doctrine permitted the use of the thumbnails in the image index. It upheld the right of image search engines to display thumbnail copies of images within their search results. However, the Circuit Court overturned a portion of the lower court summary judgment ruling in favor of the defendant, holding that fair use did not permit the inline linking or framing processes that displayed Kelly's images in the context of Arriba's web site.

On July 7, 2003, the Ninth Circuit modified its initial decision. The Court let stand the ruling about thumbnails and fair use but withdrew its decision on inline links and remanded the case to the District Court for trial, holding that the District Court had made a decision it shouldn't have made at that stage of the proceedings. On denial of rehearing and withdrawing and superseding its prior opinion, 280 F.3d 934, the Court of Appeals, T. G. Nelson, Circuit Judge, held that operator's use of owner's images as "thumbnails" in its search engine was fair use. 280 F.3d 934 (CA9 2002).

Kelly has posted online that after failure to reach a settlement, default judgment in his favor was obtained on the remaining issues on March 18, 2004. However, at that point the owner of the Arriba search engine (Sorceron Inc.) had gone out of business and there was no one for Kelly to settle with. With no one left to defend the case, Kelly managed to get a judgement against Arriba Soft Inc., an entity that no longer existed in any form.

Judgment shall be entered in favor of Plaintiff LESLIE A. KELLY, and individual and d/b/a LES KELLY PUBLICATIONS, LES KELLY ENTERPRISES, and SHOW ME THE GOLD and against Defendant ARRIBA SOFT CORPORATION, aka DITTO.COM in the sum of $345,000.00, plus reasonable attorney's fees in the sum of $6,068.20. s/Gary L. Taylor, UNITED STATES DISTRICT COURT JUDGE."

== Fair use analysis ==
Each of the courts that reviewed the summary judgment application conducted an analysis of the four factors which are stated in of the United States Copyright Act. What follows is the analysis done in the revised Ninth Circuit opinion of July 2003.

=== Purpose and character of the use ===
The use was found to be commercial and transformative, not of the same type as the original work, because the images were not being sold as pictures but were to facilitate the identification of the images in the search engine: "This first factor weighs in favor of Arriba's due to the public benefit of the search engine and the minimal loss of integrity to Kelly’s images."

=== Nature of the copyrighted work ===
The pictures are a published creative work available on the internet. A creative work favors a finding of infringement. As a published work, the use is more likely to be fair: "This factor weighs only slightly in favor of Kelly."

=== Amount and substantiality of portion used ===
The court found this factor to be neutral: "Copying an entire work militates against a finding of fair use ... If the secondary user only copies as much as is necessary for his or her intended use, then this factor will not weigh against him or her ... This factor neither weighs for nor against either party ... It was necessary for Arriba to copy the entire image to allow users to recognize the image and decide whether to pursue more information."

=== Effect of the use upon the potential market for or value of the copyrighted work ===
This requires considering the effect if the actions were widespread, not solely the effect of the particular user. A transformative work is less likely to have an adverse effect than one which merely supersedes the original: "Arriba’s use of Kelly’s images in its thumbnails does not harm the market for Kelly’s images or the value of his images". The thumbnails would guide people to Kelly's work rather than away from it and the size of the thumbnails makes using them instead of the original unattractive.

=== Result of the analysis ===
"Having considered the four fair use factors and found that two weigh in favor of Arriba, one is neutral, and one weighs slightly in favor of Kelly, we conclude that Arriba’s use of Kelly’s images as thumbnails in its search engine is a fair use."

== See also ==
- List of leading legal cases in copyright law
