= Authors Guild, Inc. v. HathiTrust =

American legal case

- Court: United States District Court for the Southern District of New York, United States Court of Appeals for the Second Circuit
- Full case name: Authors Guild v. HathiTrust
- Decided: June 10, 2014 (2d Cir.); October 10, 2012 (SDNY)
- Citations: 755 F.3d 87 (2d Cir. 2014); 902 F.Supp.2d 445, 104 U.S.P.Q.2d 1659, Copyr.L.Rep. ¶ 30327 (SDNY)

Court membership
- Judges sitting: Harold Baer Jr. (SDNY); John M. Walker, Jr., José A. Cabranes, Barrington Daniels Parker, Jr. (2d Cir.)

Keywords
- Copyright infringement; Fair use

Authors Guild v. HathiTrust, 755 F.3d 87 (2d Cir. 2014), is a United States copyright decision finding search and accessibility uses of digitized books to be fair use.

The Authors Guild, other author organizations, and individual authors claimed that the HathiTrust Digital Library had infringed their copyrights through its use of books scanned by Google. A federal court ruled against the plaintiffs in October 2012, finding that HathiTrust's use was permissible under fair use. The plaintiffs appealed the decision to the Second Circuit, and were rebuffed in 2014. In an opinion by Barrington Daniels Parker, Jr., the Second Circuit largely affirmed the lower court's findings of fair use for accessibility and search, remanding only to consider whether the plaintiffs had standing to sue about library preservation copies. The remaining claims were settled on January 6, 2015.

== Background ==
The HathiTrust Digital Library (HTDL) is a spin-off of the Google Books Library Project. It was founded in 2008 by the Committee on Institutional Cooperation and the University of California system. The collections of these university libraries were digitized by Google and then combined by HTDL. The digitization by Google has been the subject of a separate lawsuit.

HTDL's main objective is the long-term preservation of the collection. Member libraries may order replacement copies of works if "(1) the member already owned an original copy, (2) the member's original copy is lost, destroyed, or stolen, and (3) a replacement copy is unobtainable at a fair price." The HTDL main functionality is full-text search. When search results are found in works in the public domain, the work is displayed online, and so are works for which the copyright holder has granted permission. For other works, only page numbers and the number of search results per page are shown. In addition, the HTDL makes its collection available to students with print disabilities by offering them secure system access for screen readers. The collection of works available to print-disabled students through HTDL is often larger and easier to navigate than those offered through most university student disability student services offices.

Additionally, the University of Michigan library administers a project to identify orphan works. An orphan work is a copyrighted work whose owner cannot be identified or contacted. The Orphan Works Project focuses primarily on works in the HTDL. The project originally planned to automatically publish suspected orphan works after a 90-day notice. This plan was never implemented and was suspended indefinitely after the complaint in this case was filed.

== District court opinion ==
In its decisions, the district court first discusses the standing of the plaintiffs. Three plaintiffs, the Authors Guild, the Writers' Union of Canada and the Australian Society of Authors don't own any copyrights, but seek to assert the copyrights of their members. The court rules that under U.S. law only copyright owners and exclusive licensees may sue for copyright infringement. However, four foreign organizations are allowed to sue on behalf of their members because they have that right under foreign law. The thirteen remaining plaintiffs are copyright owners and all have standing.

The court then addresses the Orphan Works Project. The plaintiffs asked the court for a declaration that "distribution and display of copyrighted works through the HathiTrust Orphan Works Project will infringe the copyrights of Plaintiffs and others likely to be affected" as well as an injunction to stop the project. However, since the project never made it out of the planning phase, the court refuses to grant such an injunction. The court is missing "crucial information about what that program will look like should it come to pass and whom it will impact." The court says the plaintiffs can always request relief after the actual project has been launched.

=== Fair use ===
Finally, the court considers the main fair-use argument of the case. The plaintiffs argue that because the defendants are libraries, they are governed by 17 U.S.C. § 108 and can't claim a fair use defense. The court rules that the special rights granted to libraries in §108 are in addition to fair use rights and continues to evaluate the defendants' fair use claims. As the court explains, there are four independent factors to address in any fair use evaluation:

1. The purpose and character of the use, including whether such use is of a commercial nature or is for nonprofit educational purposes;
2. the nature of the copyrighted work;
3. the amount and substantiality of the portion used in relation to the copyrighted work as a whole; and
4. the effect of the use upon the potential market for or value of the copyrighted work.

Regarding the purpose and character of the use, the court deems all uses of the work by HTDL transformative. Use as a search engine has been deemed transformative before in Kelly v. Arriba Soft and Perfect 10 v. Amazon. Regarding accessibility, the court notes "the provision of access for [print-disabled users] was not the intended use of the original work (enjoyment and use by sighted persons) and this use is also transformative." Finally the court also says that non-commercial preservation is transformative.

With respect to the nature of the copyrighted works, the court declares that because the use is transformative, the nature of the works need not be considered. As for the amount of the works used, the court writes that "entire copies were necessary to fulfill Defendants' purposes of facilitation of searches and access for print-disabled individuals."

The court concludes with a discussion of how the defendants' use affects the market for the copyrighted works. The plaintiffs claim that the digitization of the books by the libraries represents lost sale of electronic books; the court explains however that e-books are not sufficient for the defendants' search engine and accessibility uses. The plaintiffs also claim that the defendants have opened the door to mass piracy by digitizing their works, but the court believes the defendants have taken adequate security measures to prevent that. Finally, the plaintiffs claim that the HTDL harms their future plans to open or license their own library or search engine. However, the court declines to rule on potential harm and also points out that transformative use "does not cause the copyright holder to suffer market harm due to the loss of license fees." The defendants also argue, and the court agrees, that plaintiffs will never "develop a market to license the use of works for search purposes, access for print-disabled individuals, or preservation purposes" because it is not a "commercially viable endeavor".

Weighing all these factors, the court concludes that all uses of the copyrighted works by the HTDL are fair use. The court also notes that while all of the HTDL is covered under fair use, the Americans with Disabilities Act of 1990 and the Chafee amendment also grant the libraries the right to provide access to copyrighted materials to print-disabled users.

== Circuit court opinion ==
The circuit court largely concurs with the district court's findings, except for two details. The circuit court disagrees with the district court that providing access to the print-disabled is a transformative use. The circuit court argues that merely making a work available to a broader audience than originally intended is not transformative. The court compares providing access to the print-disabled to translating a work into a different language, where the latter is not generally considered transformative. However, the court falls back on a Supreme Court decision in Sony v. Universal to assert that providing access to the print-disabled is in and of itself fair use.

The circuit court does not want to decide on the issue of the production of replacement copies for preservation purposes. The plaintiffs have not shown that any of their works would not be replaceable at a fair price, because works that are replaceable as such will not be reproduced by the HTDL. Therefore, the court vacates the lower court's decision on this issue and remands it back to them. The rest of the original judgment is affirmed by the court.

== See also ==
- Hachette v. Internet Archive
- Authors Guild v. Google
- Books in the United States
