= Authors Guild, Inc. v. Google, Inc. =

U.S. copyright law case, 2015

- Court: United States District Court for the Southern District of New York, United States Court of Appeals for the Second Circuit
- Full case name: The Authors Guild Inc., et al. v. Google, Inc.
- Decided: October 16, 2015 (2d Circuit); November 14, 2013 (SDNY)
- Citation: 804 F.3d 202

Court membership
- Judges sitting: Denny Chin (SDNY); Pierre N. Leval, José A. Cabranes, Barrington Daniels Parker, Jr. (2d Cir.)

Keywords
- Copyright infringement; Fair use

Authors Guild v. Google, 804 F.3d 202 (2nd Cir. 2015) was a copyright case heard in federal court for the Southern District of New York, and then the Second Circuit Court of Appeals between 2005 and 2015. It concerned fair use in copyright law and the transformation of printed copyrighted books into an online searchable database through scanning and digitization. It centered on the legality of the Google Book Search (originally named Google Print) Library Partner project that had been launched in 2003.

Though there was general agreement that Google's attempt to digitize books through scanning and computer-aided recognition for searching online was a transformative step for libraries, many authors and publishers had expressed concern that Google had not sought their permission to make scans of the books still under copyright and offer them to users. Two separate lawsuits, including one from three authors represented by the Authors Guild and another by Association of American Publishers, were filed in 2005 charging Google with copyright infringement. Google worked with the litigants in both suits to develop a settlement agreement (the Google Book Search Settlement Agreement) that would have allowed it to continue the program through paying out for works it had previously scanned, creating a revenue program for future books that were part of the search engine, and allowing authors and publishers to opt out. The settlement received much criticism as it also applied to all books worldwide, including works that may have been out of print but still under copyright, and may have violated antitrust aspects given Google's dominant position within the Internet industry. A reworked proposal to address some of these concerns was met with similar criticism, and ultimately the settlement was rejected by 2011, allowing the two lawsuits to be joined for a combined trial.

In late 2013, after the class action status was challenged, the District Court granted summary judgment in favor of Google, dismissing the lawsuit and affirming the Google Books project met all legal requirements for fair use. The Second Circuit Court of Appeal upheld the District Court's summary judgment in October 2015, ruling Google's "project provides a public service without violating intellectual property law." The U.S. Supreme Court subsequently denied a petition to hear the case.

== Background ==
Google launched its Google Book Search in 2002, initially named as its Google Print service. At its start, books were manually scanned page by page, using optical character recognition (OCR) to create a digital version of their text which then was incorporated into Google's search capabilities. As the project grew, Google expanded its capabilities to increase the rate at which books could be scanned and entered into its database, increasing the rate up to 6,000 pages per hour per scanning station, and build out a number of scanning facilities to enable rapid scanning of books brought to them from local sources. End users of the search engine could then search through the books to find words and phrases as they would with web sites, along with other advanced search features. Because of the possibility of OCR errors, users are shown the scanned pages rather than the digital text to verify the text for themselves. The project was considered a major transformative work for information sciences at the time.

Initially, Google only worked with books in the public domain. In December 2004, Google announced it had established its Library Partnership with the libraries at Stanford, Harvard, Oxford, the University of Michigan, and the New York Public Library to obtain works both in the public domain as well as limited works in copyright from Stanford, Harvard, and the University of Michigan. For works still under copyright, Google scanned and entered the whole work into their searchable database, but only provided "snippet views" of the scanned pages in search results to users. This had mirrored a similar approach Amazon had taken for book previews on its catalog pages. A separate Partner Program also launched in 2004 allowed commercial publishers to submit books into the Google Books project, which would be searchable with snippet results (or more extensive results if the partner desired) and which users could purchase as eBooks through Google, if the partner desired.

Authors and publishers began to argue that Google's Library Partner project, despite the limitations on what results they provided to users, violated copyrights as they were not asked ahead of time by Google to place scans of their books online. By August 2005, Google stated they would stop scanning in books until November 2005 as to give authors and publisher the opportunity to opt their books out of the program.

The publishing industry and writers' groups criticized the project's inclusion of snippets of copyrighted works as infringement. Despite Google taking measures to provide full text of only works in public domain, and providing only a searchable summary online for books still under copyright protection, publishers maintain that Google has no right to copy full text of books with copyrights and save them, in large amounts, into its own database.

== Inception of the lawsuit ==
In September 2005, three authors as well as the Authors Guild of America filed a class action lawsuit against Google and Stanford, Harvard, and the University of Michigan libraries over the Google Print project, citing "massive copyright infringement". The complaint asserted that Google had not sought approval to make scans of the copyrighted books, and asked for an injunction to stop Google from scanning any copyrighted works during the lawsuit. Google countered that its project represented a fair use and is the digital age equivalent of a card catalog with every word in the publication indexed. A month later, the Association of American Publishers, representing five publishers – McGraw-Hill, Pearson Education, Penguin Group, Simon & Schuster and John Wiley & Sons – filed a similar suit against Google and the libraries on a similar complaint. Both cases were heard in the United States District Court for the Southern District of New York initially under Judge John E. Sprizzo.

== Settlement attempts ==
=== Initial settlement ===
Google worked with all parties in both cases at the same time, and in October 2008, had reached an initial settlement agreement in both cases, pending court approval. Also known as the "Google Book Search Settlement Agreement," the terms of this settlement included:

- A total of US$125 million payment from Google to the affected companies and authors: US$45 million to the rights holders whose copyrights had allegedly been infringed; US$15.5 million for the publishers' legal fees; US$30 million to the authors' lawyers; and US$34.5 million to create a Book Rights Registry, a form of copyright collective that would collect revenues from Google and dispense them to the rights holders.
- The settlement gave all authors and publishers a year and half, until June 2010, to submit opt-out requests to Google to either prevent Google from scanning their books in the future or to remove any books already scanned.
- For all other books, it allowed Google to continue to scan and incorporate the contents into its search results, though paid US$60 to authors and publishers for all copyrighted works for scans it had made before May 2009.
- Google was able to engage in one of several revenue models to offer this content to users. All revenue was shared 37% with Google and 63% split between the authors and publishers under this. Authors or publishers had options to limit how their work was used under this model as well.
  - For free user, Google was able to show up to 20% of a copyrighted book via the snippet mode. Google could show ads on these pages and split the ad revenue with authors and publishers.
  - A user could purchase access to a book, treated as an eBook, for a one-time cost.
  - Institutions could acquire full access to all books for a subscription-based fee.

At this point, as the case was a class-action suit, it required notice and agreement from a majority of the class for the settlement to be approved, roughly a four-month window. Before this was initiated, Judge Sprizzo died in December 2008, and the case was reassigned to Judge Denny Chin, prolonging action on the settlement. The class action notification and period for objection or comment ran from January to May 2009. This period gave time for the settlement terms to be contested by others. Harvard's libraries were not pleased with the settlement terms, and discontinued its partnership with Google unless more "reasonable terms" could be met on the settlement.

=== Settlement criticisms ===
In the US, several organizations who took no part of the settlement, such as the American Society of Journalists and Authors, criticized the settlement fundamentally. Moreover, the New York book settlement was not restricted to U.S. authors, but relevant to authors of the whole world. This led to objections even on the level of some European governments and critical voices in many European newspapers. The estate of John Steinbeck argued for and was granted an additional four-month extension for the class to file objections, putting the deadline into October 2009 and with Judge Chin expected to evaluate the settlement in November.

Primary criticism of the settlement was related to copyright. Siva Vaidhyanathan, associate professor of Media Studies and Law at the University of Virginia, has argued that the project poses a danger for the doctrine of fair use as the fair use claims are arguably so excessive that it may cause a judicial limitation of that right. American author Ursula K. Le Guin announced on her website her resignation from the Authors' Guild over the settlement, claiming the leadership of the Guild had "sold us [its members] down the river" and that the settlement threatened "the whole concept of copyright." She launched a petition against the settlement, which was signed by almost 300 authors.

Censorship was also raised as a major issue, as respondents argued Google was creating a content management system that could remove material as easily as they could add it, and would have the power to remove books the same way that it is able to remove videos from YouTube, with no controlling mechanisms outside Google itself. Organizations such as the International Federation of Library Associations and Institutions and the Electronic Frontier Foundation (EFF) fear that pressure from governments and special interest groups could lead to the censorship of certain books and that there is public interest in protecting the scans from being buried behind Google's ranking system.

Privacy advocates from EFF and American Civil Liberties Union also raised concerns that Google would track users of its book services. Privacy advocates want Google to provide privacy assurances comparable to those enjoyed by visitors to traditional libraries. Others have denounced the settlement for neglecting to protect reader privacy.

Antitrust issues were also raised as Google was a dominant entity in Internet services in the market. Since the settlement agreement covers the previously digitized books and provides a revenue model for future digitization, it "[gives] Google control over the digitizing of virtually all books covered by copyright in the United States." As the license agreement is non-exclusive, it does not necessarily tie publishers to Google's service. In a journal article, MIT Professor Jerry A. Hausman and Criterion Economics Chairman J. Gregory Sidak conclude that the service will be unable to exercise market power. Hausman and Sidak believe that Google Book Search should, on net, yield a significant gain in consumer surplus. Among the objections to the settlement was a "Statement of Interest" from the United States Department of Justice (DOJ) submitting in September 2009. The DOJ's statement, while acknowledging the settlement was in the right direction, identified possible antitrust concerns with the current settlement terms, stating "The current settlement proposal would stifle innovation and competition in favor of a monopoly over the access, distribution and pricing of the largest collection of digital books in the world, and would reinforce an already dominant position in search and search advertising."

In October 2009, Google countered ongoing criticism by stating that its scanning of books and putting them online would protect the world's cultural heritage; Google co-founder Sergey Brin stated, "The famous Library of Alexandria burned three times, in 48 BC, AD 273 and AD 640, as did the Library of Congress, where a fire in 1851 destroyed two-thirds of the collection. I hope such destruction never happens again, but history would suggest otherwise." This characterization was criticized by Pam Samuelson, UC Berkeley Professor of Law, saying

Libraries everywhere are terrified that Google will engage in price-gouging when setting prices for institutional subscriptions to GBS contents ... Brin forgot to mention another significant difference between GBS and traditional libraries: their policies on patron privacy. ... Google has been unwilling to make meaningful commitments to protect user privacy. Traditional libraries, by contrast, have been important guardians of patron privacy.

=== Amended agreement ===
Due to the number of complaints, Google and the litigants withdrew the initial settlement in October 2009 and began reworking its term to address the concerns from these complaints to create what was known as "Settlement 2.0". The parties submitted the amended settlement agreement in November 2009. The amended agreement included several significant changes: limited the scope to foreign books that are registered with the U.S. Copyright Office or published in the UK, Canada, or Australia, added board members to the Books Rights Registry from the UK, Canada, and Australia, gave the rights holder the ability to renegotiate the revenue share, gave Google added flexibility in discounting, and created a fiduciary to hold payments due to orphan works. If the rights holder is never ascertained, the funds are distributed cy-près instead of redistributed among rights holders, and increased the number of public licenses allowed for a library.

The period for class action review and objections was put on an accelerated schedule, with objections to be submitted by January 28, 2010, and fairness hearings on February 18. While the amended agreement elicited fewer objections than did the initial settlement, objectors remained critical of the settlement terms. The DOJ also remained critical of the settlement during the fairness hearing, asserting that the antitrust issues remained with the settlement since it allowed Google to bypass the typical financial penalties for copyright penalty that was not afforded to any other company. The Open Book Alliance, which had reviewed the first settlement and prepared a framework it offered to the parties for Settlement 2.0, asserted that the new settlement terms still allowed Google to maintain its monopoly on digital access and distribution of books among other concerns.

=== Amended agreement rejected ===
On March 22, 2011, Judge Chin issued a ruling on the amended settlement agreement, rejecting it due to concerns on copyright, antitrust, privacy, and international law. Chin's primary reason for blocking the settlement was based on the fact that the amended settlement agreement would "release Google (and others) from liability for certain future acts." From the ruling:

[I]t is incongruous with the purpose of the copyright laws to place the onus on copyright owners to come forward to protect their rights when Google copied their works without first seeking their permission. [...] While the digitization of books and the creation of a universal digital library would benefit many, the ASA would simply go too far. It would permit this class action - - which was brought against defendant Google Inc. ("Google") to challenge its scanning of books and display of "snippets" for on-line searching - - to implement a forward-looking business arrangement that would grant Google significant rights to exploit entire books, without permission of the copyright owners. Indeed, the ASA would give Google a significant advantage over competitors, rewarding it for engaging in wholesale copying of copyrighted works without permission, while releasing claims well beyond those presented in the case. Accordingly, and for the reasons more fully discussed below, the motion for final approval of the ASA is denied.

The Wall Street Journal commented on the practical impact of this ruling saying that:

Judge Chin's ruling changes little for Google users. About two million books that are in the public domain, such as works of William Shakespeare, currently can be viewed free on the Google Books site. [...] Google Books users currently can view long previews of another two million books that are in copyright and in print, thanks to agreements between Google and tens of thousands of publishers that were separate from the legal settlement. Millions more books that are in copyright but out of print are currently available in Google Books in a shorter 'snippet view.' Had the settlement been approved, users would have been able to see longer previews and potentially buy those books.

Chin urged that the settlement be revised to one whether authors "opt-in" to having their works digitized rather than "opt-out", and arranged for followup status conferences to discuss next steps with all parties. During a July 2011 status conference the parties attempted to "reassure Judge Chin that the negotiations were making real progress," and Judge Chin scheduled another status conference for September 15, urging the parties to come to an acceptable opt-in agreement or face a "tight discovery schedule". By September 2011, Chin established a schedule for a discovery phase for the pending trial to be heard by jury in July 2012 while the parties attempted to continue to find some type of settlement terms.

== District trial ==
Just prior to the planned jury trial, with the parties unable to come to any settlement terms, Judge Chin granted the case its class-action status in May 2012, which asserted that the Authors Guild had standing for the class members. Google appealed the class-action certification to the Second Circuit, which issued a stay of proceedings in the District Court trial pending review of the class action appeal in September 2012. After hearing the case in May 2013, the Second Circuit vacating the class-action certification and remanded the case to the District Court in July 2013, stating that the class certification was premature before Judge Chin had considered any of the fair use issues of the case.

Oral arguments on the fair use matters were held in September 2013. On November 14, 2013, Judge Chin issued his ruling on the parties' cross-motions for summary judgment, and in effect dismissed the infringement lawsuit, holding that Google's use of the works was 'fair use' under copyright law. In his ruling, Judge Chin wrote:

In my view, Google Books provides significant public benefits. It advances the progress of the arts and sciences, while maintaining respectful consideration for the rights of authors and other creative individuals, and without adversely impacting the rights of copyright holders. It has become an invaluable research tool that permits students, teachers, librarians, and others to more efficiently identify and locate books. It has given scholars the ability, for the first time, to conduct full-text searches of tens of millions of books. It preserves books, in particular out-of-print and old books that have been forgotten in the bowels of libraries, and it gives them new life. It facilitates access to books for print-disabled and remote or underserved populations. It generates new audiences and creates new sources of income for authors and publishers. Indeed, all society benefits.

Chin's ruling analyzed the four traditional factors (now codified in statutory law) that decide whether use of a copyrighted work constitutes fair use under United States copyright law, and concluded that the Google Books program meets all legal requirements for "fair use". On the most important factor, possible economic damage to the copyright owner, Chin wrote, "Google Books enhances the sales of books to the benefit of copyright holders."

According to law professor Eric Goldman, reactions to the ruling generally favored Judge Chin's ruling. For example, the Association of Research Libraries calling on the Authors Guild to "wise up and focus their energies on more productive pursuits."

== Second Circuit appeal ==
On April 11, 2014, the Authors Guild appealed the ruling to the U.S. Second Circuit. It also began lobbying Congress to create a non-profit organization similar to ASCAP that would digitize and license books from participating authors to all libraries, schools, and other organizations choosing to pay a subscription fee. Oral arguments were held on December 3, 2014, before Judges Pierre N. Leval, José A. Cabranes, Barrington Daniels Parker, Jr. On October 16, 2015, the Second Circuit unanimously affirmed the judgment in Google's favor.

The court summarized its opinion thus:

1. "Google's unauthorized digitizing of copyright-protected works, creation of a search functionality, and display of snippets from those works are non-infringing fair uses. The purpose of the copying is highly transformative, the public display of text is limited, and the revelations do not provide a significant market substitute for the protected aspects of the originals. Google's commercial nature and profit motivation do not justify denial of fair use."
2. "Google's provision of digitized copies to the libraries that supplied the books, on the understanding that the libraries will use the copies in a manner consistent with the copyright law, also does not constitute infringement. Nor, on this record, is Google a contributory infringer."

== Certiorari petition ==
On December 31, 2015, The Authors Guild (on behalf of three named authors and "others similarly situated") filed a petition for writ of certiorari with the U.S. Supreme Court requesting that the Court review the Second Circuit's October 16, 2015, decision.

The petition presents three substantive questions and a fourth procedural one. The substantive questions are:

1. Whether, in order to be "transformative" under the fair-use exception to copyright, the use of the copyrighted work must produce "new expression, meaning, or message," as this Court stated in Campbell and as the Third, Sixth, and Eleventh Circuits have held, or whether the verbatim copying of works for a different, non-expressive purpose can be a transformative fair use, as the Second, Fourth, and Ninth Circuits have held.
2. Whether the Second Circuit's approach to fair use improperly makes "transformative purpose" the decisive factor, replacing the statutory four-factor test, as the Seventh Circuit has charged.
3. Whether the Second Circuit erred in concluding that a commercial business may evade liability for verbatim copying by arguing that the recipients of those copies will use them for lawful and beneficial purposes, a rationale that has been flatly rejected by the Sixth Circuit.

On April 18, 2016, the Supreme Court denied the petition for writ of certiorari, leaving the Second Circuit ruling in Google's favor intact.

== Impact ==
Authors Guild, Inc. v. HathiTrust (2014) was a following case related to HathiTrust, a project by the libraries of the Big Ten Academic Alliance and the University of California systems that combined their digital library collections with those of Google's Book Search. The HathiTrust case differed in two primary factors which were raised by the plaintiffs: that for viewers with disabilities, they could view the scanned text through a screen reader to make it easier to read, and offering to print out the scans as replacement copies for members of the universities if they could verify their original copies were lost or damaged. Both uses were deemed also to be fair use by the Second Circuit.

The subject of the copyright of orphan works – works that may still be under copyright but with no identifiable rights holder – was a significant point of debate after both this and HathiTrust. Normally, libraries have been hesitant to loan digital copies of orphaned works as libraries may be liable for copyright violations should the copyright owner step forward to claim ownership. The United States Copyright Office, spurred by the question of digitization for book preservation, wrote a guidance paper in 2015 on the matter of orphaned works stating that those making digital copies of orphan works should not be liable for any copyright violations if they have made a good faith effort to locate the original authors, in a manner similar to the unpassed Shawn Bentley Orphan Works Act of 2008. The paper recommended that such legislation be passed.

The ruling, finding Google's approach to be fair use, alongside Authors Guild, Inc. v. HathiTrust has been used as the basis of controlled digital lending (CDL). As argued under the CDL model, a library that owns a physical copy of a book has rights under both fair use (as established under this case) and the first-sale doctrine to "lend" an electronic scanned copy of that book with appropriate digital rights management to a user as if they were lending out the physical book, thus allowing libraries to serve remote users. The Internet Archive's Open Library project used the CDL concept to justify its system, but this has come under criticism from authors and publishers of copyrighted books within the Open Library. The CDL concept has not been tested in courts, and a lawsuit against the Open Library for copyright infringement was initiated by four publishers in June 2020. This case, Hachette v. Internet Archive, was heard in the Southern District of New York. On March 25, 2023, the court ruled against the Internet Archive.

== See also ==
- Books in the United States
