= Ryan AbilityLab =

Coordinates: 41°53′37.8″N 87°37′6.2″W

Shirley Ryan AbilityLab
- Shirley Ryan AbilityLab

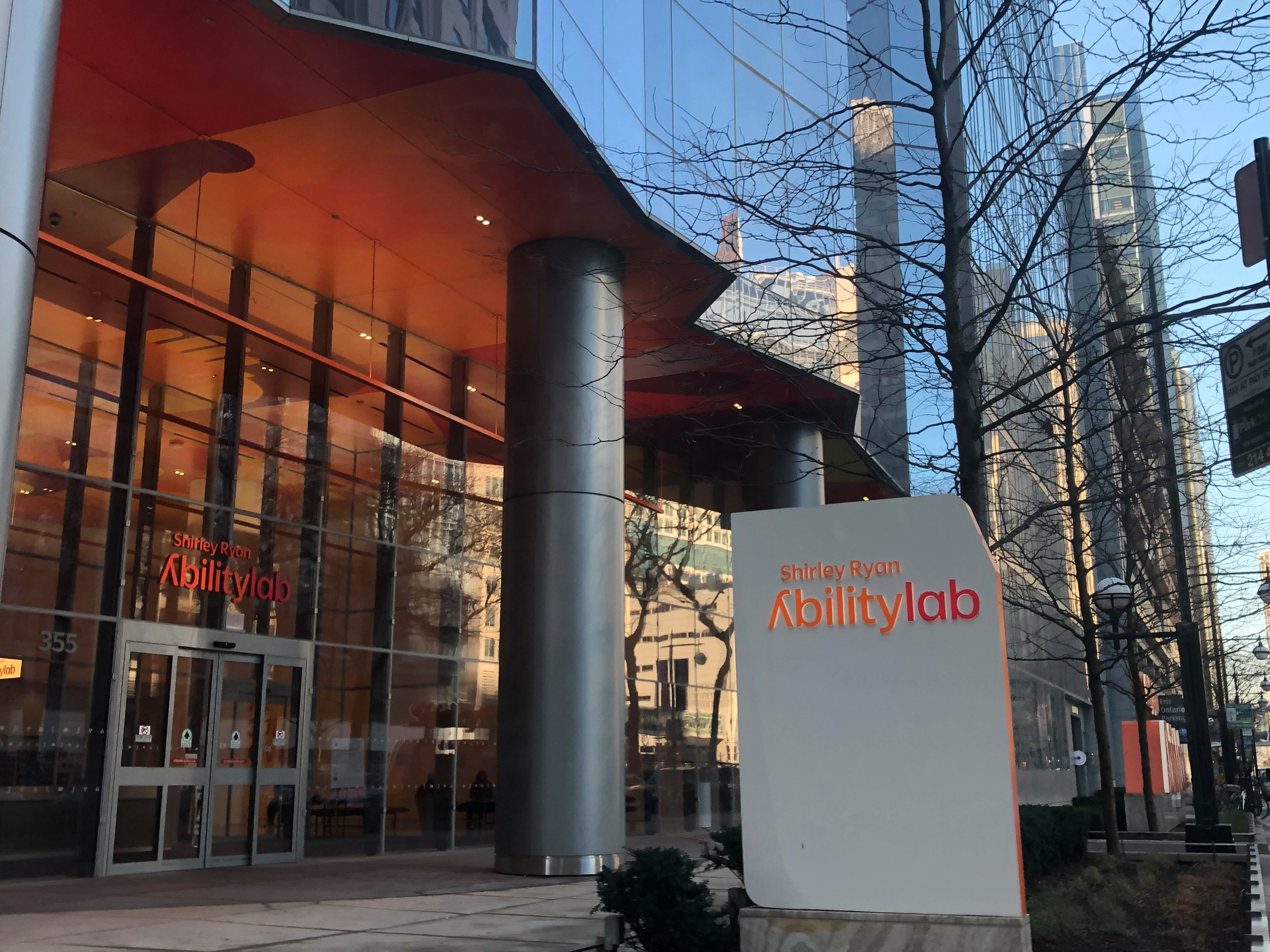
- The Erie Street entrance to the Shirley Ryan AbilityLab

Geography
- Location: Northwestern University Chicago campus, Chicago, Illinois, United States

Organization
- Type: Rehabilitation Research Hospital
- Affiliated university: Northwestern University; Feinberg School of Medicine; Northwestern Memorial Hospital
- Network: Northwestern Medicine

History
- Founded: 1954

Links
- Website: Shirley Ryan AbilityLab
- Lists: Hospitals in Illinois

The Shirley Ryan AbilityLab, formerly the Rehabilitation Institute of Chicago (RIC), is a not-for-profit physical medicine and rehabilitation research hospital based in Chicago, Illinois. Founded in 1954, the AbilityLab is designed for patient care, education, and research in physical medicine and rehabilitation (PM&R). The AbilityLab specializes in rehabilitation for adults and children with the most severe, complex conditions ranging from traumatic brain and spinal cord injury to stroke, amputation and cancer-related impairment. Affiliated with Northwestern University, the hospital is located on Northwestern’s Chicago campus and partners on research and medical efforts.

Since 1991, the hospital has remained the top ranked rehabilitation hospital in America as ranked by U.S. News & World Report. Applied research focuses in the areas of neuroscience, bionic medicine, musculoskeletal medicine and technology transfer.

Upon opening in March 2017, its 1.2-million-square-foot facility became the first “translational” research hospital in which clinicians, scientists, innovators and technologists work together in the same space.

== History ==
Rehabilitation is a relatively new medical specialty, becoming certified as such in 1947. Immediately following World War II, which had a significant impact on the specialty of rehabilitation, General Omar Bradley, the head the Veterans Administration, recruited Dr. Paul Magnuson, a U.S. Army orthopaedic surgeon, who created the infrastructure for the VA to provide rehabilitation for veterans. Magnuson served until 1951 and, shortly thereafter, declared his vision to establish a medical rehabilitation hospital for American citizens. With modest philanthropic means, he then purchased a vacant printing building at 401 E. Ohio Street in Chicago, Ill., and a new organization was formally incorporated as the not-for-profit Rehabilitation Institute of Chicago (RIC). By the spring of 1953, the building was converted into a small rehabilitation hospital and began serving a limited number of outpatients.

In 1958, the building was renovated, enabling the hospital to serve inpatients. In 1967, RIC formed an academic affiliation with Northwestern University, establishing a residency program in physical medicine and rehabilitation (PM&R), and soon thereafter appointed its first Chief Scientist. In 1974, it moved into a new location at 345 E. Superior Street in Chicago, Ill., and became the first free-standing rehabilitation hospital in the nation.

In December 2009, RIC announced that it had purchased the site of the former Chicago CBS building site (355 E. Erie Street) on which to build a new hospital, expanding its capabilities and capacity. Groundbreaking took place on July 1, 2013.

In 2016, principal philanthropists Pat and Shirley Ryan named the new research hospital, which would be called Shirley Ryan AbilityLab. Pathways.org, the organization founded by the Ryans 30 years prior, became part of Shirley Ryan AbilityLab in 2017. On March 25, 2017, RIC officially became known as the Shirley Ryan AbilityLab.

== Patient populations ==
Shirley Ryan AbilityLab serves adults and children with the severe, complex conditions – from traumatic brain injury and spinal cord injury to stroke, amputation-related and cancer-related functional impairment (i.e., physical/cognitive impairment or loss of function). They have introduced a model of care through five Innovation Centers focused on areas of biomedical science:

- Brain Innovation Center
- Spinal Cord Innovation Center
- Nerve, Muscle & Bone Innovation Center
- Pediatric Innovation Center
- Cancer Rehabilitation Innovation Center

Central to applying research during care are working labs in which interdisciplinary teams develop new research and insights to help patients gain more function and achieve better outcomes. These include:

- Think + Speak Lab: Treatment for fundamental brain functions – arousal, lucidity, awareness, thinking, communication, perception, memory and learning.
- Legs + Walking Lab: Improvement of locomotion, gait and walking via trunk and pelvis stability; positioning and control of the hips, knees and ankles; as well as stepping and propulsion.
- Arms + Hands Lab: Improvement of hand function and movement, body and upper-limb coordination, strength, reaching and hand/finger control.
- Strength + Endurance Lab: Improvement of stamina and resilience, complex motor and endurance activities, coordination, and higher-level activities of daily living (ADL) (e.g., cooking, housekeeping, exercise, sports).
- Pediatric Lab: A customized approach for the developing brains, bodies and conditions unique to children (infants to teens).

== Research scope and diversity ==
The organization's research budget is US$139 million. The research division has been granted $50 million in external funding.

=== Research labs and centers ===
The hospital is also home to a number of other research groups.

The Center for Bionic Medicine at the Shirley Ryan AbilityLab is the largest bionic research group in the world. Discoveries and innovations include:

- The first thought-controlled bionic arm and leg
- The first manual wheelchair to offer users mobility in either a seated or standing position
- Pattern recognition-based myoelectric control of partial-hand prostheses
- Lightweight powered lower-limb prostheses
- Targeted muscle reinnervation (TMR), a surgical technique that “rewires” amputated nerves and allows intuitive control and sensation of bionic arms and legs

==== Biologics laboratory ====
The Biologics Research Lab at Shirley Ryan AbilityLab, founded by Dr. Richard L. Lieber, Chief Scientific Officer and Senior Vice President of Research, focuses on developing biological approaches to treat various neuromuscular diseases, including spinal cord injuries, peripheral nerve injuries, muscle disorders, and conditions like cerebral palsy and cancer. As a "wet" lab, it is equipped to research living human tissue, allowing scientists to study movement impairments at the cellular level. This setup enables the exploration of mechanisms underlying injury and recovery and supports the development of novel therapeutic strategies, such as advanced biomaterials and nerve stimulators.

Led by a diverse team of Principal Investigators (PIs), the lab integrates expertise in tissue engineering, neurophysiology, biomechanics, and regenerative medicine, fostering a collaborative environment that bridges basic science and clinical applications. The collective goal is to leverage current scientific knowledge and innovative ideas to significantly advance patient outcomes and the field of rehabilitation.

==== Max Nader Lab for Rehabilitation Technologies and Outcomes Research ====
This lab develops and executes both industry-sponsored and investigator-initiated research in prosthetsesics, orthosestics, rehabilitation robotics, as well as other assistive and adaptive technologies. Scientists have worked with more than two dozen industrial wearable robotics collaborators, including Ottobock, Honda, Össur, Ekso Bionics, ReWalk Robotics, Parker Hannifin, Hocoma, B-Temia Inc and Samsung to create pathways and practice guidelines for the use of technologies for individuals with conditions including stroke, spinal cord injury, multiple sclerosis and cerebral palsy. It also conducts outcomes-based research using advanced wearable sensors in addition to traditional performance-based and patient-reported measures

== Academics and PM&R Residency Program ==
Shirley Ryan AbilityLab also serves as a clinical partner of Northwestern University's McCormick School of Engineering, and the academic home of Northwestern University Feinberg School of Medicine Physical Medicine & Rehabilitation (PM&R) Department.

The organization was among the first rehabilitation hospitals to offer a medical residency program in this specialty, and remains one of the largest. It is a four-year program. Shirley Ryan AbilityLab also has six fellowship programs: Pediatrics, Pain, Parkinson’s Disease and Movement Disorders, Sports Medicine, Traumatic Brain Injury and Spinal Cord Injury.
