= Charles Deering Memorial Library =

Library at Northwestern University

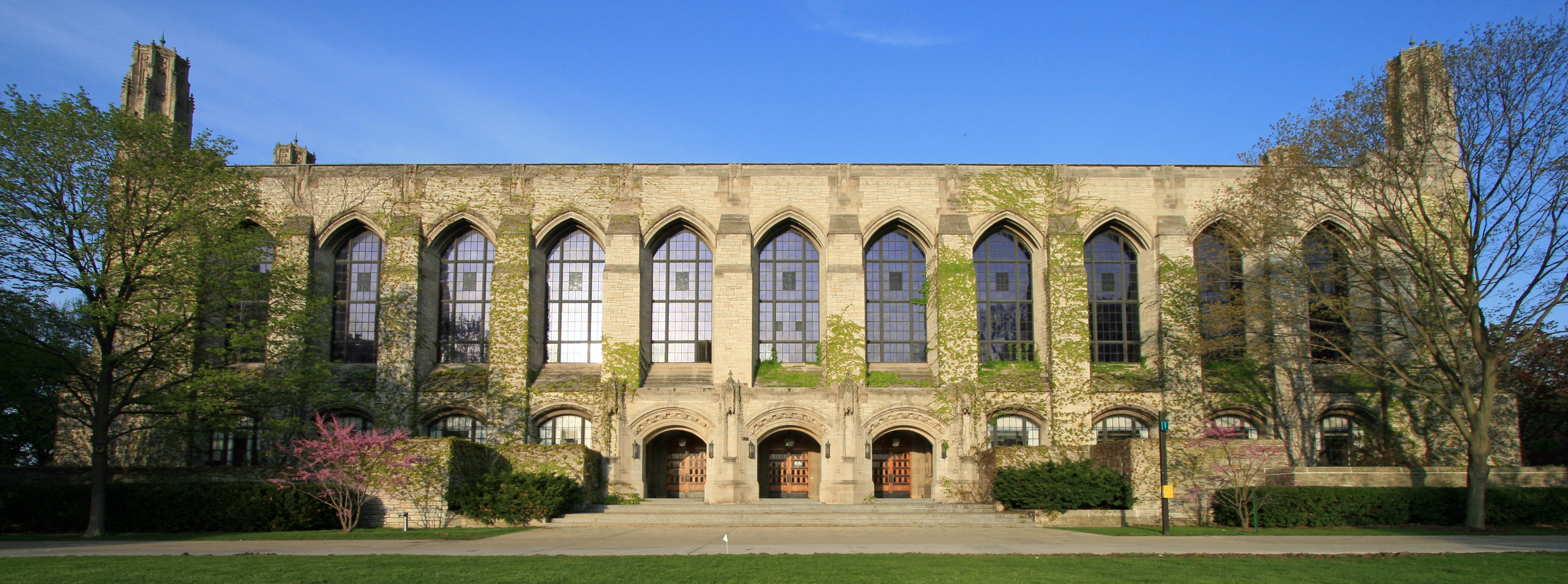
- Front of the Deering Library in 2008
- 42.0532°N 87.6753°W
- Location: Northwestern University, Evanston, Illinois
- Established: 1933
- Architect: James Gamble Rogers

Other information
- Website: www.library.northwestern.edu/libraries-collections/library-buildings-locations/deering-library/

Charles Deering Memorial Library is an academic library of Northwestern University, a private research university in Evanston, Illinois. Deering served as the university's main library on the Evanston campus from 1933, when it was established, until the construction of the Northwestern University Main Library in 1970.

Deering Library houses the Northwestern University Archives on the first floor, the Music Library on the second floor, and both the Art Collection and the Special Collections Department on the third floor. The library is named for Charles Deering, a Northwestern benefactor and chairman of International Harvester, who provided the initial financing for the building.

== Construction and the building ==
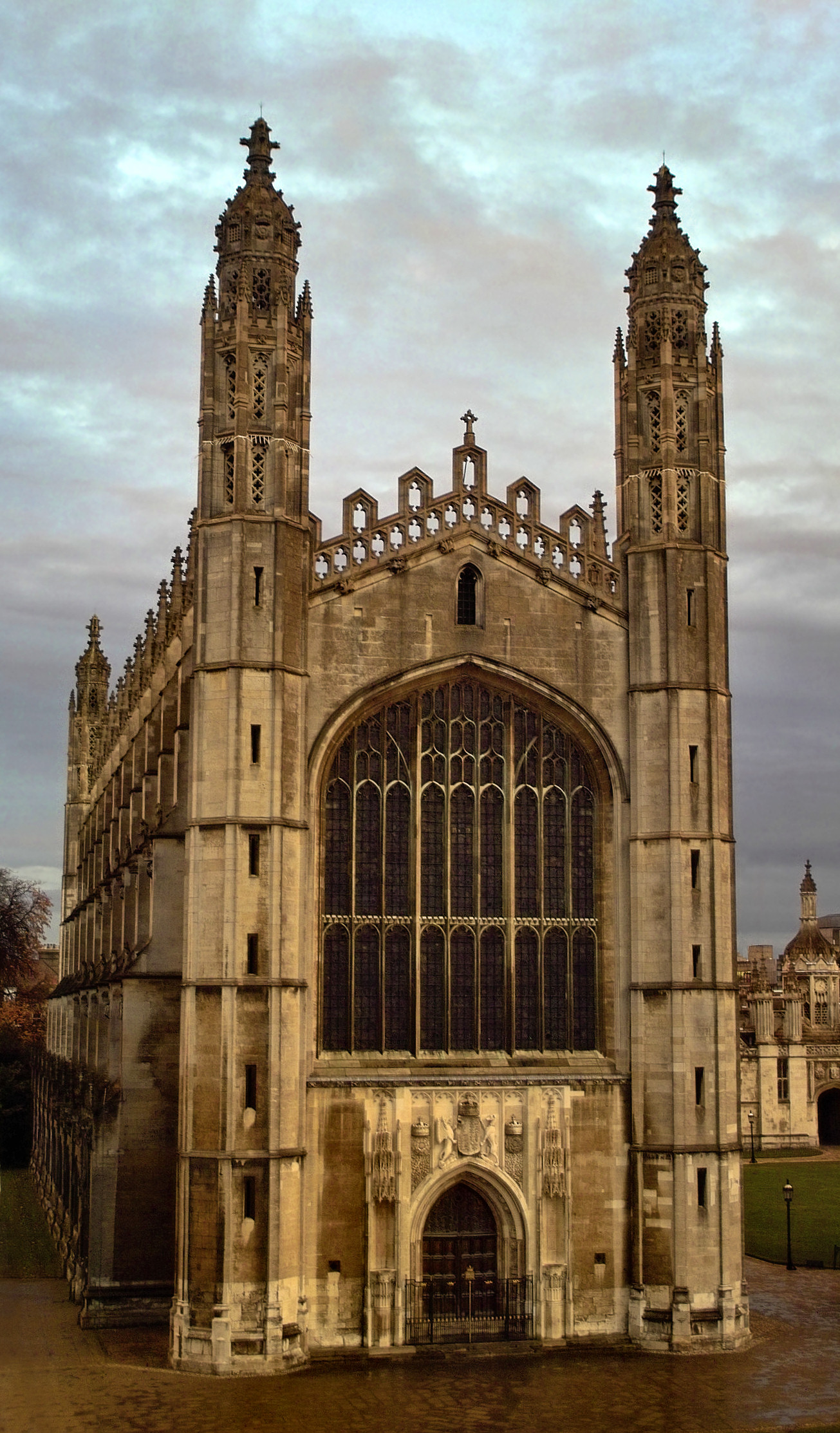
King's College Chapel at Cambridge University, the model for Deering Library.

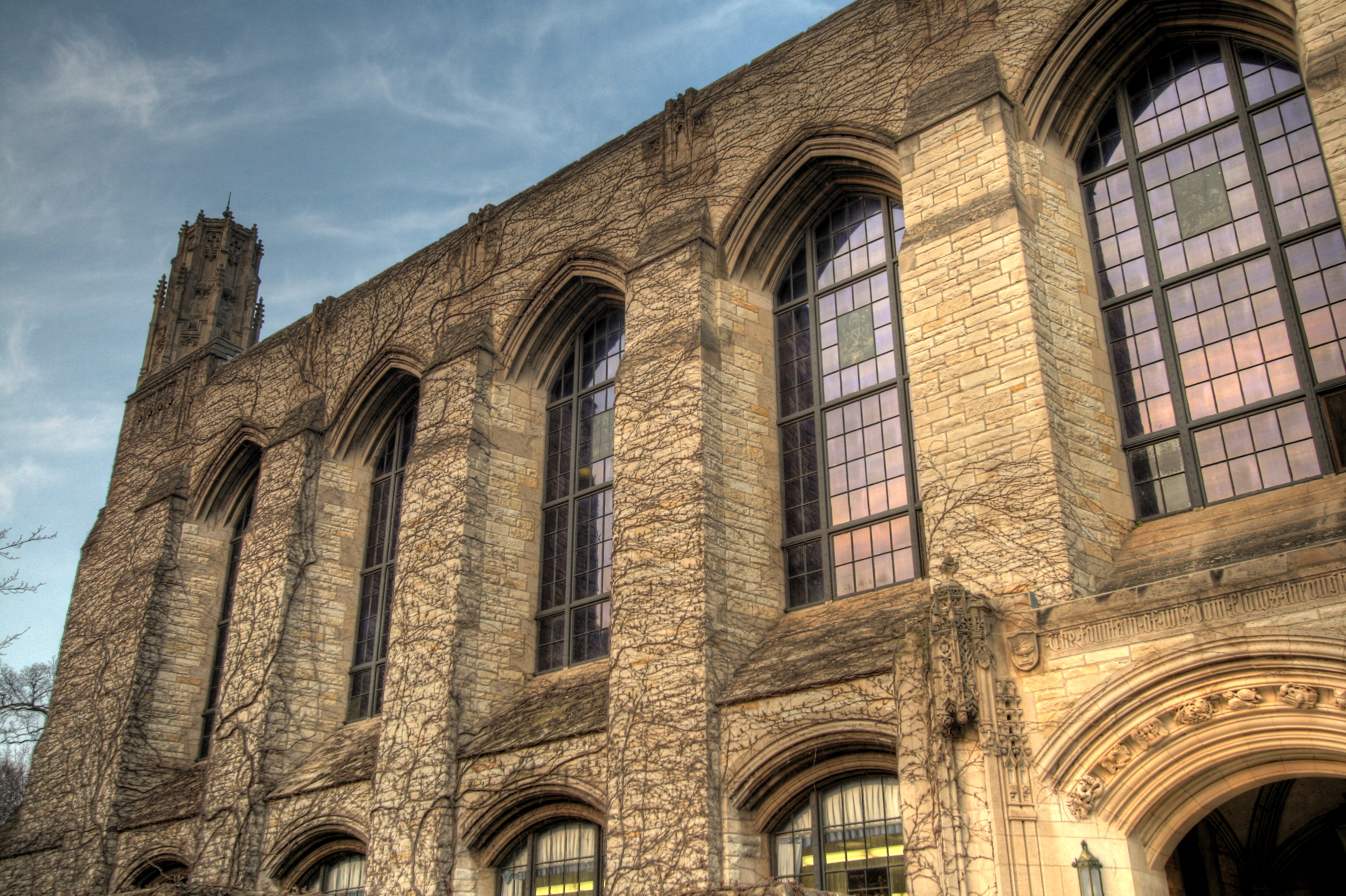
Detail

Deering Library succeeded Lunt Library (now Lunt Hall) as Northwestern's principal library. Built in 1894, Lunt Library was the university's first library, but it became severely overcrowded by the 1920s. Deering Library, which was planned by Theodore Wesley Koch, the University Librarian from 1919 to 1941, served as Northwestern's main library until the completion of University Library in 1970. After the opening of the University Library, the only way to enter Deering Library was through a basement corridor that connected the new Library to the old.

The site chosen for Deering Library had previously been occupied by Heck Hall, a dormitory which burned down in 1914. The library was designed by the architect James Gamble Rogers in Collegiate Gothic style. Building began in 1931, the cornerstone was laid in 1932, and the building opened in 1933. The structure is composed of Lannon stone and was modeled after King's College Chapel at Cambridge University. It contains 68 stained glass windows by G. Owen Bonawit; many of the glass windows picture shields of other universities. The wood and stone carvings were made by the sculptor Rene Paul Chambellan. The Bulletin of the American Library Association said of the wood carvings: "Captivating pelicans, pompous owls, and mischievous monkeys peer at one from decorous perches, refreshingly reminding one that the environment of scholarship need not necessarily be solemn."

The initial funding for the building was provided by the family of Charles Deering, who donated $1 million for the building. Before his death, Deering had endowed a professorship in botany, and his father, William Deering, had donated Fisk Hall, another building on the Evanston campus.

== Library renovation ==
In 2013, the library underwent a $2.5 million renovation that began with restoring the West Entry where the main doors were located, the lobby, and the outside place, as well as adding accessible-entry routes. The library renovation received an award for "Devine Detail" from the Chicago chapter of the American Institute of Architects in 2013 and a Palladio Award for "Restoration and Renovation" in 2016.
