= Campus of Northwestern University =

College campuses in Illinois, United States

The campus of Northwestern University encompasses two campuses in Evanston, Illinois and Chicago, Illinois, United States. There is an additional campus located in Doha, Qatar which offers bachelor's and master's degrees. The original Evanston campus has witnessed approximately 150 buildings rise on its 240 acres (0.97 km^{2}) since the first building opened in 1855. The downtown Chicago campus of approximately 25 acres (100,000 m^{2}) is home to the schools of medicine and law was purchased and constructed in the 1920s and 1930s.

== Evanston campus ==
=== History ===
In the 1960s, the university added 84 acres (340,000 m^{2}) to the campus by building a seawall and filling in the interior with sand. Only a portion of the landfill has been used for new buildings, and a portion on the east side of a lagoon is still undeveloped.

=== Notable buildings ===
==== Deering Library ====
The Charles Deering Library is a library located on the main Evanston campus of Northwestern University. The Deering Library presently houses the Government Publications Department and the Northwestern University Archives on the first floor, the Music Library on the second floor, and the Map Collection, the Art Reference Collection and the Special Collections Department on the third floor. The Deering Library served as Northwestern's main library until the completion of the University Library in 1970.

==== University Library ====
The Northwestern University Library is the principal library for the Evanston campus of Northwestern University. The library holds 4.6 million volumes, making it the 11th largest library at a private university. The building was designed in brutalist style by Walter Netsch of Skidmore, Owings and Merrill. Construction started in 1966 and the library opened in 1970. The library succeeded the Charles Deering Library as the main library on campus. The Deering Library was connected to the main library through construction, and continues to house the university's special collections.

==== Dearborn Observatory ====
The Dearborn Observatory is an observatory, located on the Evanston campus of Northwestern University. The observatory was originally constructed in 1888. In the summer of 1939, Dearborn Observatory was moved to make way for the construction of the Technological Institute.

==== University Hall ====
University Hall is the oldest original building on the Northwestern University campus. University Hall was actually the second building constructed on the Northwestern University campus. The building known as "Old College" was constructed as a temporary building in 1855, though it stood on campus until the 1970s. University Hall was designed in Victorian Gothic style by G. P. Randall, and is composed of Joliet limestone - the same kind used to build the Chicago Water Tower. The construction materials were transported to the Evanston campus by lake boat and rail.

The cornerstone of the building was laid in 1868, and the structure was completed in 1869, at a total cost of $125,000. University Hall officially opened on September 8, 1869, and coincided with the inauguration of University President Erastus Otis Haven. Speakers at the opening ceremony included Illinois Governor John M. Palmer, and the new University President Haven, who called the structure, "the new and elegant University Building". The clock in the tower of University Hall was the gift of the Class of 1879; its movement was built by clockmaker Seth Thomas. In 1966, a new electrified clock replaced the old works, which are now located in the Smithsonian National Museum of American History.

University Hall took over most university functions from Old College and contained classrooms housing all University classes, the library, a chemical lab, a chapel, two society rooms and a fourth-floor natural history museum. University Hall contained Northwestern's primary library until the construction of Lunt Library in the 1890s. Though it was succeeded by Fayerweather Hall as the university's main building in 1887, University Hall served a variety of functions. Over the years University Hall has been the home of the central administration, the engineering school, a cafeteria, and faculty offices. University Hall underwent a $5.2 million renovation and was rededicated in 1993. The building is currently home to Northwestern's English department.

==== Technological Institute ====
The Technological Institute, more commonly known as "Tech", is a landmark building at Northwestern University. Robert R. McCormick School of Engineering and Applied Science following a major gift from the Robert R. McCormick Foundation. It is the main building for students and faculty in the Robert R. McCormick School of Engineering and Applied Science. The construction of the building started in 1939 when Walter P. Murphy, a wealthy inventor of railroad equipment, donated $6.737 million. Murphy meant for the institute to offer a new kind of "cooperative" educational model for the field, where academic courses and practical application in industrial settings were closely integrated. When the construction of Tech was completed in 1942, Northwestern received an additional bequest of $28 million from Walter P. Murphy's estate to provide for an engineering school "second to none."

To make room for the new building, the Phi Kappa Psi fraternity house and the Dearborn Observatory were moved, and the original Patten Gymnasium was demolished. Ground was broken for the new building on April 1, 1940, and the building was dedicated on June 15–16, 1942. The building was designed by the architectural firm of Holabird & Root in the shape of two letter E's, placed back to back and joined by a central structure. When it was built it was the largest building on Northwestern's Evanston campus.

In 1961, construction began on two new wings, which were added to the eastern ends of the building, along with additions to the library and physics wing. The expansion, dedicated in October 1963, was prompted by a $3.4 million contract awarded by the Advanced Research Agency of the Department of Defense. In 1973, a new entrance terrace was dedicated, and in 1999, a ten-year, $125 million renovation of the Technological institute was completed. This renovation, undertaken by Skidmore, Owings & Merrill, included extensive reconstruction of the interior of the original 1940 structure, replacing the mechanical, plumbing, and electrical systems, and reconfiguring the laboratory and research space.

Additional buildings have been constructed around the original Technological Institute, connected together by pedestrian bridges to create what has been called the "Technological Campus". Among them are the Seeley G. Mudd Library for Science and Engineering opened in 1977, the Center for Catalysis and Surface Science in 1986, and Cook Hall in 1989. More recent additions to the "Technological Campus" include Hogan Hall, the Pancoe Life Sciences Pavilion, the Center for Nanofabrication, and the Ford Motor Company Engineering Design Center.
