= Northwestern University Libraries =

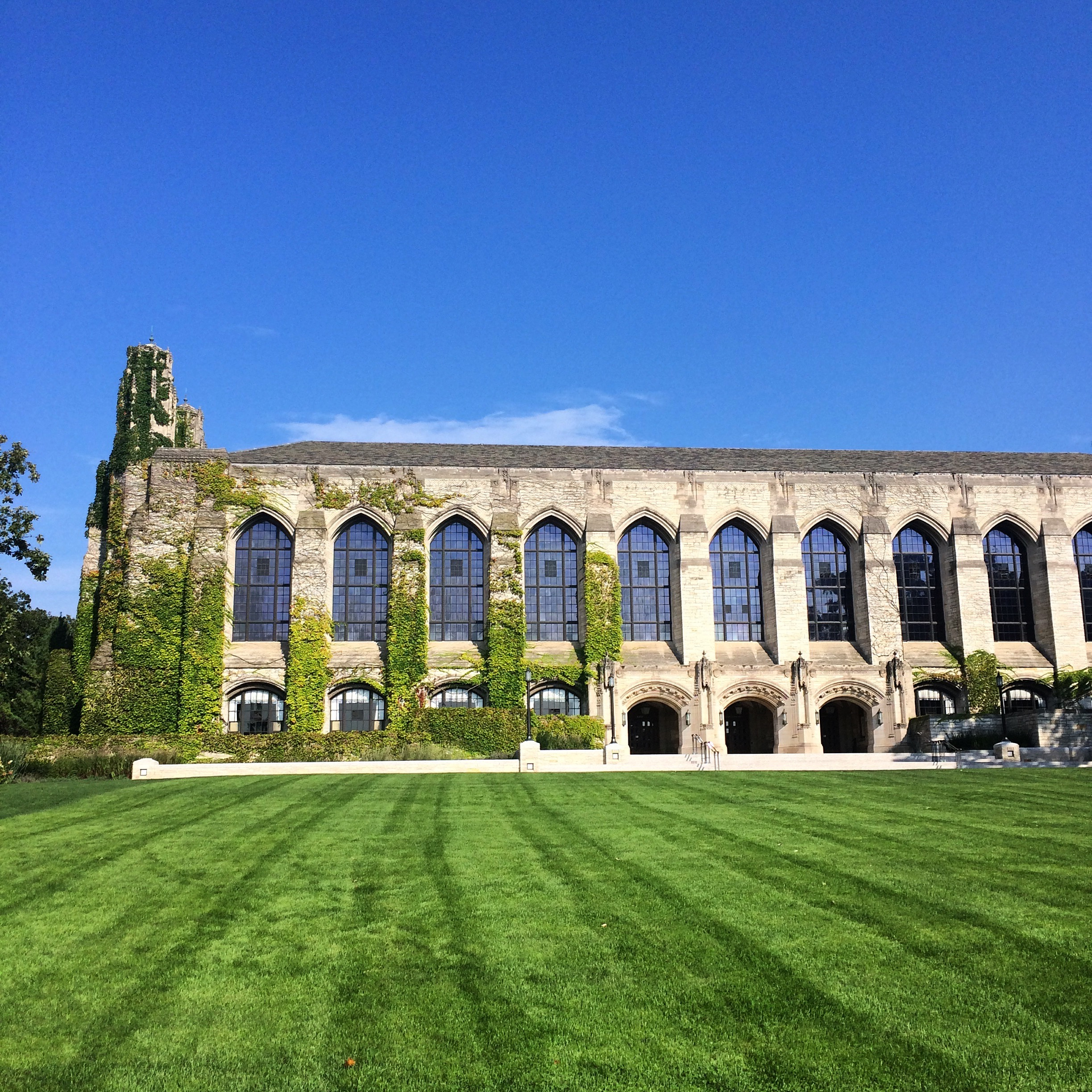
- Deering Library
- 42°03′11″N 87°40′27″W
- Location: Evanston, Illinois
- Type: Academic library system of Northwestern University
- Established: 1856
- Architects: SOM, Walter Netsch
- Branches: 5

Collection
- Items collected: more than 8.1 million items, 107,446 print journals, 173,089 electronic journals, 142,133 audio files, 100,560 films and videos and 228,505 maps.
- Size: more than 8.1 million items (2022)

Other information
- Employees: 283 total, including 120 professional staff, 107 support staff and 56 FTE student staff (2019)
- Website: library.northwestern.edu

Northwestern University Libraries is the academic library system of Northwestern University.

Northwestern Libraries host a total of 8,198,268 printed or electronic volumes. In addition, its libraries contain 229,198 maps, 211,127 audio files, 103,377 printed journals, 196,716 electronic journals, 91,334 movies or videos, 36,989 manuscripts, 4.6 million microforms, and almost 99,000 periodicals. The University Library is the 14th-largest university library in North America based on total number of titles held.

The main library building was designed in brutalist style by Walter Netsch of Skidmore, Owings & Merrill. Construction started in 1966 and the library opened in 1970. University Library succeeded Deering Library as the main library on campus and is connected to it. Along with the other institutions in the Committee on Institutional Cooperation, University Library joined the Google Book Search project on June 6, 2007.

== Library collections ==
- Melville J. Herskovits Library of African Studies: established in 1954, and named after Melville J. Herskovits, the Herskovits Library is the largest separate Africana collection in existence. The collection includes more than 400,000 volumes (including 20,000 in African languages), 250 current newspapers and 6,000 non-circulating rare books.
- The Music Library: contains extensive holdings of printed music and archival materials documenting music composed since 1945. The collection includes more than 300,000 items, including the John Cage collection.
- Transportation Library: one of the largest transportation information centers in the world with a collection of over 500,000 items covering air, rail, highway, pipeline, water, urban transport and logistics.
- The Art Library: the Art Library holds over 160,000 books and journals about art, architecture, and design, with particular strength in 19th century art and architecture.
- Charles Deering McCormick Library of Special Collections
- Northwestern University Archives
- Pritzker Legal Research Center: the library is located on the Chicago campus and serves the Northwestern University Pritzker School of Law.
- Seeley G. Mudd Library: Located on North Campus, Mudd Library was renovated in 2017 with collaboration and technology in mind.
- Styberg Library: the theological library serves the Garrett–Evangelical Theological Seminary and Bexley Seabury.
- Charles Deering Memorial Library: built in 1933, and named for Charles Deering, the library houses the art library, the Charles Deering McCormick Library of Special Collections, the Music Library and University Archives.
- Boas Mathematics Library: the library serves primarily the Mathematics Department and Statistics Department and has a research collection in pure mathematics and statistics of around 34,000 volumes.

== Initiatives ==
Northwestern University Library is a partner with the Native American Education Services College (NAES), the American Indian Association of Illinois, and Northwestern University's Center for Native American and Indigenous Research in the NAES College Digital Library Project, which preserves the NAES College library and archives.
