= Anthony James Esler =

American historian and novelist

Anthony Esler
- Born: Anthony James Esler; February 20, 1934 (age 92); New London, Connecticut, U.S.
- Citizenship: American
- Occupations: Historian, novelist, professor
- Known for: World history textbooks, conflict of generations studies, historical novels
- Spouse(s): Carol Eaton Clemeau (m. 1961, div. 1988); Helen Campbell Walker (m. 1992)
- Children: 2

Academic background
- Education: University of Arizona (BA); Duke University (MA, PhD)

Academic work
- Discipline: World history, Early modern Europe
- Institutions: College of William & Mary

Anthony James Esler (born February 20, 1934) is an American historian, novelist, and educator. He is an emeritus professor of history at the College of William & Mary in Williamsburg, Virginia, where he taught for most of his career. He is well known for his numerous textbooks on world history and Western civilization, as well as his research into the conflict of generations throughout history.

== Early life and education ==
Esler was born in New London, Connecticut. He got his Bachelor of Arts degree from the University of Arizona in 1956. He then attended Duke University, where he earned a Master of Arts in 1958 and a Doctor of Philosophy in 1961. After completing his PhD, he was a Fulbright Post-doctoral Research Fellow at the University of London from 1961 to 1962.

== Academic career ==
Esler joined the faculty of the College of William & Mary in 1962 as an Assistant Professor. He became an Associate Professor in 1967 and a full Professor of History in 1972, a position he held until his retirement in 1999. Over the years, he received several fellowships and grants, including an American Council of Learned Societies Research Fellowship (1969-1970) and a Fulbright Travel Grant to the Ivory Coast and Tanzania in 1983. He was also a William and Mary Research Fellow in 1975-76. His papers, primarily consisting of research materials on youth revolts and anti-Vietnam War movements in the 1960s and 1970s, are held in the Special Collections Research Center at the Swem Library, College of William & Mary.

== Publications ==
Esler has written extensively on world history, generational conflict, and early modern England. His academic works include The Aspiring Mind of the Elizabethan Younger Generation (1966), Bombs, Beards and Barricades: 150 Years of Youth in Revolt (1971), and Generations in History: An Introduction to the Concept (1982). He also edited The Youth Revolution: The Conflict of Generations in Modern History (1974). He also published Generational Studies: A Basic Bibliography (1979). He also published The Generation Gap in Society and History: A Select Bibliography (1984). The Aspiring Mind was reviewed in the American Historical Review in 1967. It was also reviewed in Renaissance Quarterly in 1968. It was also reviewed in the Canadian Historical Review in 1968.

He is perhaps best known for his widely used textbooks, including The Human Venture: A World History (first published in 1986, with a fifth edition in 2004) and The Western World: A History (1994). He also co-authored A Survey of Western Civilization (1987). He also co-authored the popular high school textbook World History: Connections to Today with Elisabeth Gaynor Ellis. In addition to his scholarly work, Esler has written several historical novels, including The Blade of Castlemayne (1974), Hellbane (1975), Lord Libertine (1976), Forbidden City (1977), For Love of a Pirate (1978), The Freebooters (1979), and Babylon (1980), as well as Bastion (1980).

== Personal life ==
Esler married Carol Eaton Clemeau in 1961, and they had two sons together before divorcing in 1988. He later married Helen Campbell Walker in 1992. He is a member of the American Historical Association, the World History Association, the Authors Guild, and Amnesty International.
