= Richard L. Lieber =

American muscle physiologist (born 1956)

Rick Lieber
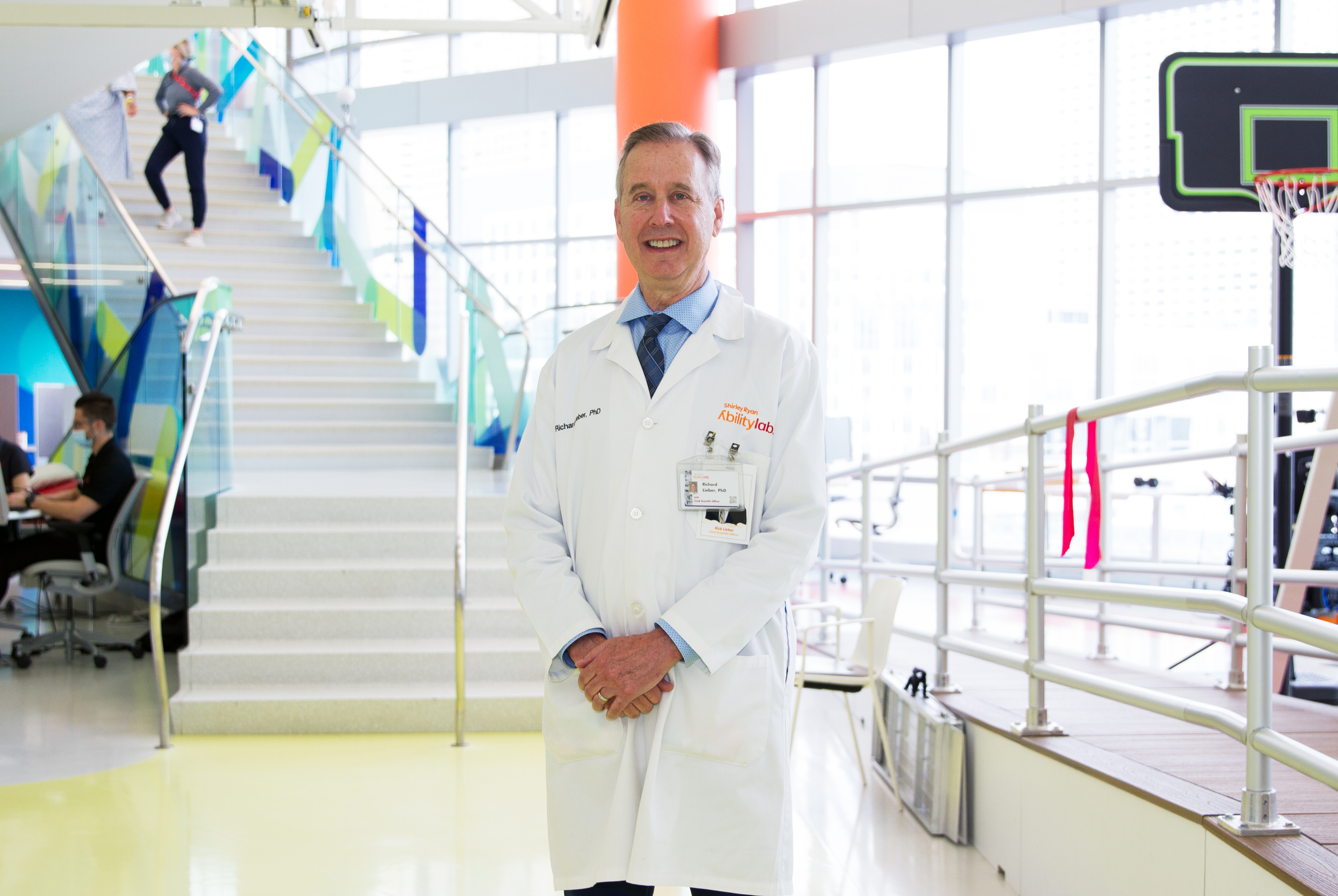
- Born: Richard L. Lieber; December 14, 1956 (age 69); Walnut Creek, California
- Education: University of California, Davis (BS, Ph.D) University of California, San Diego (Postdoc, MBA)
- Scientific career
- Fields: Physiology, Anatomy, Biology, Biomedical Engineering
- Workplaces: Shirley Ryan AbilityLab Northwestern University
- Website: https://www.sralab.org/researchers/richard-lieber-phd

Richard (Rick) L. Lieber (born December 14, 1956) is an American scientist in the field of muscle physiology who is an internationally recognized expert in skeletal muscle structure and function. He currently serves as the Chief Scientific Officer and Senior Vice President at the Shirley Ryan AbilityLab and as a Professor at Northwestern University. His research focuses on skeletal muscle properties in individuals with neurological disorders such as spinal cord injury or cerebral palsy to identify targets for therapeutic interventions. Among his premier professional honors are the Paul B. Magnuson Award and the prestigious Kappa Delta Award, which is widely described within the scientific community as the Nobel Prize of Orthopaedic Research.

== Early life and education ==
Dr. Lieber was born in Walnut Creek, California, the son of a big band musician and hospital administrator. He completed a B.S. in physiology in 1978 at University of California, Davis. In 1983, he earned his Ph.D. in biophysics with an electrical engineering minor from the Department of Zoology at the University of California, Davis, where he applied a theory of light diffraction to study mechanical properties of muscle cells and became one of the first to use the Intel 8080 microprocessor to control a biological system in real-time. He received his M.B.A. in 2013 from Rady School of Management, at the University of California, San Diego.

== Career ==
Lieber began his career as a Biomedical Engineer at the Veterans Administration Medical Center in 1983 before entering academia at the University of California, San Diego (UCSD) as an Assistant Professor of Surgery in 1985. Over nearly three decades at UCSD, he advanced to full Professor within the Department of Orthopaedics and Bioengineering, eventually serving as the Co-Director of the Center for Musculoskeletal Research and Director of the National Skeletal Muscle Research Center from 2005 to 2014.

In 2014, Lieber transitioned to Chicago to accept dual high-level institutional appointments. He currently serves as the Chief Scientific Officer and Senior Vice President at Shirley Ryan AbilityLab (formerly the Rehabilitation Institute of Chicago), a nationally recognized translational rehabilitation research hospital. Concurrently, he serves as a Professor in the Departments of Physiology, Biomedical Engineering, and Physical Medicine & Rehabilitation at Northwestern University. In addition to his leadership in clinical and academic rehabilitation spaces, Lieber continues his longstanding service with the federal government as a Senior Research Career Scientist for the Department of Veterans Affairs at the Edward Hines Jr. Veterans Administration Hospital.

== Research ==
Lieber has published over 400 articles in peer-reviewed scientific journals ranging from basic science such as The Journal of Cell Biology to clinical research such as The Journal of Hand Surgery. He is an established expert in using biological approaches to understand muscle contractures in neurological conditions such as cerebral palsy, stroke and spinal cord injury. Lieber's work includes the development of pharmacological and surgical interventions to improve muscle function in individuals with neurological conditions. He has made significant contributions to the field of muscle physiology in the area of in vivo muscle measurements, and he is highly referenced in scientific journals.

His most often cited paper is "Functional and clinical significance of skeletal muscle architecture" in the peer-reviewed journal Muscle & Nerve with 1447 citations. As of November 2026, his work has garnered over 41,822 citations in the scientific community and his h-index is 102. In addition to his publications in peer-reviewed journals, he authored the widely recognized textbook, "Skeletal Muscle Structure, Function, and Plasticity," which is currently in its 3rd edition and has been translated into both Japanese and Spanish.

== Distinctions ==
Although not a surgeon himself, Lieber has lived and worked extensively within the surgeon's world, establishing an impact on surgical reconstruction for spinal cord injuries. His global academic career is highlighted by an international collaboration spanning over 40 years and 75 co-authored papers with Jan Fridén, M.D., Ph.D. at the University of Gothenburg, culminating in a joint review on the core dynamics of effective surgeon-scientist partnership. He has also maintained professional collaborations with Eva Pontén at the Karolinska Institute, and Allistair Rothwell at Christ Church, New Zealand. His global academic impact includes delivering high-profile international addresses, such as the General Chair Opening Address at Rehabweek (2025) and serving as a Distinguished Speaker at Abu Dhabi Global Health Week (2025).

In 2021, Lieber received the prestigious Shihan designation from the International Paralympic Committee. He also serves as a member of the scientific advisory board of the NFL and has six patents on surgical techniques, methods to measure muscle fibers, and methods to administer stimulation to skeletal muscles

== Awards and honors ==
Lieber has received a number of awards and honors throughout his career. These include:

Outstanding Leadership & Compassion Award, Institute of Medicine of Chicago, Chicago, IL, June 2024

Elsass Foundation Research Prize, June 2023

Paul B. Magnuson Award, Rehabilitation Research and Development, Department of Veterans Affairs, March 2023

Goel Award for Translational Biomechanics, North American Congress on Biomechanics (NACOB), American Society for Biomechanics, August 2022, Ottawa, Ontario, Canada.

Lifetime Achievement Award, American Academy of Cerebral Palsy and Developmental Medicine, 2021

Fellow, Orthopaedic Research Society (ORS), November 2020

Fellow, American Institute of Medical and Biological Engineering (AIMBE), March 2019

Hay Award in Sport Biomechanics, American Society of Biomechanics, August 2017

Honorary Member, American Physical Therapy Association, February 2015

Founders Award, American College of Sports Medicine (Southwest Chapter), October 2014.

Gayle G. Arnold Award, American Academy of Cerebral Palsy and Developmental Medicine, October 2013

Kappa Delta Award, American Academy of Orthopaedic Surgeons, February 2013, Chicago, IL.

Fellow, American Society for Biomechanics, July 2012

Outstanding Research Award, International Society for the Study of the Lumbar Spine (ISSLS), Göteborg, Sweden. June 2011.

Giovanni Borelli Award, American Society of Biomechanics, August, 2007.

The Göteborg University Medal, Sahlgrenska University Hospital, June 2007.

Fulbright Scholarship (Sweden), 2007

Nicolas Andry Award, American Bone and Joint Surgeons, Vancouver, British Columbia, Canada, May 2002

Fellow, American College of Sports Medicine, March, 1994.

Kappa Delta Young Investigator Award, American Academy of Orthopaedic Surgeons, February 1994.

== Publications ==
Selected publications

1. Lieber, R.L. and R.J. Baskin. (1983). Intersarcomere dynamics of single skeletal muscle fibers during fixed-end tetani. J. Gen. Physiol. 82:347-364. PMC2228698.
2. Lieber, R.L., R.J. Baskin and Y. Yeh. (1984). Sarcomere length determination using laser diffraction: effect of beam and fiber diameter. Biophys. J. 45:1007-1016. PMC1434983.
3. Lieber RL, Yeh Y, Baskin RJ. Sarcomere length determination using laser diffraction. Effect of beam and fiber diameter. Biophysical Journal. 1984;45:1007-16
4. Lieber, R.L. and J.L. Boakes. (1988). Sarcomere length and joint kinematics during torque production in the frog hindlimb. Am. J. Physiol. 254:C759-C768. PMID3259840
5. Lieber, R.L. and F.T. Blevins. (1989). Skeletal muscle architecture of the rabbit hindlimb: Functional implications of muscle design. J. Morphol. 199:93-101. PMID2921772
6. Lieber, R.L., M.E. Leonard, C.G. Brown, and C.L. Trestik. (1991). Frog semitendinosis tendon load-strain and stress-strain properties during passive loading. Am. J. Physiol. 261:C86-C92. PMID1858862
7. Lieber, R.L., Raab, R., Kashin, S. and V.R. Edgerton (1992). Sarcomere length changes during fish swimming. J. Exp. Biol. 169:251-254. PMID11536506
8. Lieber RL, Baskin RJ, Yeh Y. (1984). Sarcomere length determination using laser diffraction: effect of beam and fiber diameter. Biophys. J. 45:1007-1016. PMC 434983
9. Lieber, R.L. G.J. Loren and J. Fridén. (1994). In vivo measurement of human wrist extensor muscle sarcomere length changes. J. Neurophysiol. 71:874-881. PMID8201427
10. Sam M, Shah S, Fridén J, Milner DJ, Capetanaki Y, Lieber RL. (2000). Desmin knockout muscles generate lower stress and are less vulnerable to injury compared to wildtype muscles. Am. J. Physiol. 279:C1116-1122. PMID 1003592.
11. Sam, M., S. Shah, J. Fridén, D.J. Milner, Y. Capetanaki and R.L. Lieber. (2000). Desmin knockout muscles generate lower stress and are less vulnerable to injury compared to wildtype muscles. Am. J. Physiol. 279:C1116-1122. PMID11003592
12. Lieber, R.L. and J. Fridén. (2002). Spasticity causes a fundamental rearrangement of muscle-joint interaction. Muscle & Nerve 25:265-270. PMID11870696
13. Lieber, R.L., J. Fridén, T. Hobbs, A.G. Rothwell. (2003). Analysis of posterior deltoid function one year after surgical restoration of elbow extension. J. Hand. Surg. (Am.) 28A:288-293. PMID 12671862.
14. Patel, T.J., R. Das, J. Fridén, G.J. Lutz and R.L. Lieber. (2004). Sarcomere strain and heterogeneity correlate with injury to frog skeletal muscle fiber bundles. J. Appl. Physiol. 97:1803-1813. PMID15208284
15. Lieber, R.L., W. Murray, D.L. Clark, V.R. Hentz and J. Fridén. (2005). Biomechanical properties of the brachioradialis muscle: Implications for surgical tendon transfer. J. Hand Surg. (Am.) 30:273-282. PMID15781349.
16. Hentzen, E.R., M. Lahey, D. Peters, L. Mathew, I.A. Barash, J. Fridén and R.L. Lieber. (2006). Stress-dependent and -independent expression of the myogenic regulatory factors and the MARP genes after eccentric contractions in rats. J. Physiol. (Lond.) 570:157-167. PMC1464283
17. Smith, L.R., K.S. Lee, S.R. Ward, H.G. Chambers, R.L. Lieber. (2011) Hamstring contractures in children with spastic cerebral palsy result from a stiffer ECM and increased in vivo sarcomere length. J. Physiol. (Lond.) 589:2625-2639. PMID 21486759.
18. Palmisano, M.G., S.N. Bremner, S. Huang, A.A. Domenighetti, T. Hornberger, S.B. Shah, M. Kellermeyer, A.F. Ryan, and R.L. Lieber. (2014). Skeletal muscle intermediate filaments act as a stress-transmitting and stress-transducing signaling network. J. Cell Sci.128:219-224. PMC4294770
19. Young KW, Radic S, Myslivets E, Lieber RL. (2014). Resonant reflection spectroscopy of biomolecular arrays in muscle. Biophys. J. 107:2352-2360. PMID 25418304.
20. Young, K.W., S. Radic, E. Myslivets, and R.L. Lieber. (2014). Resonant reflection spectroscopy of biomolecular arrays in muscle. Biophys. J. 107:2352-2360. PMC4241457.
21. Palmisano, M.G., S.N. Bremner, A.A. Domenighetti, T. Hornberger, S.B. Shah, M. Kellermeyer, A.F. Ryan, and R.L. Lieber. (2014). Skeletal muscle intermediate filaments act as a stress-transmitting and stress-transducing signaling network. J. Cell Sci. 128:219-224. PMID 25413344.
22. Mathewson, M.A., S.R. Ward, H.G. Chambers and R.L. Lieber. (2014). High resolution muscle measurements provide insight into equinus contracture in patients with cerebral palsy. J. Orthop Res. 33:33-39. PMC2903973
23. Young, K.W., B.P.P Kuo, S.M. O'Connor, S. Radic and R.L. Lieber. (2017). In vivo sarcomere length measurement in whole muscles during passive stretch and twitch contractions. Biophys. J. 112:805-812. PMID 28256239.
24. Domenighetti, A., M.A. Mathewson, R. Pichika, L. Zhao, H.G. Chambers and R.L. Lieber. (2018). Loss of myogenic potential and fusion capacity of satellite cells isolated from contractured muscle in children with cerebral palsy. Am. J. Physiol. 315:C247-C257. PMID 29694232.
25. Roy I, Binder-Markey B, Sychowski D, et al. (2024) Gait speed is a translational marker of cancer-associated cachexia. J. Appl. Physiol. 136(4):811-822. PMID 38358249.
26. Son J, Ward SR, Lieber RL. (2024). Scaling relationships between human leg muscle architectural properties and body size. J Exp. Biol. 227(8): jeb246736. PMID 38511732.
27. Potluri T, You T, Yin P, et al. (2025). Estrogen receptor-α ablation reverses muscle fibrosis and inguinal hernias. J. Clin. Invest. 135(3):e182390. PMID 39561245.
28. Wang Z, Persad LS, Binder-Markey BI, et al. (2025). In-vivo human gracilis muscle active force-length relationship is explained by the sliding filament theory. J. Physiol. (Lond.). 603(4):721-736. PMID 39712530.
29. Deng W, Hoang B, Rubsam M et al. (2026). Concurrent and Convergent Validity of the Bayley-4, AIMS, and HINE Assessments in 1-Year-Old Infants. Dev. Med. Child Neurol. 68(2):214-222. PMID 40123567.
30. Barbar A, Willbanks A, Meza G, et al. (2026). Ultrasound- guided skeletal muscle biopsy technique permits measurement of muscle structure, functional and biochemical properties. Sci. Rep. 16(1):4321. PMID 40234578.
31. Sliwa JA, Carpenter J, Bodine AJ, et al. (2026). AbilityQuotient dashboard: Outcomes of implementing patient-specifics predictive modeling in inpatient team conference. Arch. Phys. Med Rehab,107(3):511-520 PMID 40345689.
