= Theodore Wesley Koch =

American librarian

- Born: August 4, 1871; Philadelphia
- Died: March 23, 1941; Evanston Hospital
- Occupations: Librarian, veterinarian, pet breeder
- Employer: Northwestern University

Theodore Wesley Koch (August 4, 1871 – March 23, 1941) was the Director of Northwestern University's library (1919–1941), and the Director of the University of Michigan Library (1905–1915). He also held positions at the Cornell University Library and the Library of Congress.

== Biography ==
At Harvard, c. 1893

Koch was born in Philadelphia in 1871, the son of William Jefferson Koch (pronounced by the family as "coke") a descendant of German immigrants ("Pennsylvania Dutch"). Koch receive a BA from the University of Pennsylvania, followed by a second BA and an MA from Harvard University (1893 and 1894 respectively) in Romance Languages. He went on to study in Paris, before returning to Cornell University, where he was responsible for producing a detailed, annotated catalogue of Cornell's extensive collection of Dante's works.

During World War I, while on the staff of the Library of Congress, Koch played an instrumental role in ensuring that scientific publications from Germany and other combatants continued to be available to American researchers. He also organized programs to provide books to American soldiers in the trenches.

After the end of the war Koch was very active in organizing American support for the rebuilding of European libraries that had been destroyed during the war.

Koch was the Director of the Library of Northwestern University (1919–1941), during which time he planned and raised the funds for the Deering Library at Northwestern. His bust is carved into a pillar next to the entrance to the stacks.

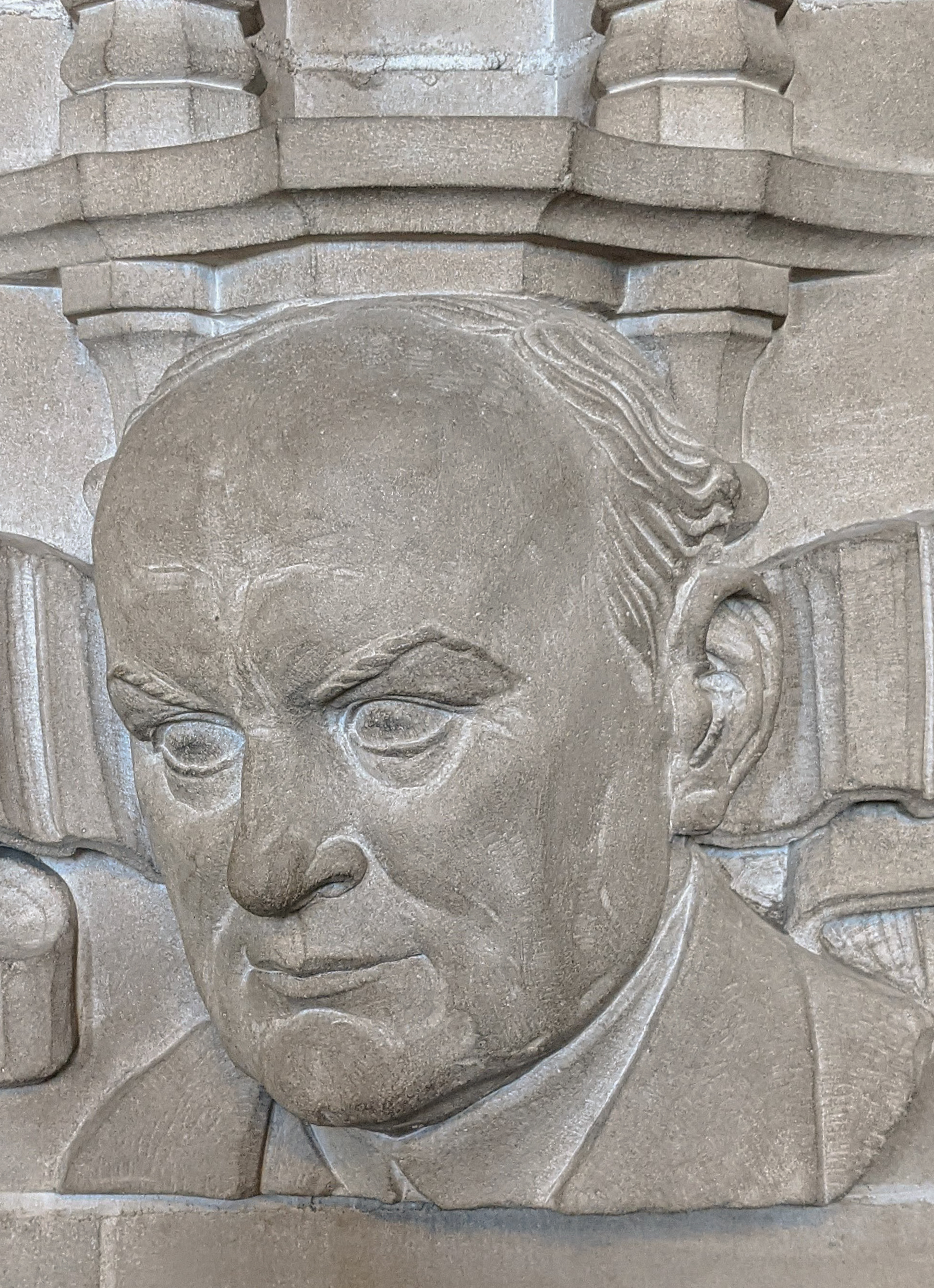
Bust of Theodore Wesley Koch at stack entrance in Deering Library

He was a translator of Italian poetry and essays; scholar of Dante; widely published on issues of libraries and public education from the 1910s to the late 1930s.

In 1940 he received the Cross of the Legion of Honor from the French Government, for his lifelong work in translating, promoting, and enhancing the appreciation of French literature in the United States. He translated a series of books on French bibliophiles.

He died from heart disease at Evanston Hospital on March 23, 1941, a few months short of his scheduled retirement.

== Selected publications ==
- Koch, Theodore Wesley. 1897. Dante in America; a Historical and Bibliographical Study. Boston: Ginn and Company (for the Dante Society).
- Koch, Theodore Wesley, Willard Fiske, and Mary Fowler. 1898. Catalogue of the Dante Collection. Cornell University.
- Koch, Theodore Wesley. 1915. Concerning Book Plates. Papers of the Bibliographical Society of America.
- Koch, Theodore Wesley. 1917. A Book of Carnegie Libraries. White Plains, N.Y.: The H.W. Wilson Company.
- Koch, Theodore Wesley, and C. B. Falls. 1919. Books in the War: The Romance of Library War Service. Boston: Houghton Mifflin Company.
- Koch, Theodore Wesley. 1919. The University of Louvain and Its Library, by Theodore Wesley Koch .. Norwood: The Plimpton Press.
- Koch, T. W. 1934. "New light on old libraries". Library Quarterly, 4, 244–252.

== Selected translations ==
- Bonnardot, A., Lakeside Press (Chicago, Ill), and R.R. Donnelley and Sons Company. 1931. The Mirror of the Parisian Bibliophile : A Satirical Tale. Translated by Theodore Wesley Koch. Chicago: [Printed at the Lakeside Press].
- Flaubert, Gustave. 1929. Bibliomania: A Tale. Translated by Theodore Wesley Koch. Evanston, Illinois: Northwestern University Library.
- Nodier, Charles. 1929. Francesco Colonna; a Fanciful Tale of the Writing of the Hypnerotomachia. Translated by Theodore Wesley Koch. Chicago: Privately printed.
- Zweig, Stefan, Northwestern University (Evanston, Ill). Library, Lakeside Press (Chicago, Ill), and R.R. Donnelley and Sons Company. 1937. The Old-Book Peddler and Other Tales for Bibliophiles. Translated by Theodore Wesley Koch. Evanston, Illinois: Northwestern University, The Charles Deering Library.
