= Mysore University Library =

- Location: Mysuru, Karnataka, India
- Type: academic
- Established: 1918; 107 years ago

The Mysore University Library serves the academic community of the University of Mysore at the located in Mysore, Hassan and Mandya. The Library is the largest and also oldest among the University Libraries in the southern Indian State of Karnataka.

== Collection ==
The library was started with 2,311 volumes. It has today a resource collection of nearly 7.5 lakh documents in its system and a membership of 5600 users, including 600 Faculty members, 600 Researchers, 3,500 PG Students, 500 Office Staff, and 400 Graduates of Mysore City. The Mysore University Library offers a collection of over 2,400 journal titles and 1 lakh volumes of journals.

=== Special collections ===
The library has a rich collection of books relating to "History of Mysore" and administrative reports on the princely State of Mysore, including works on Indian Painting, art and architecture. The library supports the Oriental Research Institute, including manuscripts in Sanskrit, Kannada and Telugu manuscripts. The entire special collection constitutes 84,000 works in 29,000 volumes. The annual publication of Mysore Orientalist provides information about the continuing growth of the collection and about research activities involving this source material.

The digitization of the rare books in the Mysore library is to be accomplished in partnership with Google. There are around 100,000 manuscripts in the Mysore University Library. These manuscripts are written on relatively fragile paper and palm leaves, some dating back to the eighth century. The library has identified the manuscripts which are to be digitized first. These include subjects as diverse as ayurveda, mathematics, medicine, science, astrology and economy.

== See also ==
- Google Books Library Project
