= Orphan works in the United States =

Works without identifiable owners

Seal of the United States Copyright Office

An orphan work is a work whose copyright owner is impossible to identify or contact. This inability to request permission from the copyright owner often means orphan works cannot be used in new works or digitized, except when fair use exceptions apply. Until recently, public libraries could not digitize orphaned books without risking being fined up to $150,000 if the owner of the copyright were to come forward. This problem was briefly addressed in the 2011 case Authors Guild, Inc. v. Google, but the settlement in that case was later overturned.

== History ==
The orphan works problem arose in the United States from the Copyright Act of 1976, which eliminated the need to register copyrighted works. Instead, according to 17 U.S.C. § 102, all "original works of authorship fixed in any tangible medium of expression" are automatically granted copyright protection. This Act made obtaining and maintaining copyright protection substantially easier than the previous Copyright Act of 1909. It also made unnecessary any central recording system to track and identify copyright-holders, but also made it difficult to find or contact the creator of a copyrighted work if the person or organization was not readily known. Thus, any use of the orphaned work outside of what is permitted as fair use is potentially a violation of copyright. Potential users of orphaned works are often not willing to take on that risk of copyright violation, so they may individually investigate the copyright status of each work they plan to use.

To some, this scenario is not in the public interest; it limits works that are available to the public. It also discourages the creation of new works that incorporate existing works. Creators who want to use an orphan work are often unwilling to do so for fear that they will have to pay a huge amount of money in damages if the owner ever appears; the risk of additional liability or litigation may be too high. This makes the work of historians, archivists, artists, scholars, and publishers at times more difficult and costly than necessary. The issue arises in Wikipedia, where the copyright owner of a photo that would have illustrated an article may be unknown.

Libraries and archives do have limited privileges to make copies of certain orphan works under section H of 17 U.S.C. § 108.

== US Copyright Office Studies and Reports ==
In January 2006, the United States Copyright Office released a report on orphan works. This report was the culmination of a year-long study conducted by the office, based on open forums from the public to collect input.

In it, the Copyright Office states that new legislation is desperately needed to address the orphan works problem. The report proposed that if a nonprofit organization such as a library used an orphan work and the copyright owner came forward, then the library would be exempt from huge copyright infringement fines as long as it stopped using the orphan work right away. Commercial uses of an orphan work in which the owner came forward would only be charged a "reasonable compensation" of the profits, and use of the work would be allowed to continue.

The Office's proposed solution was criticized from both sides. Some academics thought that it favored publishers, and disfavored archivists and scholars. Authors objected that the definition of orphan works would include many works that are being actively exploited, and would deprive authors of income from those works.

In June 2015, another report was released focusing on orphan works and mass digitization.

== Orphan works legislation ==
Beginning in May 2006, various legislative bills have been introduced in Congress aimed at addressing the issue of orphan works. As of 2016, Congress has not yet passed any legislation.

In 2018, the Music Modernization Act established a framework for orphan work sound recordings to be used: the user must submit the orphan work to the United States Copyright Office, at which point any copyright holder will be given 90 days to come forward and object to its use. If no rights holder emerges, or if the user successfully establishes the use is a noncommercial fair use of the recording, the recording may be used freely.

== Attempts to make orphan works available ==
The University of Michigan (UM) had started an orphan works project in an effort to make orphan works published between 1923 and 1963 on HathiTrust available to the UM community. However, the project was put on hold as of September 2011 in the wake of a lawsuit filed against HathiTrust, UM, and four other member universities by the Authors Guild, Australian and Canadian authors' organizations, and eight authors to stop them from "reproducing, distributing and/or displaying" copyrighted works. This case was settled in HathiTrust's favor in Authors Guild, Inc. v. HathiTrust on January 6, 2015.

The Internet Archive in October 2017 started making available online some orphan works published between 1923 and 1941 inclusive, forming a collection called the "Sonny Bono memorial" (after Sonny Bono, an entertainer and advocate for perpetual copyright for whom the Copyright Term Extension Act was named). The effort is made possible by 17 U.S.C. § 108(h) when applied according to some actionable criteria proposed by scholars.

== See also ==
- Abandonware
- Orphan film
- Public domain
- Books in the United States
