= Shawn Bentley Orphan Works Act of 2008 =

US Senate copyright bill

The Shawn Bentley Orphan Works Act of 2008, also known as S.2913, was a bill legislated by the United States Senate on April 24, 2008. It was sponsored by Senator Patrick Leahy (D-VT) with Senator Robert Bennett (R-UT) and Senator Orrin Hatch (R-UT) as co-sponsors. It was referred to a committee and then reported by the committee on May 15, 2008.

== Summary ==
The bill was designed to provide limitations on the judicial branch from remedying copyright infringement cases remedying orphan works. Orphan works are copyrighted works for which the copyright owners cannot be identified and contacted. The infringing party has to meet several limits though in order to avoid legal penalties: a.) the infringing party performed and documented a reasonably diligent search in good faith to locate and identify the copyright owner before using the work, but was unable to locate and identify the owner, b.) the infringing use of the work provided attribution to the owner of the copyright, if known.

Essentially, it was to limit monetary compensation, to what was described to be a reasonable standard, for infringed work if the infringing party was unable to locate the owner of the work ("due diligence"). It prohibited reasonable compensation if the infringing party was a non-profit educational institution, museum, library, or archive, or a public broadcasting entity, had tried to locate and contact the copyright owner, as well as immediately removed the copyrighted material if the owners of the works request it.

== Reason for non-passage ==
Sessions of Congress last two years and any bills proposed in that session must be dealt with in that two-year span. At the end of each congressional session, according to the bylaws of passing legislation, bills and resolutions that are not passed are cleared from the books. Discussion on the bill was stymied by senators who had no interest in passing the bill.
