= Northwestern University Archives =

The Northwestern University Archives, established in 1935, holds thousands of cubic feet of material pertaining to every aspect of the history of its host institution, Northwestern University. The University Archives serves as the repository for both non-current official Northwestern University records and a wide variety of other material including the papers of individual faculty members, the records of student organizations, holdings which pertain to individual students and alumni, photographs, and artifacts. The University Archives' holdings are open for research and reference use and are non-circulating.

The collection includes well over 1,000 separate University-generated serial publications including newsletters of student organizations, official departmental reports, and catalogs and bulletins from each of Northwestern's schools and colleges. Of particular interest are complete runs of the Daily Northwestern, the school newspaper, and the Syllabus, the student yearbook.

The University Archives holds a considerable body of biographical materials relating to Northwestern faculty, staff, alumni, and others associated with the university. The department also holds a considerable volume of material relating to campus culture including photographs documenting all manner of school activities. Student diaries, scrapbooks, and curricular materials are well represented. The University Archives also holds the records, including the poster collection, of Amazingrace Coffeehouse. The University Archives maintains thousands of motion picture films, videotapes, and audio recordings of Northwestern events.
