= Authors Guild =

American professional organization

- Formation: 1912; 114 years ago
- Tax ID no.: 13-2509231
- Legal status: 501(c)(6) organization
- Purpose: Advocacy
- Headquarters: New York City, U.S.
- Members: 9,000
- Council President: Ralph Eubanks
- Foundation President: Marie Arana
- Key people: Mary Rasenberger, CEO; Maya Shanbhag Lang, President
- Affiliations: IFJ
- Website: www.authorsguild.org
- Formerly called: Authors League of America

The Authors Guild is the United States' oldest and largest professional organization for writers and provides advocacy on issues of free expression and copyright protection. Since its founding in 1912 as the Authors League of America, it has counted among its board members notable authors of fiction, nonfiction, and poetry, including numerous winners of the Nobel and Pulitzer Prizes and National Book Awards. It has over 9,000 members, who receive free legal advice and guidance on contracts with publishers as well as insurance services and assistance with subsidiary licensing and royalties.

The group lobbies at the national and state levels on censorship and tax concerns, and it has initiated or supported several major lawsuits in defense of authors' copyrights. In one of those, a class-action suit claiming that Google acted illegally when it scanned millions of copyrighted books without permission, the Authors Guild lost on appeal in the United States Court of Appeals for the Second Circuit.

On multiple occasions, Authors Guild has fought the consolidation of the publishing industry through the mergers of large publishers, and it has pressed the publishers to increase royalty rates for ebooks.

== History ==
The original Authors League of America was organized with headquarters in New York City in order "to protect the rights of all authors, whether engaged in literary, dramatic, artistic, or musical competition, and to advise and assist all such authors". In 1921, the Dramatists Guild of America split off as a separate group to represent writers of stage and, later, radio drama.

Past council presidents of the Authors Guild have included the novelists Pearl S. Buck, Rex Stout, Scott Turow, Douglas Preston and Madeleine L'Engle, the biographers Anne Edwards and Robert Caro, the journalists Herbert Mitgang and J. Anthony Lukas, the children's book author Mary Pope Osborne, and the historians William Shirer and Robert Massie. In 2014, the guild's members elected Roxana Robinson as president and Judy Blume as vice president. In 2023, the guild's members elected Maya Shanbhag Lang as president and Mary Bly as vice president.

The guild has been a persistent critic of controlled digital lending.

== Human Authored ==
The guild's Human Authored project offers authors the opportunity to certify that:

the text of the book was written by a human and not generated by AI, with the exception of minimal uses such as AI applications that check spelling and grammar or for research.

The certification is available for books published in the United States, and is free for members of the guild and available for a fee ($10 as of 2026) for non-members. Books with this certification are listed in an open-access database which can be checked online. Kit Eaton, writing in Inc. in October 2024 ahead of the launch of the project, suggested that the certification would be akin to food being labeled "organic".

== Legal cases ==
=== Freelancers' suit ===
In June 2014, the guild announced final approval of an $18-million settlement of a class-action suit it brought in 2000, along with the American Society of Journalists and Authors, the National Writers Union and 21 freelance writers. The suit claimed that major electronics databases such as Lexis-Nexis had violated the rights of thousands of freelancers. Their work had originally appeared in newspapers and magazines including The New York Times and Time magazine and had then been resold to the databases without the writers' permission.

The publishers had argued that the databases constituted a fair "revision" of the original print articles, but the United States Supreme Court ruled in June 2001 that the writers must be compensated for their digital rights. Further litigation and negotiation led to a settlement that provided payments to the freelancers of up to $1,500 per article. The specific amount depended on whether (and, if so, when) an infringed article had been registered with the U.S. Copyright Office.

=== Google Books ===
On September 20, 2005, the Authors Guild, together with Herbert Mitgang, Betty Miles and Daniel Hoffman, filed a class action lawsuit against Google for its Book Search project. According to the Authors Guild, Google was committing copyright infringement by making digital copies of books that were still protected by copyright. (Google countered that their use was fair according to US copyright law.)

On October 28, 2008, the Authors Guild, the Association of American Publishers, and Google announced that they had settled Authors Guild v. Google. Google agreed to a $125 million payout, $45 million of that to be paid to rightsholders whose books were scanned without permission. The Google Book Search Settlement Agreement allowed for legal protection for Google's scanning project, even though neither side changed its position about whether scanning books was fair use or copyright infringement. The Settlement also would have established a new regulatory organization, the Book Rights Registry, which would be responsible for allocating fees from Google to rightsholders.

The settlement between the Authors Guild and Google was rejected in 2011 by a judge at the district court level, who thought the settlement was not in the authors' best interest.

In October 2015, the United States Court of Appeals for the Second Circuit sided with Google citing fair use and that the scanned and posted excerpts works do not harm the authors by having parts of the books online.

In late December 2015, the Authors Guild filed a petition for writ of certiorari with the Supreme Court against Google in their long-standing battle over whether copyright laws allow for the search engine to scan and post excerpts from books for the Google Books service, which in April 2016 declined to review the case, leaving the lower court's decision standing.

=== HathiTrust ===
From 2012 to 2015, the Authors Guild was involved in a legal case regarding HathiTrust, a similar service to Google Books allowing the searching of copyrighted scanned books and the displaying of snippets. As in the Google Books case, this was found to be fair use, and the case was dropped.

=== NEH ===
In May 2025, the guild filed a class action lawsuit against the National Endowment for the Humanities (NEH) as well as Department of Government Efficiency (DOGE) officials for terminating $175 million in committed grants from Congressional funds. According to the filed lawsuit, the mass termination was considered to be "not only utterly unexpected and unprecedented—it was flagrantly unlawful", as these actions directly violated the Administrative Procedure Act. In May 2026, Judge Colleen McMahon ruled that the cuts were unconstitutional and ordered the restoration of the grants.

== Notable people ==
- Lucile Saunders McDonald (1898-1992), journalist, historian, and author

== See also ==
- Books in the United States
