= Big Ten Academic Alliance =

Academic consortium

- Formation: 1958
- Type: Consortium
- Headquarters: Champaign, Illinois, U.S.
- Location: United States
- Members: 18
- Chair: Nick Jones, Executive Vice President and Provost, Penn State
- Website: btaa.org

The Big Ten Academic Alliance (BTAA), formerly known as the Committee on Institutional Cooperation (CIC), is the academic consortium of the universities in the Big Ten Conference. The consortium was renamed on June 29, 2016.

== Member universities ==
The Big Ten Academic Alliance is an academic consortium of the 18 institutions that are members of the Big Ten Conference. The University of Chicago, a former Big Ten Conference member, was a member of the CIC from 1958 to June 29, 2016.

Current members:

- Indiana University Bloomington
- Michigan State University
- Northwestern University
- Ohio State University
- Pennsylvania State University (joined 1990)
- Purdue University
- Rutgers University–New Brunswick (joined 2013)
- University of California, Los Angeles (joined 2024)
- University of Illinois Urbana–Champaign
- University of Iowa
- University of Maryland, College Park (joined 2013)
- University of Michigan
- University of Minnesota, Twin Cities
- University of Nebraska–Lincoln (joined 2011)
- University of Oregon (joined 2024)
- University of Southern California (joined 2024)
- University of Washington (joined 2024)
- University of Wisconsin–Madison

Former member:

- University of Chicago (1958–2016)
Big Ten Academic Alliance
Location of Big Ten Academic Alliance members
1 Rutgers
2 Maryland
3 Penn State
4 Ohio State
5 Michigan
6 Michigan State
7 Indiana
8 Purdue
9 Illinois
10 Northwestern
11 Wisconsin
12 Iowa
13 Minnesota
14 Nebraska
15 USC
16 UCLA
17 Oregon
18 Washington

== History ==
The Committee on Institutional Cooperation was established by the presidents of the Big Ten members in 1958 as the conference's academic counterpart. An invitation extended to the University of Chicago, one of the founding members of the Big Ten who withdrew from the conference in 1946, was accepted.

Following its admittance to the Big Ten in 1990, the CIC invited Pennsylvania State University to join the consortium. The University of Nebraska–Lincoln also joined the consortium in 2011 following the school's admittance to the Big Ten.

The University of Maryland, College Park and Rutgers University, who joined the Big Ten in 2014, joined the consortium on July 1, 2013.

The University of California, Los Angeles, the University of Southern California, the University of Oregon, and the University of Washington joined the consortium on August 2, 2024.

On June 29, 2016, the name of the consortium was changed from "Committee on Institutional Cooperation" to "Big Ten Academic Alliance". The University of Chicago, a former Big Ten Conference member and former member of the CIC, is not a member of the rebranded consortium, but continues to participate in programs through an affiliation agreement.

== Statistics ==
When considered collectively, BTAA universities educate over 700,000 students, including approximately 525,000 full-time undergraduate students and over 175,000 full-time graduate students. BTAA universities award 29% of all agriculture Ph.D.s, 18% of engineering Ph.D.s, and 18% of humanities Ph.D.s in the United States annually.

BTAA members, when viewed collectively, conducted a combined total of $17.4 billion in funded research and BTAA libraries own over 140 million volumes.

Collectively, BTAA members employ approximately 57,000 full-time instructional staff.

== Collaboration ==
The BTAA's collaborative efforts span the academic enterprise of its members, including:

- cooperative purchasing and licensing
- course sharing
- professional development programs
- library resources
- information technology
- international collaborations
- faculty networking
- participant in Google Books Library Project

In 2023, the Alliance launched Big Ten Open Books, a project intended to make its university press titles freely available to readers.

== Cancer Research Consortium ==
A related institution to the BTAA, the Big Ten Cancer Research Consortium (BTCRC) unites the cancer research centers of Big Ten universities through collaborative oncology trials. 14 members of the BTAA are members of the BTCRC, as well as the University of Illinois Chicago (UIC). Plans are in place to expand membership to include the University of California Los Angeles, the University of Southern California, the University of Oregon, and the University of Washington with the addition of these universities to the Big Ten. Current member cancer centers are as follows:

- Indiana University Melvin and Bren Simon Comprehensive Cancer Center
- Michigan State University Cancer Research
- Robert H. Lurie Comprehensive Cancer Center of Northwestern University
- Ohio State University Comprehensive Cancer Center – Arthur G. James Cancer Hospital and Richard J. Solove Cancer Research Institute ("The James")
- Penn State Cancer Institute
- Purdue University Center for Cancer Research
- Rutgers Cancer Institute of New Jersey
- University of Illinois Cancer Center (UI Chicago)
- Cancer Center at Illinois (UI Urbana–Champaign)
- University of Iowa Holden Comprehensive Cancer Center
- University of Maryland Marlene and Stewart Greenbaum Comprehensive Cancer Center
- University of Michigan Rogel Cancer Center
- Masonic Cancer Center (University of Minnesota)
- Fred & Pamela Buffett Cancer Center (University of Nebraska)
- Fred Hutch Cancer Center (University of Washington)
- University of Wisconsin Carbone Cancer Center
