= List of Northwestern University buildings =

The list of Northwestern University buildings encompasses the two main campuses of Northwestern University, located in Evanston, Illinois and Chicago, Illinois. The Evanston site contains approximately 150 buildings on its 240-acre (0.97 km^{2}) campus. The downtown Chicago campus, of approximately 25 acres (0.10 km^{2}), is home to the Feinberg School of Medicine and Northwestern University Pritzker School of Law. Northwestern University also has an 11-acre (0.04 km^{2}) campus in Education City, a satellite campus complex in Doha, Qatar.

== Evanston campus ==
Northwestern's original Evanston, Illinois campus, located just north of Chicago on the shores of Lake Michigan, can be traced to 1851, one year after the institution's founding. The campus still hosts the majority of Northwestern's undergraduate programs, as well as several of its graduate and professional schools. Unlike many prestigious universities of the time, whose campuses were iteratively master-planned, buildings on the Evanston Campus range heavily in both architectural style and date, due in part to the university's historically fluctuating finances. The earliest buildings are of Victorian, Gothic-adjacent, Neoclassical, and Renaissance-Revival styles. Numerous buildings on the Evanston campus constructed from the early to mid-twentieth century, including lecture halls, student residences, and the university's flagship library, were commissioned in the Collegiate Gothic style by notable American campus architect James Gamble Rogers. In the postwar period, numerous brutalist projects were undertaken, including an expansion of the main library by Walter Netsch. Many of these buildings are located on the Northwestern University Lakefill, a 1964 landfill extension of Northwestern's campus into Lake Michigan. As the university's first and primary campus, Evanston has seen major development in the past decade, including the construction of major new projects for its Music, Business, and Athletic programs designed by leading architecture firms.

=== Academic buildings and lecture halls ===
Building	Image	Opened	Location	Notes
University Hall	University Hall from The Rock Entrance to University Hall	1869	1897 Sheridan Road	The oldest standing building on campus, which currently houses the English Department. University Hall was designed by architect Gurdon P. Randall in the Victorian Gothic style and is composed of Joliet limestone transported to Evanston by rail and barge via Lake Michigan. The interior was renovated in 1992 and it is now home to the American Studies and Science in Human Culture Programs (SHC).
Harris Hall	Harris Hall	1915	1881 Sheridan Road	Designed by Charles Coolidge in the neoclassical style with a series of ionic columns flanking the entrance, and adorned with the names of various social science fields. Today Harris Hall houses the History Department's classrooms and administration.
Annie May Swift Hall	Annie May Swift Hall	1895	1920 Campus Drive	Designed by Evanston architect Charles R. Ayers in a mixture of Venetian Gothic Revival and Romanesque styles with an ornate use of nonstructural decorative masonry. It was named for Annie May Swift, a Northwestern student and the daughter of notable Chicago meatpacking mogul Gustavus F. Swift, who donated the building in her honor following her death of typhoid. The building originally housed the School of Oratory, now the School of Communication's departments of Performance Studies and Radio/Television/Film.
Fisk Hall	Entrance to the McCormick Journalism Center at Fisk Hall	1899	1845 Sheridan Road	Designed by the firm of notable architect Daniel H. Burnham in the Romanesque Revival style. Contains the main classrooms for Medill School of Journalism and the Media Management Program for the Kellogg School of Management.
Lunt Hall	Lunt Hall	1894	2033 Sheridan Road	Designed by William Augustus Otis in the Italian Renaissance style. Originally housing Northwestern's Main academic library before the opening of Deering, the building still contains a mathematics library. Lunt houses the Mathematical Experience for Northwestern Undergraduates Program (MENU), and the Department of Mathematics.
Technological Institute	Aerial photograph of the Tech Institute, c. 1942-1950	1942	2145 Sheridan Road	Home to the Robert R. McCormick School of Engineering and Applied Science and the science departments of the Weinberg College of Arts and Sciences (Chemistry, Earth and Planetary Sciences, Physics and Astronomy). The Holabird & Root designed building was one of the largest buildings in the United States upon its completion. Construction of the building became possible after Walter Patton Murphy, a wealthy inventor of railroad equipment, donated $6.735 million in 1939. Murphy wanted the institute to offer a new kind of “cooperative education.” Various wings have been added to the Tech Institute since its inception, including the Center for Catalysis and Surface Science.
Kresge Hall	Kresge Centennial Hall	1955	1880 Campus Drive	A multipurpose academic building housing various academic departments, including the Department of Asian Languages and Cultures, Department of Art History, Department of Classics, and the Alice Kaplan Institute for the Humanities. Built in the 1950s with reserved gothic details, Kresge is the newest building in the oldest Evanston Campus quad surrounding The Rock.
Crowe Hall	Crowe Hall	2003	1860 Campus Drive	A later wing adjoining Kresge Hall, this building houses the African American Studies Department, Comparative Literary Studies Program, French and Italian Department, Latina and Latino Studies Program, Religious Studies Department, Spanish and Portuguese Department, and Crown Family Center for Jewish Studies.
Swift Hall	Swift Hall	1909	2029 Sheridan Road	Designed by George Maher in the early 20th-century, with various later art deco additions. Swift Hall is home to Northwestern's Program in Brain, Behavior, and Cognition (BBC), Cognitive Science Program, and the Department of Psychology.
Kellogg Global Hub	The Kellogg Global Hub	2017	2211 Campus Drive	A contemporary five-story, 415,000-square-foot facility with unobstructed views of Lake Michigan and a large curved glass facade. The flagship building of the Kellogg School of Management; designed by firm KPMB Architects with a layout "designed to encourage collaboration" among students of the prestigious graduate business program.
Donald P. Jacobs Center	Kellogg Donald P. Jacobs Center	1973	2001 Sheridan Road	Housed the Kellogg School of Management until its administration moved to the new Kellogg Global Hub. Currently unused. The 1973-built Jacobs Center sat on the recently vacated site of Northwestern's first building, Old College (designed by John M. Van Osdel), which was heavily damaged by lighting before its demolition after standing for 118 years. As of 2024, the Jacobs Center is undergoing a renovation converting it for use by the Weinberg College of Arts and Sciences, with the aim to create "a collaborative space to address pressing societal issues."
Ford Motor Company Engineering Design Center	Ford Engineering Design Center	2005	2133 Sheridan Road	Designed by Davis Brody Bond, a 63,000-square-foot, facility with classrooms, shops, design studios, meeting areas, and team-centered work rooms.
Walter Annenberg Hall	Annenberg Hall, SESP main building	1994	2120 Campus Drive	Designed by Booth Hansen Associates in a gothic-postmodern style. Annenberg Hall is home to the School of Education and Social Policy.
Frances Searle Building	Frances Searle Building	1972	2240 Campus Drive	Built on Northwestern's Lakefill, a brutalist building housing School of Communication classrooms.
McCormick Foundation Center	McCormick Foundation Center	2002	1870 Campus Drive	Contains the Medill School of Journalism's Integrated Marketing Communications Program (IMC).
Scott Hall		1940	601 University Place	One of a series of collegiate gothic buildings by James Gamble Rogers which houses event spaces and the offices of the Political Science Department.
Parkes Hall		1962	1870 Sheridan Road	A two-story building adjacent to the Alice Millar Chapel housing various classrooms and the offices of the Religious Studies Department.
James L. Allen Center		1972	2169 Campus Drive	Previously housed Kellogg School of Management lecture rooms, currently unused.
Locy Hall		1928	1850 Campus Drive	Houses various academic classrooms. Prior to 2010, Locy Hall was home to the Department of Earth and Planetary Science (previously Geological Sciences).
Chambers Hall		1999	600 Foster Street	A facility that houses the Northwestern University Transportation Center.
Family Institute		[?]	618 Library Place	A recent building housing the Center for Applied Psychological and Family Studies, as well as its namesake Family Institute, incorporated in 1969.

=== Libraries ===
Building	Image	Opened	Location	Notes
Charles Deering Library	Deering Library, corner spires Deering Library, West facade	1933	1937 Sheridan Road	Designed by James Gamble Rogers in the Collegiate Gothic style, at the top of Deering Meadow. The library's exterior is modeled after King's College Chapel at Cambridge University and features 68 unique stained glass windows by G. Owen Bonawit; many of which picture the shields of other universities or various academic disclipines. Houses the Northwestern University Archives, the Music Library, and the Art Collection and the Special Collections Department, with indoor connections to the larger University Library complex. The building's exterior underwent major renovation and restoration in 2013. As of 2024, the interior of Deering Library is closed for a refurbishment expected to conclude in September 2025.
University Library	Main (University) Library, North Tower Main (University) Library, East Tower	1970	1970 Campus Drive	Designed by brutalist architect Walter Netsch of Skidmore, Owings & Merrill, it today houses the main academic library system of Northwestern University, built to address Deering's limited size as its collection expanded in a period of postwar growth. University Library is the 14th-largest university library in North America, and is architecturally similar to other Netsch university projects in the Chicago area (including the Regenstein Library at the University of Chicago or UIC's University Hall). The complex consists of three structurally independent towers linked by multilevel elevated hallways.
Seeley G. Mudd Science and Engineering Library	Mudd Library	1977	2233 Tech Drive	Northwestern's third and most contemporary library building, dedicated to science and engineering. A major renovation of the building was completed in 1999. The library was expanded again in 2017, a project which included such amenities as "collaboration rooms" and showers in renovated study areas.

=== Performing arts ===
Building	Image	Opened	Location	Notes
Patrick G. and Shirley W. Ryan Center for the Musical Arts	Main building of the Bienen School of Music	2016	70 Arts Circle Drive	Designed by firm Goettsch Partners; home to the Bienen School of Music and the School of Communication. The Ryan Center sits on the Lakefill and has an angled glass facade providing views of Lake Michigan and Chicago's skyline.
Mary and Leigh Block Museum of Art	The renovated Block Museum of Art	1980	40 Arts Circle Drive	Houses the Block Museum of Art, an art gallery run by the university. Re-opened in 2000 after a renovation designed by Dirk Lohan.
Cahn Auditorium	Entrance to Cahn Auditorium from Emerson Street	1940	600 Emerson Street	1000-seat auditorium designed by James Gamble Rogers; equipped with an orchestra pit and suitable for musical theatre productions, operas, concerts, speeches, convocation ceremonies and other large-scale events.
Music Administration Building	The former administration building of the Evanston College for Ladies, later occupied by the Bienen School of Music	1874	711 Elgin Road	A 19th-century building, designed by Gurdon P. Randall, originally serving as the headquarters of the Willard Women's College before its eventual merger with Northwestern. It then housed the School of Music for over 70 years, seeing little modification. The building was vacated in 2015 following the opening of the new Ryan Center for the Musical Arts and is currently unused.
Pick-Staiger Concert Hall	The Pick-Staiger Concert Hall	1975	50 Arts Circle Drive	Built upon the then-new Northwestern Lakefill and Designed by Edward D. Dart of Loebl, Schlossman, Dart & Hackl.
Lutkin Memorial Hall	Lutkin Hall from University Place	1941	700 University Place	Designed by James Gamble Rogers in a simplified gothic revival style with a decorative steepled cupola. Contains a 400-seat auditorium used by the Bienen School of Music among other departments.
Regenstein Hall of Music	Regenstein Hall on the Northwestern University Lakefill	1977	60 Arts Circle Drive	Designed by Walter Netsch of Skidmore, Owings & Merrill. It is home to a 200-seat master-class lecture hall, musical practice facilities, and teaching studios.
Virginia Wadsworth Wirtz Center for the Performing Arts	Wirtz Center for the Performing Arts	1980	1949 Campus Drive; 10-30 Arts Circle Drive	Contemporary building comprising a theater, a green room, a dressing room, classroom and meeting spaces, and rehearsal studios. Home to the Department of Theatre and Dance's MFA in Acting program.
John J. Louis Hall		1991	1877 Campus Drive	A Lakefill structure housing multimedia spaces and classrooms for the Department of Radio/Television/Film and the WNUR-FM radio station.
Marjorie Ward Marshall Dance Center		1983	10 Arts Circle Drive	A modern, $1,000,000 performance venue donated by filmmaker Garry Marshall in honor of his mother, Marjorie Ward Marshall.
Shanley Hall		1943	2031 Sheridan Road	Small, nondescript one-story building constructed and opened in 1943 as classrooms for the Navy College Training Program. It remained a classroom building for the military until the end of World War II in 1945, and has served as a venue for student-directed theatrical productions and dance performances since.
Music Practice Hall		1915	1823 Sherman Avenue	Original School of Music practice hall Nicknamed "The Beehive." The building was the first use of a soundproof door in a music venue.
Brentano Hall		[?]	1818 Hinman Avenue	Converted residential property that now houses a music academy for surrounding communities.

=== Science and research buildings ===
Building	Image	Opened	Location	Notes
Dearborn Observatory	The Dearborn Observatory	1889	2131 Tech Drive	Designed by Cobb and Frost in the Richardsonian Romanesque style and home to the Dearborn 18 and 1/2 inch refractor, which was once the largest telescope in the United States. The building was moved in 1939 to make room for the Technological Institute, an effort which took 26 men three months. The observatory is still used by the Department of Physics and Astronomy.
Hogan Biological Sciences Building	Hogan Biological Sciences Building, West facade	1967	2205 Tech Drive	Midcentury brutalist building housing the offices and laboratories of the Program in Biological Sciences, Center for Reproductive Science, Institute for Neuroscience, Neurobiology and Physiology, Interdisciplinary Biological Sciences Graduate Program (IBiS), Neurobiology and Physiology, Plant Biology and Conservation Program (PBC), Argonne Institute of Science and Engineering (NAISE), and Center for Water Research.
Patrick G. and Shirley W. Ryan Hall	Patrick G. and Shirley W. Ryan Hall	2006	2190 Campus Drive	Designed by architects Zimmer, Gunsul, and Frasca. An 84,000-square-foot building for the Center for Nanofabrication and Molecular Self-Assembly.
Center for Catalysis and Surface Science		1984	2137 Tech Drive	Houses the Center for Intelligent Processing of Composites (IPC) laboratories.
Cook Hall		1992	2220 Campus Drive	A facility named Cook Hall, in 2001, for William A. "Bill" Cook and his wife Gayle. Home to Molecular Biosciences, the Keck Biophysics Facility, and the departments of Materials Science and Engineering, and Neurobiology and Physiology.
The Garage	Interior of "The Garage"	2015	2311 N Campus Drive	A cross-disciplinary site within a parking garage for students to develop start-up companies.
Pancoe-NSUHS Life Sciences Pavilion		2003	2200 Campus Drive	A 88,000 sq ft (8,200 m^{2}) research building that includes research laboratories, faculty offices, a vivarium, auditorium and cafe.
Richard and Barbara Silverman Hall for Molecular Therapeutics and Diagnostics	Silverman Hall from the adjacent parking lot	2010	2170 Campus Drive	Modern facility housing the Chemistry of Life Processes Institute, Center for Molecular Innovation and Drug Discovery, and Physical Science-Oncology Center (PSOC).
CRESAP Laboratory		1949	2021 Sheridan Road	A laboratory facility built originally to house the Department of Zoology as an adjacent wing of Swift Hall.

=== Religious buildings ===
Building	Image	Opened	Location	Notes
Garrett Evangelical Theological Seminary	Garrett Evangelical Theological Seminary	1924	2121 Sheridan Road	Designed in the gothic revival style with a 6-story central tower; houses the offices and classrooms of Garrett Evangelical Theological Seminary, a private seminary and graduate school of theology on Northwestern's campus.
Alice Millar Chapel and Religious Center	Alice Millar Chapel facade facing Sheridan Road, University Hall and the Weber Arch	1962	1870 Sheridan Road	The newest of the strictly gothic revival constructions on Northwestern's campus, home to a 100-rank Aeolian-Skinner organ, stained-glass windows, and a 151-foot (46 m) spire. The interior of Alice Millar Chapel is connected to the classrooms of Parkes Hall.
Levere Memorial Temple	Levere Memorial Temple	1930	1856 Sheridan Road	Gothic revival temple featuring stained glass windows by Louis Comfort Tiffany. Built to act as a war memorial and serve as the headquarters and administrative facility of the Sigma Alpha Epsilon fraternal organization.
Canterbury House		[?]	2010 Orrington	A converted residential property containing the Episcopal Campus Ministry.
Fiedler Hillel Center		2020	629 Foster Street	A modernized version of an existing building, now housing Northwestern Hillel, a national campus Jewish student organization. The project was delayed until the end of 2020 due to the COVID-19 pandemic, but has since been completed.
Lutheran Center		[?]	2204 Orrington Ave	A converted residential property containing Northwestern's Lutheran Center.
Sheil Catholic Center		[?]	2110 Sheridan Road	Contemporary building housing Northwestern's Catholic Center.
University Christian Ministry		[?]	1834 Chicago Avenue	A converted residential property housing the administration of the campus University Christian Ministry.

=== Athletic buildings ===
Building	Image	Opened	Location	Notes
Ryan Field	Ryan Field, c. 2007 Ryan Field, c. 1930-1945	1926	1501 Central Street	Home of Northwestern Football, formerly named Dyche Stadium. Originally designed by James Gamble Rogers in a signature collegiate gothic style. The original structure's demolition has begun as of January 2024. This will make way for an unprecedentedly modern college football stadium. The new stadium was opposed by many neighborhood residents for noise and traffic concerns but was approved by Evanston City Council in November 2023. The university is moving forward on completely redeveloping the original structure and surrounding athletics campus and states it aims to "address the deficiencies of the current stadium," aiming to improve efficiency while simultaneously reducing its overall capacity.
Welsh-Ryan Arena	The exterior of Welsh-Ryan Arena	1952	2705 Ashland Avenue	Northwestern University's home for men's basketball, women's basketball, women's volleyball, and wrestling. The 7,039-seat multi-purpose arena underwent a 110-million dollar renovation in 2018, and is now "believed to be the most ADA accessible anywhere in college athletics."
Patten Gymnasium	The current Patten Gymnasium The former Patten Gymnasium, c. 1930	1940	2407 Sheridan Road	Original fitness center, which once housed multipurpose courts and weight room but is now a state-of-the-art golf practice center. The collegiate gothic structure, a 1940 successor to the previous, architecturally-notable Prairie School Patten Gymnasium (which sat on land now occupied by the Technological Institute), maintains the original statues placed at its entrance: sculptures titled "Physical Development" and "Intellectual Development" (nicknamed "Pat and Jim") by artist Hermon Atkins MacNeil.
Walter Athletics Center		2018	2255 Campus Drive	A massive, 420,000-square-foot indoor, cantilevered football practice field designed by Perkins&Will. Includes floor to ceiling glass walls overlooking Lake Michigan. The $270 million facility also includes a strength and conditioning center, with meeting rooms and a technologically assisted sport performance center.
Henry Crown Sports Pavilion and Norris Aquatic Center	"SPAC," prior to renovation	1987	2311 Campus Drive	"SPAC," the largest fitness and recreation center open to non-athlete Northwestern students. Contains courts for basketball, volleyball, and racquet sports, and a sizable swimming and diving pool. Also includes the adjacent indoor Combe Tennis Center, physical therapy, and other treatment facilities.
Blomquist Recreation Center		1963	617 Foster Street	Smaller facility with exercise equipment and multipurpose courts for use by undergraduate students at the South of Northwestern's campus.
Trienens Hall		1996	2707 Ashland Avenue	A fieldhouse with three practice courts, adjacent to Welsh-Ryan Arena. A renovation was completed in 2018 to modernize the facility, which included a name change to "Trienens Performance Center."
Anderson Hall		2005	2701 Ashland Avenue	Modern building in the vicinity of Ryan Field, designed by architects Nagle, Hartray, Danker, McKay, and Penney. Houses athletic offices and academic advising for student athletes.
Lanny and Sharon Martin Stadium		2016	2235 Campus Drive	Lakefront stadium home to Northwestern's lacrosse and soccer teams.
Byron S. Coon Sports Center		1963	2707 Ashland Avenue	A modest football practice facility, adjacent to Ryan Field.
Sailing Center		2014	1823 Campus Drive	A 5,000 sq ft (460 m^{2}) sailing facility overlooking Lake Michigan, open from early May to late October at Northwestern's South Beach.

=== Administrative and other student buildings ===
Building	Image	Opened	Location	Notes
Norris University Center	(Left) Norris University Center across from The Lagoon	1972	1999 Campus Drive	Northwestern's student union building named for named for Lester J. Norris, an alumnus of Northwestern University who died in 1967. Norris University Center is a hub for many student-run activities and amenities and also houses various dining options. Designed in the brutalist style by Edward D. Dart as one of the earliest buildings to be constructed on the university's Lakefill Campus.
Segal Visitors Center		2014	1841 Sheridan Road	A contemporary, state-of-the-art, glass and stone visitors center. The structure, which overlooks Lake Michigan from the southernmost point of Northwestern University's lakefront property, was designed by architecture firm Perkins&Will. Segal is named for alumni Gordon and Carole Segal, and features a large parking ramp on its upper levels with space for over 400 cars.
Rebecca Crown Center	The Rebecca Crown Center	1968	633 Clark Street	Houses various administrative offices as well as the main offices of The Graduate School. The structure comprises a raised courtyard, clocktower, and various office wings with a unique facade clad in protruding rectangular panels. Designed by Walter Netsch of Skidmore, Owings & Merrill.
Central Utility Plant		1964	2026 Campus Drive	The main utility plant of the Evanston campus, where water is cooled and heated until it becomes high-pressured steam that can be piped throughout campus for heating its buildings. In 2009 the Central Utility Plant's chilled water facility was expanded approximately 100 feet to the south to accommodate two new 5000 ton chillers.
John Evans Alumni Center		1880	1800 Sheridan Road	Originally a High Victorian Gothic manor designed by L.D. Norton on the university's original property administered Dr. John Evans, one of the nine founders of Northwestern (a bust of Evans is currently displayed in the center's living room). In the early-1900s, the house was purchased by Rufus Dawes and remodeled into the Tudor style, with the turret shape being reconfigured and entrance moved from Sheridan Road to Clark Street. The property, fronting Evanston's Centennial Park, was acquired by Northwestern University in 1943 and now houses its main alumni relations center.
Old Roycemore School Building	The southwest corner of the Roycemore School Building from Orrington Avenue and Colfax Street	1915	640 Lincoln Street	Originally constructed for the Roycemore School, an Evanston-based K-12 preparatory school, before its relocation to a larger facility in 2012. The series of adjoined buildings were designed by architect Lawrence Buck and the firm of Talmadge & Watson in the Arts and Crafts style with Prairie School influence. They were purchased by Northwestern and are zoned for the university's intended use of the buildings as dormitories or expanded classroom space, however plans to utilize the property were heavily opposed by nearby residents, citing noise complaints. The now vacant structure is listed on the National Register of Historic Places.
The Black House	Facade of The Black House, as seen from Sheridan Road	[?]	1913 Sheridan Road	Houses the Black House, the Black Student Union (BLU) of Northwestern University, an organization originally created in the fall of 1968 as part of the institution's agreement with students to end the Bursar's Office takeover in April of that year. The house is one of multiple formerly private residences along Sheridan Road purchased by the university during its expansion. It designed in the Queen Anne style, includes programming rooms, a prayer space, and computer lab available to students, and was renovated to be fully ADA-compliant.
Multicultural Center		[?]	1936 Sheridan Road	Houses Northwestern's Multicultural Center, established in 1999 as the result of advocacy from an increasingly diverse student body. One of multiple formerly private residences along Sheridan Road purchased by the university during its expansion. The house itself is designed in a rare symmetrical Victorian style, and contains various murals and student artworks, private social and study rooms, a prayer space, and a computer lab available to students.
Women's Center		[?]	2000 Sheridan Road	The Women's Center is a social justice, feminist, and educational outreach organization created in 1986 to promote gender equity and inclusion at Northwestern to serve the needs of women and LGBT+ people on the Evanston campus. One of multiple formerly private residences along Sheridan Road purchased by the university during its expansion. The two-story house is designed in the Tudor Revival style and houses the center's offices as well as areas for education and social events in its casual environment.
Searle Hall Student Health Services Center		1962	633 Emerson Street	A modernist building originally constructed as the Student Health Facility and Infirmary, currently houses Student Health Services (NUHS) as well as portions of the Counseling and Psychological Services (CAPS) and sexual health resources available to Northwestern students. Renovated in 2010 with additional procedure rooms and a modified layout.

=== Other buildings ===
Listed alphabetically by address

- 1808 Chicago Avenue
- 1810-12 Chicago Avenue, department of anthropology, department of sociology
- 1815 Chicago Avenue
- 405 Church Street, College Preparation Program
- 515 Clark Street
- 555 Clark Street, Cook Family Writing Program, Mathematical Methods in the Social Sciences Program, Center for the Writing Arts, various student financial offices
- 619 Clark Street, various financial offices
- 625 Colfax Street, Center for Talent Development
- 629 Colfax Street, Office of Global Safety and Security
- 617 Dartmouth Place, Center for Talent Development
- 627 Dartmouth Place, Searle Center for Advancing Learning and Teaching
- 630 Dartmouth Place, International Office
- 1201 Davis Street, various alumni and development offices, University Police
- 619 Emerson Street, Holocaust Educational Foundation, Office of Undergraduate Studies and Advising
- 633 Emerson Street, Student Health Services
- 618 Garrett Place, Master of Science in Education (MSEd)
- 625 Haven Street
- 617 Haven Street, Naval ROTC
- 600 Haven Street, New Student and Family Programs (NSFP)
- 1801 Hinman Avenue, Undergraduate Admissions and Financial Aid, Veterans Office
- 1810 Hinman Avenue, Department of Anthropology
- 1812 Hinman Avenue
- 1813 Hinman Avenue, Center for Civic Engagement, Center for Leadership, Chicago Field Studies Program (CFS)
- 1819 Hinman Avenue, Program of Asian American Studies
- 1835 Hinman Avenue, Dining hall
- 617 Library Place, Writing Place
- 618 Library Place, Center for Applied Psychological and Family Studies, The Family Institute
- 620 Library Place, Program of African Studies, Institute for the Study of Islamic Thought in Africa (ISITA)
- 626 Library Place
- 620 Lincoln Street, Legal Studies Program
- 630 Lincoln Street, Northwestern Career Advancement and SafeRide
- 640 Lincoln Street, Art Theory and Practice Department
- 1801 Maple Avenue, Media Management Center (MMC), NU in Qatar Support Office, Traffic Safety School
- 616 Noyes Street, Integrated Science Program (ISP)
- 617 Noyes Street, National High School Institute
- 625 Noyes Street, Center for Talent Development
- 629 Noyes Street, Northwestern University Press
- 1840 Oak Ave, Osher Lifelong Learning Institute
- 1603 Orrington Ave, Office of Compliance, Audit and Advisory Service
- 2020 Ridge Avenue, various administrative offices
- 1902 Sheridan Road, Equality Development and Globalization Studies (EDGS), Roberta Buffett Institute for Global Studies, Center for International and Comparative Studies, Center for Technology Innovation Management
- 1908 Sheridan Road, Office of Undergraduate Studies and Advising
- 1914 Sheridan Road, African American Student Affairs
- 1918 Sheridan Road, Dean's Office for the Weinberg College of Arts and Sciences
- 1922 Sheridan Road, Office of Undergraduate Studies and Advising
- 1936 Sheridan Road, Multicultural Center, Multicultural Student Affairs, University Academic Advisory Center, Asian/Asian American Student Affairs
- 1940 Sheridan Road, Office of Fellowships & the University Academic Advising Center (UAAC)
- 2000 Sheridan Road
- 2006 Sheridan Road, Statistics Department
- 2010 Sheridan Road, Programs for Asian Studies, International Studies, International and Area Studies, and Latin American and Caribbean Studies, and the Harvey Kapnick Center for Business Institutions
- 2016 Sheridan Road, Department of Linguistics
- 2040 Sheridan Road, Institute for Policy Research
- 2046 Sheridan Road
- 2122 Sheridan Road, various residential services
- 1800 Sherman Avenue, Innovation and New Ventures Office (INVO), Art History Department, Gender and Sexuality Studies, Department of German, Global Health Studies Program, Middle East and North African Studies (MENA), Slavic Languages and Literatures (purchased by Northwestern in 2004)
- 720 University Place, Human Resources Department, Payroll

== Chicago campus ==
Northwestern's Downtown Chicago campus of approximately 25 acres (100,000 m^{2}) dates to 1921 where the university purchased 9 original acres for its medical, dental, law, and business schools. The Chicago Campus, with a small assortment of gothic revival buildings, is notable for containing the first instances of academic skyscrapers in the world. Located on land in the Streeterville neighborhood on the city's Near North Side, the secondary campus is home to the Feinberg School of Medicine and Northwestern University School of Law (as well as parts of the Kellogg School of Management and School of Continuing Studies).

=== Pritzker School of Law ===
Building	Image	Opened	Location	Notes
Abbott Hall	Postcard of Abbott Hall	1940	710 N. Lake Shore Drive	Houses various administrative services for the School of Law. Abbott Hall served as a Naval Reserve Midshipman's School during the World War II era and operated as a student dormitory in a period following 1945. When built at a cost of $1.75 million to house more than 800 residents, the 20-story building was then believed to be the tallest structure in the world used exclusively as a college dormitory.
Levy Mayer Hall		1927	357 E. Chicago Avenue	The smallest of three original James Gamble Rogers buildings constructed for the Northwestern's new Chicago campus in the Collegiate Gothic style. The structure consists of a series of collegiate gothic classrooms surrounding an internal courtyard landscaped with grass, trees, shrubbery and ivy. Houses the Bluhm Legal Clinic, Master of Science in Law Program (MSL), Pritzker Legal Research Center, Registrar.
Robert McCormick Hall	Law School entrance to McCormick Hall	1959	350 E. Superior Street	A three-story, L-shaped gothic building named for Colonel McCormick, a member of Northwestern's Class of 1907 and the famed editor and publisher of the Chicago Tribune. Along with law classrooms, houses the Office of Student Services for the Chicago campus.
Arthur Rubloff Building	Aerial view of Northwestern Law's Rubloff building	1984	375 E. Chicago Avenue	Houses the Bluhm Legal Clinic, Office of Admissions, Pritzker Legal Research Center, and Thorne Auditorium. The modernist lakefront tower adjoins James Gamble Rogers's Levy Mayer Hall and sits immediately west of Lake Shore Drive.

=== Kellogg School of Management ===
Building	Image	Opened	Location	Notes
Wieboldt Hall		1926	340 E. Superior Street	Designed by James Gamble Rogers in the Gothic Revival-style as one of the original buildings at Northwestern's streeterville campus. The 7-story building was given Landmark Status by the Chicago City Council in 2014 for representing "significant examples of work by a nationally prominent architect." Wiedboldt Hall was named for William Wieboldt, the wealthy owner of a chain of department stores operating out of Sheboygan and Chicago's Northwest Side in Wicker Park and is today home to the Chicago facilities of the Kellogg School of Management and the School of Continuing Studies.

=== Feinberg School of Medicine ===
==== Patient care and research ====
Building	Image	Opened	Location	Notes
Ward Memorial Building	Ward Building at the Northwestern University Feinberg School of Medicine	1926	303 E. Chicago Avenue	A prominent skyscraper and the largest of three buildings designed for the Chicago campus by James Gamble Rogers in the Gothic Revival-style. The Ward Memorial Building, named for the famous national department store enterprise of its namesake Chicago salesman Aaron Montgomery Ward, was the first "academic skyscraper" to ever have been constructed by a university. Alongside other Gamble Rogers buildings at the Chicago campus, the 20-story Ward Building was given Landmark Status by the Chicago City Council in 2014 for its unique style amongst other skyscrapers and relevant historical significance. It houses comprehensive medical education facilities and in 2019 opened the Simpson Querrey Biomedical Research Center.
Robert H. Lurie Medical Research Center		2005	303 E. Superior Street	12-story building with research labs and an auditorium. The medical research center is part of a major donation from the Ann and Robert H. Lurie Foundation.
Searle Medical Research Building		1965	320 E. Superior Street	A mid-century modernist tower housing the departments of Nephrology/Hypertension, Pediatrics, Pharmacology, and Neuroscience, the School of Medicine's Interdepartmental Neuroscience Program (NUIN), and its Center for Microbiology-Immunology and academic press. Alongside multiple buildings on Northwestern's Evanston Campus, the Searle Medical Research Building is named for Francis Searle.
Morton Medical Research Building		1955	310 E. Superior Street	A more contemporary Gothic Revival skyscraper with modernist elements adjacent to the Ward Memorial Building. Houses the Feinberg School of Medicine's Medical Scientist Training Program (MSTP) and the Department of Physiology.
Tarry Building		1990	300 E. Superior Street	17-story building with additional research and education space for basic science, clinical research, teaching, and support services.

==== Buildings of the associated Northwestern Memorial Hospital, Ann & Robert H. Lurie Children's Hospital of Chicago, and the Rehabilitation Institute of Chicago (RIC)* ====
 Listed alphabetically by address. These buildings are not considered parts of Northwestern's academic campus but are associated with the Feinberg School of Medicine and Northwestern Medical System.
- 225 E. Chicago Avenue, (Ann & Robert H.) Lurie Children's Hospital of Chicago
- 250 E. Erie Street, Adult Emergency Department
- 251 E. Erie Street, Feinberg Pavilion
- 441 E. Erie Street, Rehabilitation Institute of Chicago Onterie Center Offices
- 710 N. Fairbanks Court, Walter E. Olson Pavilion
- 211 E. Grand Avenue, Ronald McDonald House
- 201 E. Huron Street, Galter Pavilion
- 345 E. Huron Street, Stone Institute Inpatient Psychiatry Center
- 446 E. Ontario Street, Stone Institute
- 244 E. Pearson Street, Worcester House
- 676 N. St. Clair Street, Arkes Pavilion
- 250 E. Superior Street, Prentice Women's Hospital
- 345 E. Superior Street, Flagship Main Entrance

== See also ==
- Northwestern University
- History of Northwestern University
- Architecture of Chicago
- List of Northwestern University Residences
- Northwestern University Library
- Deering Library
