= The Waa-Mu Show =

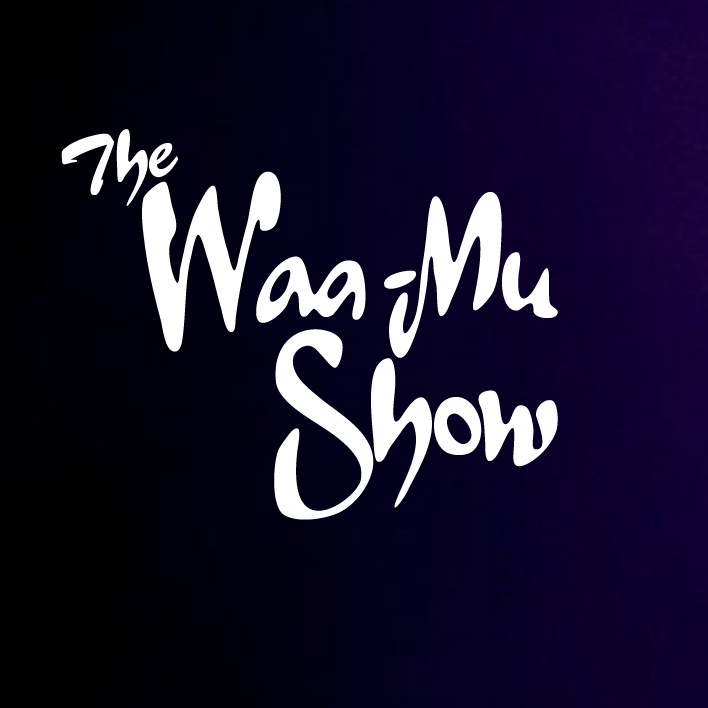
- Formation: 1929; 96 years ago
- Type: Non-profit 501(c)(3)
- Purpose: Musical theatre
- Location: Northwestern University, Evanston, Illinois
- Affiliations: Virginia Wadsworth Wirtz Center for the Performing Arts
- Website: waamushow.org

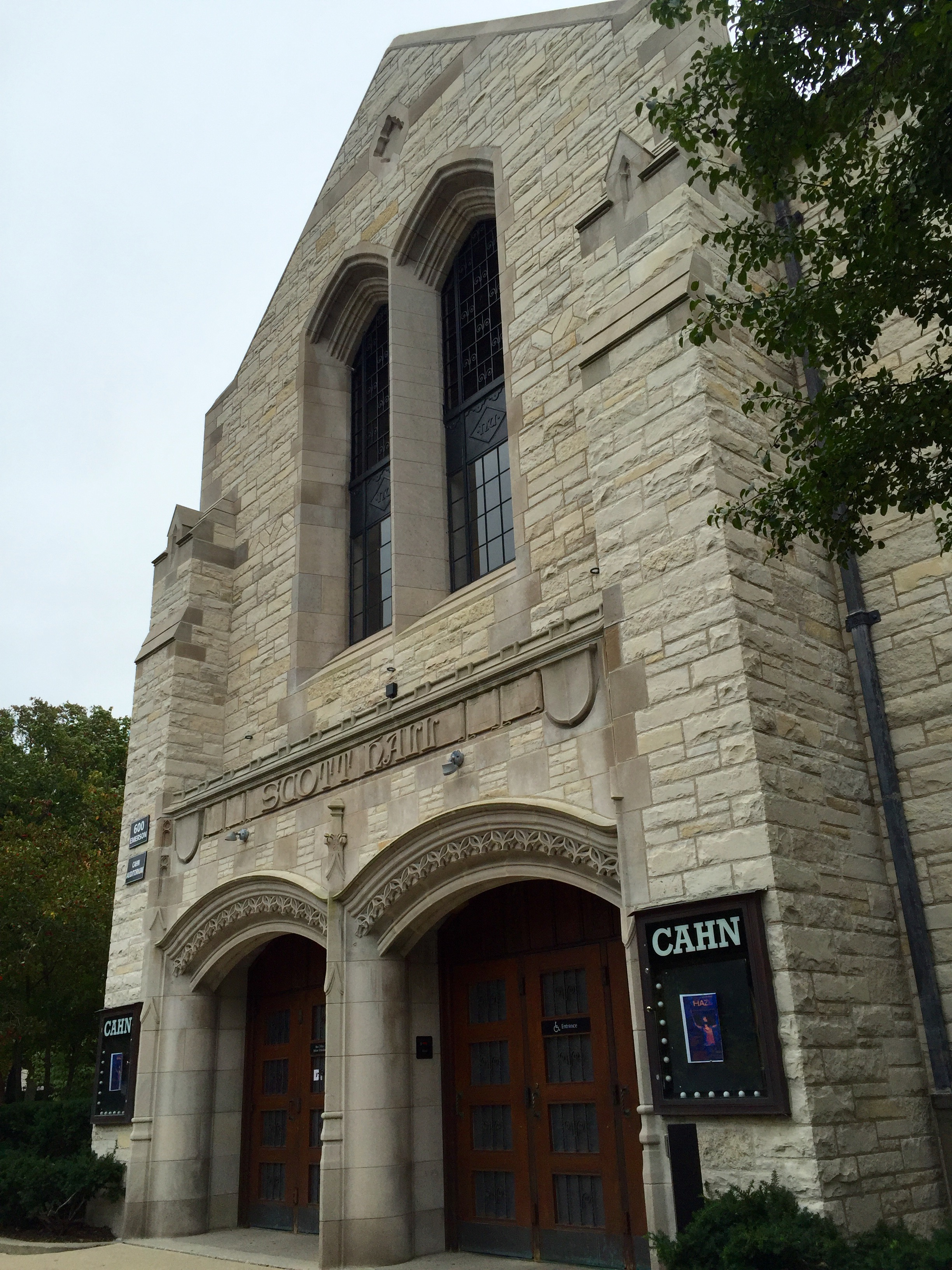
The Waa-Mu Show is held in Cahn Auditorium at Northwestern University

The Waa-Mu Show; /wɒˈmuː/ wah-mew; is a nonprofit 501(c)(3) organization at Northwestern University that produces student written, orchestrated, produced, and performed original musical theatre work every year. The song lyrics, script, and music are developed in a series of classes. It is Northwestern's longest-standing theatrical tradition and is held on campus in Cahn Auditorium. This tradition began as a musical revue, showcasing several different student-written Northwestern-inspired vignettes connected by a single theme. By 2013, the Waa-Mu show evolved into an original full-length musical.

== History ==
The first Waa-Mu show took place in 1929. A senior Northwestern student, Joseph W. Miller, and his classmate Darrell Ware wrote the script for and staged the college musical comedy that became "The Waa-Mu Show", the first co-educational college musical show. The Women's Athletic Association (WAA) and the Men's Union (MU) collaborated to put it on. "Waa-Mu" is a synthesis of the two groups' acronyms.

The WAA had been staging popular all-female musical comedies since 1912; the MU had presented less successful all-male comic operas for several years before 1929. Both men's and women's shows had been losing money and Miller and Ware raised $1,200 by borrowing $5 apiece from interested students to finance the first show. It also was Miller's and Ware's idea to feature both men and women in the production. At first, the WAA was reluctant to share the stage with the MU, but they eventually agreed. The premiere show was Good Morning Glory. The Daily Northwestern wrote, "Campus interest is the highest yet for any single dramatic activity in University history." This review prompted the producers to begin formulating and writing the next year's show. Walter Kerr was the principal writer of the 1936 musical revue, It Goes to Show. Kerr graduated the next year and became a theatre critic for the New York Times. After graduating in 1929, Miller stayed at Northwestern to do graduate work in personnel administration. Ware went to Hollywood to write screenplays. In 1931 Northwestern president Walter Dill Scott offered Miller a position on the university's staff as Freshman Advisor and Waa-Mu Director.

In 1938, Waa-Mu board members were displeased by that year's student-written script. Instead, they staged George Gershwin's musical Of Thee I Sing, about a presidential candidate who promises to bring more love to the White House. Actor Tony Randall (then known as Leonard Rosenberg) portrayed a boisterous Texas congressman in the production. Only three times in Waa-Mu's history has non-original material been presented; in 1935 with Ray Henderson's musical Good News, in 1938 with George Gershwin's musical Of Thee I Sing, and in 1993 with Leonard Bernstein's musical On the Town.

Waa-Mu went on hiatus during World War II and relaunched in 1946. During the three-year break, profits from previous Waa-Mu productions were invested in war bonds. Miller directed the Waa-Mu Show until 1975; his last show was Quick Change. He retired on August 31, 1975, and died in 1979. Tom Roland succeeded Miller as director. Occasionally, Waa-Mu has been performed off-campus. The show traveled to Chicago several times after its Evanston run, most notably in 1931 (at the Civic Theatre in Chicago) and 1933. Orchestra leader Fred Waring played original Waa-Mu songs on the radio in 1951.

Waa-Mu performances have been presented at Cahn Auditorium since its 1941 production, Wait A Minute, premiering on the new stage the same year Scott Hall was completed. Before performances began in Cahn Auditorium, Waa-Mu productions were held at and around the Evanston area, at the New Evanston Theatre and the National College of Education.

== People ==
=== The 92nd Annual Waa-Mu Show: Romance En Route ===
- Director: Johanna McKenzie Miller
- Co-Chairs: Daniel Maton, Madeline Oberle, Mitchell Huntley, Francis Brenner
- Writing Coordinators: Lena Moore, Kailey Morand, Reva Sangal
- Music Directors: Wes D’Alelio, Oliver Paddock
- Choreographer: Ashley Valent

=== The 91st Annual Waa-Mu Show: A Peculiar Inheritance ===
- Director: Johanna McKenzie Miller
- Music Supervisor: Ryan T. Nelson
- Co-Chairs: Daniel Maton, Madeline Oberle
- Writing Coordinators: Trevor K. Band, Mitchell Huntley, Jared Son, Francesca Wimer
- Music Directors: Cameron Miya, Samuel Perlman
- Choreographers: Emily Brooks, Alex Angrist, Amanda de la Fuente

=== The 90th Annual Waa-Mu Show: The Secret of Camp Elliott ===
- Director: Amanda Tanguay
- Music Supervisor: Ryan T. Nelson
- Co-Chairs: Jessica Nekritz, Annie Beaubien, Pallas Gutierrez
- Writing Coordinators: Brandon Acosta, Sarah Geltz, Alex Manaa, Bennett Petersen
- Music Directors: Ezri Killeen, Ben Roberts

=== The 89th Annual Waa-Mu Show: State of the Art ===
- Director: Amanda Tanguay
- Music Supervisor: Ryan T. Nelson
- Co-Chairs: Leo Jared Scheck, Emma Griffone, Olivia Worley, Jonathan Toussaint
- Writing Coordinators: Ruchir Khazanchi, Emmet Smith, Matthew Threadgill, Mikey Walden
- Music Directors: Mason Frasher, Saoirse Lee

=== The 88th Annual Waa-Mu Show: For the Record ===
- Director: Stephen Schellhardt
- Music Supervisor: Ryan T. Nelson
- Co-Chairs: Gabriella Green, Ziare Paul-Emile, Alexander Rothfield, Lindsay Whisler
- Writing Coordinators: Lauren Katz and Carly Mazer
- Music Directors: Sam Groisser, Tynan Friend, Saoirse Lee, Abe Oxley-Hase, Will Finnegan, Mo Yeh
- Associate Director/Choreographer: Amanda Tanguay
- Choreographers: Olivia Whitmer, Sophie Civetta

=== The 87th Annual Waa-Mu Show: Manhattan Miracle ===
- Director: Stephen Schellhardt
- Music Supervisor: Ryan T. Nelson
- Co-Chairs: Kaja Burke Williams, Maxwell Beer, Sarah Ohlson, and Andrew Restieri
- Head Writers: Alex Rothfield, Jordan Knitzer, and Alec Steinhorn

=== The 86th Annual Waa-Mu Show: Beyond Belief ===
- Director: David H. Bell
- Music Supervisor: Ryan T. Nelson
- Co-Chairs: Jessie Jennison, Charlotte Morris, Justin Tepper, and Eric Peters
- Head Writers: Maxwell Beer, Carrie Caffrey, and Alexander Rothfield

=== The 85th Annual Waa-Mu Show: Another Way West ===
- Director: David H. Bell
- Music Supervisor: Ryan T. Nelson
- Co-Chairs: Elizabeth Romero, Fergus Inder, Charlie Oh, and Myrna Conn
- Head Writers: Maxwell Beer, Casey Kendall, and Jon Bauerfeld

=== The 84th Annual Waa-Mu Show: Gold ===
- Director: David H. Bell
- Music Supervisor: Ryan T. Nelson
- Co-Chairs: Max Rein, Kylie Mullins, and Hannah Dunn
- Head Writers: Jon Bauerfeld, Charlie Oh, and Myrna Conn

=== Previous Directors ===
- 1929–1975: Directed by Joe W. Miller
- 1976–1990: Directed by Tom Roland
- 1991–1993: Co-Directed by Tom Roland and Dominic Missimi
- 1994–2010: Directed by Dominic Missimi
- 2011–2017: Directed by David H. Bell
- 2018–2019: Directed by Stephen Schellhardt
- 2020-2021: Directed by Amanda Tanguay

=== Notable alumni ===
- Claude Akins
- Warren Beatty
- Karen Black
- Jeff Blumenkrantz
- Zach Braff
- Nancy Dussault
- Gregg Edelman
- Penny Fuller
- George Furth
- Frank Galati
- Ana Gasteyer
- Larry Grossman
- Charlton Heston
- Laura Innes
- Brian d'Arcy James
- Cloris Leachman
- Shelley Long
- Paul Lynde
- Garry Marshall
- Jenny Powers
- Tony Randall
- Charlotte Rae
- Ann-Margret
- Tony Roberts
- Kate Shindle
- Sheldon Harnick
- Billy Eichner
- Cody Sweet
- Alan Schmuckler
- Michael Mahler
- Ian Weinberger

== Organization ==
Several different positions and sub-groups with distinct responsibilities ease the process of creating an original musical each year. They include:

Program Head: A staff member of the Theatre & Interpretation Center who leads the creation process and makes all final decisions. The Program Head is typically the director of the production as well.

Co-Chairs: The student leaders of the organization who work alongside the Program Head to make creative and administrative decisions.

Writing Coordinators: The student leaders in charge of generating and combining material to form a cohesive script for the show.

Executive Board: A group of students who work under the Co-Chairs to handle administrative, financial, and organizational needs.

Creating the Musical Class: A large group of students enrolled in a winter class who generate material, including the script, songs, and lyrics.

Orchestrating the Musical Class: A group of students enrolled in a winter class who make orchestrations; many go on to join Team Music.

Team Music: A group of students led by the Music Director that orchestrates the songs generated in the Creating the Musical class as well as the incidental music and overture.

=== The Secret of Camp Elliott ===
The Secret Of Camp Elliott premiered digitally in June 2021.

=== State of the Art ===
State of the Art was originally set to open on May 1, 2020. On March 13, the co-chairs decided to cancel the final reading of the show before it was set to go into rehearsal due to concerns over the COVID-19 pandemic. The university suspended In-person classes, and it became clear that a performance as usual in Cahn Auditorium would not be possible. The team quickly pivoted to online rehearsals and decided to have an online presentation. State of the Art became the first new musical to be presented live over Zoom to an international audience. Tony Award-winning Broadway producer Ken Davenport featured an article by the co-chairs on his blog, and Larson Award winner Ryan Cunningham also wrote an article about the process.

=== For the Record ===
The 2019 production followed a female Chicago journalist embarking on a project to create obituaries for history’s most incredible women, including mathematician and cryptanalyst Gene Grabeel, French swordswoman and opera singer Julie d’Aubigny, and early civil rights leader Ida B. Wells. Inspired by the real life Overlooked (obituary feature), initiated by Amy Padnani at the New York Times.

=== Another Way West ===
The 2016 performance was Another Way West. It follows a female researcher, accompanied by her nieces and nephews, on the Oregon Trail searching for her late ancestor. This show merges the journeys of both the researcher and her ancestor on the Oregon Trail.

=== Gold ===
In 2015, the students put on Gold, based on the 1936 Olympics. The plot centers around journalists sent to report about the Olympics, focusing on the US Basketball Team, the US Swim Team, and the US Track and Field Team. Opening night was May 1, 2015.

=== Double Feature at Hollywood and Vine, an adaptation of Twelfth Night ===
Inspired by Shakespeare's Twelfth Night, the 2014 Waa-Mu Show was Double Feature at Hollywood and Vine. The protagonist, Viola, disguises herself as a man to find fame as an actor in the 1930s. Opening night was May 2, 2014.

=== Flying Home ===
The 2013 performance, Flying Home, combined the ideas of three well-known productions, Peter Pan, Alice in Wonderland, and The Wizard of Oz. It is about adolescents leaving home and developing throughout college. Opening night was May 3, 2013.

== List of Shows ==
Year	Show	Co-Chairs
2023	Romance En Route	Francis Brenner, Mitchell Huntley, Daniel Maton, Madeline Oberle
2022	A Peculiar Inheritance	Daniel Maton, Madeline Oberle
2021	The Secret of Camp Elliott	Anna Beaubien, Pallas Gutierrez, Jessica Nekritz
2020	State of the Art	Emma Griffone, Leo Jared Scheck, Jonathan Toussaint, Olivia Worley
2019	For the Record	Gabriella Green, Ziare Paul-Emile, Alexander Rothfield, Lindsay Whisler
2018	Manhattan Miracle	Maxwell Beer, Kaja Burke-Williams, Sarah Ohlson, Andrew Restieri
2017	Beyond Belief: A Superhero Story	Jessie Jennison, Charlotte Morris, Eric Peters, Justin Tepper
2016	Another Way West	Myrna Conn, Fergus Inder, Charlie Oh, Elizabeth Romero
2015	Gold	Hannah Dunn, Kylie Mullins, Max Rein
2014	Double Feature At Hollywood And Vine	Ryan Bernsten, Ryan Garson, Desiree Staples
2013	Flying Home	Jack Mitchell, Jesse Rothschild, Ed Wasserman
2012	Off The Map	Jon Harrison, Rachel Shapiro, Patrick Sulken
2011	What's Next	Melissa Lynch, Liz Olanoff
2010	Keeping Time	RB Embleton, Lindsay Powell
2009	One For The Books	Julia Beck, Kaitlin Fine, Cara Rifkin, Eugenio Vargas
2008	Skylines	Kristin Johnson, Maureen Rohn
2007	The Club	Amanda Krieg, Justin Mann
2006	Jubilee!	Antonette Balestreri, Liz Kimball, Charlie Siebert
2005	Waiting In The Wings	Alan Schmuckler, Claire Wilmoth, Jarrod Zimmerman
2004	POMP And Circumstance	Kenneth Ferrone, Michael Mahler, Jessica Scholl
2003	This Just In...	Amber Makalous, Christine Mild, Joe Schenck
2002	Are We There Yet?	Andrew Hotz, Emily Price, Kevin Vortmann
2001	Sorry, We're Booked	Jen Bender, Dan Brintz
2000	Past Perfect Future Tense	Mark Ledbetter, Anne E. Mannal
1999	New York, NU York	Matt Dudley, Kate Shindle, Kate Strohbehn
1998	Stay Tuned!	Meredith McDonough, Ian Roth
1997	All Grown Up!	Dan Lipton, Randy Meyer
1996	Timeless	Sloan Just, Kristofer McNeeley
1995	Rites Of Spring	Zeena Hamir, Jordan G. Neiman
1994	Lost & Found	Chad Borden, Matthew Meltzer, Alison Sneegas
1993	On The Town*	Chad Borden, Jason Cochran, Jennifer Gordon
1992	Hello, Big Time	Keith Everett, Richard Segall, Julie Williams
1991	Sign Me Up	Lisa Cavallari, Thomas Hoegh, Becca Kaufman, Matthew Mailman, Eric Saiet
1990	It's About Time	Thomas Hoegh, Brian d'Arcy James, Jody Plotkin, Brayer Teague, Todd Wadhams
1989	Throw Me A Line!	Brian Elliott, Stephen Gundersheim, Brian d'Arcy James, Jody Plotkin, Amanda Rogers
1988	What's In A Game?	Scott Benjaminson, Mark Ledogar, Lori Longstreth
1987	With A Twist	Martin Drobac, Laverne McKinnon, Scott Zacher
1986	Star-Craving Mad	John E. Kolb, Robert R. Walther
1985	Sumthing's Up	Richard Feldman, Janet Ponsiglione
1984	Suitable For Framing	Paul F. Burtis, Douglas T. Toth
1983	Wake The Neighbors, Phone The Dog	Thaddeus A. Gentry, Dale S. Rieling
1982	Out On A Whim	Richard Heimler, Jodi Weinstein
1981	To The Memories	Fred Hanson, Jon Nakagawa
1980	Gimme A Break	John Burley, Nina Skriloff
1979	Cover To Cover	Winifred Freedman, Johan Sauer
1978	Wake Me At Eight	Robert Banks, Betsy Greene
1977	Wild Onions	Betsy Greene, Michael Higgins
1976	That's The Spirit	Philip Curley, Susan Socolowski
1975	Quick Change	Erik Haagensen, Suzanne Thomas
1974	Keep In Touch	Anne Arkin, Bryan England
1973	Kicks	Kathryn Blind, Daniel Connolly
1972	72 Flavors	Denise Jarrett, William J. Wilson
1971	Thanks A Lot	Estelle Danish, Andrew Harris (stopped 75% student ticket plan)
1970	Booster Shot	Sandra Holland, Michael Meagher
1969	Present Tense	Murray Dawson, Barbara Lehner
1968	The Natives Are Restless	Frank Corbin, Barbara Klages
1967	You'll Get Used To It	Louis Magor, Marilyn McGredy
1966	Strings & Things	Patricia Baggs, Dwight Frindt
1965	Promise Not To Tell	Edward Euler, Judith Pinkerton
1964	Something In The Wind	Sue Ramaker, Robert Strunk
1963	Mud In Your Eye	Michael Griffith, Carole Shirreffs
1962	Signs Of Life	Robert Bonges, Karla Herbold
1961	Don't Make A Scene	Bruce Burmester, Virginia Jung
1960	Among Friends	Elizabeth Wehde, William J. White
1959	Good Grief	Glenna Arnold, John Gerber
1958	Sing No Evil	Richard Kissel, Carolyn Robson
1957	Caught In The Act	Carol Beachler, Ronald Church
1956	Silver Jubilee	Jon Larson, Ann Palmer
1955	High Time	Joyce Lemon, Jeremy Wilson
1954	See Here	Robert Magee, Jane Taylor
1953	Reach For The Sky	Rosetta Beamer, Allan Bowermaster
1952	Taxi, Please	Leona Iwaniec, G. Allan West
1951	That Reminds Me	Carol Anderson, William G. Whitney
1950	Look Who's Talking	Jane Harr, John F. Hayford
1949	What's The Rush	Nancy Henninger, Cliff Mezey
1948	See How They Run	Walt Kemp, A. Rae Womble
1947	Break The News	Pete Peterson, Juanita Richards
1946	Here We Go Again	Doris Helm, Max Myover
1943, 1944, 1945	(No Production)	Waa-Mu suspends performances during World War II years. Previous show profits invested in war bonds.
1942	Wish You Were Here	Bev Coffman, Dick Jager
1941	Wait A Minute	William Barr, Janice Raymond
1940	Here's Your Party	Don J. Ramaker, Frances F. Whittemore (adapted the revue format officially)
1939	Guess Again	Al Hickox, Ruth Marcus
1938	Of Thee I Sing*	Betsy Garrison, George Kemp
1937	Don't Look Now	Robert W. Grant Jr., Ruth Hoagland
1936	It Goes To Show	Clay Hoffer, Frank Seyl
1935	Good News*	Robert Goman, Zaida Hutchins
1934	Sweet Music	Virginia Cleaveland, Charles Southward
1933	Hats Off	Robert McManus, Virginia Stone
1932	Step This Way	Eloise Barclay, Howard Packard
1931	Many Thanks	Jack Leach, Avis Lundahl
1930	Whoa There	Ethel Finn, Preston Weir (sold to Universal Pictures; Life Begins At College)
1929	Good Morning Glory	Lois Stewart, Darrell Ware

Shows with (*) denote previously produced and non-student written material.
