= Elder Hall =

Elder Hall may refer to:

- Elder Hall, Adelaide, a concert hall at Adelaide University, Australia
- Elder Hall (Northwestern University), a hall of residence at Northwestern University, Evanston, Illinois, US
