= Netsch =

Netsch is a surname. Notable people with the surname include:

- Dawn Clark Netsch (1926–2013), American lawyer and politician
- Walter Netsch (1920–2008), American architect
