= Swift Hall =

Swift Hall may refer to:

- Annie May Swift Hall (built 1895), a building at the Northwestern University School of Communication
- Swift Hall, also known as Swift Hall of Engineering (built 1909), a building at the Northwestern University School of Communication
- Swift Hall (built 1900, remodeled 1941), a building at Vassar College
- Swift Hall (built 1925), a building at the University of Cincinnati
- Swift Hall (built 1926), a building at the University of Chicago Divinity School

== See also ==
- All pages mentioning Swift Hall
