= Montgomery County Courthouse (Illinois) =

- U.S. National Register of Historic Places
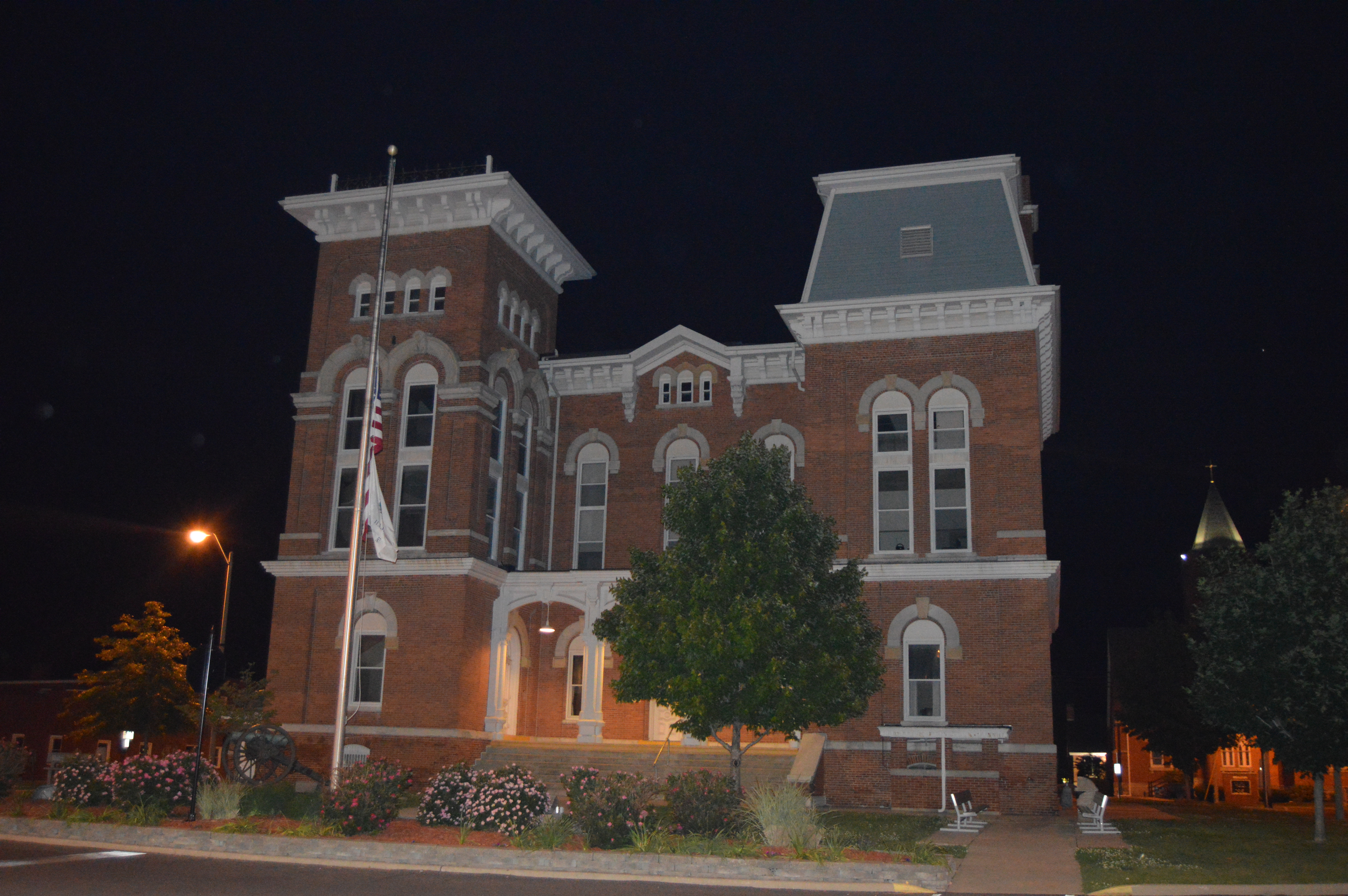

- Location within Illinois Location within the United States
- Interactive map showing the location of Montgomery County Courthouse
- Location: Courthouse Sq., Hillsboro, Illinois
- Coordinates: 39°9′40″N 89°29′36″W
- Area: less than one acre
- Architect: Gurdon P. Randall
- Architectural style: Second Empire
- NRHP reference No.: 94001266
- Added to NRHP: October 28, 1994

The Montgomery County Courthouse, located in Courthouse Square in Hillsboro, is the county courthouse serving Montgomery County, Illinois. While the courthouse was originally built in 1833–35, it did not attain its current form until an extensive remodeling in 1868–71. Architect Gurdon P. Randall designed the remodeled courthouse in the Second Empire style. The courthouse's design features two towers: a square tower enclosing a staircase at the southwest corner, and a tower with a mansard roof at the southeast corner. The courthouse's cornice, which runs along the roof line and the bottom of the mansard roof, features decorative brackets. Since the renovated courthouse reopened, it has continuously served as the seat of county government functions.

The courthouse was added to the National Register of Historic Places on October 28, 1994. The Montgomery County Courthouse also holds court sessions on cases brought to it within its 4th Circuit jurisdiction.
