= Union Park Congregational Church and Carpenter Chapel =

Historic church in Illinois, United States

- U.S. National Register of Historic Places
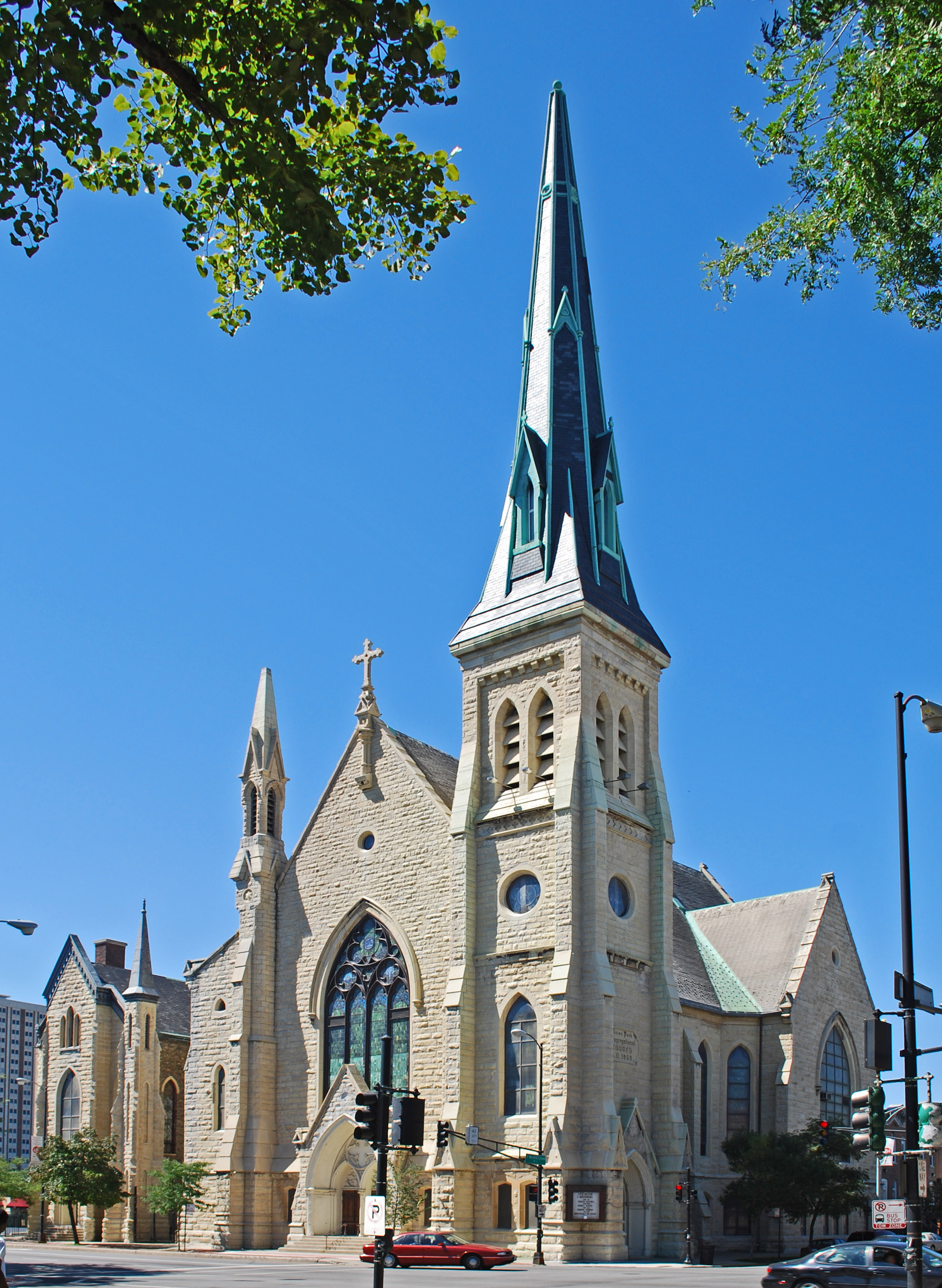

- Location within Chicago metropolitan area Location within Illinois Location within the United States
- Location: 60 N. Ashland Blvd., Chicago, Illinois
- Coordinates: 41°53′6″N 87°40′3″W
- Area: less than one acre
- Built: 1869
- Architect: Randall, Gurdon P.; Otis L. Wheelock
- Architectural style: Gothic
- NRHP reference No.: 06000446
- Added to NRHP: May 31, 2006

Union Park Congregational Church and Carpenter Chapel (also known as First Baptist Congregational Church) is a historic church building at 60 N. Ashland Blvd. on the Near West Side of Chicago, Illinois. The chapel is named after Philo Carpenter, a deacon, a co-founder of the congregation and of the Chicago Theological Seminary, and an early donor of the original church who was also a noted abolitionist and the city's first druggist. The two buildings are considered as a unit; together, they are a Chicago Landmark and an Illinois Historic Landmark and are listed on the National Register of Historic Places. The church building is currently occupied by the First Baptist Congregational Church, whose official mailing address is 1613 W. Washington Blvd. in Chicago.

The Gothic Revival chapel was designed by architect Otis Wheelock, partner of W. W. Boyington in the firm of Boyington & Wheelock, for the Chicago Theological Seminary, which was located on the same campus; the chapel was completed the same year that construction began on the church. The church, also in Gothic Revival, was designed by architect Gurdon P. Randall and was constructed between 1869 and 1871; it was added to the National Register of Historic Places in 2006.
