= Darrell Ware =

American film producer

Darrell Ware (1906–1944) was an American screenwriter and film producer. Ware and Karl Tunberg were nominees for the Academy Award for Best Original Screenplay at the 14th Academy Awards for their film Tall, Dark, and Handsome.

Ware wrote and contributed to the writing of several films starring Shirley Temple while he was under contract to 20th Century Fox. Ware joined Paramount Studios in 1942, where he wrote for film stars including Bing Crosby, Alan Ladd, and Paulette Goddard.

As a senior at Northwestern University in 1929, Ware co-wrote the script for and staged the college musical comedy that became "The Waa-Mu Show".

== Selected filmography ==
- Submarine Patrol (1938) (co-screenwriter)
- Hotel for Women (1939)
- Public Deb No. 1 (1940)
