= Morgan County Courthouse (Illinois) =

Local government building in the United States

- U.S. National Register of Historic Places
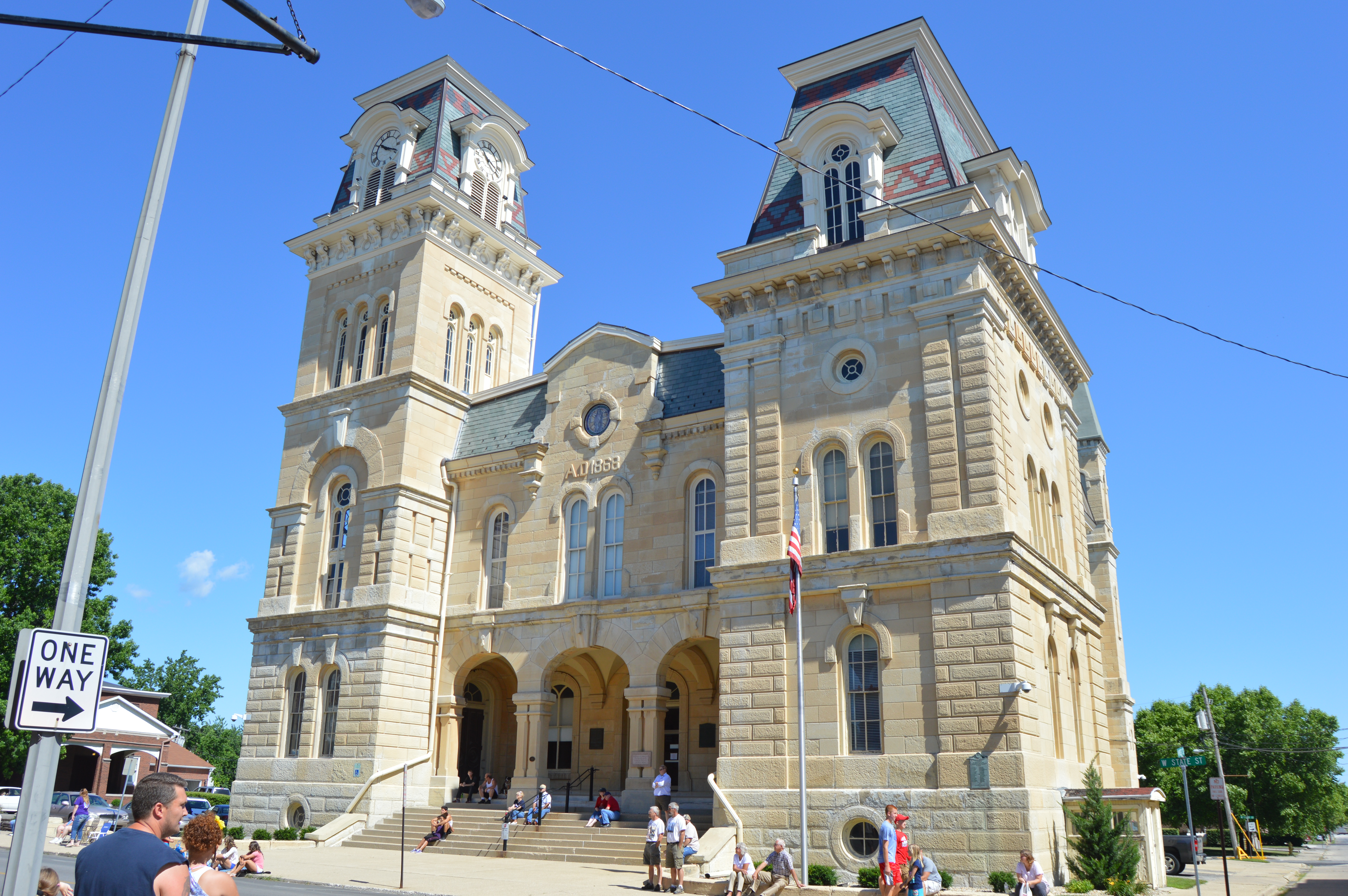

- Location within Illinois Location within the United States
- Interactive map showing the location of Morgan County Courthouse
- Location: 300 W. State St., Jacksonville, Illinois
- Coordinates: 39°44′4″N 90°13′54″W
- Area: less than one acre
- Built: 1868–69
- Built by: Underwood, C.R.
- Architect: Randall, Gurdon P.
- Architectural style: Second Empire, Italian Villa
- NRHP reference No.: 86003167
- Added to NRHP: November 19, 1986

The Morgan County Courthouse, located at 300 W. State St. in Jacksonville, is the county courthouse of Morgan County, Illinois. The courthouse, the third built in Morgan County, was constructed from 1868 to 1869. Chicago architect Gurdon P. Randall designed the courthouse in a combination of the Italianate and Second Empire styles. The design is considered unusual among county courthouses, as counties generally preferred more traditional designs. Randall's design features an arched loggia surrounding the building's southern entrance, asymmetrical towers at the southern corners with mansard roofs and bracketed cornices, arched dormers within the towers' mansards, and an assortment of round-head and bulls-eye windows. One of the towers houses a 4,000 pounds (1,800 kg) bell, which was intended to be part of a clock that was never installed. A 9-foot (2.7 m) statue of Lady Justice, carved from a single block of pine, originally topped the front entrance; however, after losing its arms around 1872, the statue disappeared in the early 1900s and was never recovered.

The courthouse was added to the National Register of Historic Places on November 19, 1986.
