= First Baptist Congregational Church =

Church in Chicago, IL, United States of America

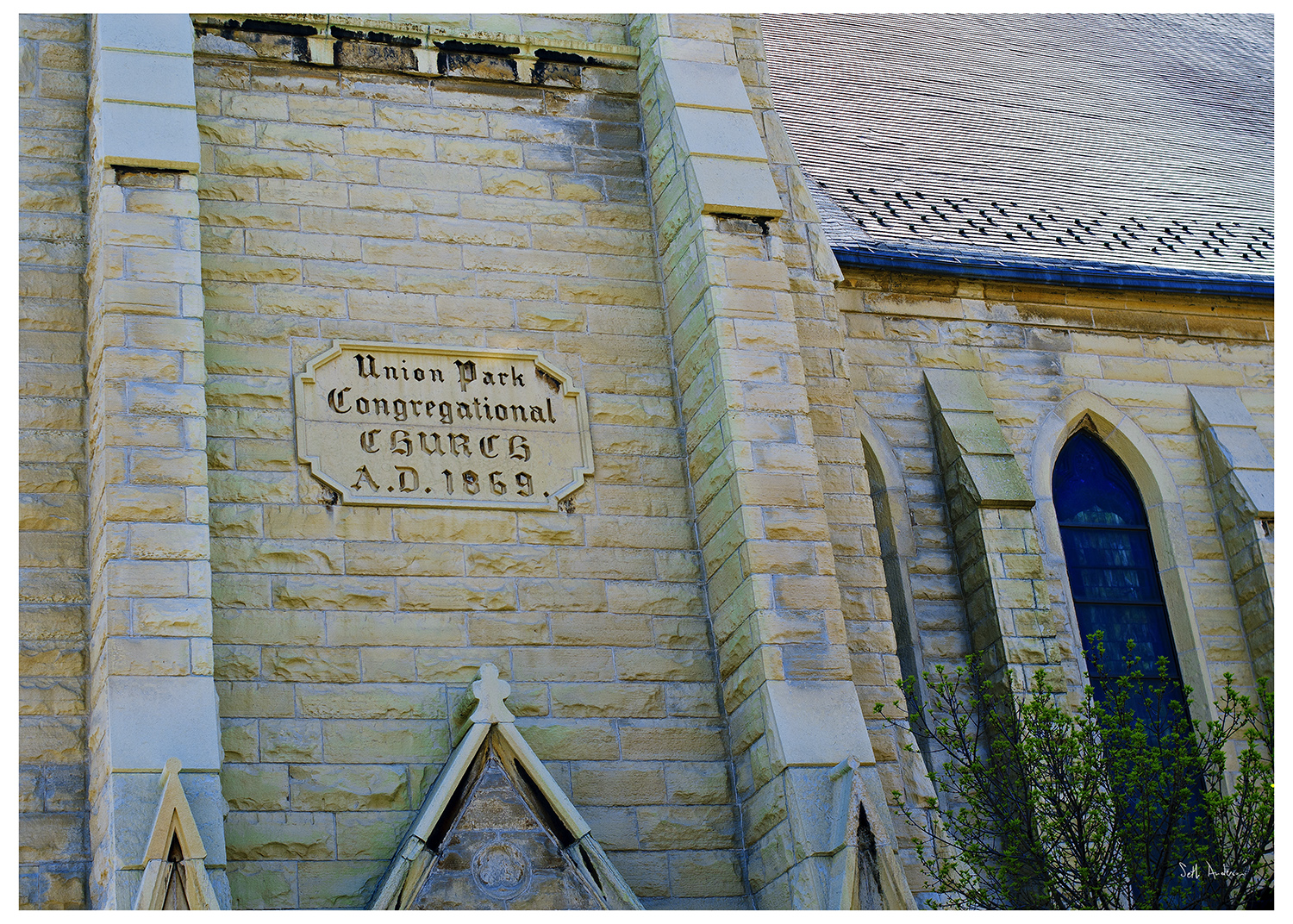
- Building designation for the church

Religion
- Affiliation: United Church of Christ and Baptist
- Leadership: Rev. George W. Daniels (Senior Pastor)
- Status: Active

Location
- Location: Chicago, Illinois, United States
- Interactive map of First Baptist Congregational Church
- Coordinates: 41.8830°N 87.6673°W

Architecture
- Architect: Gurdon P. Randall
- Style: Gothic
- Completed: 1871

Specifications
- Capacity: 1800
- Spire: 2

Website
- http://www.fbcc-chicago.net/

Chicago Landmark
- Designated: January 21, 1982

First Baptist Congregational Church is a United Church of Christ and Baptist congregation currently located at 60 N. Ashland Blvd. in Chicago, Illinois, United States. The church building is an Illinois Historic Landmark and is listed on the National Register of Historic Places. The building was designed by architect Gurdon P. Randall for the Union Park Congregational Church, founded in 1860, and was built between 1869 and 1871. After the Great Chicago Fire of 1871, the Mayor's Office, City Council, and General Relief Committee of Chicago were temporarily headquartered in the church. In 1910, the building of nearby First Congregational Church (founded in 1851) burnt down. Union Park Congregational then merged with First Congregational to form (New) First Congregational Church. Two other congregations would eventually merge into the new First Congregational Church: Leavitt Street Congregational Church (founded in 1868) in 1917 and Bethany Congregational Church in the 1920s.

On August 6, 1944, the Mozart Baptist Church was founded at 114 N. Mozart Street in Chicago. In 1951, the growing congregation moved to a building at 2900 W. Adams Street. In 1970, the majority-black Mozart Baptist merged with First Congregational to form First Congregational Baptist Church. The merged congregation continued to meet in the First Congregational building.

The Lemont limestone building, which has a slate roof, is nearly square in plan except for shallow transepts barely a few feet deep at the north and south sides. The interior was designed by Randall in amphitheater style, with a nod to the sermon-centered Congregational service. Randall is often credited with originating this seating design, which has been widely imitated over the years. Immediately adjacent to the south is the smaller Carpenter Chapel, a long rectangular space with a simpler plastered and wood-trimmed interior; its exterior is also of Lemont limestone and is built in a similar style. The Carpenter Chapel's spire, the church's thin south spire, and the steeple together form a line of increasing height from left to right, visually joining the two structures. Part of the main church building's roof and interior were severely damaged in the February 2, 2011 blizzard.

The church is highlighted in many books on church architecture, among them, "Chicago Churches: A Photographic Essay" by Elizabeth Johnson (Uppercase Books Inc, 1999) as well as "Chicago Churches and Synagogues: An Architectural Pilgrimage" by George A. Lane, SJ and Algimantas Kezys, SJ (Loyola Press, 1982). The building is an Illinois Historic Landmark and is listed on the National Register of Historic Places. It was designated a Chicago Landmark on January 21, 1982.
