= Submarine Patrol =

1938 film by John Ford

- 1938 theatrical poster
- Directed by: John Ford
- Written by: Rian James; Darrell Ware; Jack Yellen; William Faulkner (uncredited)
- Based on: the novel The Splinter Fleet of the Otranto Barrage by Ray Milholland
- Produced by: Darryl F. Zanuck
- Starring: Richard Greene; Nancy Kelly; Preston Foster; George Bancroft
- Cinematography: Arthur C. Miller
- Edited by: Robert L. Simpson
- Distributed by: 20th Century Fox
- Release date: November 25, 1938
- Running time: 95 minutes
- Country: United States
- Language: English
- Budget: over $1 million

Submarine Patrol is a 1938 war film directed by John Ford. The screenplay was by Rian James, Darrell Ware, and Jack Yellen. The film starred Richard Greene, Nancy Kelly and Preston Foster. The supporting cast features George Bancroft, Elisha Cook, Jr., John Carradine, Maxie Rosenbloom, Jack Pennick, Ward Bond and an unbilled Lon Chaney Jr. as a Marine sentry. The movie was partly written by William Faulkner.

The film was based on the book The Splinter Fleet of the Otranto Barrage by Ray Millholland.

== Plot ==
In Brooklyn, "millionaire playboy" Perry Townsend III uses his connection to an admiral to join the Navy—without undergoing any training whatsoever—for World War I and is immediately assigned as chief engineer of the sub chaser S. C. 599, part of the "splinter fleet". On the way to the ship, he fixes a stalled truck engine for Susan Leeds, who is unimpressed, as is his girlfriend Anne. Later, Townsend hitches a ride with Leeds and becomes better acquainted with her, learning that she works on her father's freighter the Maria Ann, which transports war supplies.

A yachtsman, Townsend is unimpressed with his new ship and its disgruntled, slovenly crew. They warm up to him when he takes them out to a dive and pays for their drinks. Encountering Susan there with her father's first mate McAlliston, Townsend takes her to a fancy establishment for drinks and dancing. After he sees her home (at 4 am), she kisses him, before entering her cabin. However, her father orders Townsend to stop seeing his daughter. Townsend continues seeing her anyway. Captain Leeds finds out and punches Townsend.

Meanwhile, Lieutenant (junior grade) John C. Drake has been found guilty of "gross negligence", despite "extenuating circumstances", for being on watch when his destroyer ran onto some rocks. He is assigned command of the 599. His sympathetic superior does assign him four veteran seamen, including Drake's old friend "Sails" Quincannon. He quickly imposes discipline. Townsend complains to the admiral, but is told to do his job.

Drake is ordered to escort a convoy to Italy, which includes Susan's freighter. On the night of Friday the 13th, the lookout Pratt raises a false alarm, followed by a real sighting of a periscope. The 599 sinks a German U-boat with depth charges. They reach the port of Brindisi.

When Townsend is prevented from speaking to Susan, he sends a message asking her to meet him at the Hotel Rex and telling her that he loves her. There he proposes to her. She agrees, but her father arrives, punches Townsend again, and drags Susan back to the ship. Before Townsend can do anything, he is told that the 599 is sailing immediately to attack a submarine nicknamed "Old Man 26", which has just sunk its 31st victim. Its base in the Adriatic Sea has finally been located. It is protected by a thick minefield, so Drake is only authorized to take volunteers; the entire crew volunteer. Meanwhile, Captain Leeds learns that Townsend really has arranged to marry Susan. He hurries to the 599, but Townsend knocks him out before he can say anything. When he comes to and learns what the mission is, he volunteers to man the engine room with Townsend. Drake sinks the enemy submarine and returns in triumph.

The wedding is prepared, but the 599 is ordered to sail for Malta for repairs. The Maria Ann comes up alongside, and Susan shouts that she will wait for Townsend.

== Cast ==
- Richard Greene as Perry Townsend III
- Nancy Kelly as Susan Leeds
- Preston Foster as J. C. Drake
- George Bancroft as Captain Leeds
- Slim Summerville as Spuds
- John Carradine as McAllison
- Joan Valerie as Anne
- Henry Armetta as Luigi
- Warren Hymer as Rocky
- Douglas Fowley as Brett
- J. Farrell MacDonald as Sails
- Maxie Rosenbloom as Joe Duffy
- Dick Hogan as Johnny Miller
- Ward Bond as Olaf
- Charles Tannen as Kelly
- Robert Lowery as Sparks
- George E. Stone as Irving
- Elisha Cook Jr. as Professor
- Jack Pennick as Guns McPeek
- Charles Trowbridge as Rear Admiral Joseph Maitland
- Moroni Olsen as Captain Wilson
- Harry Strang as Grainger
- Victor Varconi as Chaplain
- Lon Chaney Jr. as Marine sentry (unbilled)

== Reception ==
Time Out stated "Ford keeps the narrative and action buzzing, but this is a pale example of the Master's work."
