= Gurdon P. Randall =

American architect

Gurdon Paine Randall
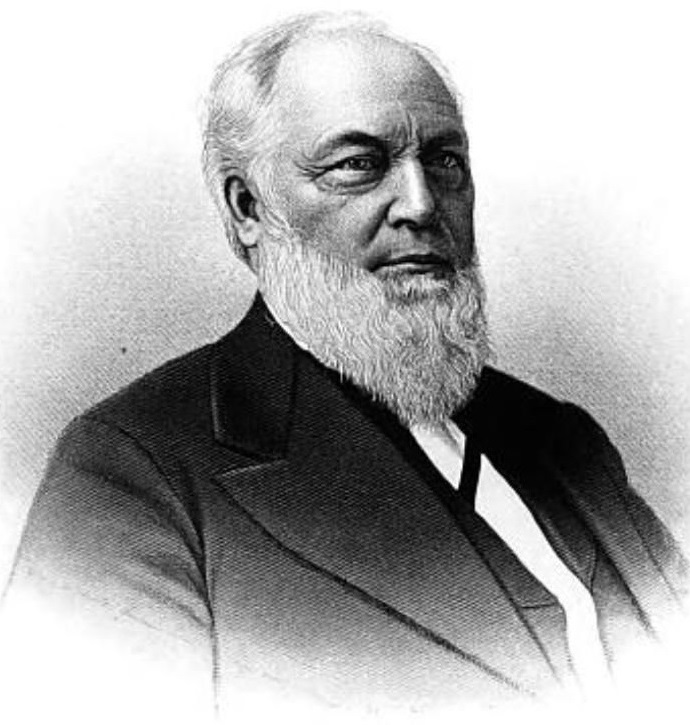
- From 1883's The United States Biographical Dictionary and Portrait Gallery of Eminent and Self-Made Men. Illinois Volume.
- Born: February 18, 1821; Braintree, Vermont
- Died: September 20, 1884 (aged 63); Northfield, Vermont
- Occupation: Architect

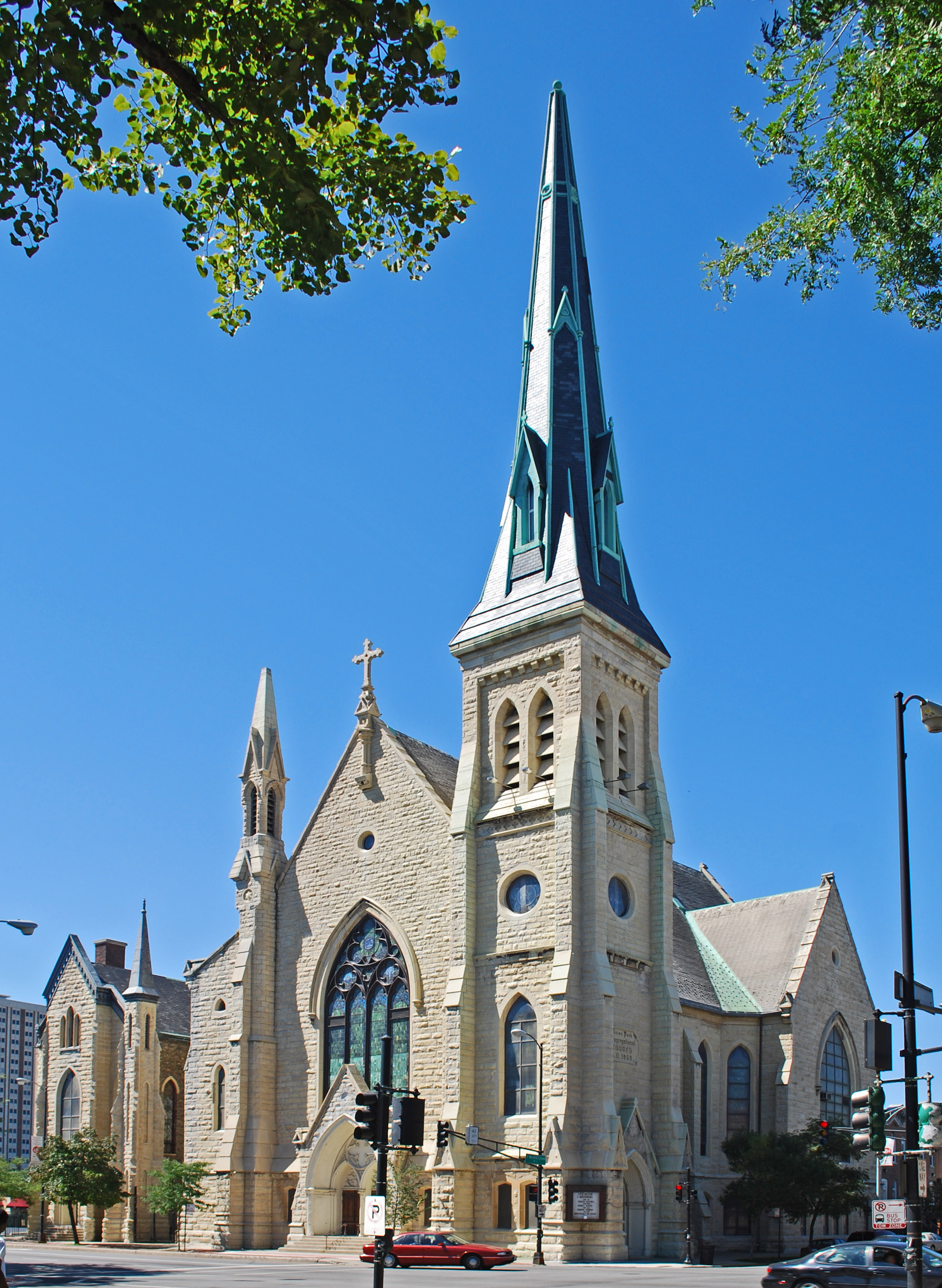
Union Park Congregational Church, Chicago, 1869.

Gurdon P. Randall (February 18, 1821– September 20, 1884) was an architect in Chicago, Illinois. Early in his career, he studied in Boston, Massachusetts, in the office of Asher Benjamin. He moved to Chicago when he was 30, and practiced there for 34 years, focusing on large institutional architecture. He designed a number of notable buildings, including several that survive and are listed on the National Register of Historic Places.

== Biography ==
Gurdon P. Randall was born in Braintree, Vermont on February 18, 1821. His siblings included Francis V. Randall, an attorney and Union Army officer during the American Civil War. He attended public school and assisted his father in lumbering and carpentry. Randall married Louisa Caroline Drew on January 31, 1842. When he was twenty-two, Randall moved to Boston, Massachusetts to study architecture with Asher Benjamin and G. W. Gray. In 1845 he returned to Vermont, establishing an architect's office at Northfield, later relocating to the larger town of Rutland. Randall specialized in railroad buildings, designing many of the structures on the Vermont Central and Rutland & Burlington lines. In Rutland Randall worked with his brother J. J. R. Randall, who succeeded to the practice when he relocated, in 1850, to Syracuse, New York. He practiced there for another six years.

In 1856, he moved west to Chicago, Illinois. There, he focused on designing public buildings such as county courthouses and churches. Major commissions in the Chicago area included University Hall at Northwestern University, Union Park Congregational Church, Eighth Presbyterian Church, and Plymouth Church. He also designed plans for the Theological Seminary of the Northwest and the original University of Saint Mary's of the Lake. Many of his Chicago works were destroyed in the Great Chicago Fire in 1871. Outside of the Chicago area, Randall also designed some of the first buildings at The State Normal University in Bloomington, Illinois; the Minnesota State Normal School in Winona, Minnesota; and the Whitewater Normal School in Whitewater, Wisconsin. He died on September 20, 1884.

== Architectural works ==
Year	Project	Address	City	State	Notes	Image	Reference
1867	Plymouth Congregational Church	S Wabash Ave and E 9th St	Chicago	Illinois	Later the St. Mary R. C. Church. Demolished in 1971.		
1868	Madison County Courthouse	201 W Court St	Winterset	Iowa	Destroyed by fire in 1875, and rebuilt largely on the same lines from 1876-78 under the direction of Alfred H. Piquenard. The rebuilt courthouse was listed on the National Register of Historic Places in 1981.		
1868	Montgomery County Courthouse	105 Courthouse Sq	Hillsboro	Illinois	Listed on the National Register of Historic Places in 1994.		
1868	Morgan County Courthouse	300 W State St	Jacksonville	Illinois	Listed on the National Register of Historic Places in 1986.		
1868	University Hall, Northwestern University	633 Clark St	Evanston	Illinois			
1869	Congregational Church of Iowa City	30 N Clinton St	Iowa City	Iowa	Listed on the National Register of Historic Places in 1973.		
1869	Union Park Congregational Church (former)	60 N Ashland Blvd	Chicago	Illinois	Presently the First Baptist Congregational Church. Listed on the National Register of Historic Places in 2006.		
1870	Marshall County Courthouse	117 W Jefferson St	Plymouth	Indiana	Listed on the National Register of Historic Places in 1983.		
1870	Ladies' Hall	420 N Park St	Madison	Wisconsin	First coed dorm at a public institution in the U.S. Demolished in 1957.		
1871	Administration Building, Mercer University	1501 Mercer University Dr	Macon	Georgia	Renamed in 2006 for R. Kirby Godsey. Listed on the National Register of Historic Places in 1971, and contributes to the Macon Historic District, listed in 1974.		
1871	Willard Hall (former), Northwestern University	711 Elgin Rd	Evanston	Illinois	Originally built by the Evanston College for Ladies, which merged with Northwestern University in 1873. Most recently known as the Music Administration Building.		
1872	Omaha High School	124 N 20th St	Omaha	Nebraska	Replaced gradually by present school on same site, demolished in process		
1872	Bibb County Courthouse	601 Mulberry St	Macon	Georgia	Demolished in 1924.		
1872	Spaulding Building	301-303 S State St	Chicago	Illinois	Demolished.		
1874	Benton County Courthouse	706 E 5th St	Fowler	Indiana	Listed on the National Register of Historic Places in 2008.		
1875	Menominee County Courthouse	839 10th Ave	Menominee	Michigan	Listed on the National Register of Historic Places in 1975.		
