= University Hall (Northwestern University) =

Coordinates: 42.0519°N 87.6760°W

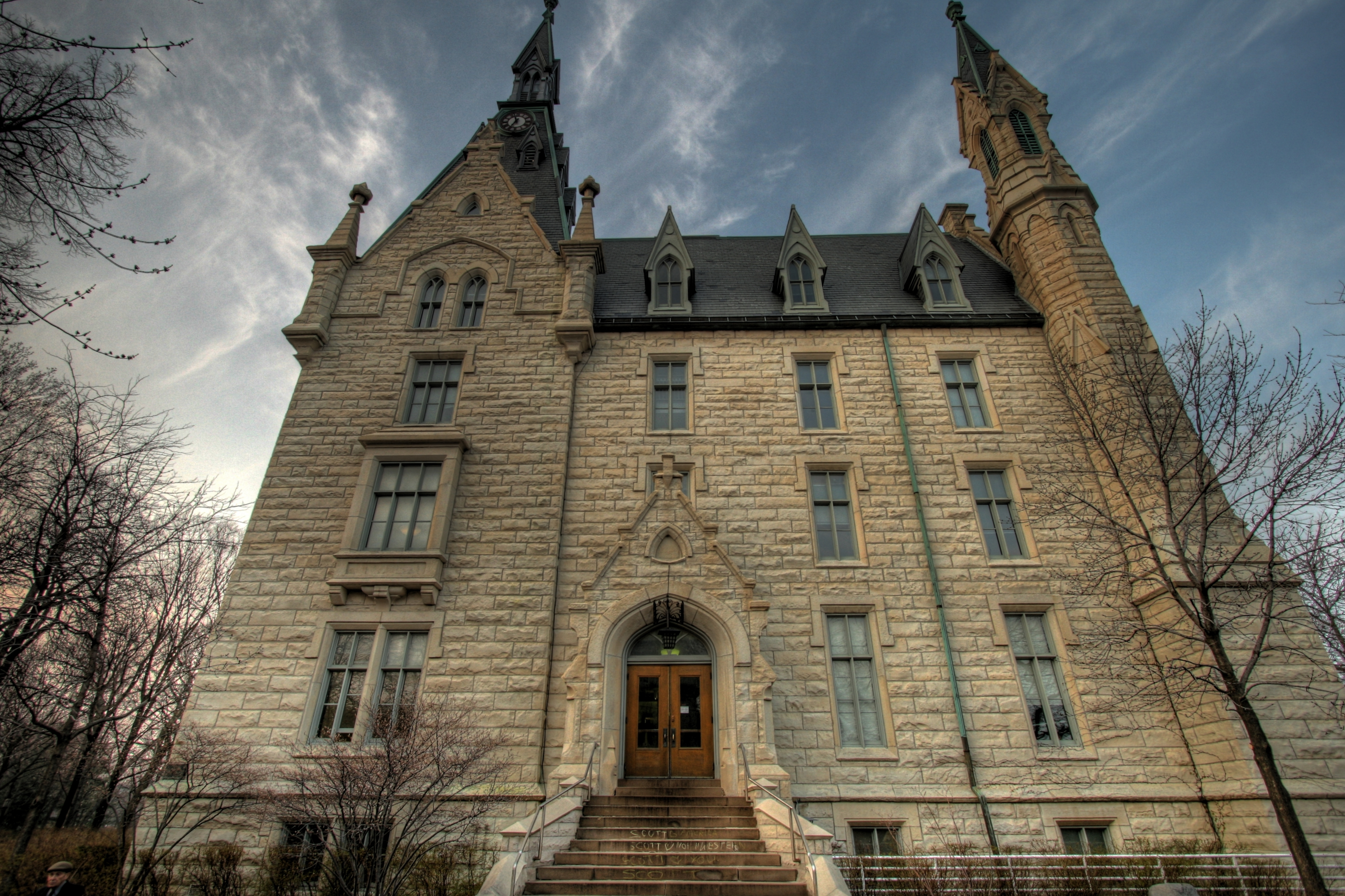
- Interactive map of the University Hall area

General information
- Location: Evanston, United States
- Construction started: 1868
- Completed: 1869
- Owner: Northwestern University

Design and construction
- Architect: Gurdon P. Randall

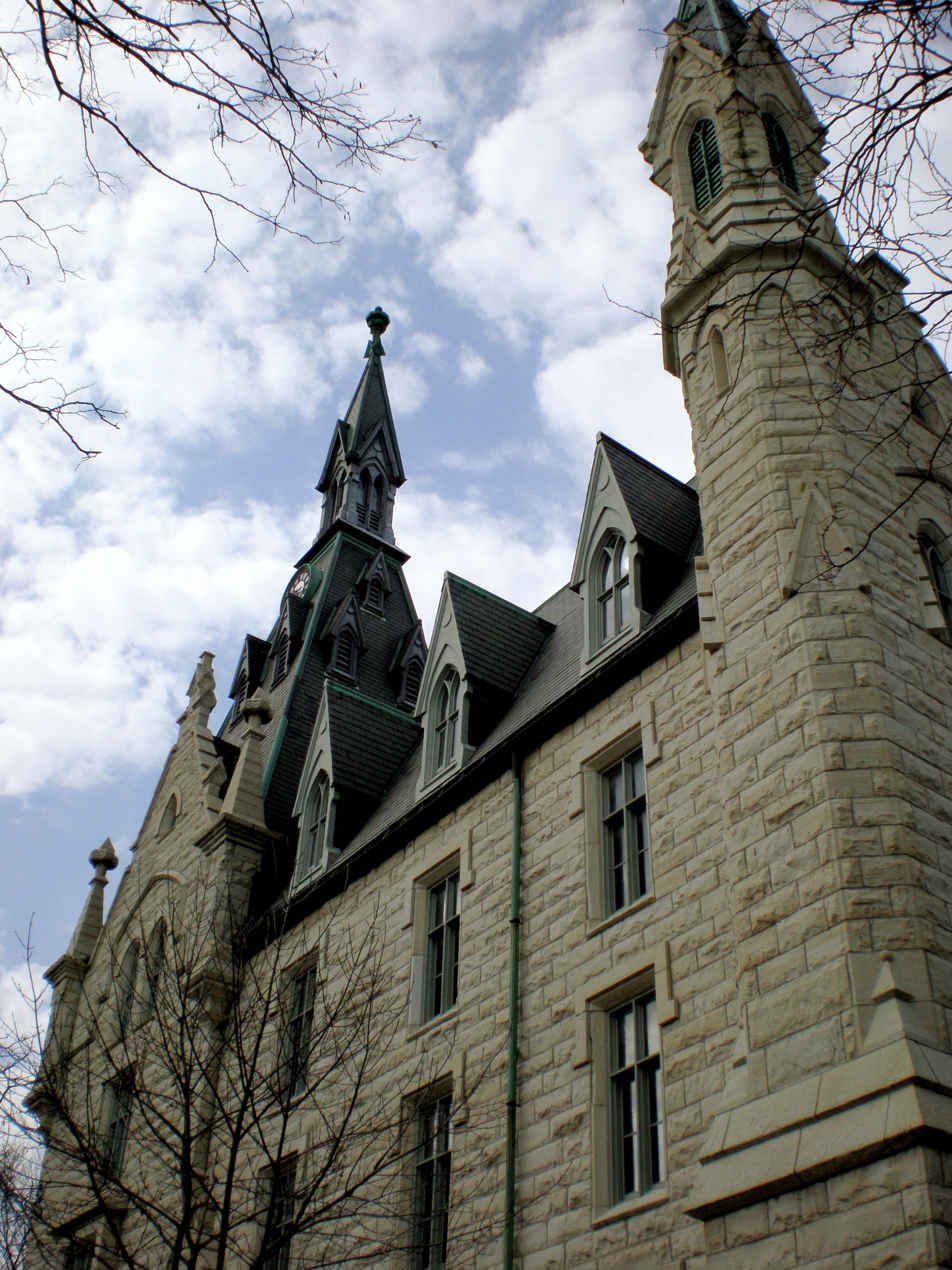
University Hall in the present day.

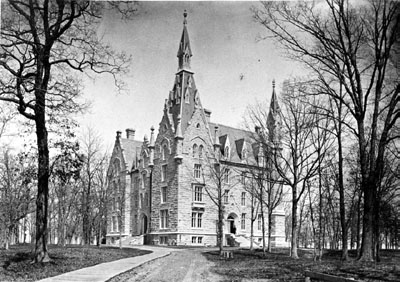
University Hall as it appeared in 1877.

University Hall is the oldest original building on the Northwestern University campus in Evanston, Illinois, and the second building to have been constructed after Old College, which stood on campus until the 1970s. It is also the 25th oldest building in the state. The building has served a wide range of different roles since its construction, and currently houses the university's English department.

== History ==
University Hall was designed in Victorian Gothic style by Gurdon P. Randall, and is composed of Joliet limestone - the same kind used to build the Chicago Water Tower. The construction materials were transported to the Evanston campus by lake boat and rail.

The cornerstone of the building was laid in 1868, and the structure was completed in 1869, at a total cost of $125,000. University Hall officially opened on September 8, 1869 and coincided with the inauguration of University President Erastus Otis Haven. Speakers at the opening ceremony included Illinois Governor John M. Palmer, and the new University President Haven, who called the structure, "the new and elegant University Building". The clock in the tower of University Hall was the gift of the Class of 1879; its movement was built by clockmaker Seth Thomas. In 1966, a new electrified clock replaced the old works, which are now located in the Smithsonian National Museum of American History in Washington, D.C.

Upon its completion, University Hall took over most university functions from Old College. University Hall originally contained classrooms housing all Northwestern University classes, the main campus library, a chemical lab, a chapel, two society rooms and a fourth-floor natural history museum. University Hall contained Northwestern's primary library until the construction of Lunt Library (now known as Lunt Hall) in the 1890s. Lunt Library was the first dedicated library building built on the campus of Northwestern University. Though University Hall was succeeded by Fayerweather Hall as the university's main building in 1887, throughout its history, University Hall served a variety of functions. Over the years University Hall has been the home of the central administration, the engineering school, a cafeteria, and faculty offices. University Hall underwent a $5.2 million renovation and was rededicated in 1993. The building is currently home to Northwestern's English department.
