= List of Northwestern University residences =

This is a list of residential buildings at Northwestern University; for a list of other buildings see List of Northwestern University buildings

This list of Northwestern University residences catalogues the on-campus housing options for the university's approximately 15,000 undergraduate and graduate students on the Evanston, Illinois campus.

== Residential colleges ==
These are the residential colleges that are located on the Evanston campus.

=== Ayers College of Commerce and Industry ===
The Thomas G. Ayers College of Commerce and Industry (CCI) is located next to the Henry Crown Sports Pavilion and Aquatic Center (SPAC) and just off of Lake Michigan. Built in 1991, it is divided into four floors, three of which are co-ed. CCI holds an annual Business Symposium, students to discuss business-related issues with leaders in the field.

=== Chapin Hall (Humanities Residential College) ===
Humanities Residential College (Chapin)
Type	Residential college
Established	1901
Faculty Chair	Tom Burke
Associate Chair	Jason K. Roberts
Assistant Chair	Courtney Rabada
President	Kendall Clark
Enrollment	72
Location	726 University Pl. Evanston IL 60201

Originally built in 1901, Julia A. Chapin Hall became a women's dorm for Northwestern University in 1967. However, in the fall of 1979, Northwestern gave the dorm to the Humanities College, thus establishing the Humanities Residential College at Chapin Hall. One of the smaller dorms, Chapin Hall houses 72 students in the biggest doubles on campus.

Chapin Hall has been renovated but maintained its patterned ceilings, wooden floors, and large stairways. The hall also includes a small library, three kitchenettes, a media lounge, and War Room containing an assortment of board games, a piano, and computers.

Chapin Hall is also known for partnering with Helicon, a literary and arts magazine founded by Chapin alumnae.

=== East Fairchild (Communications Residential College, CRC) ===
Communications Residential College (CRC)
Type	Residential college
Established	1981
Chair	Roger Boye
Assistant Chair	Hannah Feiner
President	Jessica Dean
Vice President	Lillian Ali
Tech Chair	James Lee
Academic Chair	Natalie Wells
Social Chair(s)	Jillian Olson and Amelie Nguyen
Treasurer	Emma Manley
Secretary	Ferrazza
Philanthropy Chair	Lindsey Nickel
Special Events Chair	Adrienne Scheide
IM Sports Chair	Mahalia Foster
Enrollment	104
Location	1855 Sheridan Rd. Evanston IL 60201

East Fairchild's focus is mass media, attracting students interested in film, television, radio and journalism. Informal lectures, known as firesides, often feature journalists and filmmakers.

CRC was built in 1981 as part of a $23 million South Campus project, which included the construction of 1861 Sheridan, 1835 Hinman and other residence halls. A $2 million gift from the Sherman Fairchild Foundation helped provide equipment and finance other expenses for the residential college. CRC's equipment includes a radio station, WXRU 640 AM, as well as two movie-screening rooms.

In 1987, a beloved and talented CRC resident, named Will Arnold, died in his sleep due to an arrhythmia. Will had been the college's equipment chair, and a fundraiser was inaugurated in his honor with half the proceeds going to the American Heart Association and half for CRC equipment and events. The fundraiser is called Radiothon, and it spans 50 hours of student-run radio shows. Events include a date auction, drag show, and a goods auction, with items and gift certificates donated by area merchants.

=== Hobart House (Women's Residential College) ===
Hobart House is the Women's Residential College, and is home to 50 undergraduate women. It was designed by the architect James Gamble Rogers, using Indiana limestone. It was named in honor of Emily Hatfield Hobart, a Northwestern University alumna who was killed in the civil strife in China in 1928 while serving as a missionary.

Hobart House opened as an all-women's residence hall within the East Sorority Quad in fall 1928. In 1981, the all-women's Allison Residential College, which had been founded five years earlier, moved to Hobart House and changed its name to the Women's Studies Residential College (WSRC). In 1988, the name was changed to the Women's Residential College (WRC) to encourage even broader participation by women.

=== Jones Fine and Performing Arts Residential College ===
Jones Fine and Performing Arts Residential College
Type	Residential college
Established	1982
President	Russell Pinzino
Enrollment	approx. 120
Location	1820 Sheridan Rd; Evanston IL 60201

Jones Residential College is the fine and performing arts residential college, located on the southern edge of campus, directly across the street from Lake Michigan.

Jones was opened in the fall of 1982 as part of the residential college system. The building cost almost $2.5 million to develop, most of the funds coming from Wayne V. and Elizabeth R. Jones, to whom the building was dedicated. The Joneses were alumni of Northwestern from the graduating class of 1923. The facilities of Jones include spaces for photo editing, music recording, sound editing, ceramics studio, art studio, music and theatrical rehearsal rooms, a dance studio, and a performance space.

=== Public Affairs Residential College (PARC) ===
Public Affairs Residential College (PARC)
Type	Residential college
Established	1992
Chair	Keith Woodhouse
President	Evan Weitzman
Vice President	Sarah Carlson
Treasurer	Isaiah Tatum
Academic Chairs	Maddy Goldman and Mandy Bu
Social Chair(s)	Sophia Zhang and Rose Bicas-Dolgen
Communication Chair	Jasmin Behnam
Enrollment	72
Location	650 Emerson Ave. Evanston IL 60201

The Public Affairs Residential College is a politics and social policy-themed residential college at Northwestern University. It is located in the North Mid-Quads (NMQ) building at 650 Emerson Street in the southern half of campus. PARC has one of the best locations on campus, conveniently located in between main campus and downtown Evanston.

In Fall 2015, PARC relocated from 1838 Chicago Avenue as part of the university's Housing Master Plan. PARC's executive board voted later that year to permanently remain in the recently renovated facility. Before that, North Mid-Quads was notably the freshman year dorm of Duchess of Sussex and School of Communications graduate Meghan Markle.

=== Residential College of Cultural and Community Studies (CCS) ===
Residential College of Cultural and Community Studies
Type	Residential college
Established	1972
Faculty Chair	Myrna García
Hall President	Regan Andringa-Seed
Enrollment	43
Location	2303 Sheridan Rd; Evanston IL 60201

The College of Cultural and Community Studies is one of the first residential colleges at Northwestern University and also the smallest. Founded in the fall of 1972, CCS was originally called the Urban Studies College. The college's main purpose was to provide a home to students interested in the interaction of diverse cultures and urban communities in the U.S. and abroad. Residents have majors in many different areas but share an interest in cultures and concern for local and global communities. In 2007, CCS won the Northwestern Green Cup, an annual competition among Northwestern undergraduate residences to conserve the most energy. In 2008, 2009 and 2010, CCS was the overall winner of Northwestern's RCB Field Day, an annual competition amongst Northwestern's 11 residential colleges.

=== Shepard Residential College ===
Shepard Residential College
Type	Residential college
Established	1972
Faculty Chair	Mark Witte
Associate Chair	Beth Pardoe
Assistant Chair	Jakob Reinke
President	Molly Stockmeyer
Vice President	Max Levine
Treasurer	Shanti Gallivan
Academic Co-Chair	Jane Mavis
Academic Co-Chair	Skye Swann
Social Co-Chair	Julianna Feit
Social Co-Chair	Ethan Weihl
Outreach Co-Chair	Mary “Myk” Kezdy
Outreach Co-Chair	Jackson Weber
Tech Chair	Jack Burkhardt
Enrollment	72
Fellows	27
Location	655 University Pl; Evanston, IL 60201

Shepard Residential College is one of the two multi-thematic residential colleges at Northwestern University. It is home to 72 students, making it a mid-sized residential college. Located at 655 University Place in a building known as South Mid Quads, Shepard is near downtown Evanston, as well as the southern half of campus.

Shepard Hall was constructed as part of Northwestern's Centennial celebration and was dedicated in November 1952 as an addition to the women's quadrangles. The original building was made possible by a donation from Mrs. Margaret Bowen Shepard to honor her husband and sister (who was the dean of women at Northwestern). Shepard began as a women's residence hall, but became a multi-thematic, coeducational residential college in 1972. In 2015, the Residential College permanently moved from its old home at 626 University Place to its new one in what used to be the South Mid-Quads building at 655 University Place.

Shepard Residential College offers a classroom, TV lounge, study lounge, and a meeting room. The TV Lounge is equipped with a big-screen television, gaming consoles, a ping-pong table. Additionally, Shepard has a full kitchen and laundry room for students to utilize.

The Residential College holds a number of events for its residents. These include fireside chats, where faculty and students give presentations about topics that they're passionate about. Shepard also hosts frequent game nights, movie nights, and culinary events.

=== Slivka Residential College for Science and Engineering ===
Slivka Residential College
Type	Residential college
Established	2002
Faculty Chair	Karen Chou
President	Jeremy White
Vice President	Emma Sliwinski
Treasurer	Nano Goldman
Social Chair	Chisa Yan
Facilities Chair	Olivia Fopeano
Academic Chair	Cooper Stringer
IT Chair	Mira Norman
Fellows Chairs	Zahra Nathani
Philanthropy Chair	Jessie Gerber
Publications Chair	Katie Song
Enrollment	137
Location	2332 Campus Drive; Evanston IL 60201

Slivka Hall was built in 2002 as Northwestern's residential college devoted to science and engineering. It was named after Ben Slivka, a Northwestern graduate of 1982 who headed Microsoft's Internet Explorer team up to version 3.0. Slivka is located on the northern part of campus in the Northeast Area. It lies between CCI and the fraternities. The nearest dining hall is Elder Hall.

While predominantly made up of engineers and scientists, the Slivka community has included students from all six of the Northwestern University schools. It is organized into suites by gender and has an unusually high retention rate of upperclassmen in comparison to its sister residential colleges. Slivka frequently invites professors and other Northwestern faculty, such as Sir Fraser Stoddart, to speak on subjects ranging from nanotechnology to the economics of the internet to social scandals in Elizabethan England. Slivka also hosts peer-to-peer (P2P) lunches twice a week, where Slivka fellows are invited to join the residents for lunch at Sargent Hall, and quarterly student-fellow receptions in which the fellows join the residents for a catered meal. Slivka's mascot is a cephalopod named "Harry".

Slivka has four floors and a basement. The basement houses the Discovery Room (a room containing computers, printers, and other assorted technology), a bike room, a music room, and a laundry room. The first floor connects to a store called Lisa's Cafe. The second floor has a recreation lounge, which contains a foosball table, a pool table, a table tennis table, two televisions, and other furniture. All of the floors contain suites and fully-equipped kitchens.

=== West Fairchild (International Studies Residential College) ===
1861 Sheridan Road

=== Willard Residential College ===
Willard Residential College
Type	Residential college
Established	1938
Faculty Chair	Gary Saul Morson
President	Anisha Phade
Vice President	Taz Ahmed
Secretary	Janse Barkley
Treasurer	Jackson Spenner
Social Chairs	Aidan Keefe and David Sun
Academic Chairs	Alex Olguin and Mingyuan Wang
Diversity and Inclusion Chair	Tolu Ogunbomehin
Food and Fireside Chair	Helen Davis and Lili Bannister
Service and Philanthropy Chair	Anavi Prakash
Public Relations (PR) Chair	Greta Cunningham
Enrollment	approx. 300
Location	1865 Sherman Ave; Evanston, IL 60201

Willard Residential College was built as an all-female dormitory in 1938. The dorm was originally named Willard Hall after Frances Willard, a women's suffragist and leader in the temperance movement who served as Northwestern's first dean of women in the early 1870s. It became the first co-ed housing on campus in 1970, and it was renamed Willard Residential College in 1972 when the dorm became a part of Northwestern's newly inaugurated Residential College program. Willard is the largest residential college at Northwestern University.

Notable Willard fellows include current Faculty Chair Gary Saul Morson. Notable alumni include Shelley Long, Julia Louis-Dreyfus, J. P. Manoux, Seth Meyers, David Schwimmer, Nicole Sullivan, Dave Revsine, Richard Kind, and Stephen Colbert.

== Residence Halls ==
=== 1835 Hinman ===
1835 Hinman Avenue

=== Allison Hall ===
1820 Chicago Avenue.

=== Bobb Residence Hall ===
2305 Sheridan Road

=== Elder Residence Hall ===
2400 Sheridan Road

=== Foster House Residence Hall ===
2253 Sheridan Road This house came under scrutiny after an alcohol-related death of Matthew Sunshine in 2008, a freshman resident.

=== Foster Walker Complex ===
1927 Orrington Ave

=== Goodrich House Residence Hall ===
2321 Sheridan Road

=== Hinman House Residence Hall ===
610 Lincoln Street

=== Interfaith Living and Learning Community ===
Located on the fifth floor of 1835 Hinman, this residence hall is also known as Interfaith Hall.

=== Kemper Residence Hall ===
2420 Campus Drive

=== McCulloch Residence Hall ===
2315 Sheridan Road

=== North Mid-Quads Residence Hall ===
650 Emerson Street, North Mid-Quads (NMQ) houses the Public Affairs Residential College (formerly in 1838 Chicago Ave).

=== Rogers House Residence Hall ===
647 University Place

=== Sargent Residence Hall ===
2245 Sheridan Road

=== Schapiro Hall (Formerly known as 560 Lincoln) ===
560 Lincoln St. Students often refer to it as "Hotel Lincoln", since it is the newest hall and has exceptional common spaces and amenities.

=== South Mid-Quads Residence Hall ===
655 University Place

== Fraternities ==
=== Alpha Epsilon Pi ===
584 Lincoln Street

=== Chi Phi ===
Suspended

=== Chi Psi ===
Suspended

=== Delta Chi ===
619 Colfax Street

=== Delta Tau Delta ===
2317 Sheridan Road

=== Delta Upsilon ===
2307 Sheridan Road

=== Lambda Chi Alpha ===
2339 Sheridan Road

=== Phi Delta Theta ===
2347 Sheridan Road

=== Phi Gamma Delta ===
2331 Sheridan Road

=== Phi Kappa Psi ===
2247 Sheridan Road

=== Pi Kappa Alpha ===
2313 Sheridan Road Website

=== Phi Mu Alpha ===
626 Emerson Street

=== Sigma Alpha Epsilon ===
2325 Sheridan Road (headquarters in Evanston)

=== Sigma Chi ===
2249 Sheridan Road (headquarters in Evanston)

=== Sigma Nu ===
2335 Sheridan Road

=== Sigma Phi Epsilon ===
2341 Sheridan Road

=== Theta Chi ===
572 Lincoln Street

=== Zeta Beta Tau ===
576 Lincoln Street

== Sororities ==
=== Alpha Chi Omega ===
637 University Place

=== Alpha Phi ===
701 University Place (headquarters in Evanston)

=== Chi Omega ===
1870 Orrington Avenue

=== Delta Delta Delta ===
625 University Place

=== Delta Gamma ===
618 Emerson Street

=== Delta Zeta ===
717 University Place

=== Gamma Phi Beta ===
640 Emerson Street

=== Kappa Alpha Theta ===
619 University Place

=== Kappa Delta ===
711 University Place

=== Kappa Kappa Gamma ===
1871 Orrington Avenue

=== Pi Beta Phi ===
636 Emerson Street

=== Sigma Alpha Iota ===
720 Emerson Street

=== Zeta Tau Alpha ===
710 Emerson Street
