= University Hall (University of Illinois Chicago) =

Skyscraper in Chicago, Illinois

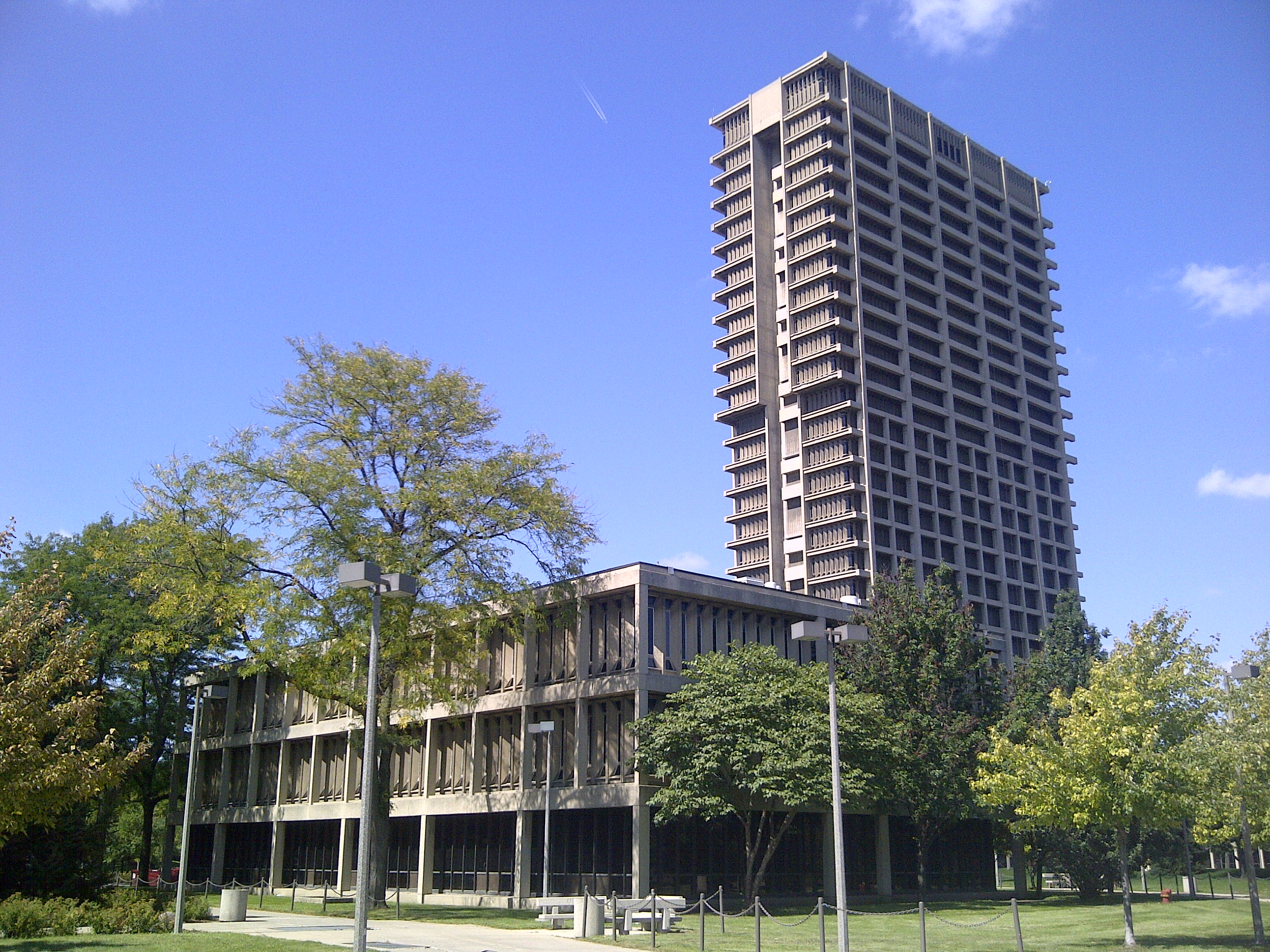
- Interactive map of the University Hall area

General information
- Status: Completed
- Type: Office, education
- Architectural style: Brutalist
- Location: 601 S. Morgan Street; Chicago, Illinois 60607; United States
- Coordinates: 41°52′25.6″N 87°39′3.6″W
- Current tenants: University of Illinois Chicago
- Completed: 1965; 61 years ago
- Owner: University of Illinois Chicago

Height
- Architectural: 338 ft (103 m)

Technical details
- Floor count: 28

Design and construction
- Architects: Skidmore, Owings and Merrill; Walter Netsch

University Hall is the seat of the University of Illinois Chicago administration. Located at 601 S. Morgan Street, it is 338 feet (103 m) tall, making it the tallest building on Chicago's West Side. An unusual feature of its design is that instead of setbacks, it actually widens in two stages, so that it is twenty feet (6.1 m) wider at the top floor than at its base.

== History ==
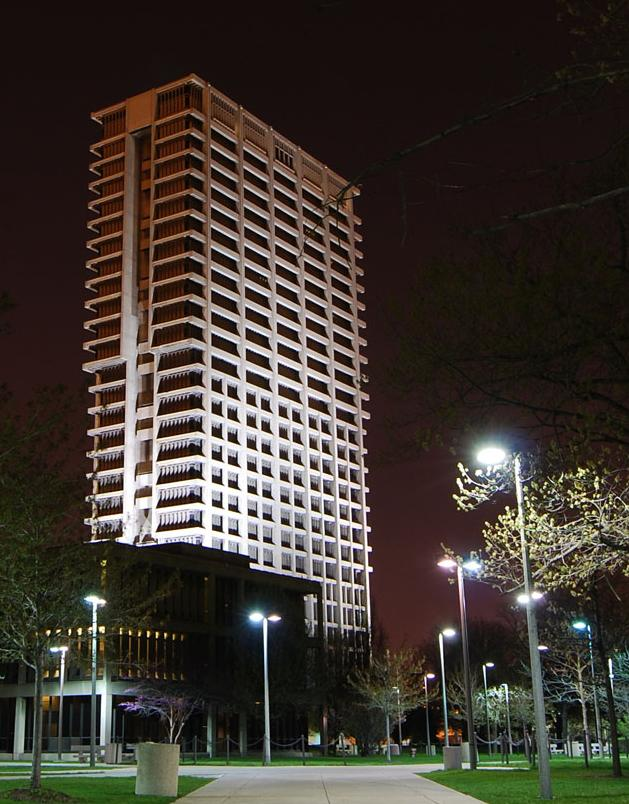
University Hall (in the skyline) at dusk in December

University Hall was designed in the Brutalist style, along with much of the rest of the east campus (formerly "Circle Campus"), by Walter Netsch of Skidmore, Owings and Merrill. The offices of the university chancellor are located on the top floor.

The first two floors are occupied by the Port Center Cafe, a popular studying spot for students; the south portion of the 2nd floor can be seen near the end of the 2006 film, Stranger than Fiction. The remainder of the floors are used as offices for the university chancellor, College of Liberal Arts and Sciences, certain LAS departments and professors, and the College of Business Administration.

University Hall, or UH as it is popularly referred to, can be seen from miles away and is helpful for new students finding their way around campus.

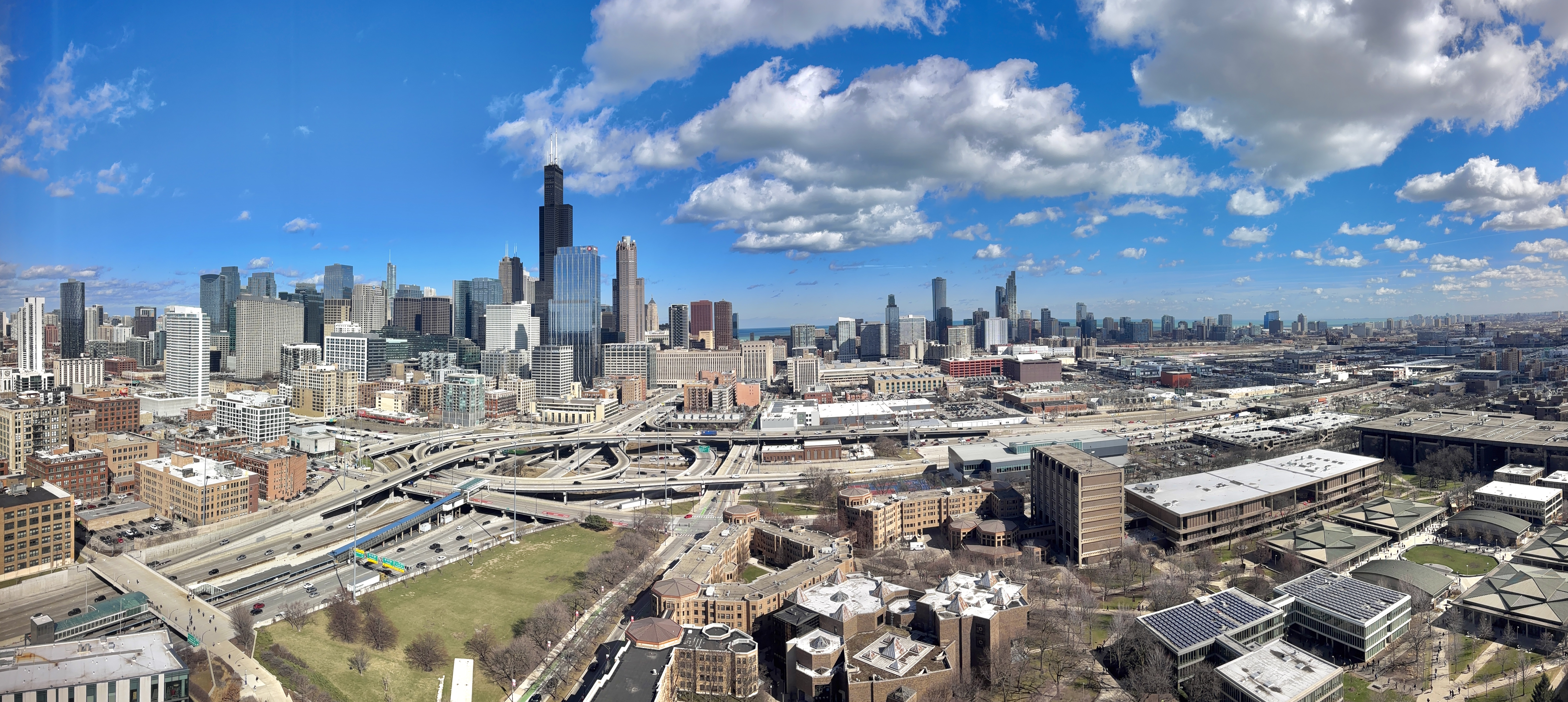
A view of the city skyline from the top floor of University Hall.

== Peregrine falcons ==
Since 1998, a pair of peregrine falcons have nested on a 28th floor ledge of University Hall. The female, named Rosie, has lived and nested there regularly hatching eggs annually. Until 2005, she lived with her mate Joshua; however, Joshua was found wounded in 2005 and, while he was treated, Rosie found a new mate. Since then, she has lived with an unbanded male (nicknamed "The Prof"). The falcons have been popular enough to have been featured in the Chicago Tribune and to have their own webcam.
