= Old College (Northwestern University) =

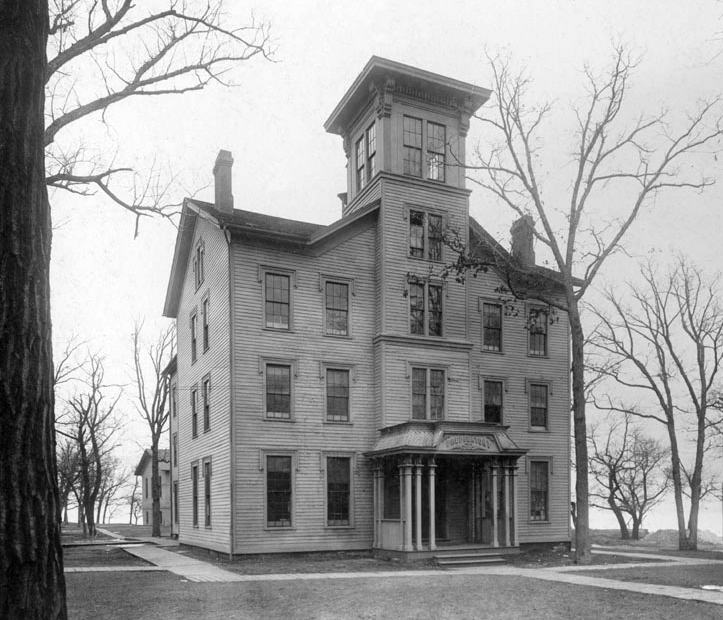
- Old College in 1899, before being moved to make way for Fisk Hall.
- Interactive map of the Old College area

General information
- Location: Evanston, United States
- Coordinates: 42°02′44.5″N 87°40′40.5″W
- Completed: 1855
- Demolished: 1973
- Owner: Northwestern University

Old College was the first building constructed at Northwestern University in Evanston, Illinois, and was completed in 1855. Although intended to be temporary, it served in various capacities including classrooms, a library, and offices until it was razed after being extensively damaged in 1973.

== Construction and history ==
The cornerstone of the building was laid on June 15, 1855, at what is now the corner of Hinman and Davis streets in Evanston. The three-story frame building was completed by the start of the university's first classes on November 5 of that year at a total cost of $5,937. From its completion, Old College was home to all activities of the new university and originally housed a chapel, classrooms, and rooms for two literary societies. Attic lofts also served as dorm rooms for several students. In 1856, the Board of Trustees met in Old College and appointed a Committee on Library, officially establishing Northwestern's first library in Old College. This remained the main library on campus until the construction of University Hall.

The building was only meant to be temporary, and the first permanent building on campus, University Hall, that was completed in 1869. University Hall then became the principal building on campus, and the new building overtook many of the functions of Old College. In 1871, Old College was moved to a location near the present-day Fisk Hall, and a new wing was added to the structure. Old College was moved again in 1899 to the present-day location of the McCormick-Tribune Center stands, to allow for the construction of Fisk Hall. Despite originally being built as a temporary structure, Old College continued to serve a variety of purposes throughout its history, including housing Northwestern's prep school (later known as the Evanston Academy), a weather observatory for the Department of War in the 1870s, a naval training program during World War I, and the offices of the College of Liberal Arts. When the School of Education was established in 1925–26, Old College became the Education Building.

== Razing ==
On July 24, 1973, Old College was struck by lightning, triggering the sprinkler system, which flooded the building. The damage was extensive and the building was razed, after its structure was determined to be unsafe and the estimated $500,000 cost to renovate and restore the building was deemed to be too high. The sign reading "Old College" that hung above the building's entrance is now located at the west entrance of University Hall.
