= The Rock (Northwestern University) =

Boulder in Northwestern University, Illinois, U.S.

Coordinates: 42.051565°N 87.675922°W

The Rock on December 31, 2007

The Rock is a boulder on the campus of Northwestern University in Evanston, Illinois, between University Hall and Harris Hall. It functions as a student-painted billboard for announcing campus groups, events, and messages, and has been repeatedly repainted in various colors and designs over the years.

== History ==
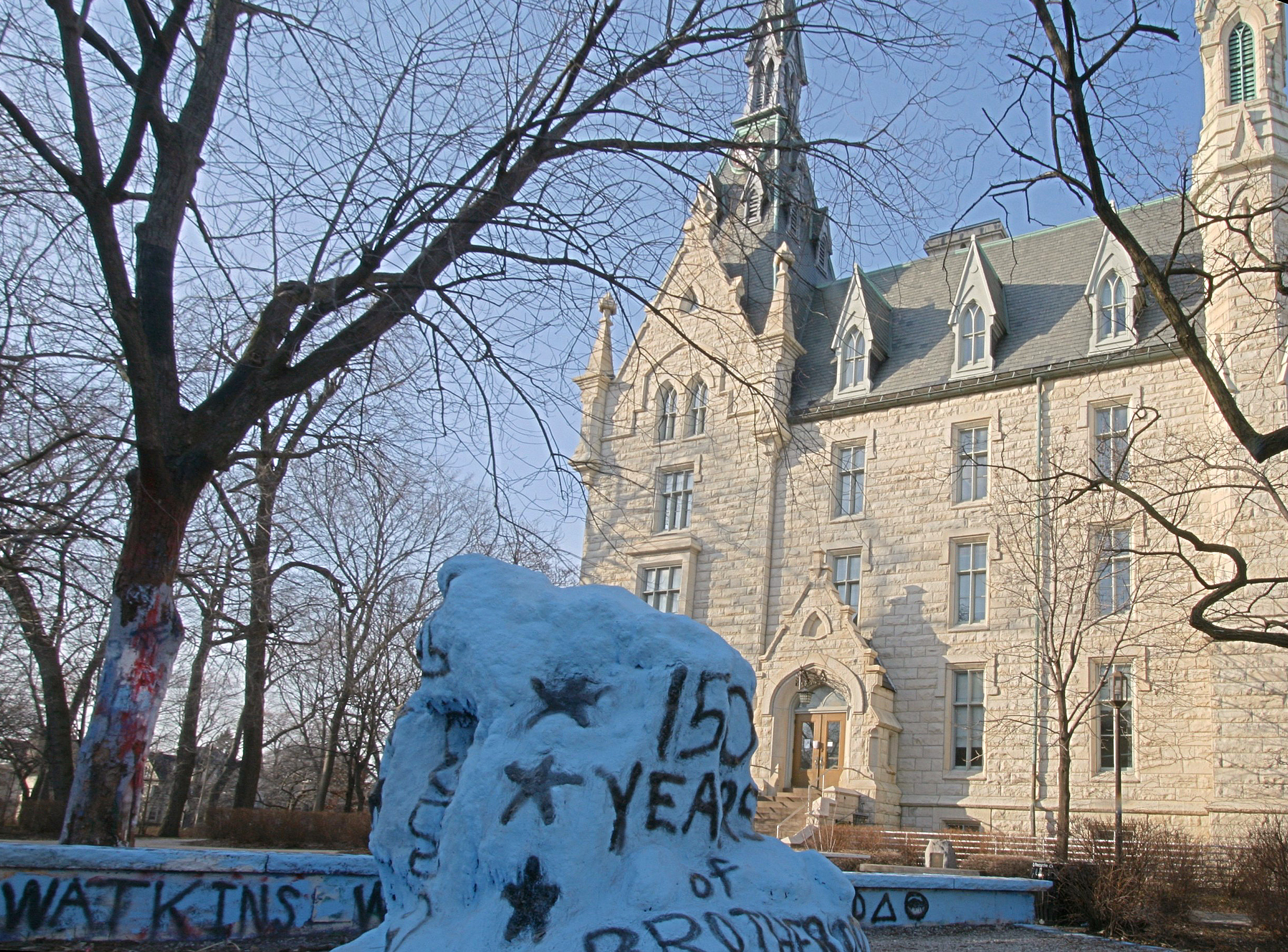
The rock in 2009

The Rock, a purple-and-white quartzite boulder, was transplanted from Devil's Lake, Wisconsin, as a gift of the class of 1902. That graduating class liked the idea of running water on campus "in some form or another" and rigged the Rock to make a fountain on the south end of campus. The original plumbing was later refitted into a water fountain.

Over time, vandalism of the Rock gradually increased, particularly during the Vietnam War. With the first painting of the rock in the 1940s, it became a canvas for student art, opinions, advertising, messages, proposals, and jokes. By tradition, students who wish to paint something on the Rock often guard it from sunrise until the early morning hours before painting.

The Rock is no longer one solid piece of quartzite. In 1989 the Rock was moved about 20 feet to accommodate new landscaping, and the work crew moving the Rock dropped it, splitting it up one side and crumbling part of the base. Scientists at McCormick School of Engineering and Applied Science provided an epoxy to patch the Rock together again.

== In popular culture ==
Author Bob Wood discusses The Rock in the Northwestern chapter of his 1989 book Big Ten Country.

== See also ==
- List of individual rocks
