= Walter Netsch =

American architect

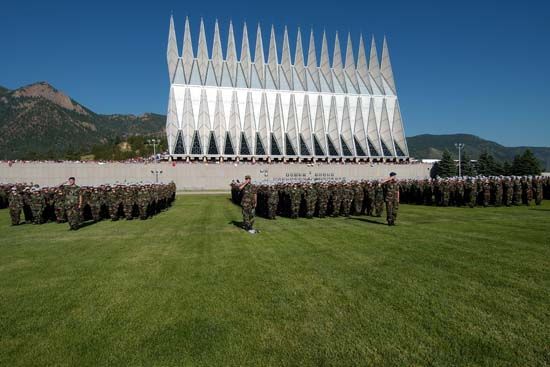
Netsch was the chief architect for the U.S. Air Force Academy, including the distinctive Cadet Chapel, seen here

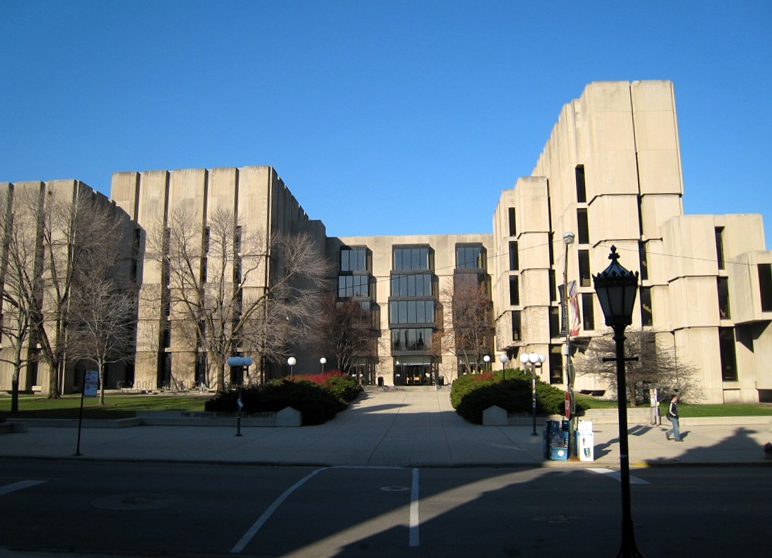
The Regenstein Library at the University of Chicago is one of Walter Netsch's designs.

Walter A. Netsch (February 23, 1920 – June 15, 2008) was an American architect based in Chicago. He was most closely associated with the brutalist style of architecture as well as with the firm of Skidmore, Owings & Merrill. His signature aesthetic is known as Field Theory and is based on rotating squares into complex shapes. He was the lead designer for the United States Air Force Academy in Colorado Springs, Colorado and its famous Cadet Chapel. The Cadet Area at the Academy was named a National Historic Landmark in 2004. He was a fellow of the American Institute of Architects.

== Overview ==
After graduating from The Leelanau School, a boarding school in Michigan, Netsch studied at the Massachusetts Institute of Technology, and then enlisted in the United States Army Corps of Engineers. He earned his bachelor of architecture from the Massachusetts Institute of Technology in 1943 and began his career as an architect working for L. Morgan Yost in Kenilworth, Illinois. In 1947, he joined Skidmore, Owings and Merrill, which initially assigned him to work in Oak Ridge, Tennessee. Later he became a partner for design in SOM and remained with the firm until 1979. He began his own practice in 1981.

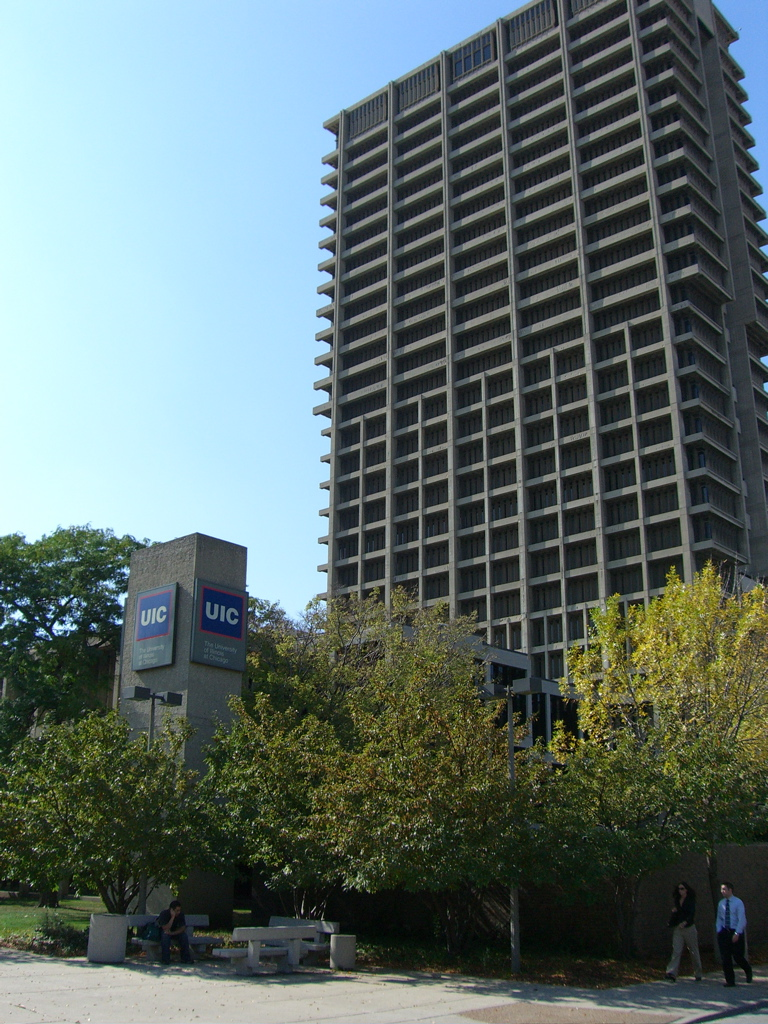
University Hall at the University of Illinois at Chicago, part of Netsch's original design for the Chicago Circle campus.

Following his work on the Air Force Academy, Netsch led the team which designed the original University of Illinois Circle Campus. The campus design grouped buildings into functional clusters and now constitutes most of the east campus buildings at the University of Illinois at Chicago. During his career, Netsch designed 15 libraries, as well as academic buildings for colleges and universities in the United States and Japan, including Northwestern University, Miami University, Wells College, two buildings at Illinois Institute of Technology's main campus, Sophia University, Texas Christian University, University of Chicago, and University of Iowa. He did the initial design for the Inland Steel Building in Chicago; built circa 1956-1957, this was the first skyscraper built in the Chicago Loop after the Great Depression. He also designed the east wing of the Art Institute of Chicago. Netsch designed several buildings at Northwestern University and the campus and buildings of Montgomery College in Takoma Park, Maryland, and was the focus of an exhibit at the Northwestern University Library in February–March 2006 as well as a monograph, Walter A. Netsch, FAIA: A Critical Appreciation and Sourcebook, published in May 2008.

== Recognition ==
Netsch taught at several universities, received numerous awards and honorary degrees, and served as a trustee at the Rhode Island School of Design and a member of the Board of Governors at Northwestern University Library. From 1986 to 1989, he served as Commissioner of the Chicago Park District, appointed by Mayor Harold Washington. He was elected to the College of Fellows of the American Institute of Architects in 1967. He was affiliated with the Art Institute of Chicago and the Landmarks Preservation Council of Illinois. He served on the U.S. Commission of Fine Arts from 1980 to 1985. In 1995, Netsch was interviewed for the Chicago Architects Oral History Project.

Netsch was a collector and patron of the arts, along with his wife, Illinois politician Dawn Clark Netsch, whom he married in 1963. The couple's art collection has been exhibited several times.

Netsch maintained a private consulting practice and was viewed as a mentor by many architects.
