= Theatre & Interpretation Center =

Coordinates: 42°3′7″N 87°40′22″W

Virginia Wadsworth Wirtz Center for the Performing Arts
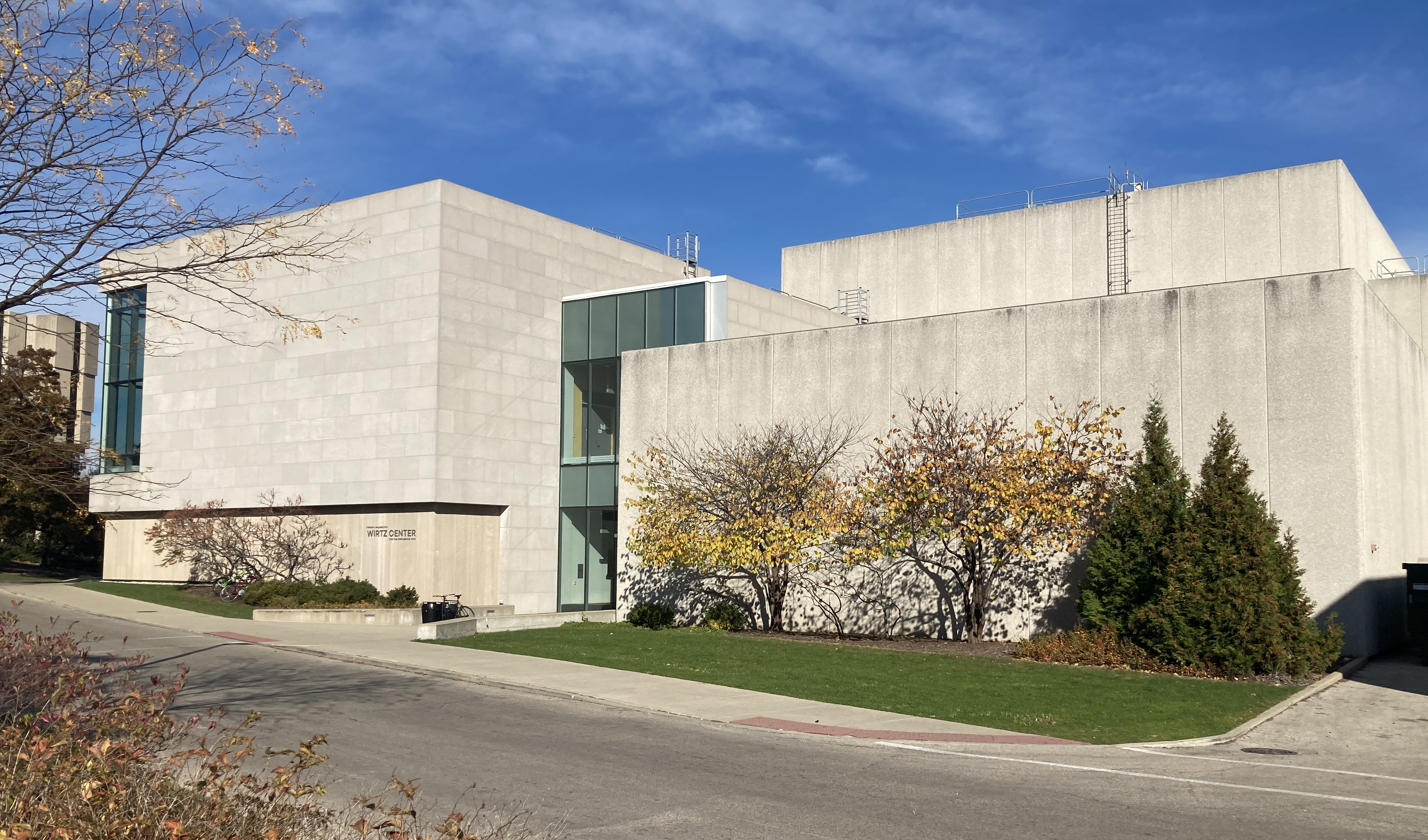
- Interactive map of Virginia Wadsworth Wirtz Center for the Performing Arts
- Former names: Northwestern University Theatre & Interpretation Center

The Northwestern University Virginia Wadsworth Wirtz Center for the Performing Arts exists as a for-profit operational and administrative body in association with the Northwestern University School of Communication with the specific charge of producing, managing, funding and administering the performing arts productions of the School of Communication, Department of Theatre and Department of Performance Studies, including programmatic responsibility for theatre, music theatre and dance. The Theatre and Interpretation Center was built in 1980, and renamed in 2015 to the Virginia Wadsworth Wirtz Center for the Performing Arts. The building contains a 450-seat thrust stage theater (Ethel M. Barber Theater), a 350-seat proscenium theater (the Josephine Louis Theater), two smaller black box theaters, a dance performance space, full theatrical production facilities, and offices for the center. Its plain white exterior walls and boxy, utilitarian shape stand in stark contrast to the nearby University Library, and earned it the nickname "The Box The Library Came In" among Northwestern students.

== Productions ==
Each year, as many as forty productions are mounted in the Wirtz Center. Of those forty, approximately eight are main stage productions staged in the Ethel M. Barber Theater and the Josephine Louis Theater and are directed by faculty, third-year MFA directing students, and guest artists. These productions include both classic and contemporary plays, dance performances and musical productions. In addition, the Wirtz Center produces the annual Waa-Mu Show, an original student written and performed musical and also the Summerfest which includes a two to three play series that is performed during the summer. The center offers subscriptions for the entire season as well as for Summerfest. Currently there are over fifteen hundred subscribers who buy the season package. These patrons come from the University population as well as the neighboring communities.
