= Northwestern University =

University in Evanston, Illinois, US

- Motto: Quaecumque sunt vera (Latin); On seal: Ὁ Λόγος πλήρης χάριτος καὶ ἀληθείας (Greek)
- Motto in English: "Whatsoever things are true" (Philippians 4:8 AV) "The Word full of grace and truth" (John 1:14)
- Type: Private research university
- Established: January 28, 1851; 175 years ago
- Accreditation: HLC
- Academic affiliations: AAU; COFHE; IAMSCU; NAICU; URA; Space-grant
- Endowment: $15.3 billion (2025)
- Budget: $3.3 billion (2024) (excluding the health system)
- President: Mung Chiang
- Provost: Erik Luijten
- Faculty: 4,018 (fall 2021)
- Students: 22,801 (fall 2023)
- Undergraduates: 8,846 (fall 2023)
- Postgraduates: 13,955 (fall 2023)
- Location: Evanston, Illinois, United States; 42°03′21″N 87°40′29″W
- Campus: 240 acres (97 ha); Small city
- Other campuses: Chicago; Coral Gables; San Francisco; Washington, D.C.; Doha
- Newspaper: The Daily Northwestern
- Colors: Purple and white
- Nickname: Wildcats
- Sporting affiliations: NCAA Division I FBS – Big Ten; CCFC
- Mascot: Willie the Wildcat
- Website: northwestern.edu

Northwestern University (NU) is a private research university in Evanston, Illinois, United States. Established in 1851, it is the oldest chartered university in Illinois. Northwestern was initially affiliated with the Methodist Episcopal Church but later became non-sectarian. Northwestern became a founding member of the Big Ten Conference in 1896 and joined the Association of American Universities in 1917.

Northwestern is composed of eleven undergraduate, graduate, and professional schools in the fields of management, law, journalism, engineering, medicine, and others. As of 2024, the university had an endowment of $15.6 billion, an annual budget of around $3.3 billion, and research funding of over $1 billion. The university fields 19 intercollegiate athletic teams, the Northwestern Wildcats, which compete in the NCAA Division I in the Big Ten Conference.

As of September 2026, 39 Nobel Prize laureates and 2 Fields Medalists were affiliated with Northwestern as alumni or faculty. In addition, Northwestern has been associated with 53 Pulitzer Prize winners, 23 National Medal of Science winners, 11 National Humanities Medal recipients, 23 MacArthur Fellows, 20 Rhodes Scholars, and 28 Marshall Scholars. Northwestern alumni also include 10 living billionaires, 2 U.S. Supreme Court justices, and 25 Olympic medalists.

== History ==
=== Founding and early years ===
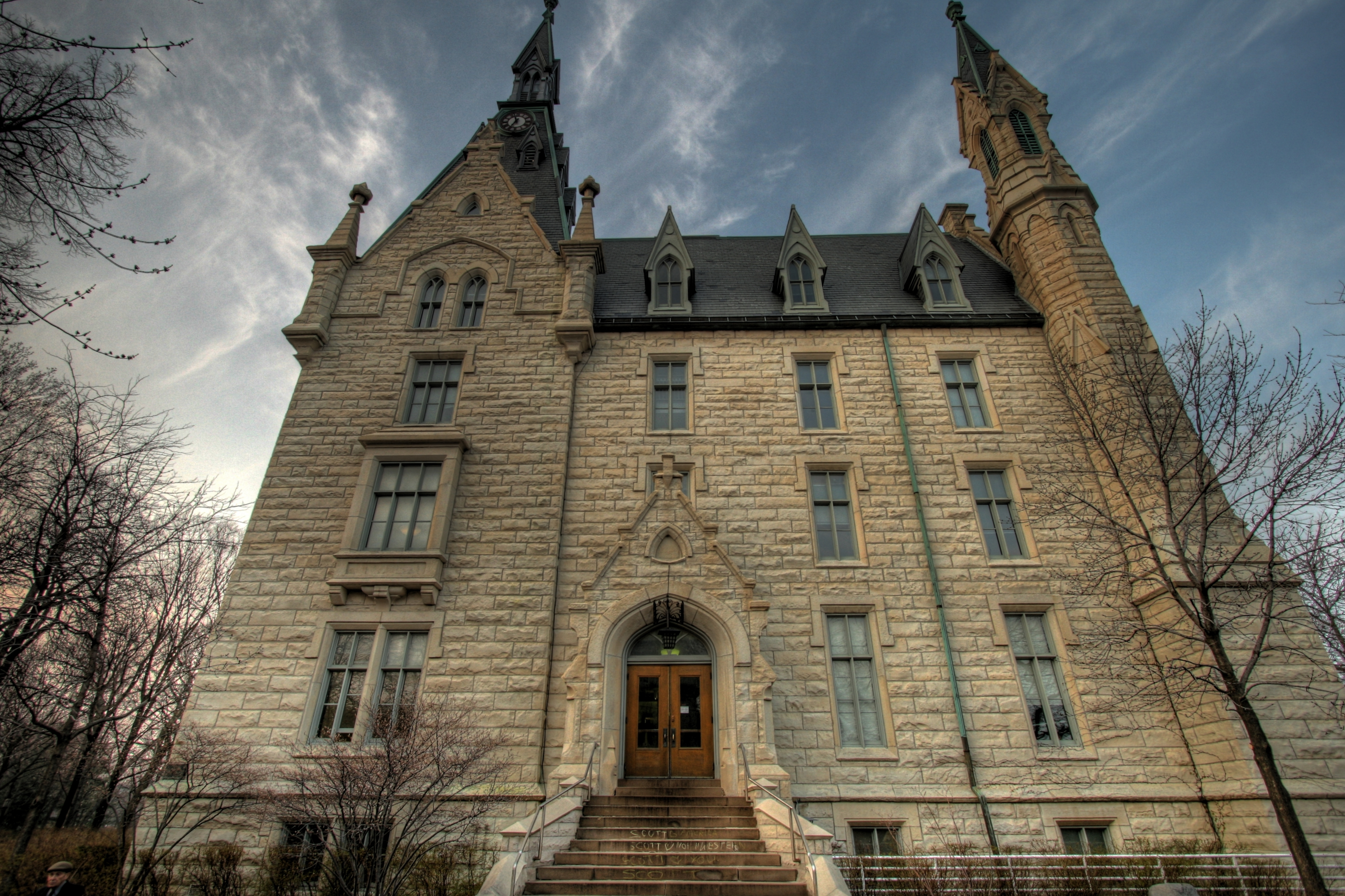
University Hall (1869), the oldest building still standing on campus

The foundation of Northwestern University can be traced to a meeting on May 31, 1850, of nine prominent Chicago businessmen, Methodist leaders, and attorneys who had formed the idea of establishing a university to serve what had been known from 1787 to 1803 as the Northwest Territory. On January 28, 1851, the Illinois General Assembly granted a charter to the Trustees of the North-Western University, making it the first chartered university in Illinois. The school's nine founders, all of whom were Methodists (three of them ministers), knelt in prayer and worship before launching their first organizational meeting. Although they affiliated the university with the Methodist Episcopal Church, they favored a non-sectarian admissions policy, believing that Northwestern should serve all people in the newly developing territory by bettering the economy in Evanston.

John Evans, for whom Evanston is named, bought 379 acres (153 ha) of land along Lake Michigan in 1853, and Philo Judson developed plans for what would become the city of Evanston, Illinois. The first building, Old College, opened on November 5, 1855. To raise funds for its construction, Northwestern sold $100 "perpetual scholarships" entitling the purchaser and his heirs to free tuition. Another building, University Hall, was built in 1869 of the same Joliet limestone as the Chicago Water Tower, also built in 1869, one of the few buildings in the heart of Chicago to survive the Great Chicago Fire of 1871.

In 1873, Evanston College for Ladies merged with Northwestern. Frances Willard, who later gained fame as a suffragette and as one of the founders of the Woman's Christian Temperance Union, became the school's first dean of women (Willard Residential College, built in 1938, honors her name). Northwestern admitted its first female students in 1869, and the first woman graduated in 1874. The first African-American woman to graduate from the university was Emma Ann Reynolds, earning a doctor of medicine (M.D.) degree in 1895.

Northwestern fielded its first intercollegiate football team in 1882, later becoming a founding member of the Big Ten Conference. In the 1870s and 1880s, Northwestern affiliated itself with already existing schools of law, medicine, and dentistry in Chicago. As the university's enrollments grew, these professional schools were integrated with the undergraduate college in Evanston. The result was a modern research university combining professional, graduate, and undergraduate programs, which gave equal weight to teaching and research.

=== 20th century ===
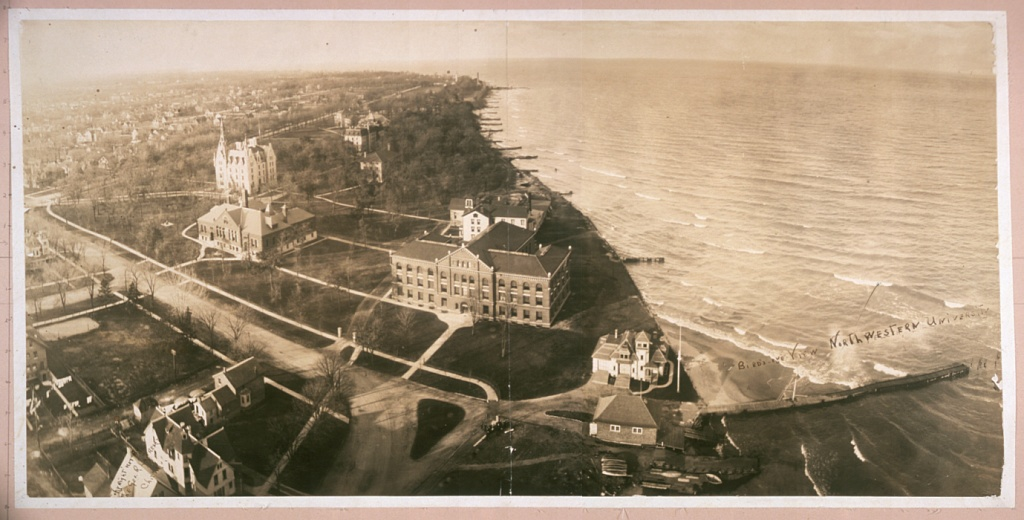
A postcard of Northwestern University from 1907

By the turn of the century, Northwestern had grown in stature to become the third-largest university in the United States after Harvard University and the University of Michigan. Under Walter Dill Scott's presidency from 1920 to 1939, Northwestern began construction of an integrated campus in Chicago designed by James Gamble Rogers, noted for his Collegiate Gothic architecture, to house the professional schools. In addition, James Gamble Rogers designed a library in accordance with the gothic architectural style on the Evanston campus in order to make use of the $1 million donated to the school after the death of Charles Deering. This library is named in memory of him and its design was inspired by Cambridge University's King's College Chapel. The university also established the Kellogg School of Management and built several prominent buildings on the Evanston campus, including Dyche Stadium, now named Ryan Field, among others. In the 1920s, Northwestern became one of the first six universities in the United States to establish a Naval Reserve Officers Training Corps (NROTC). In 1939, Northwestern hosted the first-ever NCAA Division I men's basketball championship game in the original Patten Gymnasium, which was later demolished and relocated farther north, along with the Dearborn Observatory, to make room for the Technological Institute.

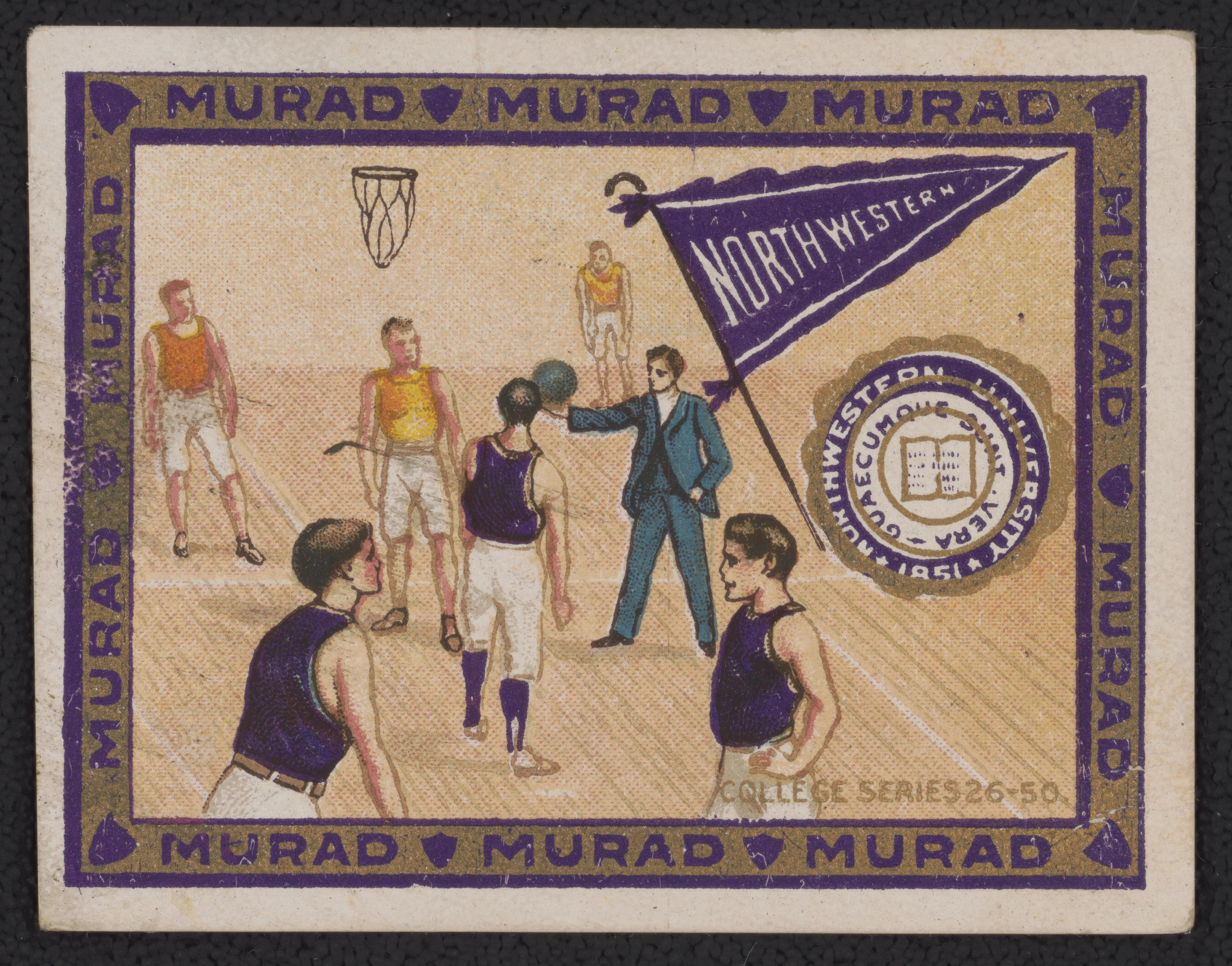
A chromolithograph of the school's basketball team, 1910

After the golden years of the 1920s, the Great Depression in the United States (1929–1941) had a severe impact on the university's finances. Its annual income dropped 25 percent from $4.8 million in 1930–31 to $3.6 million in 1933–34. Investment income shrank, fewer people could pay full tuition, and annual giving from alumni and philanthropists fell from $870,000 in 1932 to a low of $331,000 in 1935. The university responded with two salary cuts of 10 percent each for all employees. It imposed hiring and building freezes and slashed appropriations for maintenance, books, and research. Having had a balanced budget in 1930–31, the university now faced deficits of roughly $100,000 for the next four years. Enrollments fell in most schools, with law and music suffering the biggest declines. However, the movement toward state certification of school teachers prompted Northwestern to start a new graduate program in education, thereby bringing in new students and much-needed income. In June 1933, Robert Maynard Hutchins, president of the University of Chicago, proposed a merger of the two universities, estimating annual savings of $1.7 million. The two presidents were enthusiastic, and the faculty liked the idea; many Northwestern alumni, however, opposed it, fearing the loss of their alma mater and its many traditions that distinguished Northwestern from Chicago. The medical school, for example, was oriented toward training practitioners, and alumni feared it would lose its mission if it were merged into the more research-oriented University of Chicago Medical School. The merger plan was ultimately dropped. In 1935, the Deering family rescued the university budget with an unrestricted gift of $6 million, bringing the budget up to $5.4 million in 1938–39. This allowed many of the previous spending cuts to be restored, including half of the salary reductions.

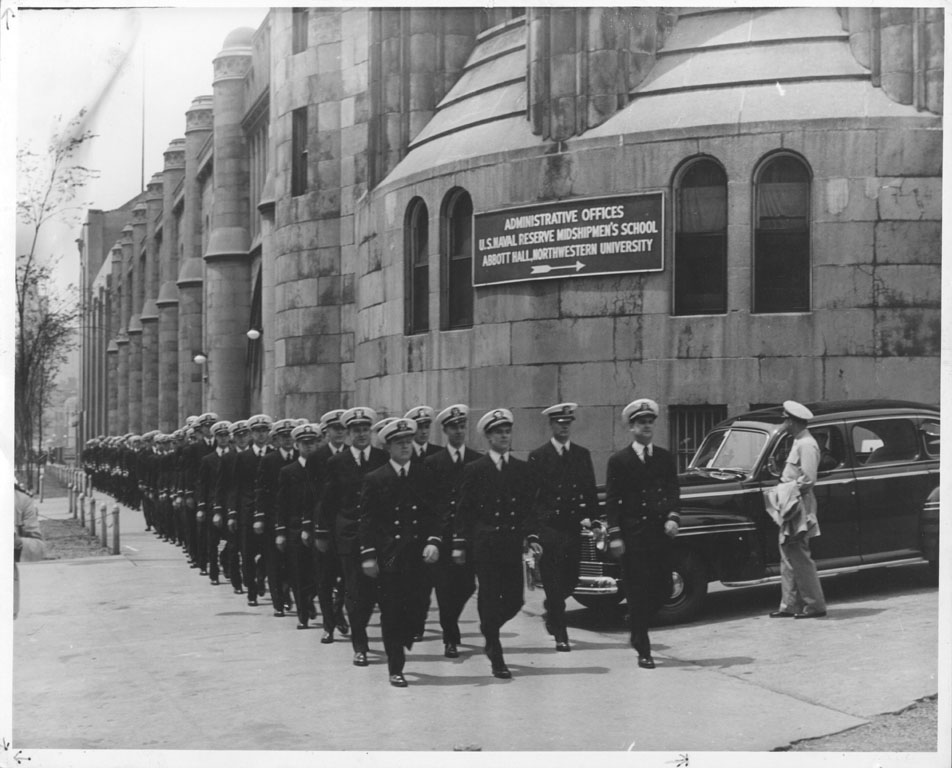
Northwestern's midshipmen school during World War II

Like other American universities, Northwestern was transformed by World War II (1939–1945). Regular enrollment fell dramatically, but the school opened high-intensity, short-term programs that trained over 50,000 military personnel, including future president John F. Kennedy. Northwestern's existing NROTC program proved to be a boon to the university as it trained over 36,000 sailors over the course of the war, which led Northwestern to be called the "Annapolis of the Midwest." Franklyn B. Snyder led the university from 1939 to 1949, and after the war, surging enrollments under the G.I. Bill drove the dramatic expansion of both campuses. In 1948, prominent anthropologist Melville J. Herskovits founded the Program of African Studies at Northwestern, the first center of its kind at an American academic institution.

J. Roscoe Miller's tenure as president from 1949 to 1970 saw an expansion of the Evanston campus, with the construction of the Lakefill on Lake Michigan, growth of the faculty and new academic programs, and polarizing Vietnam-era student protests. In 1978, the first and second Unabomber attacks occurred at Northwestern University. Relations between Evanston and Northwestern became strained throughout much of the post-war era because of episodes of disruptive student activism, disputes over municipal zoning, building codes, and law enforcement, as well as restrictions on the sale of alcohol near campus until 1972. Northwestern's exemption from state and municipal property-tax obligations under its original charter has historically been a source of town-and-gown tension.

Although government support for universities declined in the 1970s and 1980s, President Arnold R. Weber was able to stabilize university finances, which led to a revitalization of its campuses. In 1996, Diana, Princess of Wales visited Northwestern's Evanston and Chicago campuses to raise money for the university hospital's Robert H. Lurie Comprehensive Cancer Center at the invitation of then-President Henry Bienen. Her visit raised a total of $1.5 million for cancer research.

=== 21st century ===
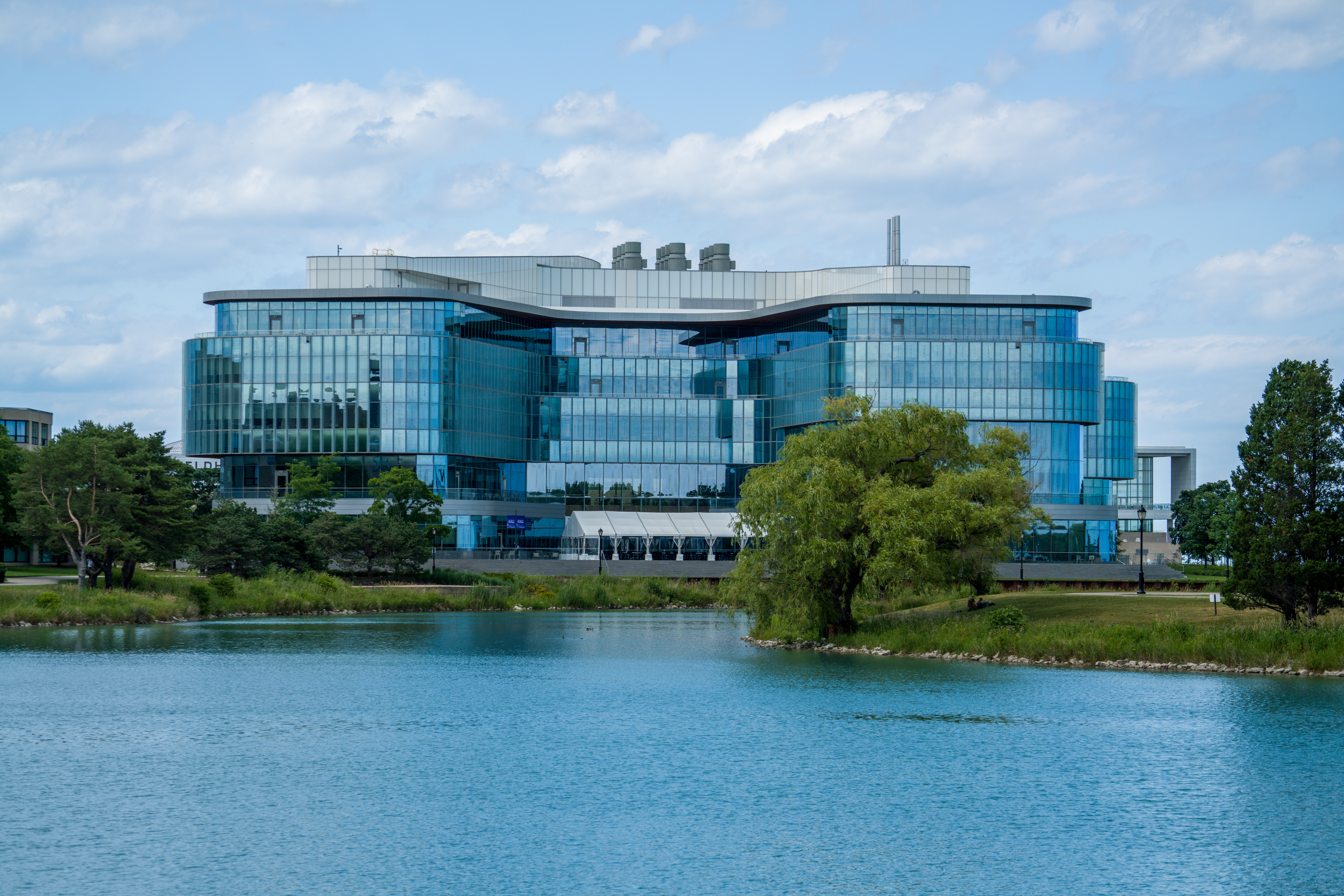
The Kellogg Global Hub was constructed in 2017.

As admissions to colleges and universities grew increasingly competitive in the 1990s and 2000s, President Bienen's tenure saw an increase in the number and quality of undergraduate applicants, continued expansion of the facilities and faculty, and renewed athletic competitiveness.

In the 2010s, a five-year capital campaign resulted in a new music center, a replacement building for the business school, and a $270 million athletic complex. In 2014, President Barack Obama delivered a seminal economics speech at the Evanston campus. In 2015, Queen Máxima and King Willem-Alexander of the Netherlands visited Northwestern to announce research collaborations between Northwestern and several Dutch institutions focused on the study of aging. In 2021, an additional $480 million, the largest donation in the university's history, was donated to Northwestern by the Ryan Family to be applied to research at the Kellogg School of Management and Feinberg School of Medicine, as well as for renovating Ryan Field. In a partnership with Oakton College and the Illinois Department of Corrections in 2023, Northwestern became the first top-ranked university in the United States to award bachelor's degrees to a graduating class of prisoners.

In April 2024, Northwestern University students joined other campuses across the United States in protests against the Gaza war. The student protestors demanded divestment from companies with ties to Israel and that the administration protect freedom of speech, civil rights and be transparent with their investments moving forward. The university administration came to an agreement with the protestors, now known as the Deering Meadow agreement, which permitted peaceful demonstrations, gave students representation on an investment committee and pledged to bring Palestinian students to campus. In February 2025, Leo Terrell, the head of the Trump administration's Task Force to Combat Antisemitism, announced that he would investigate Northwestern University as part of the Department of Justice's broader investigation into antisemitism on college campuses.

On November 29, 2025, Northwestern University announced that it had reached an agreement with the Trump administration to restore hundreds of millions of dollars in federal research funding that had been frozen amid investigations into alleged antisemitism and civil rights violations. Under the deal, the university will pay the federal government $75 million over three years and implement changes to student conduct policies, and federal investigations into the school will be ended; the university stated that the settlement does not constitute an admission of wrongdoing.

Northwestern University also agreed to several political demands by the Trump administration, including to implement certain anti-transgender policies. According to Northwestern experts cited in an article on the university's website in January of the same year, the Trump administration's anti-transgender policies are based on misinformation, are 'patriarchal and transphobic, lack legal standing, and exacerbate violence and discrimination against the trans community. The university also agreed to terminate the 2024 Deering Meadow agreement they had previously negotiated with pro- Palestinian student activists.

On May 18, 2026, Mung Chiang was named as Northwestern's 18th president and began his presidency on July 1, 2026.

== Campuses ==
=== Evanston ===
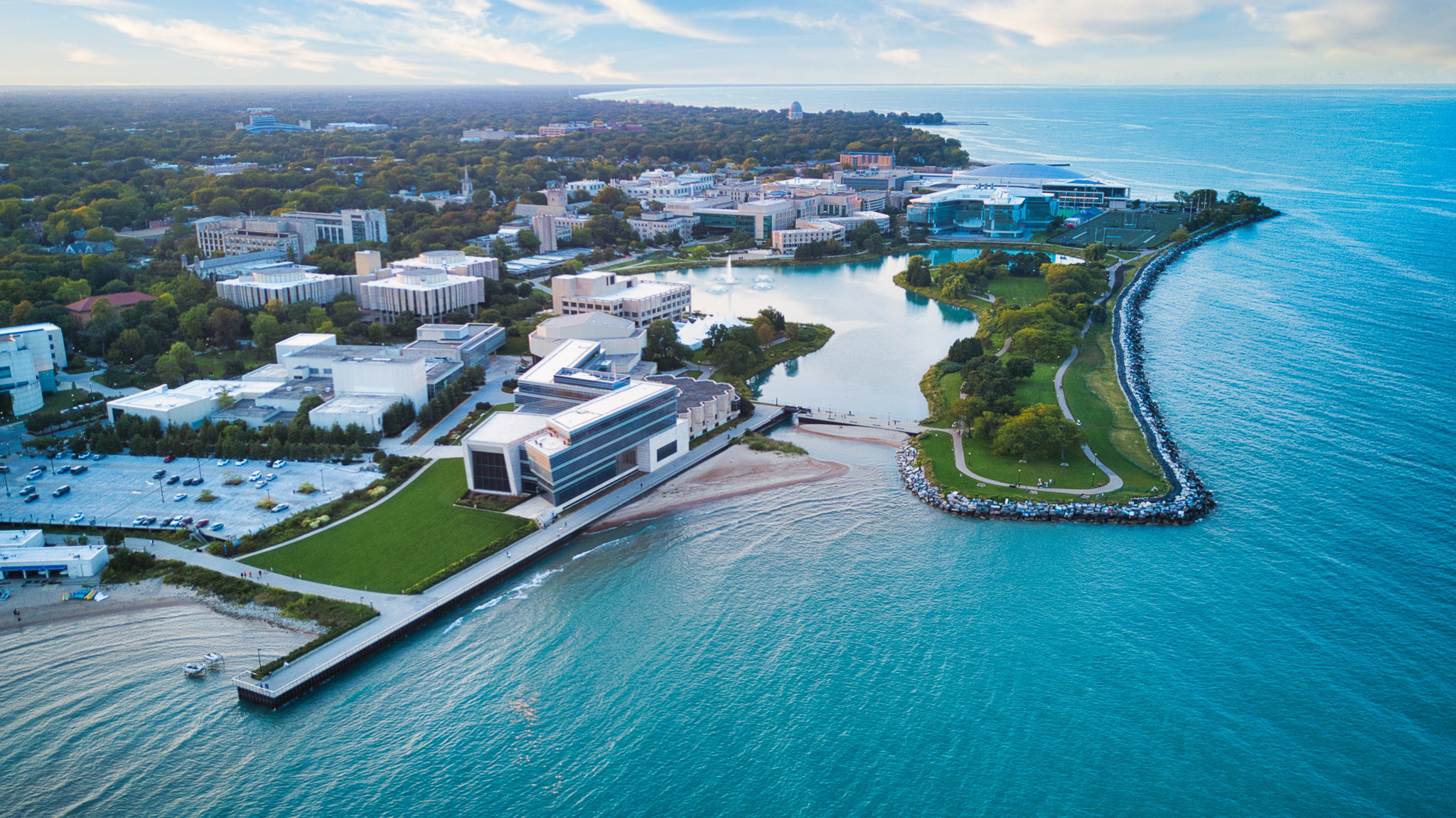
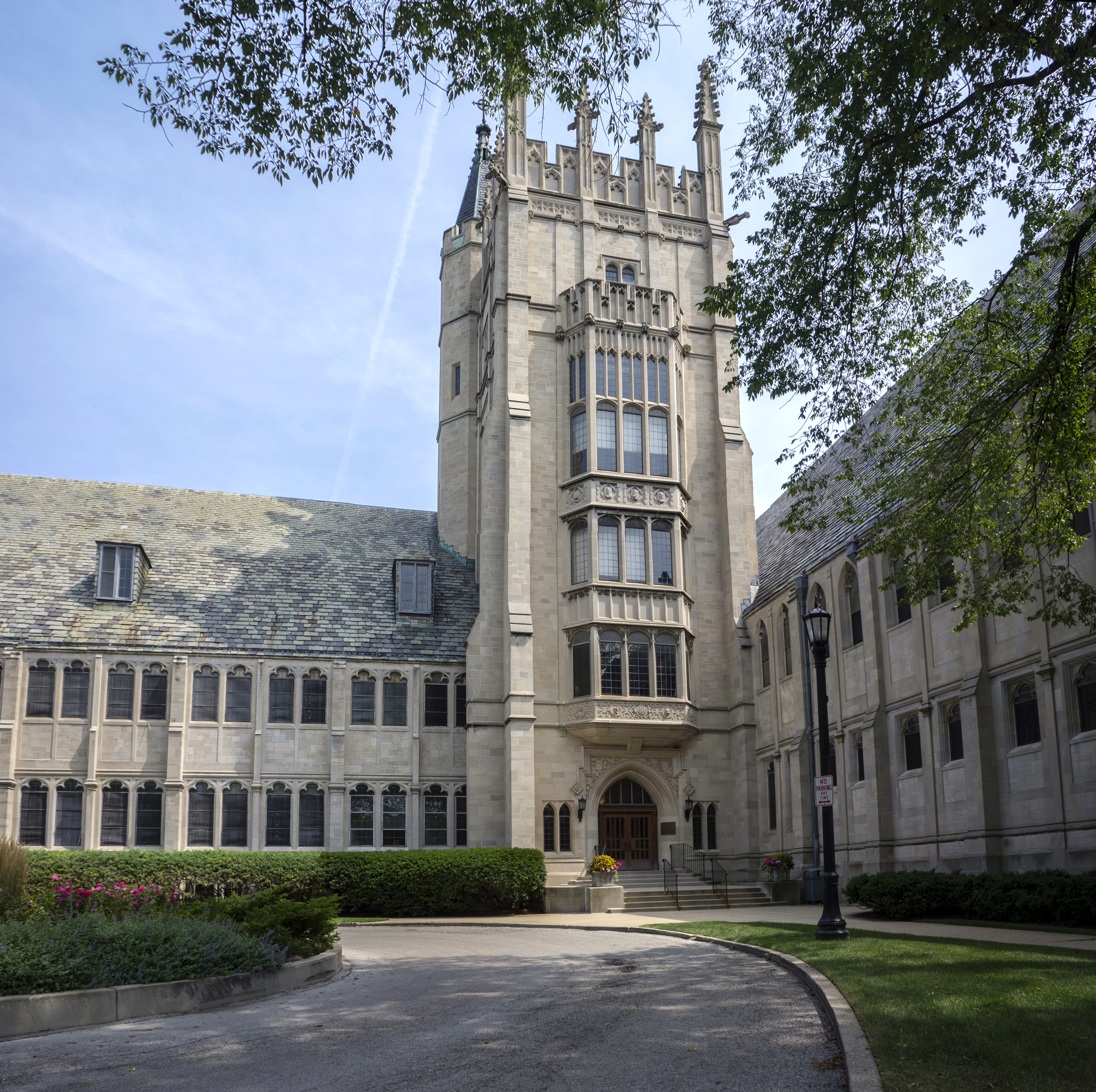
Aerial photograph of Northwestern University from Lake Michigan (left) and the Garrett–Evangelical Theological Seminary (right) on campus

Northwestern's main campus is on the shore of Lake Michigan in the Chicago metropolitan area. The campus spans an area of 240 acres and is characterized by its blend of modern and historic gothic architecture.

Northwestern's Evanston campus, where the undergraduate schools, the Graduate School, and the Kellogg School of Management are located, runs north–south from Lincoln Avenue to Clark Street west of Lake Michigan along Sheridan Road. North Campus is home to the fraternity quads, athletics facilities including the Henry Crown Sports Pavilion and Norris Aquatics Center, the Technological Institute, Dearborn Observatory, the Patrick G. and Shirley W. Ryan Hall for Nanofabrication and Molecular Self-Assembly, and the Ford Motor Company Engineering Design Center among others. South Campus is home to the university's humanities buildings, music buildings like the Pick-Staiger Concert Hall, the Mary and Leigh Block Museum of Art, and the sorority quads. In the 1960s, the university created an additional 84 acres (34 ha) for the campus by filling in a portion of Lake Michigan. Buildings located on the resulting Lakefill include University Library, the Patrick G. and Shirley W. Ryan Center for the Musical Arts, the Regenstein Hall of Music, Norris University Center (the student union), the Kellogg School of Management Global Hub, and various athletics facilities.

The Chicago Transit Authority's elevated train running through Evanston is called the Purple Line, taking its name from Northwestern's school color. The Foster and Davis stations are within walking distance of the southern end of the campus, while the Noyes station is close to the northern end of the campus. The Central station is close to Ryan Field, Northwestern's football stadium. The Evanston Davis Street station serves the Northwestern campus in downtown Evanston and the Evanston Central Street station is near Ryan Field. Pace Suburban Bus Service and the CTA have several bus routes that run through or near the Evanston campus.

=== Chicago ===
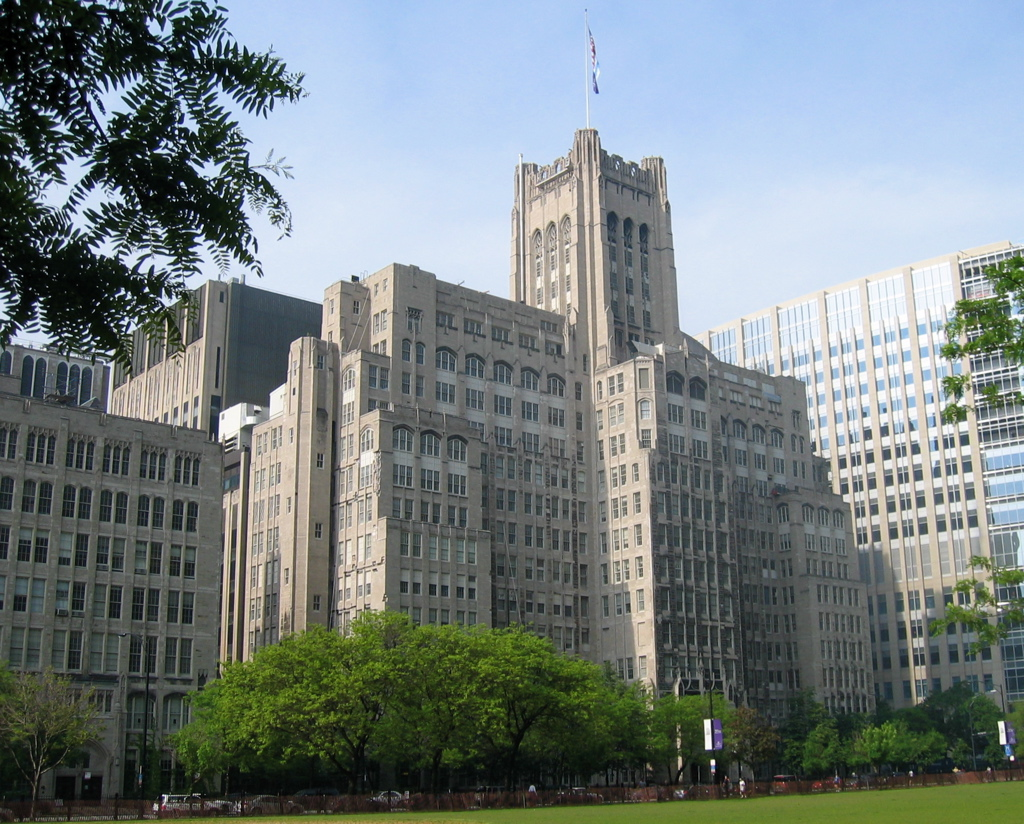
The Feinberg School of Medicine in Chicago

Northwestern's Chicago campus is located in the city's Streeterville neighborhood near Lake Michigan. The Chicago campus is home to the nationally ranked Northwestern Memorial Hospital, the medical school, the law school, the part-time MBA program, and the School of Professional Studies. Medill's one-year graduate program rents a floor on Wacker Drive, across the river from Streeterville and separate from the rest of the campus. Northwestern's professional schools and a number of its affiliated hospitals are located approximately four blocks east of the Chicago station on the CTA Red Line. The Chicago campus is also served by CTA bus routes.

Founded or affiliated at varying points in the university's history, the professional schools originally were scattered throughout Chicago. In connection with a 1917 master plan for a central Chicago campus and President Walter Dill Scott's capital campaign, 8.5 acres (3.44 ha) of land were purchased at the corner of Chicago Avenue and Lake Shore Drive for $1.5 million in 1920. Architect James Gamble Rogers was commissioned to create a master plan for the principal buildings on the new campus, which he designed in collegiate gothic style. In 1923, Mrs. Montgomery Ward donated $8 million to the campaign to finance the construction of the Montgomery Ward Memorial Building, which would house the medical and dental schools, and create endowments for faculty chairs, research grants, scholarships, and building maintenance. The building would become the first university skyscraper in the United States. In addition to the Ward Building, Rogers designed Wieboldt Hall to house facilities for the School of Commerce and Levy Mayer Hall to house the School of Law. The new campus comprising these three new buildings was dedicated during a two-day ceremony in June 1927. The Chicago campus continued to expand with the addition of Thorne Hall in 1931 and Abbott Hall in 1939. In October 2013, Northwestern began the demolition of the architecturally significant Prentice Women's Hospital. Eric G. Neilson, dean of the medical school, penned an op-ed that equated retaining the building with loss of life.

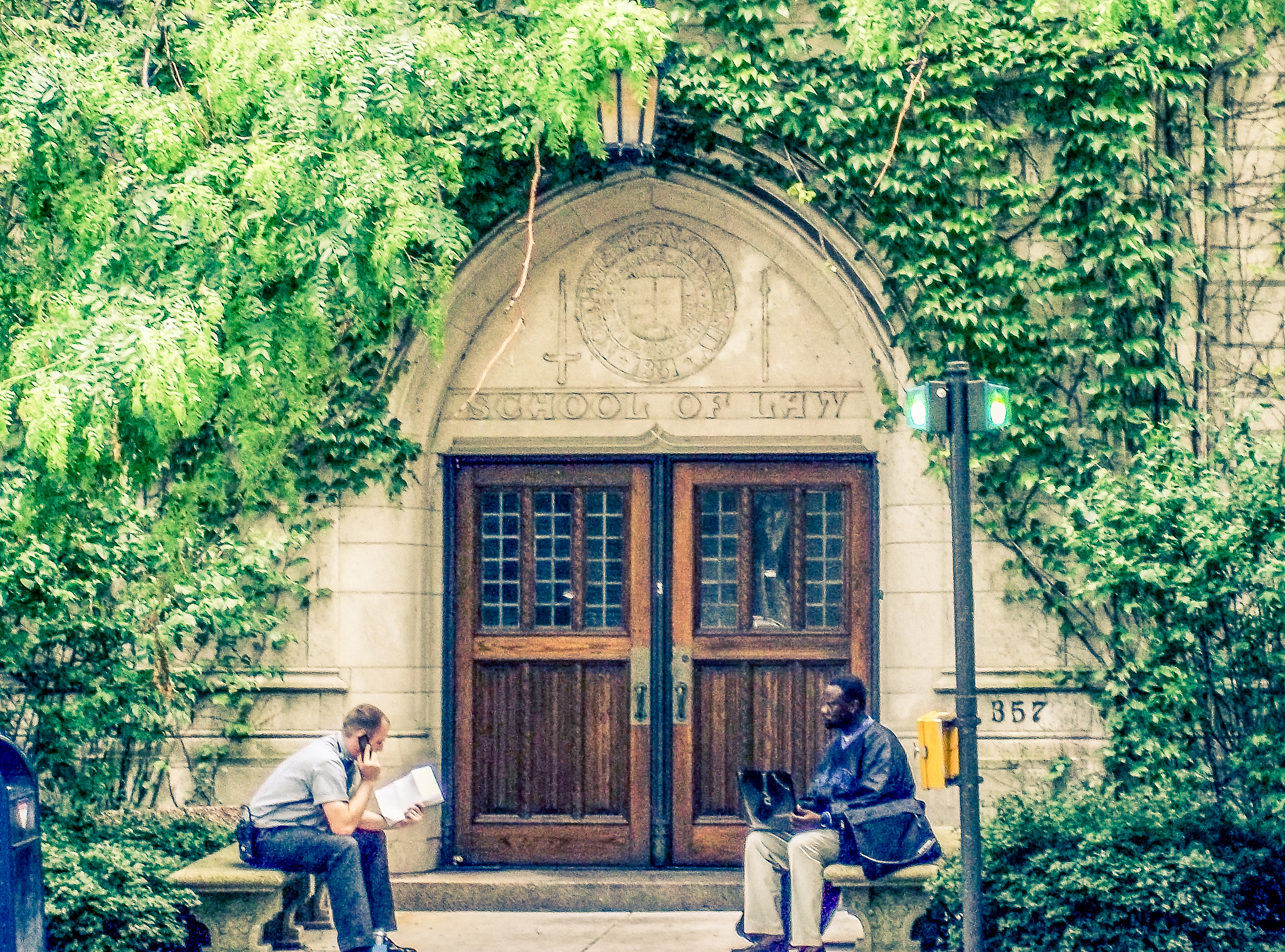
The entrance of Northwestern University Pritzker School of Law's Levy Mayer Hall on the Chicago campus

=== Education City ===
In Fall 2008, Northwestern opened a campus in Education City, Doha, Qatar. Through the Medill School of Journalism and School of Communication, NU-Q offers bachelor's degrees in journalism and communications respectively. However, some have questioned whether NU-Q can truly offer a comparable journalism program to that of its U.S. campus given Qatar's instances of censorship and strict limits on journalistic and academic freedoms. The Qatar Foundation for Education, Science and Community Development, a private charitable institution founded by former emir Sheikh Hamad bin Khalifa Al Thani and his wife and mother of the current emir Sheikha Moza bint Nasser, provided funding for construction and administrative costs, as well as support to hire 50 to 60 faculty and staff, some of whom rotate between the Evanston and Qatar campuses. Northwestern receives roughly $45 million per year to operate the campus. In February 2016, Northwestern reached an agreement with the Qatar Foundation to extend the operations of the NU-Q branch for an additional decade, through the 2027–2028 academic year.

== Organization and administration ==
=== Governance ===
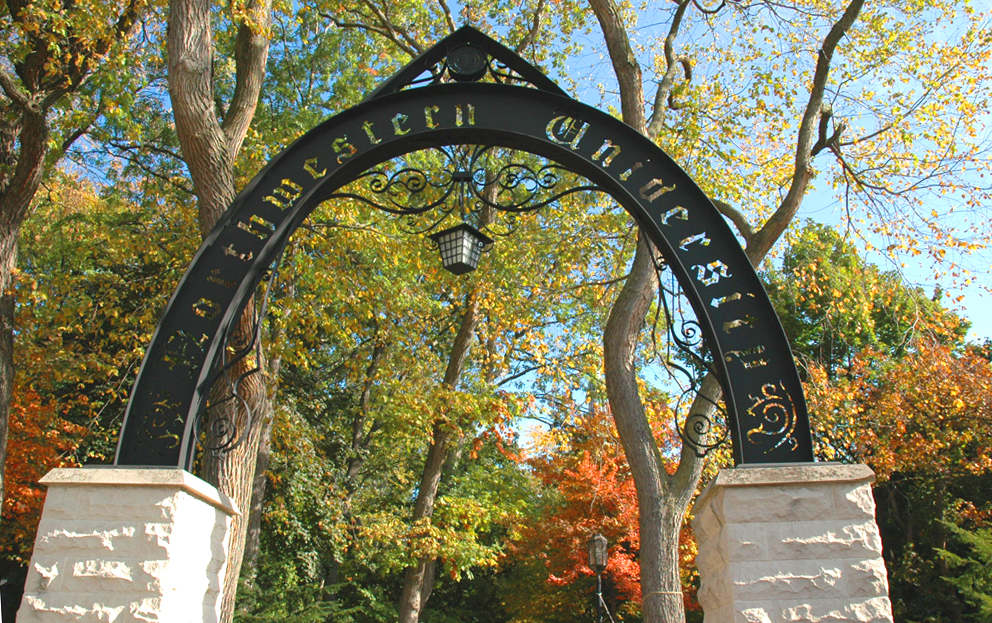
Weber Arch

Northwestern is privately owned and governed by an appointed board of trustees composed of 70 members. The board delegates its power to an elected president who serves as the chief executive officer of the university. Northwestern has had seventeen presidents in its history (excluding interim presidents). The former president, legal scholar Michael Schill, succeeded Morton O. Schapiro in fall 2022. The president maintains a staff of vice presidents, directors, and other assistants for administrative, financial, faculty, and student matters. Erik Luijten assumed the role of provost for the university on July 1, 2026.

Students are formally involved in the university's administration through the Associated Student Government, elected representatives of the undergraduate students, and the Graduate Student Association, which represents the university's graduate students.

The admission requirements, degree requirements, courses of study, and disciplinary and degree recommendations for each of Northwestern's 12 schools are determined by the voting members of that school's faculty (assistant professor and above).

=== Endowment ===
Northwestern maintains an endowment of $14.3 billion, the eighth-largest university endowment among private universities in the United States. The endowment is sustained through donations and is maintained by investment advisers at the university's Investment Office.

== Academics ==
Undergraduate and graduate schools
Evanston Campus
- Weinberg College of Arts and Sciences (1851)
- School of Communication (1878) (Note: First as School of Oratory, then as School of Speech in 1921.)
- Bienen School of Music (1895)
- McCormick School of Engineering (1909)
- Medill School of Journalism (1921)
- School of Education and Social Policy (1926)
- School of Professional Studies (1933)
Graduate and professional
Evanston Campus
- Kellogg School of Management (1908)
- The Graduate School (1910)

Chicago Campus

- Feinberg School of Medicine (1859)
- Kellogg School of Management (1908)
- Pritzker School of Law (1859)
- School of Professional Studies (1933)

=== Admissions ===
Undergraduate admission statistics
	Fall 2025	Fall 2024	Fall 2023	Fall 2022	Fall 2021
First-time Freshmen
Applicants	52,676	49,474	51,769	51,261	47,636
Admits	3,933	3,806	3,739	3,695	3,321
Admit rate	7%	8%	7%	7%	7%
Enrolled	2,139	2,105	2,111	2,038	2,086
Yield rate	54%	55%	56%	55%	63%
Transfers
Applicants	4,562	4,045	3,507	3,264	2,965
Admits	498	484	447	423	387
Admit rate	11%	12%	13%	13%	13%
Enrolled	249	277	237	228	226
Yield rate	50%	57%	53%	54%	58%

Northwestern University's admissions are characterized as "most selective" by U.S. News & World Report. Northwestern received a record 52,225 applications for its class size of approximately 2,100 students in 2022–2023 academic year. For the Class of 2027, regular decision acceptance rate was approximately 4.6%, while overall acceptance rate remained around 7.0%. For the Class of 2026, the interquartile range (middle 50%) on the post-2016 SAT was a combined (verbal and math) 1500–1560 out of 1600; the interquartile range on the evidence-based reading and writing (EBRW) section of the SAT was 730–770 out of 800 while the interquartile range on the Math section of the SAT was 760–800 out of 800. ACT composite scores for the middle 50% ranged from 33 to 35 out of 36, and 96% ranked in the top ten percent of their respective high school classes.

Approximately 35–40% percent of the incoming students of the Class of 2027 have been admitted through the Early Decision application round. Northwestern's early decision admission numbers for the Class of 2027 had an early acceptance rate of about 20%, with approximately 1,000 students being admitted out of 5,220 applications.

In April 2016, Northwestern became one of 15 Illinois universities to sign on to the Chicago Star Partnership, a City Colleges initiative aimed at increasing opportunities for students in the city's public school district. Through this partnership, the university provides scholarships to students who "graduate from Chicago Public Schools, get their associate degree from one of the city's community colleges, and then get admitted to a bachelor's degree program."

The university is need-blind for domestic applicants.

=== Rankings and reputation ===
Academic rankings

National
- Forbes: 15
- U.S. News & World Report: 9 (tie)
- Washington Monthly: 79
- WSJ/College Pulse: 50

Global
- ARWU: 31
- QS: 45 (tie)
- THE: 29 (tie)
- U.S. News & World Report: 26

Northwestern is a large, residential research university.

=== Education ===
The university provides instruction in over 200 formal academic concentrations, 124 undergraduate programs, and 145 graduate and professional programs, including various dual degree programs. Although there is no university-wide core curriculum, a foundation in the liberal arts and sciences, sometimes referred as distribution requirements, are required for all majors; individual degree requirements are set by the faculty of each school. The university heavily emphasizes interdisciplinary learning, with 72% of undergrads combining two or more areas of study. Northwestern's full-time undergraduate and graduate programs operate on an approximately 10-week academic quarter system with the academic year beginning in late September and ending in early June. Under the regular academic calendar, each quarter contains a four-day Reading Period between the end of classes and the beginning of finals. Undergraduates typically take four courses each quarter and twelve courses in an academic year and are required to complete at least twelve quarters on campus to graduate. Northwestern offers honors, accelerated, and joint degree programs in medicine, science, mathematics, engineering, and journalism. The comprehensive doctoral graduate program has high coexistence with undergraduate programs.

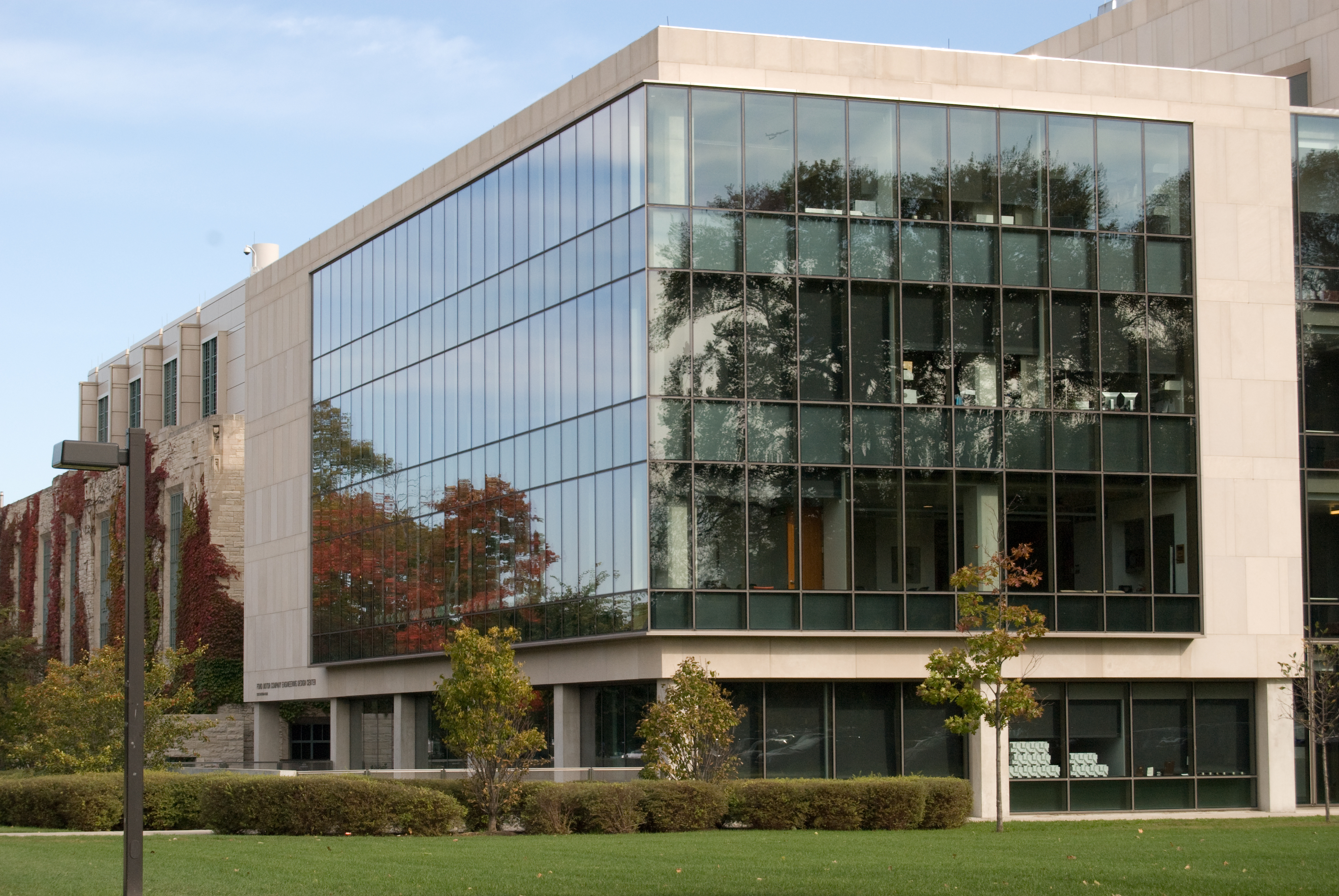
Ford Motor Company Engineering Design Center

The most popular and prominent majors at Northwestern in 2021 include communication, journalism, engineering, computer science, mathematics, statistics, biological sciences, physics, and chemistry. It is also prominent in law and medicine. Northwestern is accredited by the Higher Learning Commission and the respective national professional organizations for chemistry, psychology, business, education, journalism, music, engineering, law, and medicine. Northwestern conferred 2,190 bachelor's degrees, 3,272 master's degrees, 565 doctoral degrees, and 444 professional degrees in 2012–2013. Since 1951, Northwestern has awarded 520 honorary degrees. Northwestern also has chapters of academic honor societies such as Phi Beta Kappa (Alpha of Illinois), Eta Kappa Nu, Tau Beta Pi, Eta Sigma Phi (Beta chapter), Lambda Pi Eta, and Alpha Sigma Lambda (Alpha chapter).

Northwestern maintains a student-to-faculty ratio of 6:1. 77% of the classes have less than 20 students while 5.5% of the classes have more than 50 students.

=== Libraries and museums ===
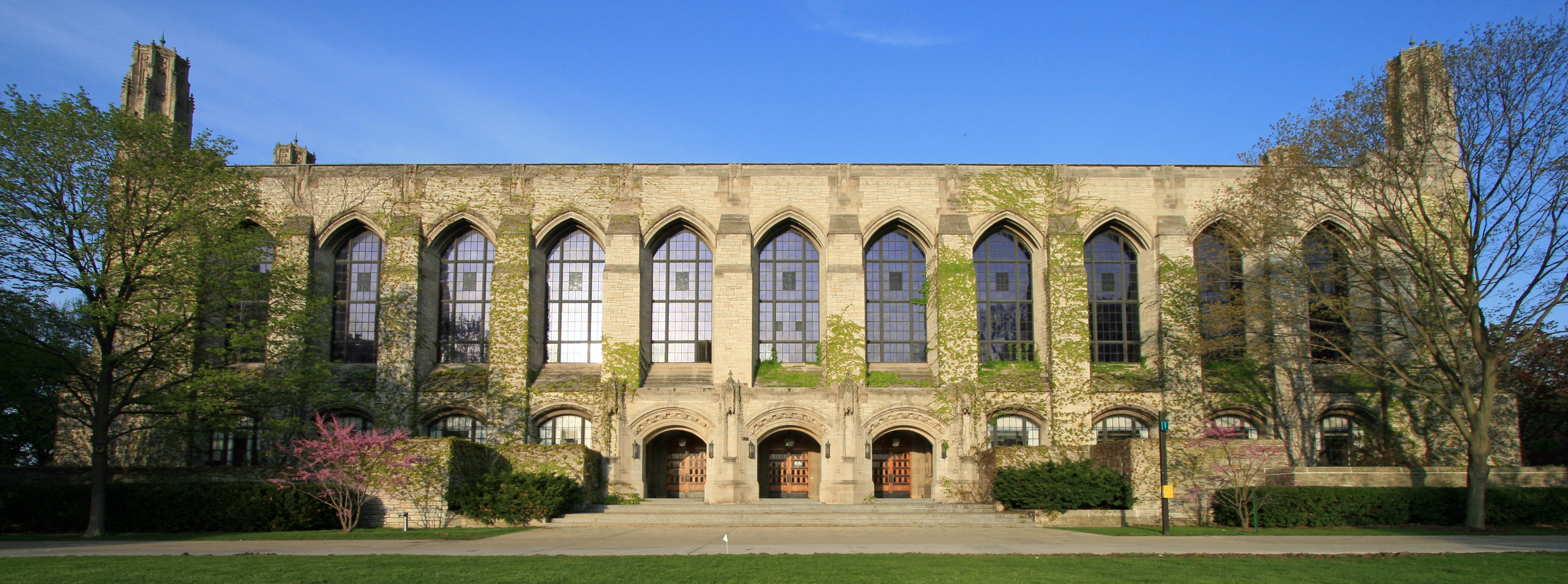
Deering Library, named in memory of Charles Deering

The Northwestern library system consists of four libraries on the Evanston campus including the Main University Library, the Boas Mathematics Library, Mudd Library, and the original library building, Deering Library; three libraries on the Chicago campus; and the library affiliated with Garrett-Evangelical Theological Seminary. Northwestern Libraries host a total of 8,198,268 printed or electronic volumes. In addition, its libraries contain 229,198 maps, 211,127 audio files, 103,377 printed journals, 196,716 electronic journals, 91,334 movies or videos, 36,989 manuscripts, 4.6 million microforms, and almost 99,000 periodicals. The University Library is the 14th-largest university library in North America based on total number of titles held.

==== Collections and sections ====
Among the library's collection and sections are:

- Melville J. Herskovits Library of African Studies: established in 1954, and named after Melville J. Herskovits, the Herskovits Library is the largest separate Africana collection in existence. The collection includes more than 400,000 volumes (including 20,000 in African languages), 250 current newspapers and 6,000 non-circulating rare books.
- The Music Library: contains extensive holdings of printed music and archival materials documenting music composed since 1945. The collection includes more than 300,000 items, including the John Cage collection.
- Transportation Library: one of the largest transportation information centers in the world with a collection of over 500,000 items covering air, rail, highways, pipeline, water, urban transport and logistics.
- The Art Library: the Art Library holds over 160,000 books and journals about art, architecture, and design, with particular strength in 19th-century art and architecture.
- Styberg Library: the theological library serves the Garrett–Evangelical Theological Seminary and Bexley Seabury.
- Charles Deering McCormick Library of Special Collections include an extensive collection on The Long 60s, Social History, Political History, Literature, Arts, Journalism, Twentieth Century Music, Theatre, Performance, and Women's History. The Special Collections department at Charles Deering McCormick Library holds approximately 8,000 items related to the Siege and Commune of Paris during 1870–1871. This collection is one of the largest and most diverse of its kind in the world and contains a captivating range of original photographs, posters, caricatures, lithographs, manuscripts, books, newspapers, and other artifacts that were created in response to the significant events that occurred during that year. These events included France's defeat in the Franco-Prussian War, the downfall of the Second Empire, the four-month siege of Paris, and the violent civil war that ended the Commune uprising. The core of the collection was acquired in 1971, the centenary year of the Commune's end, when the library's astute staff purchased most of the offerings of a well-known French book dealer. Since then, many other acquisitions have been added to the collection. The Franco-Prussian War was among the earliest conflicts to be photographed, and the collection includes many such images, along with depictions of the devastated Parisian landscape and some of the earliest examples of manipulated photographs created for propaganda purposes. The collection also encompasses a significant amount of material that covers military activities during the Spanish Civil War and the early stages of World War II from both sides of the conflict. In addition, the collection showcases the impact of warfare on civilians who were displaced or killed in various parts of Spain, including any interactions with France and Germany during that period. The collection also features various other topics that offer insight into Spain's cultural and social dynamics throughout history. The photographs in the collection were sourced from international press outlets and private collections and are accompanied by captions that provide historical background and context for the subjects depicted.
- Northwestern University Archives
- Pritzker Legal Research Center: the library is located on the Chicago campus and serves the Northwestern University Pritzker School of Law.
- Seeley G. Mudd Library: Located on North Campus, Mudd Library was renovated in 2017 with collaboration and technology in mind.
- Charles Deering Memorial Library: built in 1933, and named for Charles Deering, the library houses the art library, the Charles Deering McCormick Library of Special Collections, the Music Library and University Archives.
- Boas Mathematics Library: the library serves primarily the Mathematics Department and Statistics Department and has a research collection in pure mathematics and statistics of around 34,000 volumes.
- The Mary and Leigh Block Museum of Art, a major art museum in Chicago, contains more than 4,000 works in its permanent collection. It dedicates a third of its space to temporary and traveling exhibitions.
- The Holocaust Educational Foundation, which had previously endowed the Theodore Zev Weiss – Holocaust Educational Foundation Professorship in Holocaust studies, became part of Northwestern in 2011.

Northwestern, along with 15 other universities, participates in digitizing its collections as part of the Google Book Search project. Northwestern University Library is a partner with the Native American Education Services College (NAES), the American Indian Association of Illinois (AIAI), and Northwestern University's Center for Native American and Indigenous Research in the NAES College Digital Library Project, which preserves the NAES College library and archives.

== Research and innovations ==
=== Research ===
Northwestern was elected to the Association of American Universities in 1917 and is classified as an R1 university, denoting "very high" research activity. Northwestern's schools of management, engineering, and communication are among the most academically productive in the nation. The university received $923.8 million in research funding and $421 million in NIH funding in 2022 and houses over 90 school-based and 40 university-wide research institutes and centers. Northwestern also supports nearly 1,500 research laboratories across two campuses, predominantly in the medical and biological sciences. Also, Northwestern houses more than 50 University Research Institutes & Centers (URICS), which consists of institutes and initiatives that combine multiple areas of study to pursue research across domains such as quantum information, policy research, bioelectronics, and more.

Northwestern is home to the Center for Interdisciplinary Exploration and Research in Astrophysics, Northwestern Institute for Complex Systems, Nanoscale Science and Engineering Center, Materials Research Center, Center for Quantum Devices, Institute for Policy Research, International Institute for Nanotechnology, Center for Catalysis and Surface Science, Buffet Center for International and Comparative Studies, the Initiative for Sustainability and Energy at Northwestern, and the Argonne/Northwestern Solar Energy Research Center among other centers for interdisciplinary research.

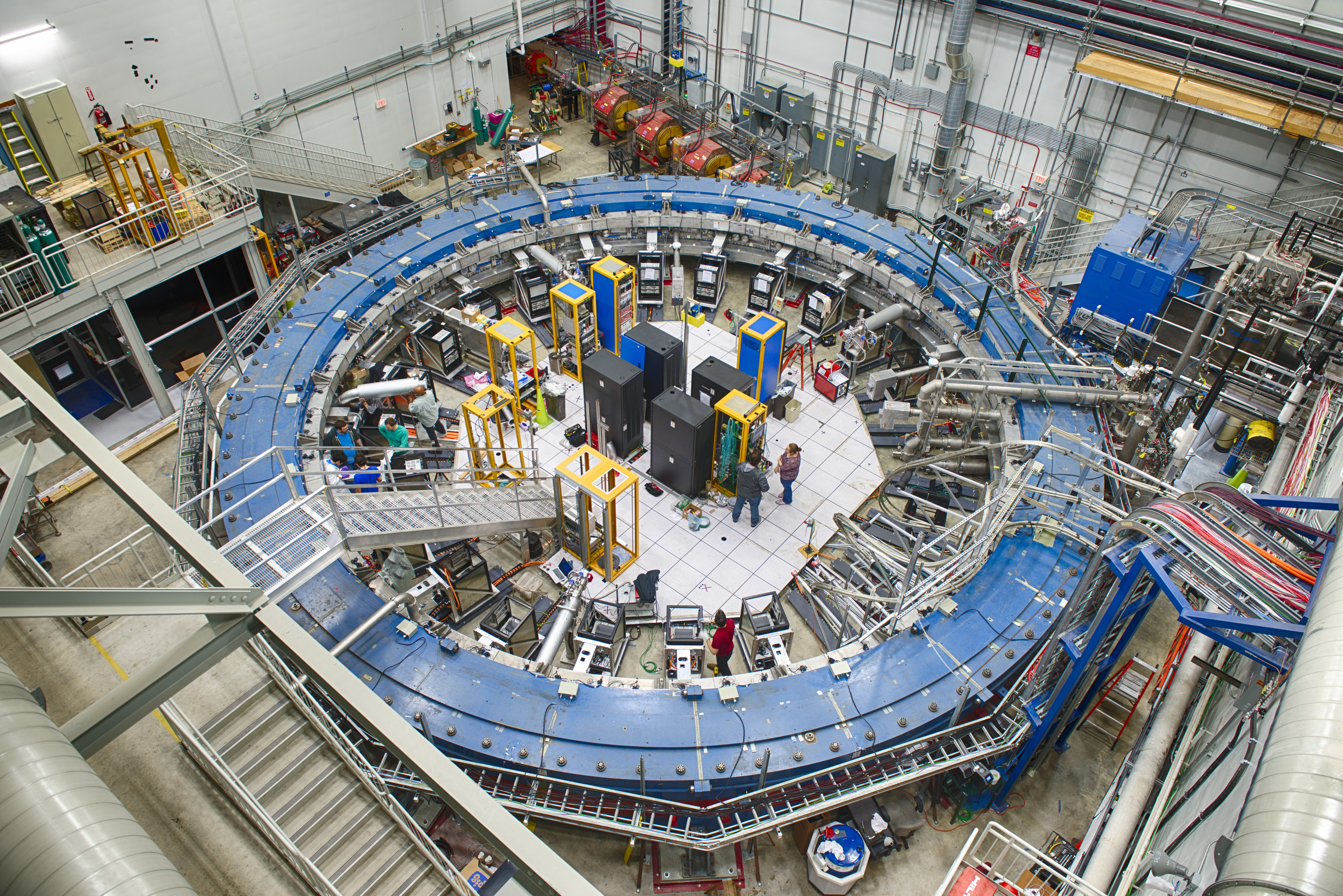
The E989 storage-ring magnet at Fermilab, which was originally designed for the E821 experiment. The geometry allows for a very uniform magnetic field to be established in the ring.

The university also shares collaborative research efforts with other universities such as the CZ Biohub Chicago with the University of Chicago and University of Illinois.

In addition, Northwestern University cooperates with research institutions such as Argonne National Laboratory and Fermi National Accelerator Laboratory (FermiLab). Proceeding in cooperation with these laboratories, the Center for Applied Physics and Superconducting Technologies (CAPST) and the Initiative at Northwestern for Quantum Information Research and Engineering (INQUIRE) have attracted attention in recent years. Northwestern's investment and collaboration areas include particle physics, quantum physics, quantum information technologies, and superconducting technologies.

=== Innovations and entrepreneurship ===
In 2013, Northwestern researchers disclosed 247 inventions, filed 270 patent applications, received 81 foreign and US patents, started 12 companies, and generated $79.8 million in licensing revenue. The Innovation and New Ventures Office (INVO) has been involved in creating the Center for Developmental Therapeutics (CDT) and the Center for Device Development (CD2).

Northwestern files hundreds of patents each year, ranking among the top 20 universities in the world in terms of U.S. utility patents. One of the university's most successful current patents is pregabalin, a synthesized organic molecule developed at the university by chemistry professor Richard Bruce Silverman (for whom Silverman Hall was named). It was ultimately marketed as Lyrica, a drug sold by Pfizer, to combat epilepsy, neuropathic pain, and fibromyalgia.

Northwestern has an extensive history of producing prominent businessmen and entrepreneurs. Companies founded by Northwestern alumni include Groupon, The Blackstone Group, Booz Allen Hamilton, U.S. Steel, Kirkland & Ellis, Guggenheim Partners, Accenture, Aon Corporation, and AQR Capital.

The university also runs The Garage, and interdisciplinary innovation and entrepreneurship space and community for student-run startups. The Garage provides students with resources and programming related to entrepreneurship and mentorship. The Garage houses approximately 90 student-founded startups per academic quarter. Its programs and resources are available to all Northwestern students.

== Student life ==
=== Student body ===
Student body composition as of May 2, 2022
Race and ethnicity	Total
White	42%
Asian	19%
Hispanic	13%
Foreign national	10%
Other (Note: Other consists of Multiracial Americans & those who prefer to not say.)	9%
Black	6%
Economic diversity
Low-income (Note: The percentage of students who received an income-based federal Pell grant intended for low-income students.)	20%
Affluent (Note: The percentage of students who are a part of the American middle class at the bare minimum.)	80%

Northwestern enrolls more than 8000 undergraduate students and more than 8000 graduate students each year, as mentioned on the "About Our Students: Recruit at Northwestern" page on Northwestern's website. The freshman retention rate for that year was 99%. Eighty-six percent of students graduated after four years and 96% graduated after six years.

The undergraduate population is drawn from all 50 states and over 75 foreign countries. Twenty percent of students in the Class of 2024 were Pell Grant recipients and 12.56% were first-generation college students. Northwestern also enrolls the ninth-most National Merit Scholars of any university in the nation.

In Fall 2014, 40.6% of undergraduate students were enrolled in the Weinberg College of Arts and Sciences, 21.3% in the McCormick School of Engineering and Applied Science, 14.3% in the School of Communication, 11.7% in the Medill School of Journalism, 5.7% in the Bienen School of Music, and 6.4% in the School of Education and Social Policy. The five most commonly awarded undergraduate degrees are economics, journalism, communication studies, psychology, and political science. The Kellogg School of Management's MBA, the School of Law's JD, and the Feinberg School of Medicine's MD are the three largest professional degree programs by enrollment. With 2,446 students enrolled in science, engineering, and health fields, the largest graduate programs by enrollment include chemistry, integrated biology, material sciences, electrical and computer engineering, neuroscience, and economics.

=== Undergraduate housing ===
Northwestern offers both traditional residence halls and residential colleges for students who share a particular intellectual interest. The residential colleges include Ayers College of Commerce and Industry, Chapin Hall (Humanities), East Fairchild (Communications), Hobart House (women's), the Public Affairs Residential College, the Residential College of Cultural and Community Studies, Shepard Residential College (multi-thematic), Slivka Residential College for Science and Engineering, West Fairchild (International Studies), and Willard Residential College (multi-thematic). Residence halls include Allison Hall, Bobb-McCulloch, Elder Hall, Foster-Walker Complex (commonly referred to as Plex), Rogers House, and Shapiro Hall (formerly known as 560 Lincoln) among others.

An estimated 20% of undergraduates are affiliated with a fraternity or sorority. Northwestern recognizes 21 fraternities and 18 sororities.

All incoming undergraduates at Northwestern University are required to live on campus for their first two years.

=== Traditions ===
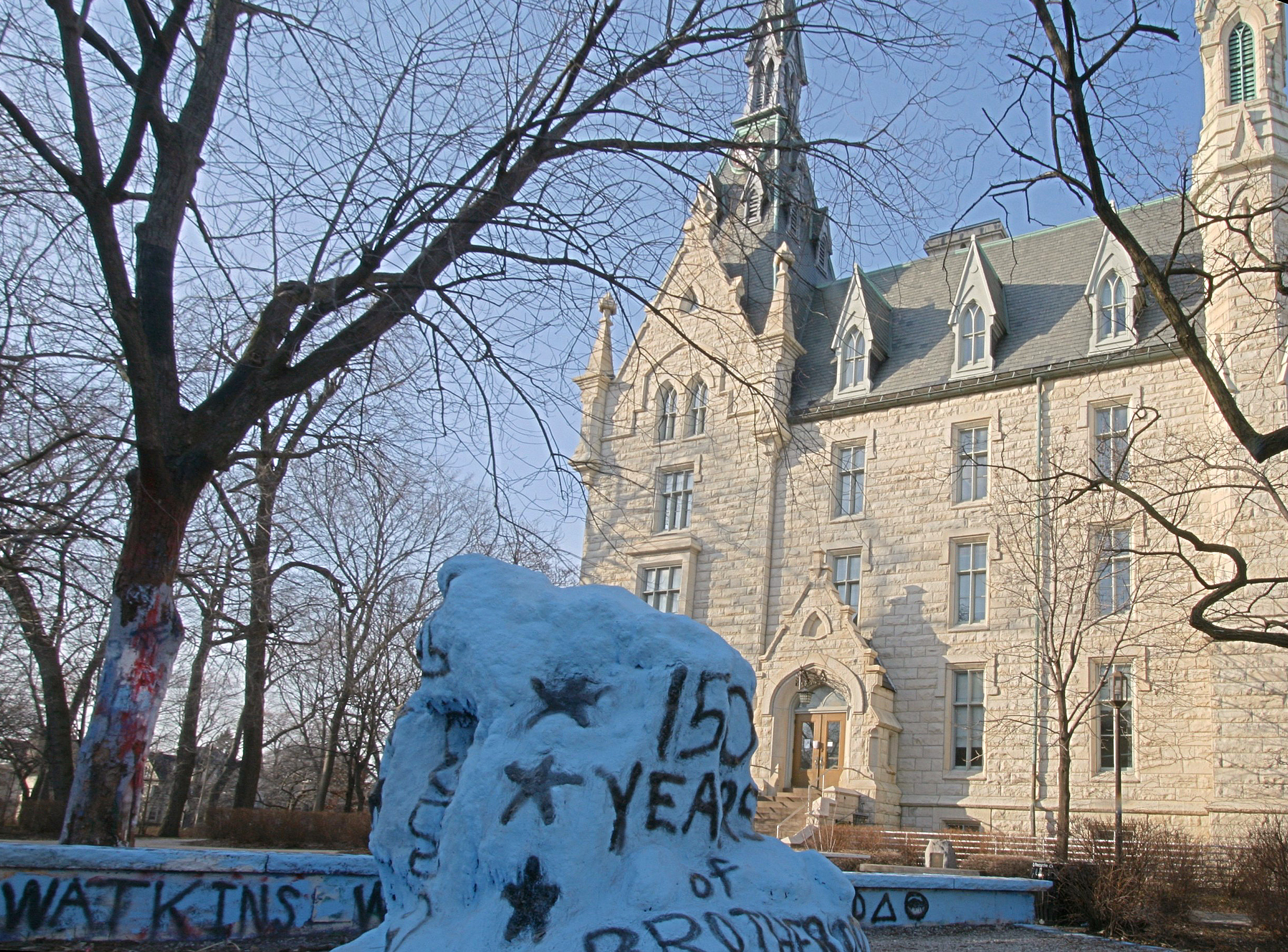
- The Rock in front of the University Hall
  "Alma Mater" is the Northwestern Hymn. The original Latin version of the hymn was written in 1907 by Peter Christian Lutkin, the first dean of the School of Music from 1883 to 1931. In 1953, then Director-of-Bands John Paynter recruited an undergraduate music student, Thomas Tyra ('54), to write an English version of the song, which today is performed by the Marching Band during halftime at Wildcat football games and by the orchestra during ceremonies and other special occasions.
- Purple became Northwestern's official color in 1892, replacing black and gold after a university committee concluded that too many other universities had used these colors. Today, Northwestern's official color is purple, although white is something of an official color as well, being mentioned in both the university's earliest song, Alma Mater (1907) ("Hail to purple, hail to white") and in many university guidelines.
- The Rock, a six-foot-high quartzite boulder donated by the Class of 1902, originally served as a water fountain. It was painted over by students in the 1940s as a prank and has since become a popular vehicle of self-expression on campus. By tradition, students must guard it for twenty-four hours before painting it. To fulfill this rule, the rock is streamed 24/7 on YouTube.
- Dillo Day, held at Northwestern University, is an all-day music festival that occurs towards the end of the spring quarter on the Lakefill. Established during the 1972/73 academic year, the event is orchestrated by Mayfest Productions, a student organization, and is the largest entirely student-managed music festival in the United States.
- March Through the Arch is a tradition at Northwestern University that symbolically marks a student's start to the university. This event takes place during Wildcat Welcome week. Students pass through the Weber Arch on campus, representing their entry into a new chapter of their academic and personal lives. When graduating students march back through the arch.
- Primal Scream is held every quarter at 9 p.m. on the Sunday before finals week. Students lean out of windows or gather in courtyards and scream to help relieve stress.

=== Philanthropy ===
One of Northwestern's student charity events is Dance Marathon. It has raised over $1 million for charity every year since 2011 and has donated a total of $13 million to children's charities since its conception.

The Northwestern Community Development Corps (NCDC) is a student-run organization that connects hundreds of student volunteers to community development projects in Evanston and Chicago throughout the year. The group also holds a number of annual community events, including Project Pumpkin, a Halloween celebration that provides over 800 local children with carnival events and a safe venue to trick-or-treat each year.

Many Northwestern students participate in the Freshman Urban Program, an initiative for students interested in community service to work on addressing social issues facing the city of Chicago, and the university's Global Engagement Studies Institute (GESI) programs, including group service-learning expeditions in Asia, Africa, or Latin America in conjunction with the Foundation for Sustainable Development.

Several international nongovernmental organizations were established at Northwestern, including the World Health Imaging, Informatics and Telemedicine Alliance, a spin-off from an engineering student's honors thesis.

=== Performing arts ===
Northwestern is a producer of entertainers and a hub for collegiate performing arts. The Student Theatre Coalition, or StuCo, organizes nine student theater companies, multiple performance groups, and over sixty independent productions each year. Productions include The Waa-Mu Show, an original musical written and produced entirely by students, and the Dolphin show. Children's theater is represented on campus by Griffin's Tale and Purple Crayon Players.

Chicago's Lookingglass Theatre Company, which began life in Jones Residential College, was founded in 1988 by several university alumni, including David Schwimmer. It received the Regional Tony Award in 2011 and has won over 45 Joseph Jefferson Awards in its 30 seasons.

The undergraduate students maintain twelve a cappella groups, including THUNK a cappella, the Northwestern Undertones, Freshman Fifteen A Cappella, ShireiNU A Cappella, and Purple Haze.

Northwestern's performing arts scene also includes Boomshaka, which is the university's drum, dance, and rhythm ensemble.

=== Media ===
==== Print ====
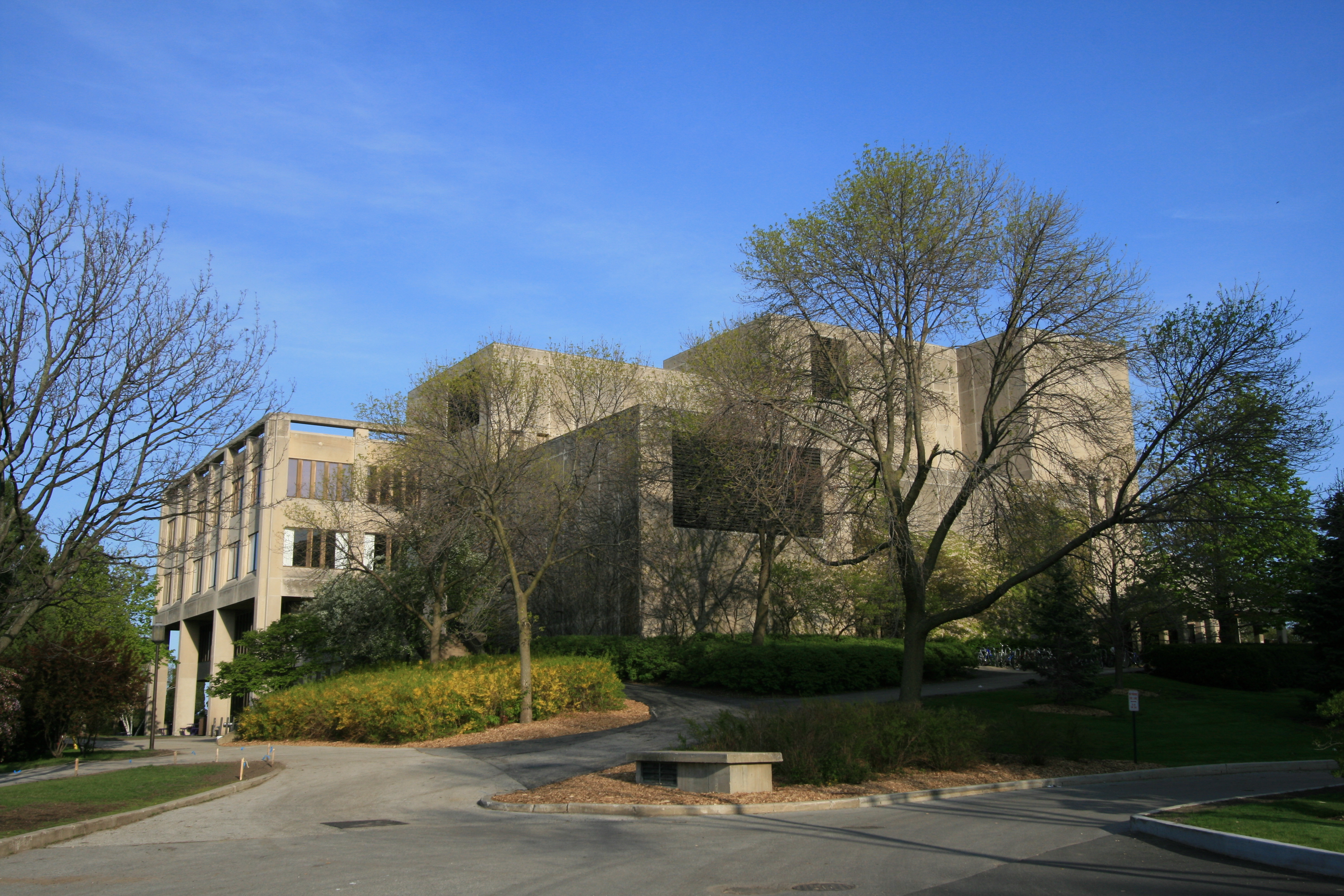
- Norris University Center, the main center for student union
  Established in 1881, The Daily Northwestern is the university's main student newspaper and is published on weekdays during the academic year. It is directed entirely by undergraduate students and owned by the Students Publishing Company. Although it serves the Northwestern community, the Daily has no business ties to the university and is supported wholly by advertisers.
- North by Northwestern is an online undergraduate magazine established in September 2006 by students at the Medill School of Journalism. Published on weekdays, it consists of updates on news stories and special events throughout the year. It also publishes a quarterly print magazine.
- Syllabus is the university's undergraduate yearbook. It is distributed in late May and features a culmination of the year's events at Northwestern. First published in 1885, the yearbook is published by Students Publishing Company and edited by Northwestern students.
- Northwestern Flipside is an undergraduate satirical magazine. Founded in 2009, it publishes a weekly issue both in print and online.
- Helicon is the university's undergraduate literary magazine. Established in 1979, it is published twice a year: a web issue is released in the winter and a print issue with a web complement is released in the spring.
- The Protest is Northwestern's quarterly social justice magazine.
- The Northwestern division of Student Multicultural Affairs supports a number of publications for particular cultural groups including Ahora, a magazine about Hispanic and Latino/a culture and campus life; Al Bayan, published by the Northwestern Muslim-cultural Student Association; BlackBoard Magazine, a magazine centered around African-American student life; and NUAsian, a magazine and blog on Asian and Asian-American culture and issues.
- The Northwestern University Law Review is a scholarly legal publication and student organization at Northwestern University School of Law. Its primary purpose is to publish a journal of broad legal scholarship. The Law Review publishes six issues each year. Student editors make the editorial and organizational decisions and select articles submitted by professors, judges, and practitioners, as well as student pieces. The Law Review also publishes scholarly pieces weekly on the Colloquy.
- The Northwestern Journal of Technology and Intellectual Property is a law review published by an independent student organization at Northwestern University School of Law.
- The Northwestern Interdisciplinary Law Review is a scholarly legal publication published annually by an editorial board of Northwestern undergraduates. Its mission is to publish interdisciplinary legal research, drawing from fields such as history, literature, economics, philosophy, and art. Founded in 2008, the journal features articles by professors, law students, practitioners, and undergraduates. It is funded by the Buffett Center for International and Comparative Studies and the Office of the Provost.
- CRUSH Magazine is Northwestern University’s queer-interest publication, established in 2024. It features a range of content, including news, essays, art, photography, and themed issues, exploring LGBTQ+ culture.

==== Web-based ====
- TriQuarterly is a literary magazine published twice a year featuring poetry, fiction, nonfiction, drama, literary essays, reviews, blog posts, and art.
- Established in January 2011, Sherman Ave is a satirical website that often publishes content on Northwestern student life.
- Established in 2010 by undergraduates, Politics & Policy provides analysis of current events and public policy.
- Founded in 2005, Northwestern Business Review is a campus source for business news.
- The Queer Reader is Northwestern's first radical feminist and LGBTQ+ publication.

==== Radio, film, and television ====
- WNUR (89.3 FM) is a 7,200-watt radio station that broadcasts to the north side of Chicago, as well as the northern suburbs of Evanston and Skokie. WNUR's programming consists of music (jazz, classical, and rock), literature, politics, current events, varsity sports (football, men's and women's basketball, baseball, softball, and women's lacrosse), and breaking news on weekdays.
- Studio 22 is a student-run production company that produces roughly ten films each year. The organization financed the first film Zach Braff directed, and many of its films have featured students who would later go into professional acting, including Zach Gilford of Friday Night Lights.
- Applause for a Cause is currently the only student-run production company in the nation to create feature-length films for charity. It was founded in 2010 and has raised over $25,000 to date for various local and national organizations across the United States. Their 2022 film, Mixed Signals, was directed by Declan Franey and Aaron Onish and shot by Shenxun Yao. It was a critical and commercial success.
- Multicultural Filmmakers Collective is a film production and distribution organization that nurtures, promotes, and allies multicultural student, filmmakers, and stories. In the past, the Multiculti had invited guest speakers such as Ava Duvernay, Joe Talbot, and Bing Liu. In 2023, the organization introduced the first-ever undergraduate nonfiction/experimental media grant under the leadership of presidents, Shenxun Yao and Evelyn Mazariego.
- Northwestern News Network is a student television news and sports network, serving the Northwestern and Evanston communities. Its studios and newsroom are located on the fourth floor of the McCormick Tribune Center on Northwestern's Evanston campus. NNN is funded by the Medill School of Journalism.

=== Speech and debate ===
The Northwestern Debate Society has won fifteen National Debate Tournaments, the highest number of any university. Alumni of the society include Erwin Chemerinsky, legal scholar and Dean of UC Berkeley School of Law, and Elliot Mincberg of People For the American Way.

Northwestern's Mock Trial team had two teams qualify for the 2018 National Championship Tournament hosted by the American Mock Trial Association, making Northwestern one of seven schools in the nation to be represented by multiple teams at the competition. One of the two teams finished 9th in their division and is ranked 20th in the country out of roughly 750 teams for the 2018–2019 season.

== Athletics ==
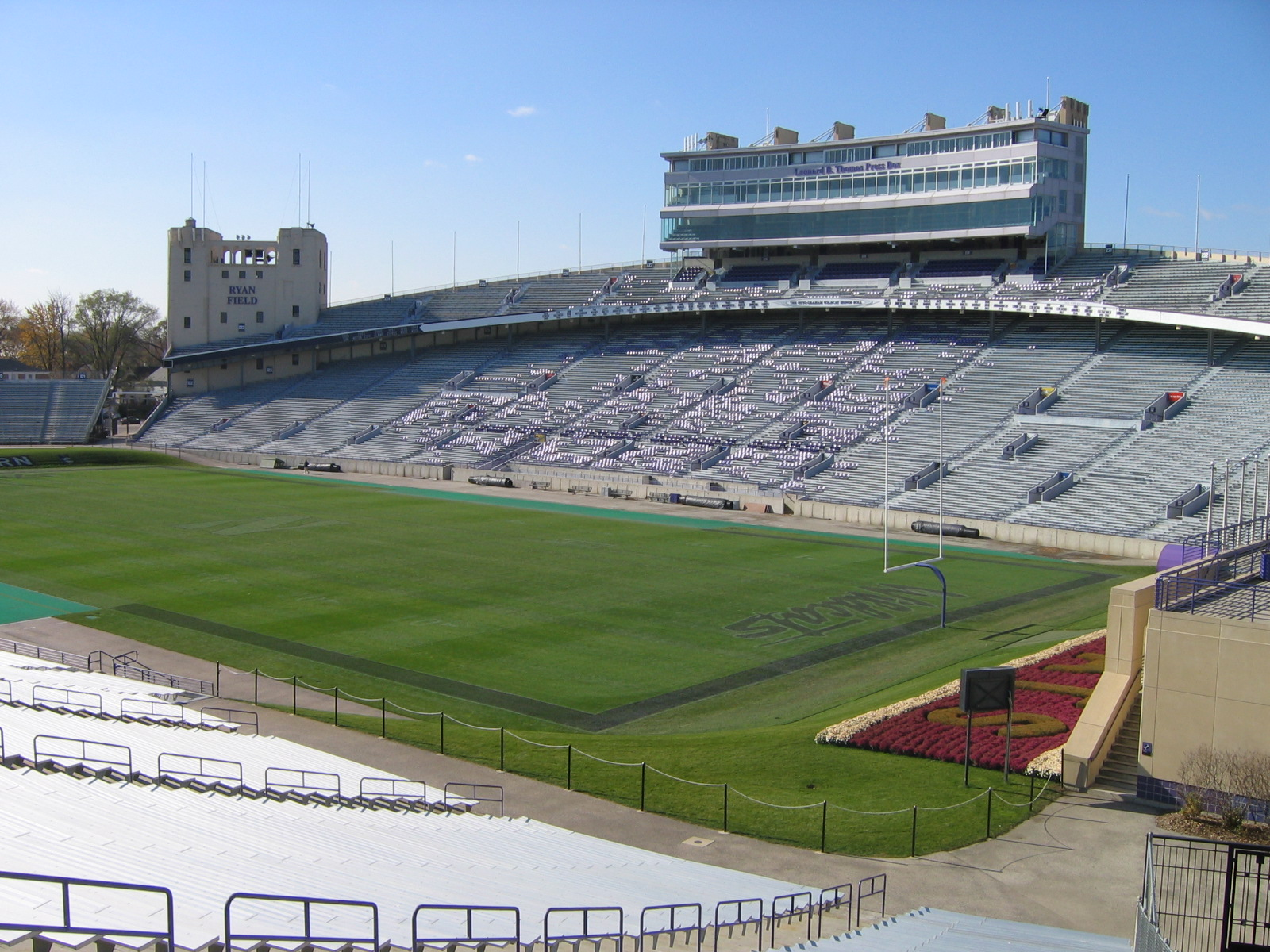
Ryan Field, Northwestern's 49,000-seat former football stadium

Northwestern is a charter member of the Big Ten Conference. It was the conference's only private university until 2024's addition of USC and possesses by far the smallest undergraduate enrollment (the next-smallest member, the University of Iowa, is roughly three times as large, with almost 22,000 undergraduates).

Northwestern fields 19 intercollegiate athletic teams (8 men's and 11 women's) in addition to numerous club sports. Twelve of Northwestern's varsity programs have had NCAA or bowl postseason appearances. Northwestern is one of five private AAU members to compete in NCAA Power Five conferences (the other four are Duke, Stanford, USC, and Vanderbilt) and maintains a 98% NCAA Graduation Success Rate, the highest among Football Bowl Subdivision schools.

In 2018, the school opened the Walter Athletics Center, a $270 million state-of-the-art lakefront facility for its athletics teams.

=== Nickname and mascot ===
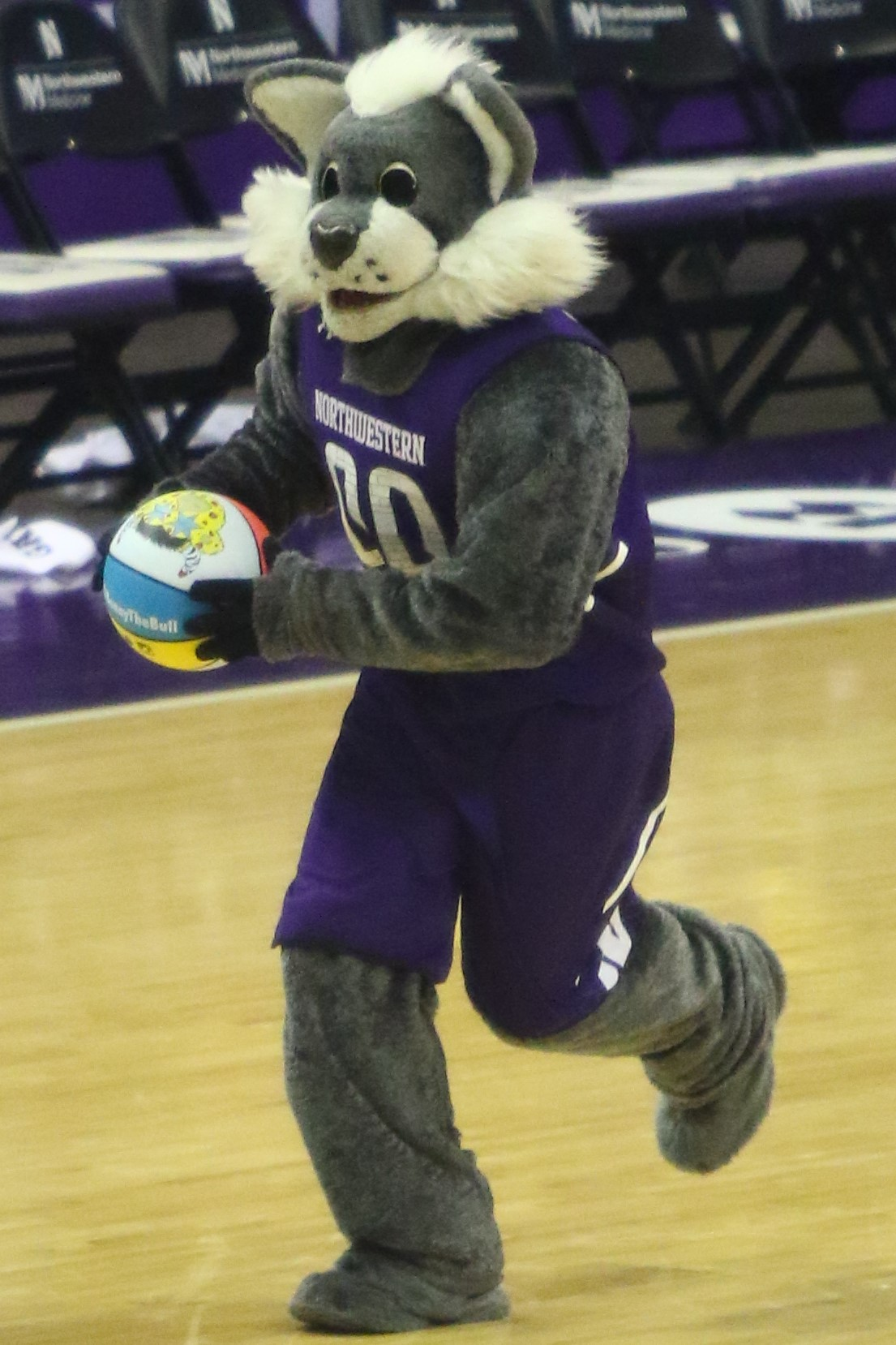
Northwestern University Mascot: Willie the Wildcat

Before 1924, Northwestern teams were known as "The Purple" and unofficially as "The Fighting Methodists." The name Wildcats was bestowed upon the university in 1924 by Wallace Abbey, a writer for the Chicago Daily Tribune, who wrote that even in a loss to the University of Chicago, "Football players had not come down from Evanston; wildcats would be a name better suited to [Coach Glenn] Thistlethwaite's boys." The name was so popular that university board members made "Wildcats" the official nickname just months later. In 1972, the student body voted to change the official nickname to "Purple Haze," but the new name never stuck.

The mascot of Northwestern Athletics is Willie the Wildcat. Prior to Willie, the team mascot had been a live, caged bear cub from the Lincoln Park Zoo named Furpaw, who was brought to the playing field on game days to greet the fans. After a losing season, the team decided that Furpaw was to blame for its misfortune and decided to select a new mascot. Willie the Wildcat made his debut in 1933, first as a logo and then in three dimensions in 1947, when members of the Alpha Delta fraternity dressed as wildcats during a Homecoming Parade.

=== Football ===
The Northwestern Wildcats football team is a Division I college football team and member of the Big Ten Conference. The team has a history dating back to 1882. They are known as the Wildcats, a nickname given by a Chicago Tribune reporter in 1924 after observing a game where the players displayed a strong and fierce presence, akin to a "wall of purple wildcats."

The team has achieved success, winning three Big Ten championships or co-championships since 1995. Additionally, they have been eligible to participate in bowl games five times between 2015 and 2020. Northwestern takes pride in its academic achievements as well, consistently ranking among the top football teams in graduation rates. They have been honored with the AFCA Academic Achievement Award four times since 2002.

The Wildcats play their home games at Ryan Field, a new stadium on the site of the original Ryan Field. Given their close proximity to Chicago and strong connections to the city, Northwestern Football is often recognized as "Chicago's Big Ten Team."

Northwestern's football team has made 73 appearances in the top 10 of the AP poll since 1936 (including five at #1) and has won eight Big Ten conference championships since 1903. At one time, Northwestern had the longest losing streak in Division I-A, losing 34 consecutive games between 1979 and 1982. They did not appear in a bowl game after 1949 until the 1996 Rose Bowl. The team did not win a bowl since the 1949 Rose Bowl until the 2013 Gator Bowl. Following the sudden death of football coach Randy Walker in 2006, 31-year-old former All-American Northwestern linebacker Pat Fitzgerald assumed the position, becoming the youngest Division I FBS coach at the time.

In 1882 as a group of Northwestern men played a "football heat" against a group of Lake Forest men. The Wildcats have since achieved an all-time-high rank of No. 1 during the 1936 and 1962 seasons, which has thus far not been duplicated. The team plays home games at Ryan Field in Evanston, Illinois. The Wildcats have participated in a total of 16 bowl games, including appearances in 10 seasons between 2008 and 2020. During the 2016–2018 seasons, they won three consecutive bowl games. In 2020, the Wildcats claimed the title of Big Ten West Champions and were champions in their bowl game.

Logo of the Northwestern Wildcats

=== Basketball ===
The Helms Athletic Foundation named the men's basketball team the 1931 National Champion. In 2017, the men's basketball team earned an NCAA berth for the first time in the program's history. They won their first-round matchup against Vanderbilt University but lost to number-one seed Gonzaga in the second round.

In 1998, two former Northwestern basketball players were charged and convicted for sports bribery, having been paid to shave points in games against three other Big Ten schools during the 1995 season. The football team became embroiled in a different betting scandal later that year when federal prosecutors indicted four former players for perjury related to betting on their own games. In August 2001, Rashidi Wheeler, a senior safety, collapsed and died during practice from an asthma attack. An autopsy revealed that he had ephedrine, a stimulant banned by the NCAA, in his system, which prompted Northwestern to investigate the prevalence of stimulants and other banned substances across all of its athletic programs. In 2006, the Northwestern women's soccer team was suspended and coach Jenny Haigh resigned following the release of images of alleged hazing.

==== Men's Basketball ====
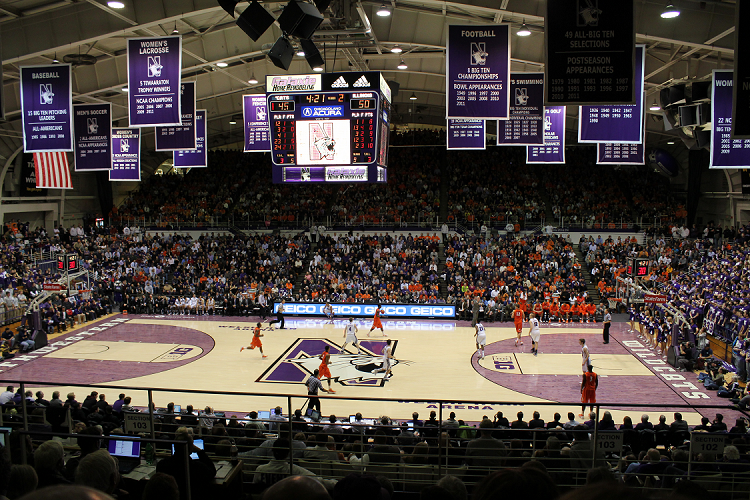
Welsh–Ryan Arena of the Northwestern University with 7,039 seats

The Wildcats men's basketball team is under the direction of Sullivan-Ubben head men's basketball coach Chris Collins, a role that he has been in since 2013. Collins led the Wildcats to heights never before reached during the 2016–17 season when the program saw a school-record 24 wins and its first NCAA tournament berth and victory in program history. Collins was named as one of four finalists for the Naismith Men's Coach of the Year award in 2017.

Northwestern’s 1930–31 team was retroactively named national champion by both the Helms Athletic Foundation and the Premo-Porretta Power Poll. Since then, the Wildcats have played in the National Invitation Tournament seven times, most recently in 2012. The men's basketball program was the first to open the renovated Welsh-Ryan Arena on November 2, 2018, in an exhibition game against McKendree. The facility was built to be the most accessible arena in college athletics and seats 7,039.

==== Women's Basketball ====
In 2017, the Wildcats saw its highest draft pick in program history with Nia Coffey, selected fifth overall by the San Antonio Stars. The first player drafted in program history was Amy Jaeschke in 2011, selected 27th overall by the Chicago Sky.

=== Fencing ===
The Northwestern Fencing program competes in the Central Collegiate Conference and has a tenured history of success. Zach Moss is the programs head coach, a role that he has been in since 2016. Following a historic 2017–18 season, Moss was named the Midwest Fencing Conference Coach of the Year as the Wildcats captured their fifth-ever conference championship and finished with three All-Americans at the NCAA Championships. Additionally, the team set the program record for most wins in a season with 47 and the program record for longest win streak at 25. The 2018–19 season saw more milestones for the Wildcats including a 39–5 record, an 11th-place finish at the NCAA Championships, and a second consecutive conference championship. The Wildcats achieved the highest ranking in program history during the season at second in the country and amassed 39 victories at the conference championships.

=== Field Hockey ===
The Northwestern Field Hockey team plays its home games at Lakeside Field, adjacent to Lanny and Sharon Martin Stadium on the lakefront. The Wildcats are led by head coach Tracey Fuchs, a role that she has been in since 2009. Fuchs has led the Wildcats to two Big Ten titles and three NCAA tournament appearances. Under Fuchs' direction, the Wildcats have posted winning seasons in 10 of her 11 seasons.

The Northwestern Wildcats field hockey team has gathered six regular-season Big Ten titles and 1 tournament title in addition to 14 NCAA tournament appearances. In 2021, the team won the NCAA tournament, followed by a championship game appearance in 2022.

=== Lacrosse ===
Northwestern lacrosse has won the national championship in women's lacrosse five straight times, from 2005 to 2009, and then again in 2011 and 2012, giving them seven championships in eight years. In 2007, the team joined Maryland as the only other school to three-peat. The run started in 2005, when the team enjoyed a perfect season and defeated many long-established east-coast schools after only five years as a varsity sport to capture the school's first national championship since 1941. In doing so, it became the westernmost institution to ever win the title. Soon after, the team made national news when members appeared in a White House photo with President Bush wearing thong sandals, or flip-flops, dubbed as the "White House flip-flop flap." The 2009 season also was an undefeated run. In their five consecutive championship seasons, the Wildcats have a 106–3 record. The Wildcats are led by head coach Kelly Amonte-Hiller, a role that she has been in since 2002. The Wildcats won their first-ever Big Ten Championship in 2019 and won their first-ever Big Ten regular season championship in 2021. Most recently, Northwestern won its ninth NCAA championship in 2026, after having won in 2023 and was runner-up 2024 and 2025.

=== Wrestling ===
The Northwestern Wildcats wrestling program hosts home matches in Welsh-Ryan Arena and practices in the Ken Kraft Wrestling Room, located in Anderson Hall. The Wildcats are led by Matt Storniolo, a role that he has been in since 2016. The Wildcats have had 40 Big Ten individual champions in addition to 10 NCAA individual champions and 75-plus All-Americans.

=== Golf ===
The men's golf team has won eight Big Ten Conference championships: 1925, 1937, 1939, 1948, 1999, 2000, 2001, 2006. They have twice placed second in the NCAA Championships: 1939, 1945. Luke Donald won the NCAA Individual Championship in 1999. He was Big Ten Conference Player of the year in 1999, and David Merkow was named the same in 2006. Donald was ranked number 1 in the Official World Golf Ranking for 56 weeks in 2011 and 2012.

== People ==
=== Alumni ===
Notable Northwestern alumni include:

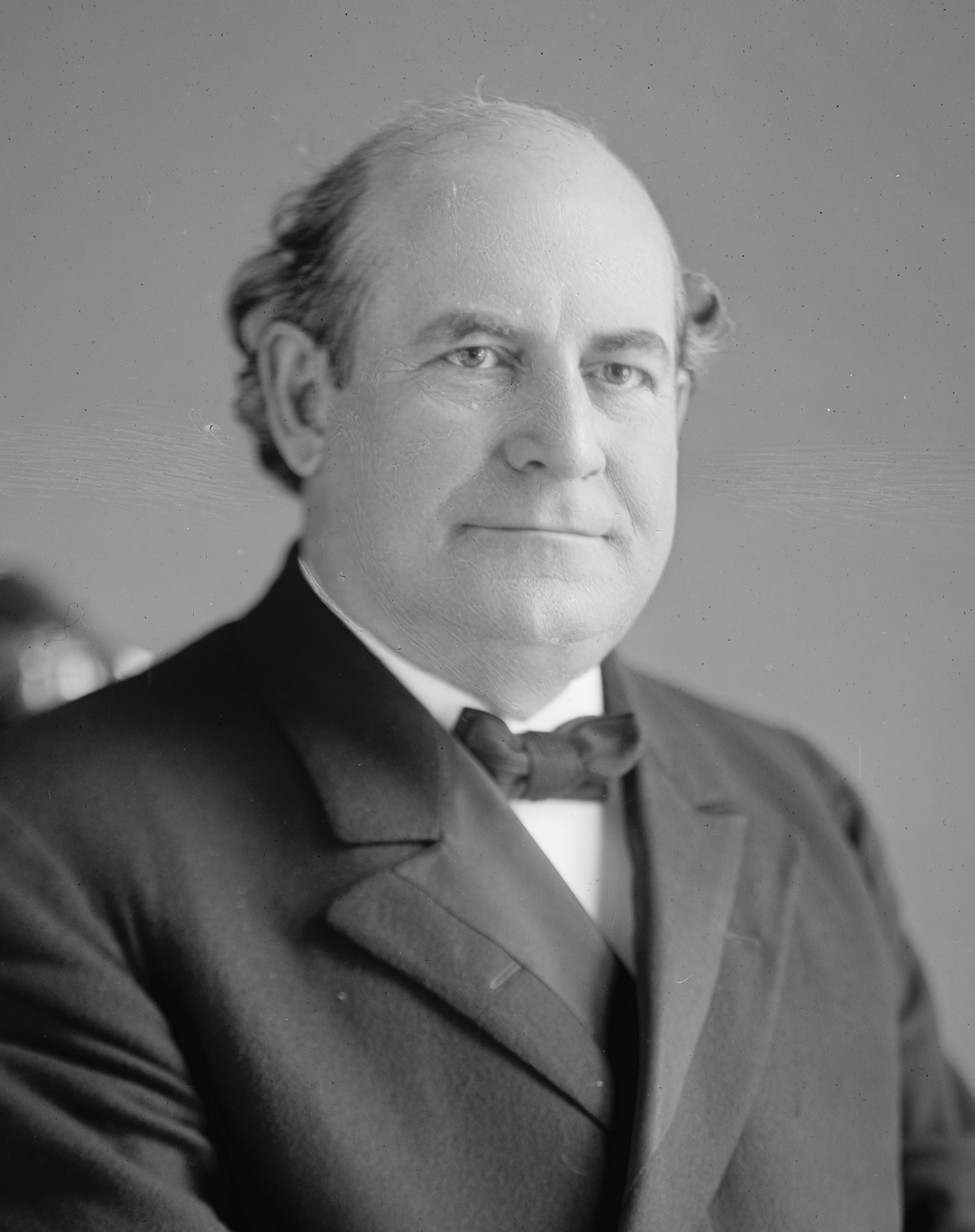
William Jennings Bryan: American lawyer and Democratic nominee for President of the United States in the 1896, 1900, and 1908 elections (LLB, 1881)

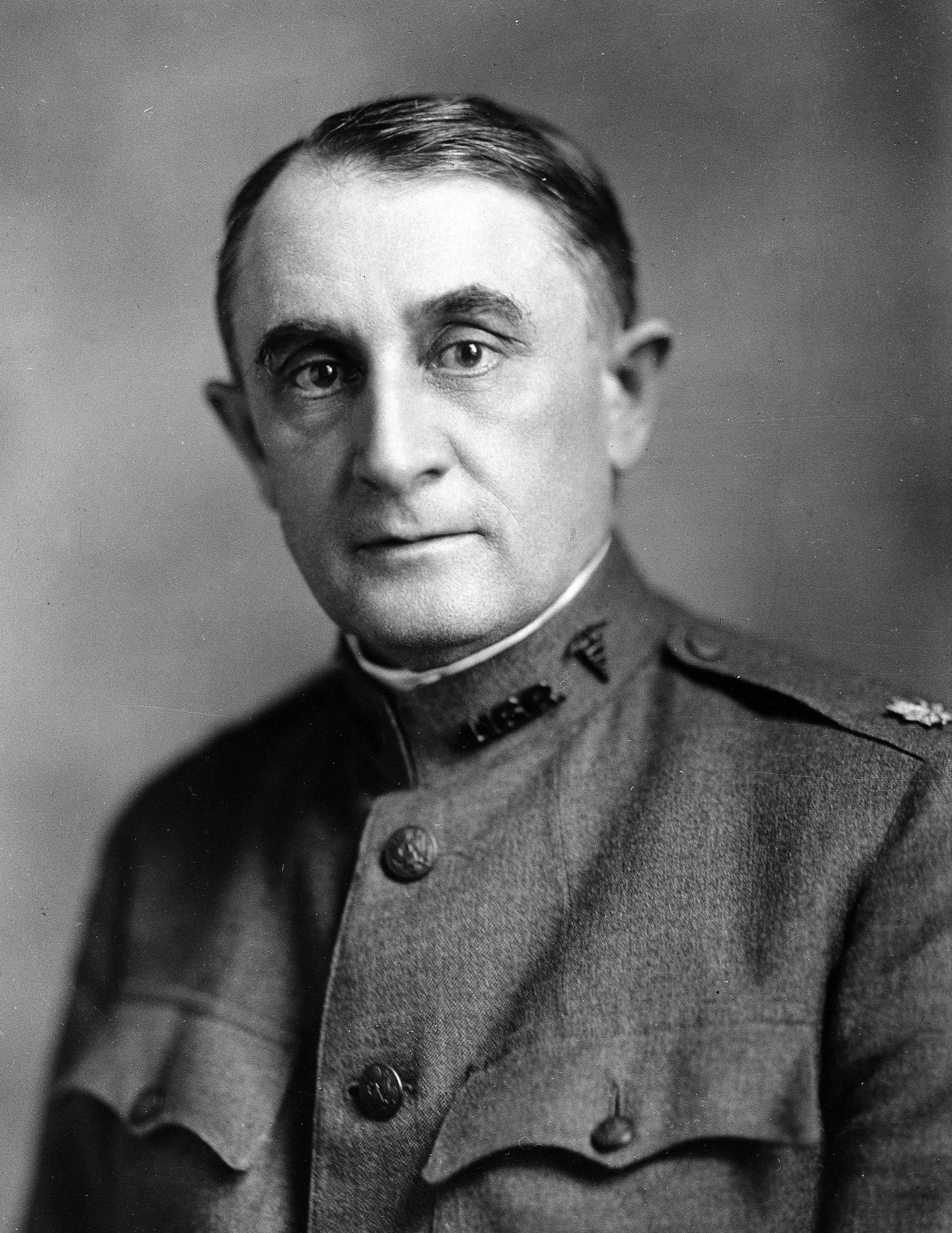
Charles Horace Mayo: American physician and founder of Mayo Clinic (MD, 1888)

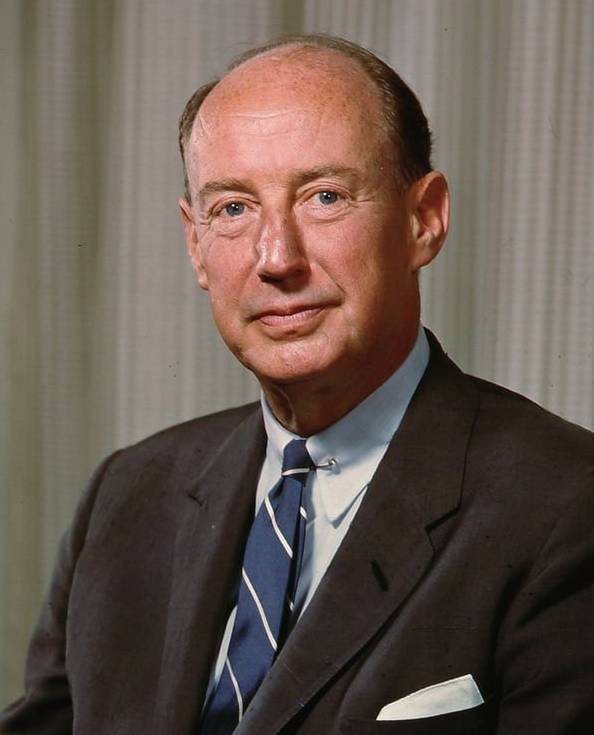
Adlai Stevenson II: American politician and 31st governor of Illinois (JD, 1926)

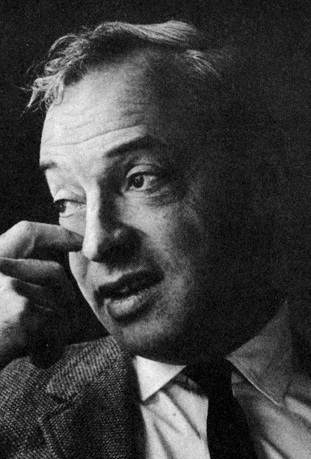
Saul Bellow: American writer and Pulitzer Prize winner (BA, 1937)

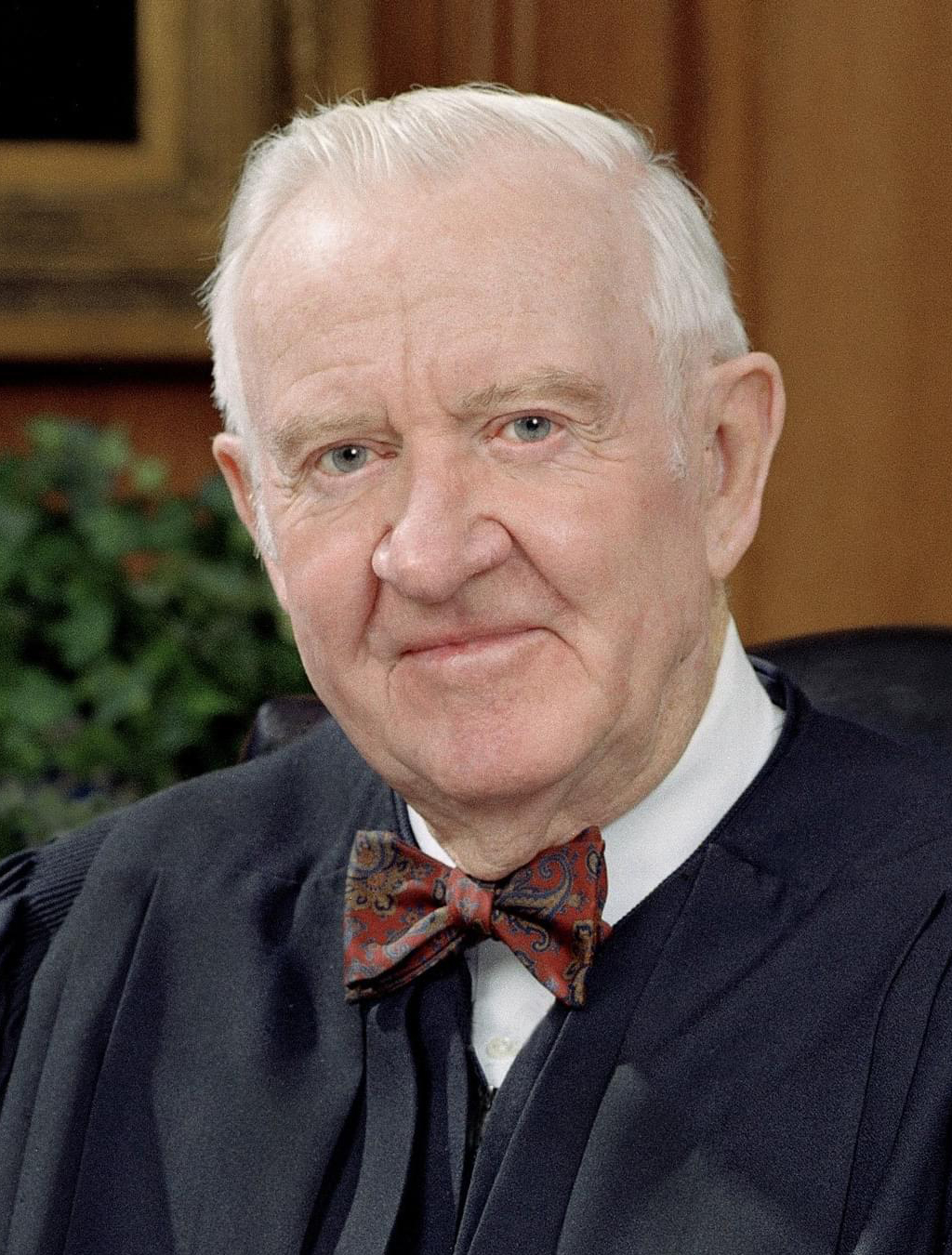
John Paul Stevens: Former Supreme Court Justice (JD, 1941)

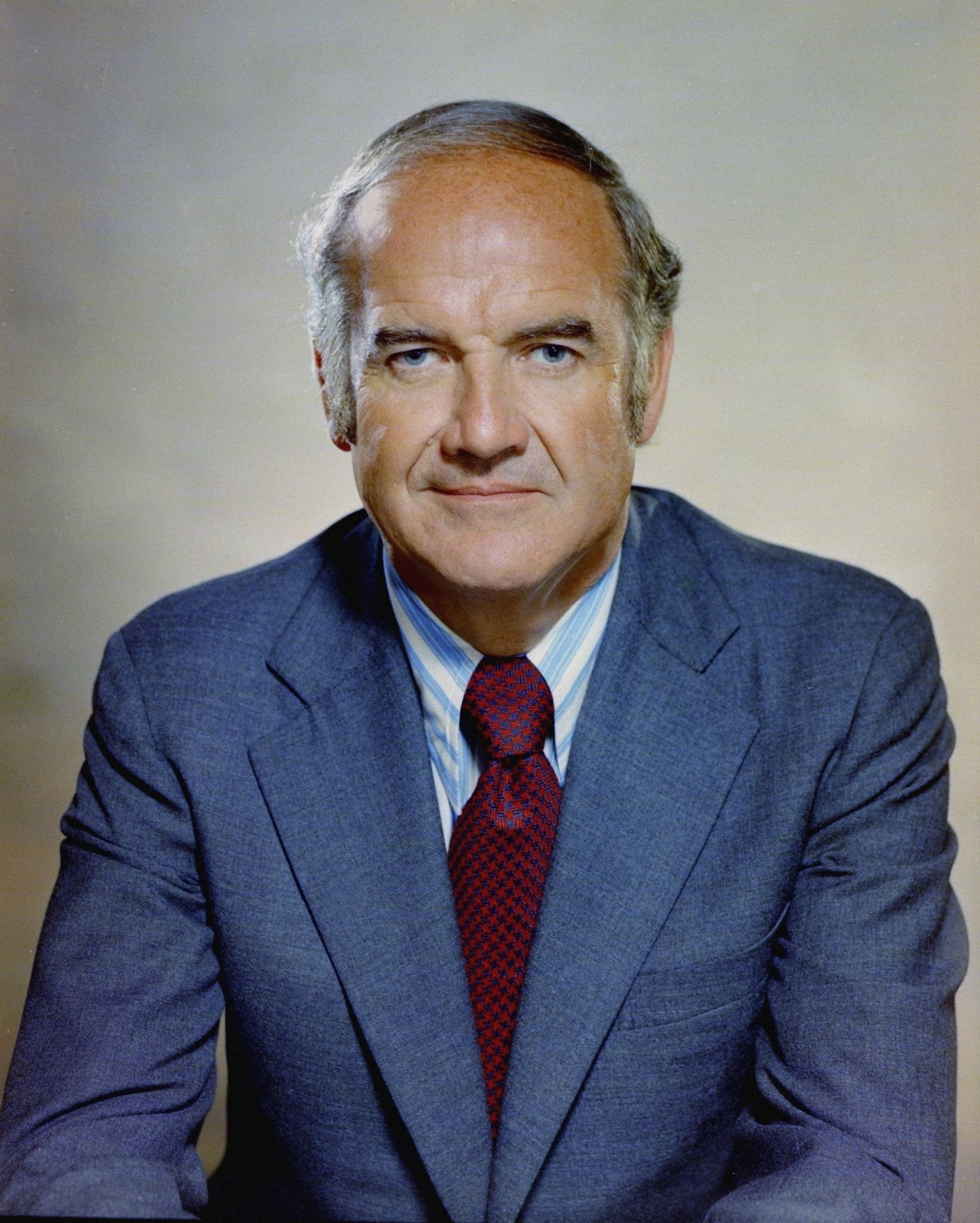
George McGovern: American historian and politician (PhD, 1951)

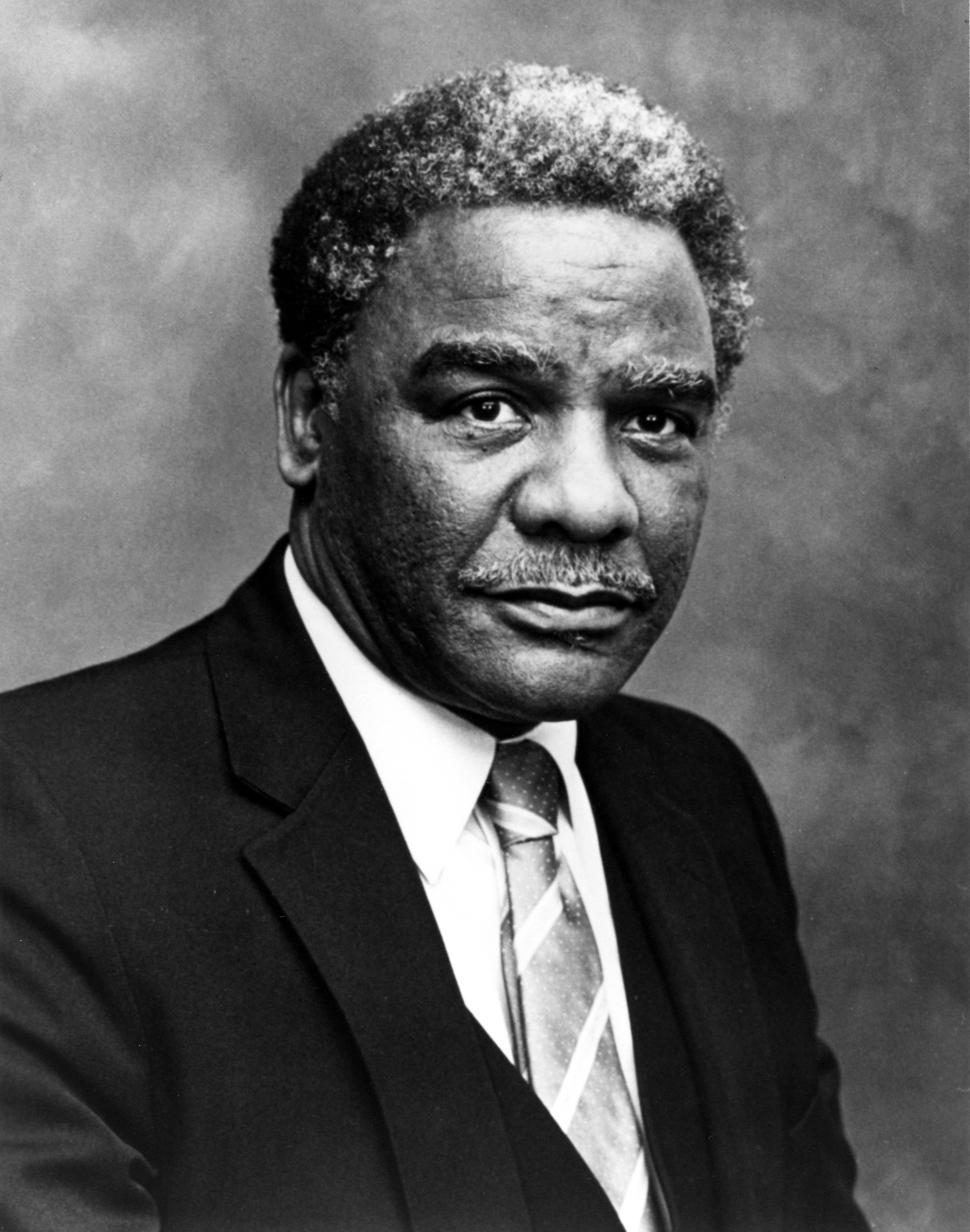
Harold Washington: American politician and 51st Mayor of Chicago (JD, 1957)

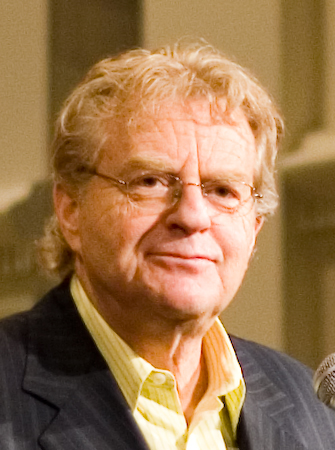
Jerry Springer: American comedian (JD, 1968)

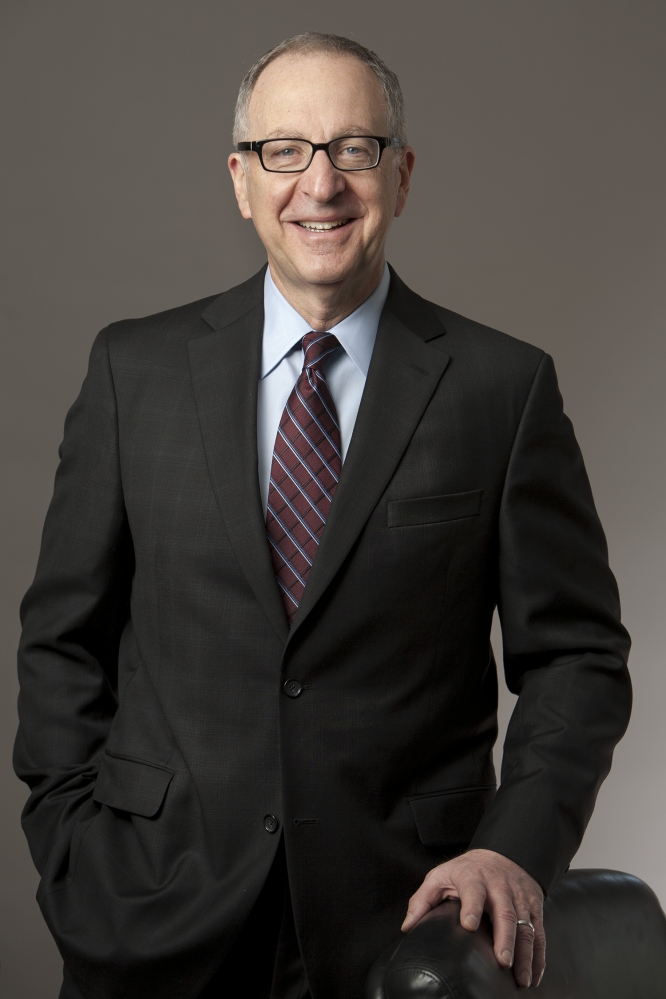
David J. Skorton: 13th Secretary of the Smithsonian Institution (BS, 1970, MD, 1974)

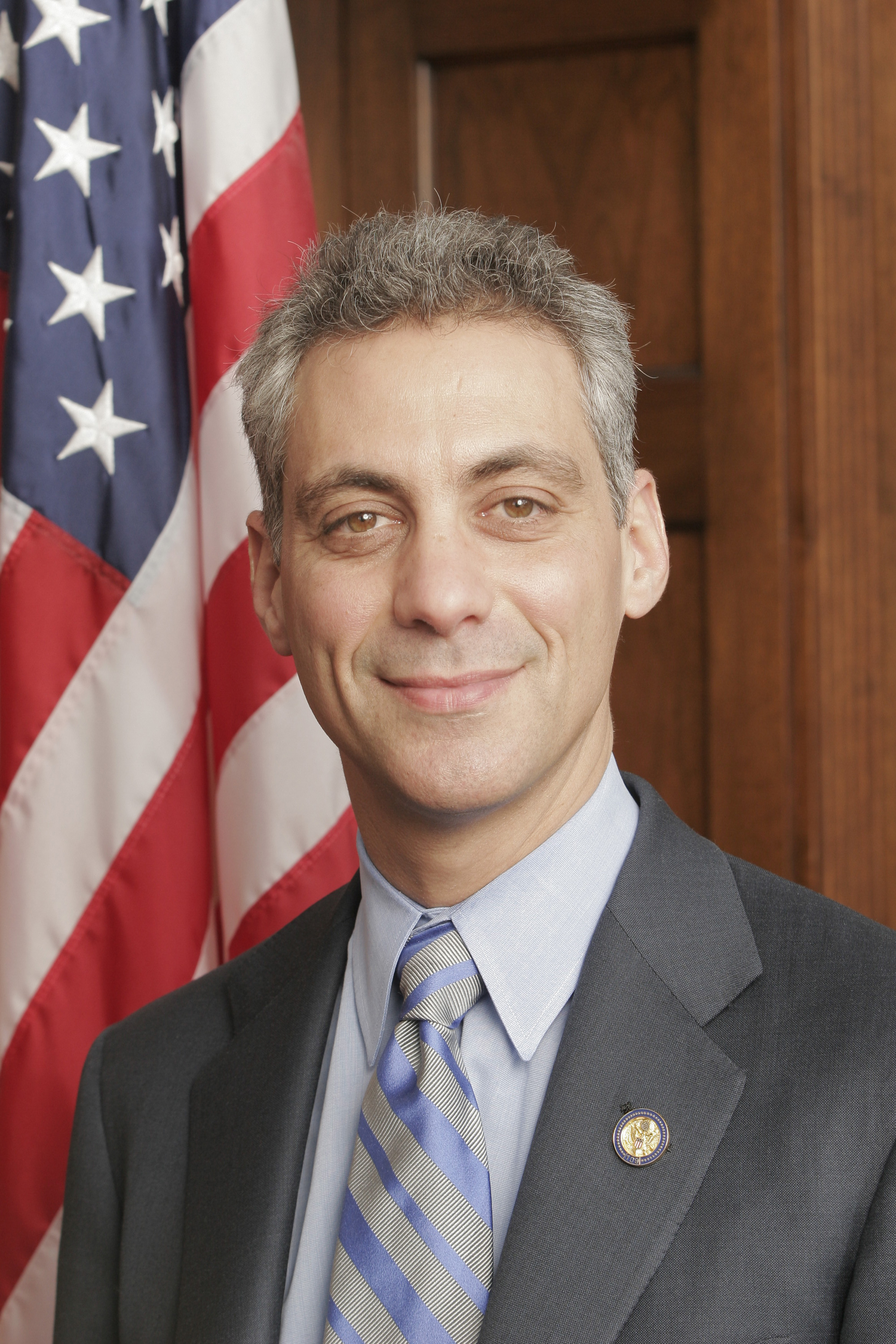
Rahm Emanuel: 55th Mayor of Chicago and former United States ambassador to Japan (MA, 1985)

Stephen Colbert: American comedian and talk show host (BA, 1986)

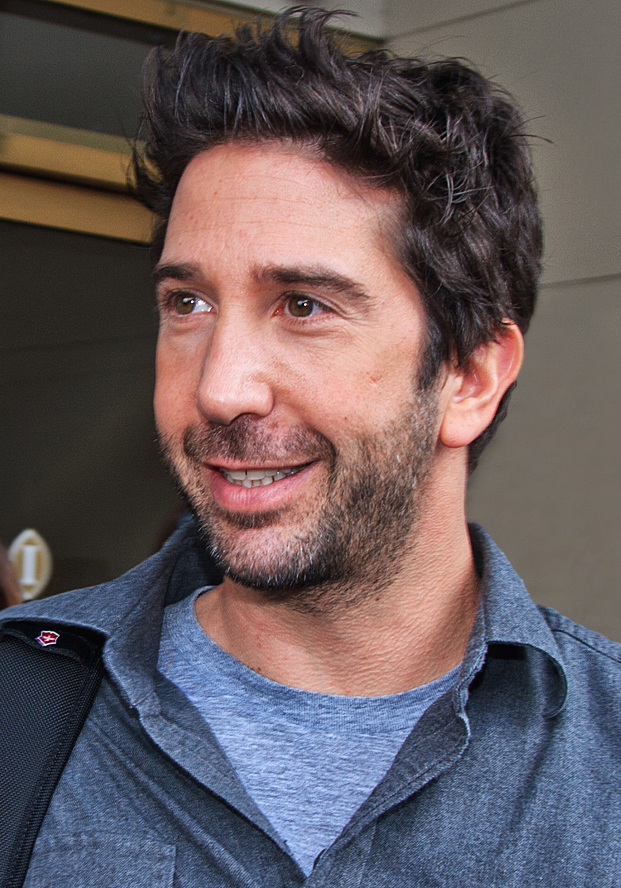
David Schwimmer: American actor best known for his role in the sitcom Friends (BA, 1988)

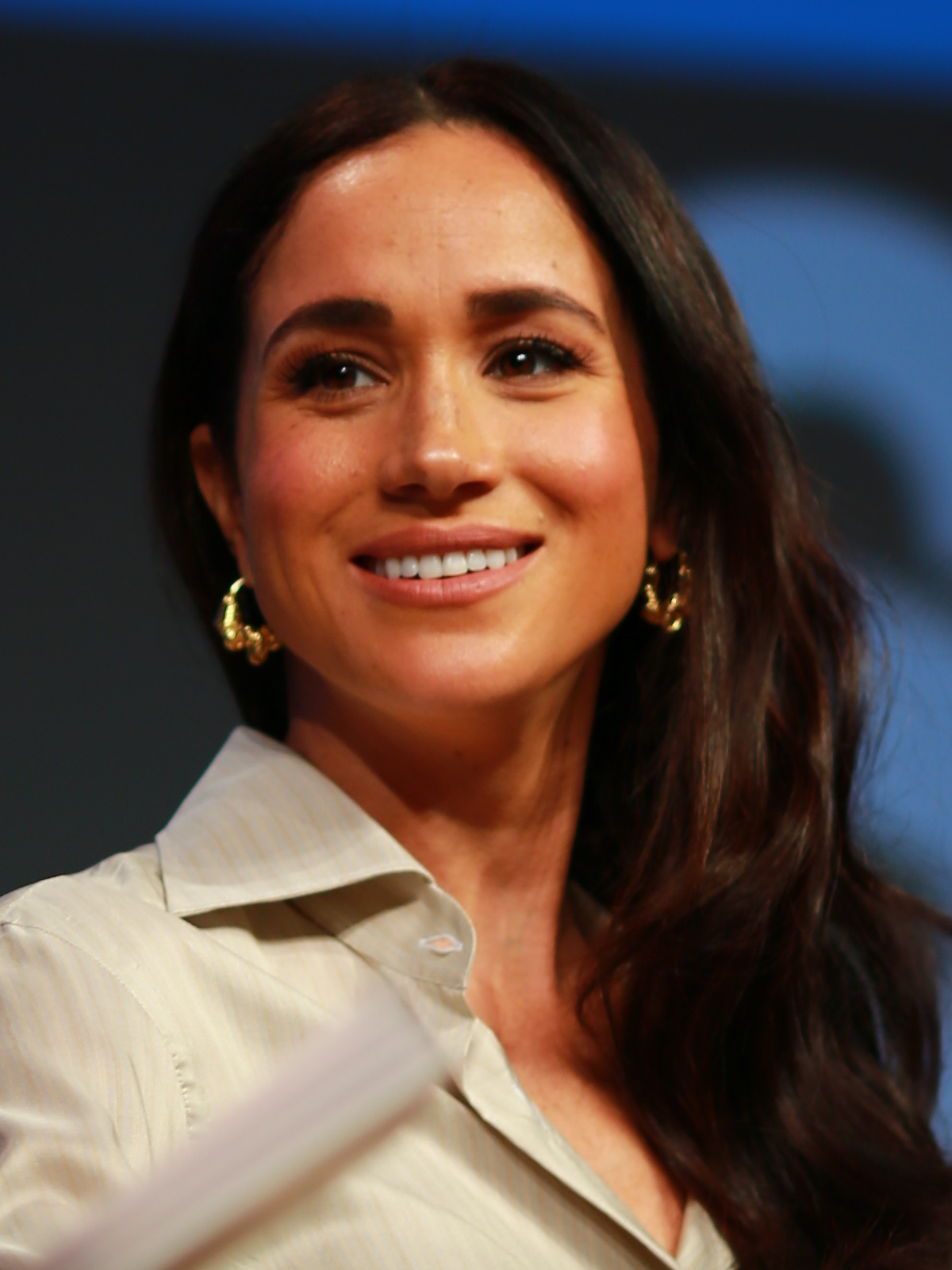
Meghan, Duchess of Sussex: Member of the British royal family and actress (BA, 2003)

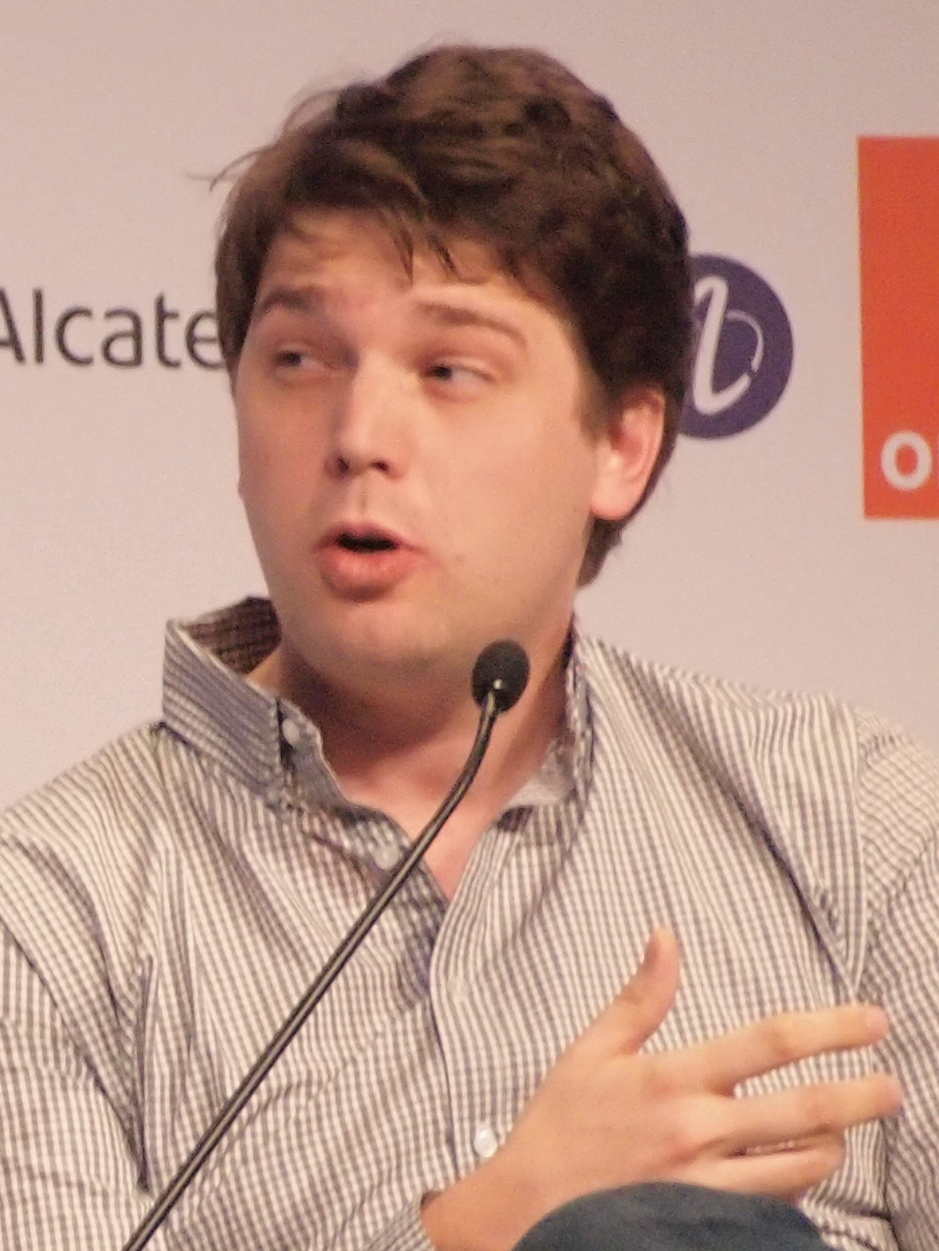
Andrew Mason: American entrepreneur and founder of Groupon (BA, 2003)

Northwestern's political alumni include U.S. Senator and presidential candidate George McGovern and Chicago Mayor Rahm Emanuel. Law school graduates include orator William Jennings Bryan, U.S. Supreme Court Associate Justice John Paul Stevens, Supreme Court Justice and United Nations Ambassador Arthur Joseph Goldberg, Chicago Mayor Harold L. Washington, Governor of Illinois and Democratic presidential candidate Adlai Stevenson, prominent American civil rights attorney, Howard University President, and United Nations Ambassador James Nabrit Jr., and Cincinnati mayor and tabloid host Jerry Springer.

The number of Northwestern alumni involved in theater, film, and television is also so large that the alumni have been dubbed the "Northwestern mafia." Actor alumni include Warren Beatty, Julia Louis-Dreyfus, Charlton Heston, David Schwimmer, and British royal family member Meghan, Duchess of Sussex. Other media alumni include Stephen Colbert and Seth Meyers.

Others include Nobel Prize-winning economists George J. Stigler and Peter Howitt, Nobel Prize-winning novelist Saul Bellow, and Nobel Prize winning biochemist Robert F. Furchgott. Pulitzer Prize-winning composer and diarist Ned Rorem, A Song of Ice and Fire author George R. R. Martin, Pulitzer Prize-winning composer Howard Hanson, historian and novelist Wilma Dykeman, and National Prayer Breakfast founder Abraham Vereide are also among its alumni. Among U.S. universities, Northwestern ranks eighth in the number of billionaires produced. Northwestern alumni have founded companies and organizations including the Mayo Clinic, The Blackstone Group, U.S. Steel, Accenture, Aon Corporation, and Booz Allen Hamilton.

=== Faculty ===
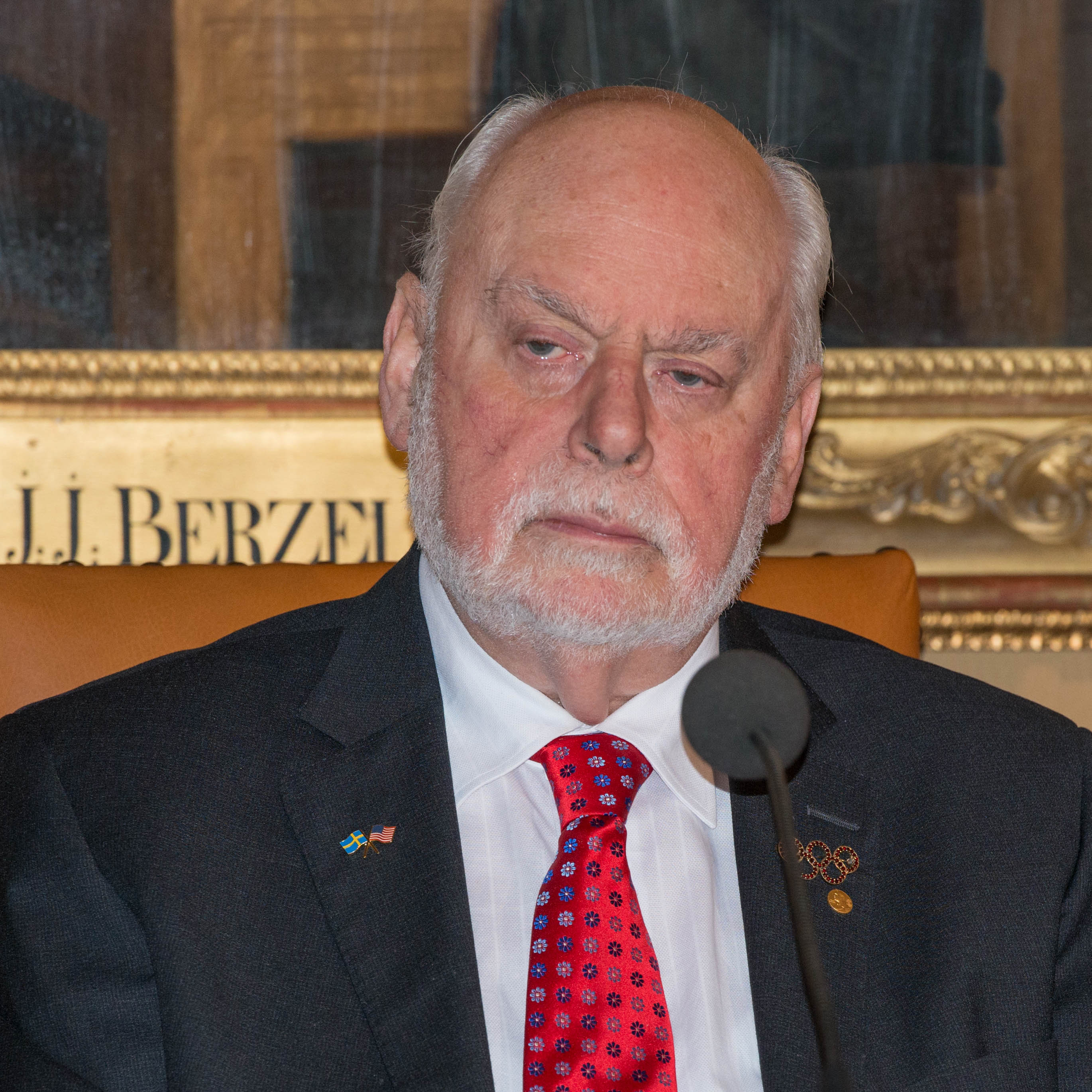
Professor Fraser Stoddart was awarded the 2016 Nobel Prize in Chemistry for his molecular machine research.

The university employs 3,781 faculty members across its eleven schools, including 18 members of the National Academy of Sciences, 65 members of the American Academy of Arts and Sciences, 19 members of the National Academy of Engineering, and 6 members of the Institute of Medicine.

Faculty include 2010 Nobel laureate in Economics Dale T. Mortensen; 2025 Nobel laureate in Economics Joel Mokyr; nano-scientists Chad Mirkin and Samuel I. Stupp; Benjamin Franklin Medal in Electrical Engineering winner Manijeh Razeghi; Tony Award-winning director Mary Zimmerman; management expert Philip Kotler; King Faisal International Prize in Science recipient and Nobel laureate Sir Fraser Stoddart; Steppenwolf Theatre director Anna Shapiro; sexual psychologist J. Michael Bailey; Federalist Society co-founder Steven Calabresi; former Weatherman Bernardine Rae Dohrn; ethnographer Gary Alan Fine; Pulitzer Prize–winning historian Garry Wills; computer scientist V. S. Subrahmanian; American Academy of Arts and Sciences fellow Monica Olvera de la Cruz and MacArthur Fellowship recipients Stuart Dybek, Jennifer Richeson, Amy Rosenzweig, John A. Rogers, Mark Hersam, William Dichtel, and Dylan Penningroth.

The faculty also includes Holocaust denier Arthur Butz and Richard Bruce Silverman, inventor of Lyrica (Pregabalin). Former faculty include political advisor David Axelrod, artists William Conger, Judy Ledgerwood, Ed Paschke, and James Valerio, writer Charles Newman, Nobel Prize–winning chemist John Pople, and military sociologist and "don't ask, don't tell" author Charles Moskos.
