= James Valerio =

American artist

James Valerio (born 1938) is a U.S. artist specializing in photorealist paintings. Valerio was educated at the School of the Art Institute of Chicago, receiving a BfA in 1966 and an MfA in 1968. His work is included in the collection of the Butler Institute of American Art and other museums.
