= History of Northwestern University =

The history of Northwestern University traces back to a May 31, 1850 meeting of nine prominent Chicago businessmen who desired to establish a university to serve the former Northwest Territory. On January 28, 1851, the Illinois General Assembly granted a charter to the Trustees of the North-Western University making it the first recognized university in Illinois.^{[a]} While the original founders were devout Methodists and affiliated the university with Methodist Episcopal Church, they were committed to non-sectarian admissions.

John Evans purchased 379 acres (153 ha) of land along Lake Michigan in 1853 and Philo Judson began developing the plans for what would become the city of Evanston. The first building, Old College, opened on November 5, 1855. As a private university that had to raise funds for construction, Northwestern sold $100 "perpetual scholarships" that entitled the purchaser and his heirs to free tuition. Northwestern admitted its first female students in 1869.

Northwestern first fielded an intercollegiate football team in 1882, and later became a founding member of the Big Ten Conference. Northwestern became affiliated with professional schools of law, medicine, and dentistry throughout the Chicago area in the 1870s and 1880s. Enrollments grew through the 1890s, and under Henry Wade Rogers these new programs were integrated into a modern research university combining professional, graduate, and undergraduate programs, and emphasizing teaching along with research. The Association of American Universities invited Northwestern to become a member in 1917. Under Walter Dill Scott's presidency from 1920 to 1939, Northwestern began construction of an integrated campus in downtown Chicago designed by James Gamble Rogers to house the professional schools, the establishment of the Kellogg School of Management, as well as opening new buildings on the Evanston campus like Dyche Stadium and Deering Library. A proposal to merge Northwestern with the University of Chicago was considered in 1933, but rejected by Northwestern.

Like other American research universities, Northwestern was transformed by World War II. Franklyn B. Snyder lead the university from 1939 to 1949, and during the war nearly 50,000 military officers and personnel were trained on the Evanston and Chicago campuses. After the war surging enrollments under the G.I. Bill drove drastic expansion of both campuses. J. Roscoe Miller's tenure, from 1949 to 1970, was responsible for the expansion of the Evanston campus with the construction of the Lakefill on Lake Michigan, growth of the faculty and new academic programs, as well as polarizing Vietnam-era student protests. Tensions between the Evanston community and the university were strained throughout much of the post-war era given episodes of disruptive student activism, Northwestern's exemption from property tax obligations, as well as restrictions on the sale of alcohol near campus under the original charter although the latter ban was lifted in 1972.

As government support of universities declined in the 1970s and 1980s, President Arnold R. Weber oversaw the stabilization of university finances and revitalization of the campuses. As admissions to colleges and universities grew increasingly competitive throughout the 1990s and 2000s, Henry S. Bienen's tenure oversaw the increase in the number and quality of undergraduate applicants, continued expansion of the facilities and faculty, as well as renewed athletic competitiveness.

== Foundation ==
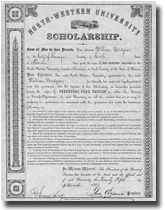
$100 Perpetual Scholarships granted free tuition to the purchaser and his inheritors.

In 1850, Chicago was only a 17-year-old city of 28,000 inhabitants that was increasingly becoming the center of trade for both steamships and railroads. The political and cultural environment of the mid-nineteenth century resulted in individual states granting charters to hundreds of small colleges rather than a few centralized national institutions as was typical in European countries. These colleges were highly sectarian and were motivated by the desire to both increase the quality of ministerial training as well as to discourage its young people from attending schools controlled by rival denominations. On May 31, 1850, John Evans, Grant Goodrich, Henry W. Clark, Andrew Brown, Orrington Lunt, Jabez Botsford, Richard Haney, Richard H. Blanchard, and Zodoc Hall met in a law office above a hardware store at 69 West Lake Street in Chicago and resolved that "the interests of sanctified learning require the immediate establishment of a university in the Northwest under the patronage of the Methodist Episcopal Church." While each of the founders had diverse educational, socioeconomic, and geographic backgrounds, they were all devout Methodists as well as successful and established businessmen, ministers, and lawyers within Chicago. Despite their evangelism, the founders were committed to the establishment of a non-sectarian institution reflecting both the worldly educational philosophy of the Methodist movement and the political realities of the Illinois state legislature adverse to chartering church-affiliated colleges.

Goodrich was adept in drafting the charter and lobbying legislators who shared his abolitionist views and the charter was passed during the first session of the General Assembly and signed by Governor Augustus French on January 28, 1851. Constituted as the "Trustees of the North-Western University", the new institution was the first university in Illinois and consisted of the founders as well as representatives from the neighboring Methodist conferences.^{[a]} Evans and Lunt initially each donated $5,000 to endow the university which permitted them to purchase 16 lots on the northeast corner of Jackson Boulevard and LaSalle Street for $8,000 as a potential site for the campus.

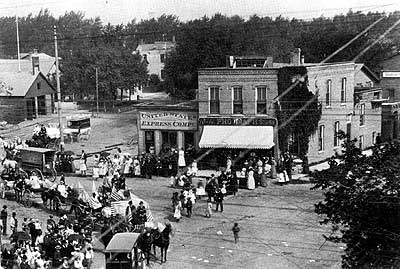
Fountain Square, Evanston, Illinois in 1876.

In 1853, the trustees elected Clark T. Hinman as the first president of the university and committed to raising $200,000. Hinman insisted that a university, rather than a preparatory school, be constructed first and that it should be built outside of Chicago. Following Hinman's recommendation, Lunt began to survey for land that was both north of the city and abutting railways for a new university in the areas of Jefferson Park and Ridgeville. Unable to find available land on the north shore up to Lake Forest, the committee was ready to purchase farmland to the west of the city when Orrington Lunt insisted on one final visit to the present location. A 360-acre (150 ha) parcel of dry, wooded bluffs overlooking Lake Michigan belonging to a Dr. John Foster (unrelated to Randolph S. Foster) was purchased by Evans for $25,000 in August 1853 as a site for the new campus. In 1855, the university charter was amended to declare that university property "shall be forever free from taxation for any kind and all purposes". The trustees aggressively used the property-tax-exempt status to purchase more of the surrounding farms and Northwestern land holdings grew as large as 680 acres (280 ha). In 1854, Philo Judson, Northwestern's business manager charged with surveying and plotting this real estate nicknamed the land "Evanston" in honor of founder John Evans. In 1857, the Illinois legislature changed the name of the village from Ridgeville to Evanston and it became an incorporated city in 1863. The university undertook a major development effort to drain the swamps, clear and grade the land, and donated or sold land to permit the construction of streets, parks, schools, waterworks, and churches. Between 1860 and 1870, Evanston's population had grown from 831 to 3,062.

Hinman was also a fervent supporter of the nascent university and raised over $63,000 from the sale of the perpetual scholarships. These scholarships, purchased in four installments of $25, entitled the purchaser and his male heirs (after the university became coeducational, female heirs were also recognized) to free tuition in perpetuity and were sold until 1867. The university also sold less-expensive limited term "transferable" scholarships guaranteeing a certain number of years of free tuition. While Northwestern still recognizes the scholarship, only one family member per generation is entitled to the scholarship and it must be specifically bequeathed to a descendant. Hinman's untimely death in October 1854 resulted in the ad interim appointment of Professor Henry S. Noyes as president until the 1856 election of Daniel Bonbright, a Professor of Latin, and 1857 election of Randolph S. Foster, a Professor of Theology. Noyes would also succeed Foster, and again serve as president between 1860 and 1869.

== Early years (1855–1905) ==
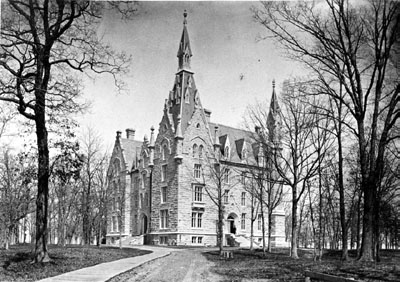
University Hall as it appeared in 1877.

Northwestern's first building, Old College, was designed by John M. Van Osdel and opened for classes on November 5, 1855. Despite the vacancy in the presidency and only possessing two faculty members, mathematics Professor Henry S. Noyes and Greek Professor William D. Godman, the first class enrolled 10 men in the College of Literature, Arts, and Sciences. Tuition for the first year was $45 annually and living expenses were $2.50 to $3 weekly. The progressive Methodist trustees also petitioned the Legislature to amend their charter so as to prohibit the sale of liquor within 4-mile (6.4 km) of campus under pain of a $25 fine. Among other early faculty members was Professor of Latin Daniel Bonbright who would remain an active teacher for 58 years. Four students received bachelor's degrees at the first commencement in 1859.

In the antebellum period, campus literary societies had sponsored debates on secession and slavery although the predominantly Methodist administration, faculty, and student body was staunchly abolitionist. Between 1861 and 1865, classes were curtailed by the Civil War; between 59 and 77 students and staff fought in the Union armies, two fought for the Confederacy, and seven ultimately died in the war. Despite the hostilities, Northwestern offered its first masters program (philosophy) beginning in 1863.

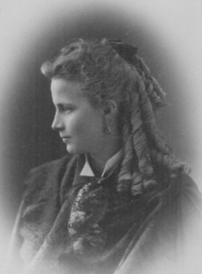
Sara Rebecca Roland (Class of 1874) was the first woman to graduate from Northwestern.

In 1869, the trustees voted to admit women to the university "under the same terms and conditions as young men" and Evanston resident, Rebecca Hoag, became the first female student to enroll. In 1873, the Evanston College for Ladies merged with Northwestern, increasing the enrollments of female undergraduates. Although, Sarah Rebecca Roland, class of 1874, was the first woman to graduate from Northwestern, Ada Kepley received a law degree in 1870 from the School of Law's predecessor, the Union College of Law. The university also established an alumni association in 1881.

The Evanston campus experienced dramatic growth during this era. University Hall, designed by Gurdon P. Randall, opened in 1869 both to replace the temporary Old College and to inaugurate President Erastus O. Haven. Memorial Hall opened at the Garrett Seminary in 1884, Dearborn Observatory opened in 1887, and Lunt Library opened in 1894.

Emma Ann Reynolds became the first African-American woman to graduate from Northwestern with a doctor of medicine (MD) degree in 1895. The second African American to graduate was the first to graduate with an undergraduate degree, and Lawyer Taylor earned his degree in 1903. Naomi Pollard Dobson was the first African-American woman to graduate with an undergraduate degree, which she achieved in 1905. In 1908 the first African-American woman, Olive Myrtle Henderson, graduated with a dental degree.

Fisk Hall opened in 1899 to house Northwestern's preparatory school. In 1909 alumni James A. Patten (former mayor of Evanston, a Northwestern University trustee, and funder of the original Patten Gymnasium) funded the construction of a Casavant Freres pipe organ for Fisk Hall. Arthur Dunham gave the opening recital on May 29, 1909. The preparatory school closed in 1917; today Fisk Hall houses the Medill School of Journalism.

Despite the growth of the Evanston campus, the trustees sought to establish professional and academic schools within Chicago. In 1870, the Chicago Medical College, located in the south side of Chicago, merged with a School of Medicine founded in 1859. An 1873 agreement merged the Union College of Law and the Old University of Chicago's Department of Law into a School of Law that opened in 1876. A College of Dental and Oral Surgery established was also established in 1886, but closed in 2001. A School of Pharmacy was established in 1886, but folded in 1916. The Conservatory of Music, founded in 1891, became a permanent department in 1895. A "Settlement Association" was formed in 1892 to do social work in Chicago. By 1890, Northwestern became the first Midwestern university admitted to Phi Beta Kappa and the first PhDs were awarded (in chemistry and philosophy) in 1896.

Henry Wade Rogers served as president between 1890 and 1900, and was an ardent supporter of student athletics. By 1900, Northwestern had the third-highest student enrollment of any university in the nation. The Class of 1902 presented a drinking fountain, but what would later become The Rock, to the university as a senior gift. In 1903, President Theodore Roosevelt visited campus.

=== Symbols ===
The modern seal

Northwestern's seal, motto, and colors also emerged in this era. The first seal, adopted in June 1856, featured an open book radiating light circumscribed by "Northwestern University", much like the modern seal. In June 1890, the trustees adopted the Latin motto "Quaecumque Sunt Vera" from Philippians 4:8 meaning "Whatsoever things are true". The book on the seal was also altered to include the Greek text "ό λόγος πλήρης χάριτος καί άληθείας" (ho logos pleres charitos kai aletheias) from John 1:14 meaning "The Word ... full of grace and truth".

The university initially adopted black and gold as its official school colors in response to the growing popularity of intercollegiate athletics and the need to differentiate teams, but when it was discovered that several other schools had the same colors, these colors were quickly dropped in favor of royal purple and gold in 1879. In 1892, the official color became only purple in response to prestigious Eastern universities adopting single-color schemes as well.

=== Student activities ===
In September 1860, a Milwaukee-bound steamship, the Lady Elgin, sank off the coast of the campus in stormy weather after colliding with a schooner. Despite being the second-deadliest accident on the Great Lakes, Edward Spencer '62 and other students from the Garrett Bible Institute were credited with rescuing dozens of passengers. Following a public outcry over life-saving facilities and transportation safety, in 1871, the federal government granted the university a lifeboat and later, in 1876, constructed a life-saving station, both of which were staffed and operated by students, near the Grosse Point reef and lighthouse. By the time the Coast Guard assumed control of the station in 1916, it had remained the nation's only student-staffed life-saving station; Northwestern students were credited with saving more than 400 people.

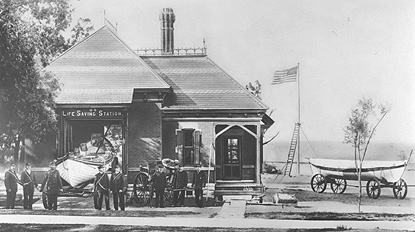
The Lifesaving Crew at their stations.

Northwestern was also home to several literary societies predating fraternal societies. The Adelphic, Hinman, and Ossoi societies published periodicals of essays, poems, and news items. These early periodicals were named The Evanstonian, The Academian, Tripod (1871–1880), and Vidette. In 1881, the Northwestern was published biweekly and ultimately evolved into the modern The Daily Northwestern newspaper. The Northwestern University Press Company published the Northwestern out of the Gymnasium building until the Press moved off-campus in 1888. By 1900, the student newspapers were published out of the basement of Old College, before they were moved to the attic of Memorial Hall in the 1920s. After World War II, the offices of the student newspaper moved frequently until Norris Hall was completed in 1972.

=== Athletics ===
A Football Association was founded at Northwestern in October 1879, and the university played its first intercollegiate football game against Lake Forest College in 1882. The earliest games were played on the meadow where Deering Library now stands. In 1891, Knowlton L. Ames was appointed Northwestern's first football coach and work began constructing a stadium at the north end of campus that would be named Sheppard Field in honor of the university's business manager and lumber donor.

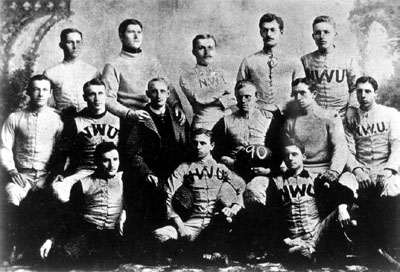
The 1890 football team.

By 1892, football leagues began to be formed by Midwestern colleges and Northwestern. In 1895, Northwestern President Rogers joined with university presidents at the University of Chicago, Michigan, Wisconsin, Minnesota, Illinois, and Purdue to develop regulations for intercollegiate athletics. A year later, the universities agreed to create Intercollegiate Conference of Faculty Representatives, later the Western Conference, before ultimately becoming known as the Big Ten Conference after Indiana and Iowa joined in 1899 and Ohio State University joined in 1912. The University of Chicago would ultimately withdraw from the conference in 1946, and would be replaced by Michigan State University. Northwestern won its first Big Ten football championship in 1903, although the sport was banned for two years beginning in 1905 following fan violence.

Men's basketball was introduced in 1901. Northwestern also had several athletics teams for women during this era including tennis, field hockey, and basketball teams.

== Continued expansion (1905–1939) ==
Includes the administrations of Abram W. Harris (1906–1916) and Walter Dill Scott (1920–1939)

The university continued its expansion through the first half of the 20th century; opening several new professional schools, expanding the residential life on the Evanston campus, and establishing a campus for the professional schools in downtown Chicago. Although the university's tax-exempt status came into dispute, a 1908 Illinois Supreme Court removed the tax threat to university property. The original Patten Gymnasium was opened in 1908 to replace its dilapidated predecessor and house the burgeoning athletic programs. In 1914, the North Quads were completed as a part of a $500,000 Fraternity/Men's Dormitory plan. The buildings, designed by Palmer, Hornbostel, and Jones were planned in quadrangles and would house seven fraternities and four residence halls. Harris Hall opened in 1915, opposite University Hall, to house the social sciences and the new department of political science. Dyche Stadium, Northwestern's fourth football stadium, was completed in 1926 and opened with a capacity of 47,000 seats. The Women's Quads were dedicated in 1926 with 2 residential halls and 14 sororities. The Western Episcopal Seminary buildings were opened in 1928, and merged with the Seabury Seminary in 1933 to form the Seabury-Western Theological Seminary.

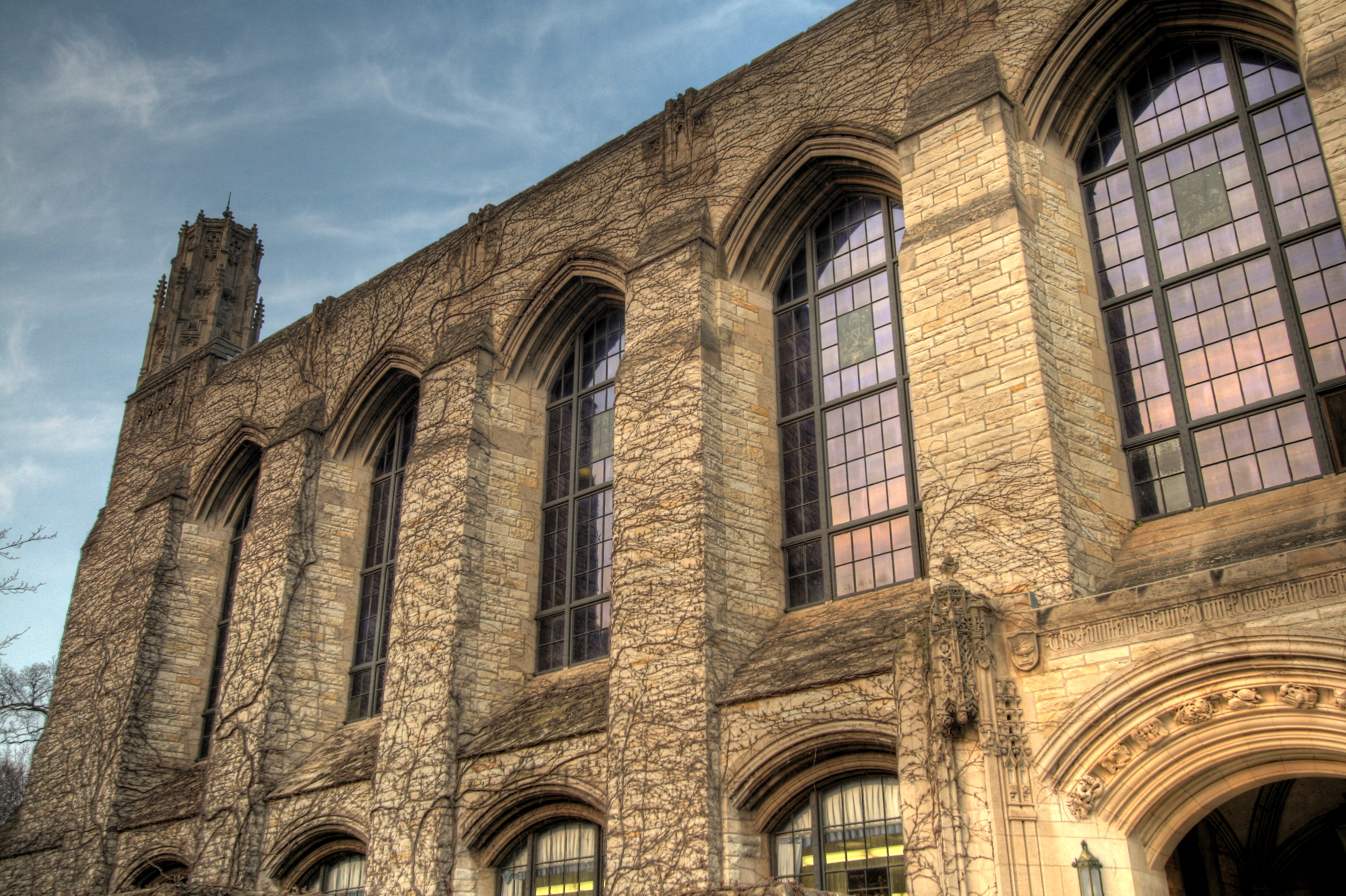
Deering Library opened in 1933 and represented James Gamble Rogers' signature collegiate Gothic architectural style.

While Lunt Hall had served as the university's primary library since 1894, by the 1920s the continued expansion of the university and its academic offerings demanded a new repository space. Charles Deering bequested $1 million for a project of the university's choosing after his death in 1927. James Gamble Rogers, having completed the Chicago campus, was retained again to design an expanded library. The Deering Library opened in January 1933, featured Roger's trademark collegiate neo-Gothic style, and had space for 500,000 volumes.

The School of Commerce opened in 1908 in downtown Chicago under the leadership of economics professor Willard E. Hotchkiss. The school initially offered evening classes in accounting and business law before starting a bachelor of business administration program in 1912. The school became a founding member of the American Association of Collegiate Business Schools in 1917 and continued to formalize its curriculum over the next decade by introducing a full-time Bachelor of Science in commerce on the Evanston campus, launching MBA and PhD degrees, and establishing the second business research center in the nation.

The College of Liberal Arts began offering evening courses for teachers in 1903 on the Evanston campus and in 1933 the popularity of the program led to the foundation of an evening undergraduate program on the Chicago campus named University College.

The Medill School of Journalism was established in 1921 and named in honor of Chicago Tribune owner and editor Joseph Medill. The School of Education was founded in 1926. The Pharmacy school transferred to the University of Illinois in 1917. The Cumnock School of Oratory was renamed the School of Speech in 1921, and the theater department was merged into the same in 1926. The Northwestern University Press was opened in 1922.

In 1920, Walter Dill Scott was inaugurated as the first non-Methodist university president and presided over the launch of a $25.3 million fund-raising campaign. The campaign brought several major changes that significantly centralized the university under Scott's administration, including the dissolution of boards of trustees for each of the professional schools, the replacing school-based alumni groups with a general alumni association, and moving forward with plans to purchase land in the Streeterville neighborhood of downtown Chicago to create a campus for the professional schools. By the time Franklyn Snyder replaced Scott as president in 1939, Scott's 19 years in office was more than twice as long as any previous President's tenure. A long-standing campaign to build a student activity center was reinvigorated by the announcement of his retirement and the resulting building was named in his honor. Completed in 1940, Scott Hall was designed by Rogers and featured an auditorium, offices for student and alumni organizations, conference and social rooms, and apartments for university guests.

Homecoming became a regular fall event starting in 1911. "Go, U Northwestern" was written by Theodore Van Etten, a member of the university's marching band, and premiered during the final football game of the season in 1912. The first university student council was formed in 1914 and the first Waa-Mu show opened in 1929. Ken Huszagh was the first Northwestern athlete to participate in the Olympics, winning the bronze medal in the 100 meter freestyle and a silver in the 4 × 200 meter freestyle relay at the 1912 Summer Olympics. The athletic department adopted "Wildcats" as the moniker for Northwestern's athletic teams in 1924. The first NCAA men's basketball championship was held in Patten Gymnasium in 1939 where Oregon defeated Ohio State, 46–33. Northwestern won the first NCAA Fencing team championship in 1941.

=== Chicago campus ===
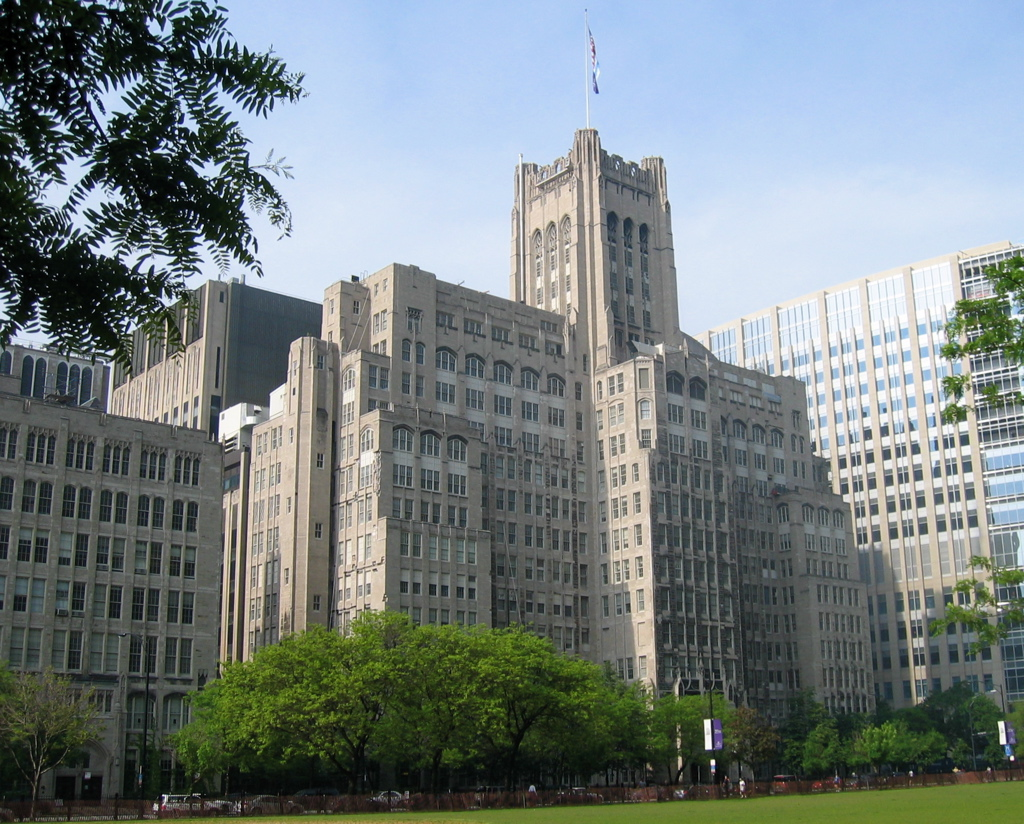
The Montgomery Ward Memorial Building on the Chicago campus.

Northwestern's professional schools had been founded or affiliated with the university at various times in its history and consequently their facilities were scattered throughout Chicago. In connection with a 1917 master plan for a central Chicago campus and President Scott's capital campaign, 8.5 acres (3.4 ha) of land were purchased at the Corner of Chicago Avenue and Lake Shore Drive for $1.5 million in 1920. George McKinlock donated $250,000 to have the campus named in honor of his son, Alexander McKinlock Jr. who died in World War I, but his financial losses during the Great Depression prevented him from fulfilling his pledge, so the university forgave his debt and the name defaulted to the Chicago campus instead. James Gamble Rogers was given a commission to create a master plan for the major buildings on the new campus which he designed in a collegiate gothic style. In 1923, Mrs. Montgomery Ward donated $8 million to the campaign to fund the construction of the Montgomery Ward Memorial Building to house the medical and dental schools and create endowments for faculty chairs, research grants, scholarships, and building maintenance. The building would become the first skyscraper housing academic facilities in the United States. In addition to the Ward Building, Rogers designed Wieboldt Hall to house facilities for the School of Commerce and Levy Mayer Hall to house the school of law. The new campus comprising these three new buildings were dedicated during a two-day-long ceremony in June 1927. The Chicago campus continued to expand with the addition of Thorn Hall in 1931 and Abbott Hall in 1939.

=== University of Chicago merger proposal ===
In 1933, Robert Maynard Hutchins, President of the University of Chicago, presented a proposal to Northwestern's Board of Trustees and President Scott to merge the two schools into an organization named the "Universities of Chicago". Motivated by financial difficulties of the Great Depression, both presidents envisioned the efficiencies to be achieved by merging the eighth-largest university in the nation by enrollments (Northwestern's approximately 14,000 students) with the 15th (Chicago's approximately 12,000 enrollments) and creating a three-campus system with graduate work based out of the Hyde Park campus, professional schools on Northwestern's newly opened Chicago campus, and undergraduate professional and liberal arts education on the Evanston campus. There were significant synergies to be achieved under the proposal, since Northwestern's poorly endowed Graduate School and School of Education would be assumed by Chicago's more prestigious programs while Chicago's unremarkable schools of law, commerce, and continuing education would be merged with Northwestern's more respected programs.

The initial proposal was so secret that the investigatory committee was titled the "Special Committee on an Important Problem" but by November 1933 the proposal had become public knowledge and created a strong backlash among Northwestern students, faculty, and alumni as well as members of the Evanston community. Opponents accused the University of Chicago of attempting to appropriate Northwestern's tax-free charter to avoid $300,000 in annual taxes, while an anonymous author promised a $25 million endowment on the condition that there be only one university in the Chicago area, while still other rumors purported that the merger was a plan for the city of Chicago to annex Evanston. However, a significant stumbling block concerned each university's respective medical schools which differed significantly in their respective approaches to teaching and research.

The concerted opposition by the medical school combined with the increasingly vocal concerns of the alumni, deans, and trustees as well as the untimely death of Melvin Taylor, who had led Northwestern's merger committee, caused both universities' boards of trustees to reject the proposal in February 1934. However, the resulting debates highlighted differences in philosophy regarding the scope and practice of undergraduate, graduate, and profession education, the relationship between teaching and research, the role of students, faculty, and alumni in determining a university's identity and mission, and a university's obligation to the city and nation. Despite the failure, both presidents supported the idea; Hutchins later lamented that the merger was "one of the lost opportunities of American education", while Scott wrote that the merger's failure was "a great regret to me".

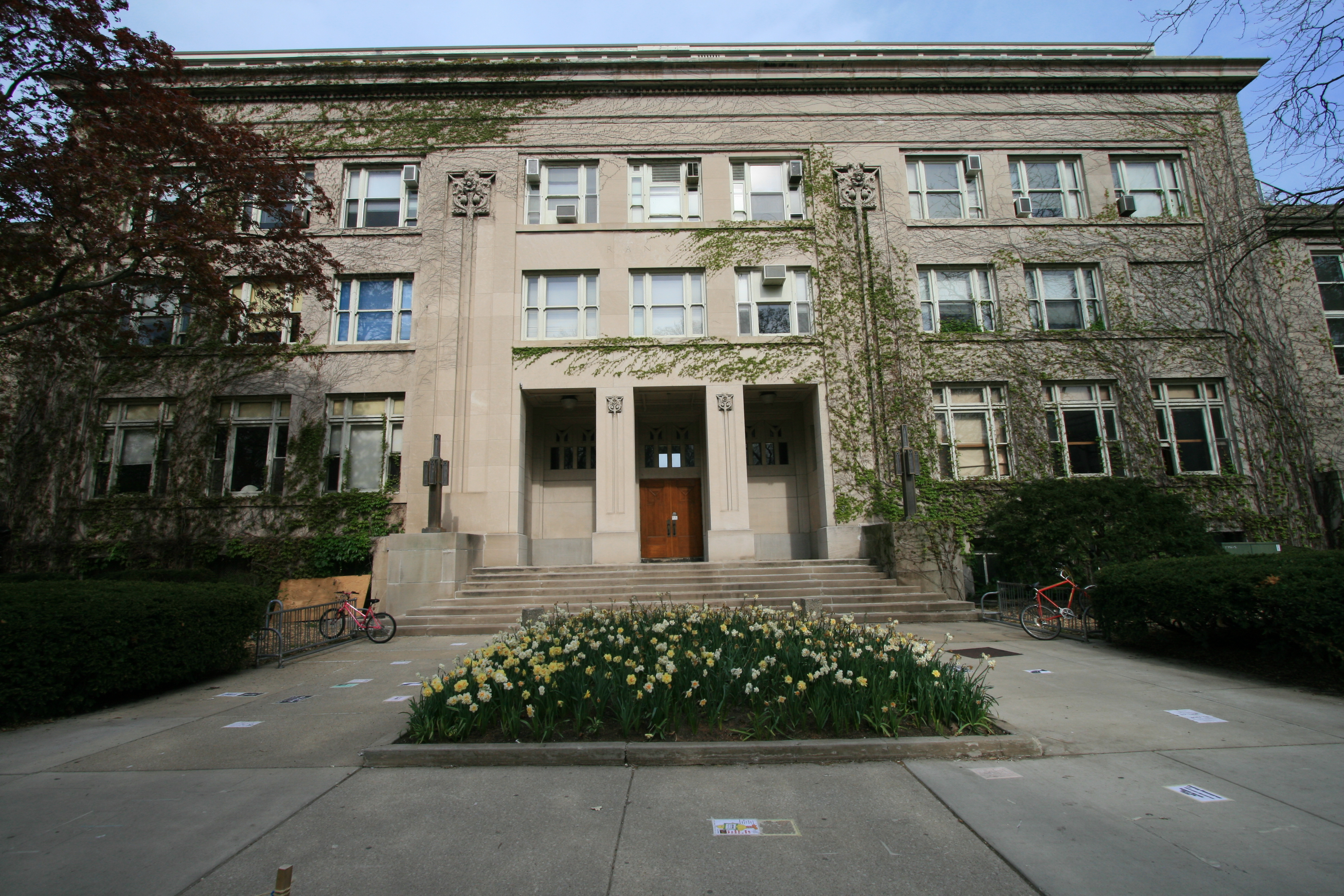
Swift Hall at Northwestern University (formerly the Swift Hall of Engineering

=== Technological Institute ===
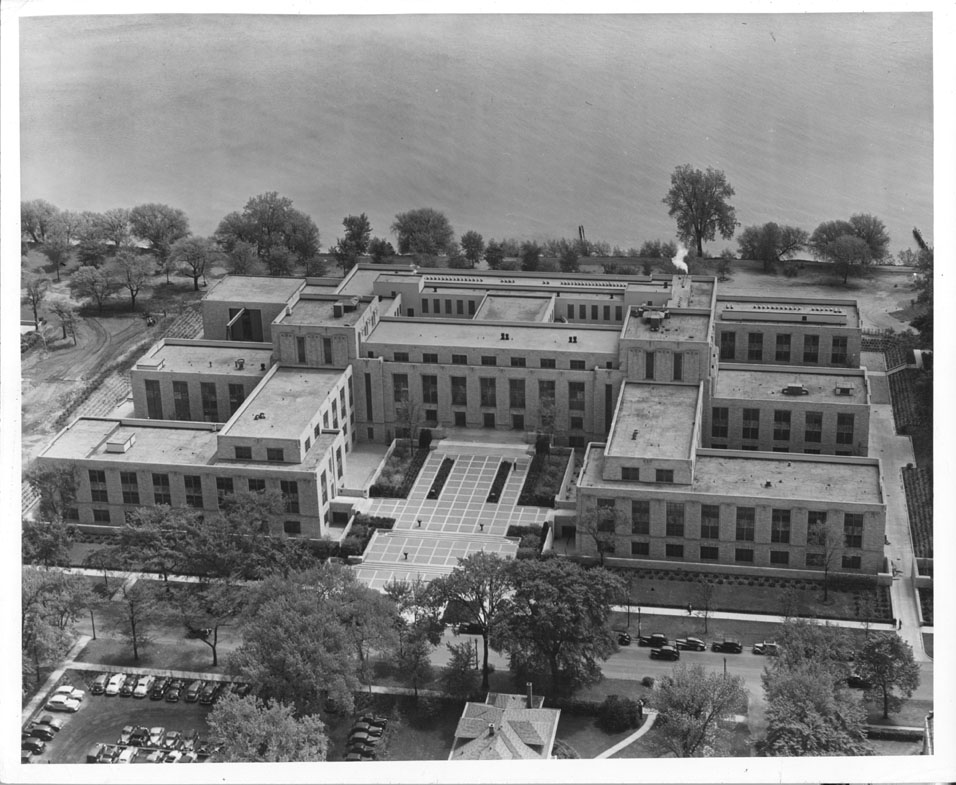
The Technological Institute as seen in 1942, before the construction of the Lakefill.

The College of Engineering was initially founded in 1873 with a single degree program in engineering, but folded four years later due to a lack of funding. The program was re-opened in 1909, under the direction of the College of Liberal Arts and was housed in the Swift Hall of Engineering (given by Gustavus Swift) which also opened the same year. The program became an independent school in the mid-1920s and expanded significantly after Walter P. Murphy, a railroad entrepreneur, donated over $35 million in two separate bequests to build the Technological Institute and endow the school. The Technological Institute was designed by Holabird and Root and featured bas-reliefs designed by Edgar Miller "depicting man’s ongoing efforts to conquer nature" in Lannon stone. Construction required relocating the Phi Kappa Psi fraternity house and Dearborn Observatory and demolishing Patten Gymnasium, which had been designed by George Washington Maher. The gymnasium was rebuilt further north of the Technological Institute. When "Tech" was completed in 1942, it contained 350 rooms and 430,000 square feet (40,000 m^{2}) housing laboratories, classrooms, and offices for the four engineering departments as well as the chemistry and physics departments.

== Wartime (1939–1949) ==
Includes the administration of Franklyn Bliss Snyder (1939–1949)

=== Antecedents ===
In October 1916, Dr. Frederick A. Besley, a surgeon at the school of medicine, began organizing a field hospital to support and assist the Allies in World War I. The doctors were drawn from Northwestern, Rush University Medical Center, the University of Illinois and nurses came from Cook County, Mercy, Augustana, and Evanston hospitals. The unit comprised 330 officers, doctors, nurses, and enlisted men and was officially titled the U.S. Army Base Hospital No. 12 (Chicago Unit) but was commonly known as the Northwestern University Base Hospital. The unit landed at Boulogne, France on June 11, 1917, to relieve the British Expeditionary Force's Base Hospital No. 18, making it the second U.S. hospital to reach France. Hospital No. 12 operated a 1,500 bed and is credited with treating 60,000 patients by the time it returned to the U.S. in April 1919. Two of the unit's commanding officers later became Surgeon General of the U.S. Army. 3,606 students served in World War I and 65 died by the 1918 armistice.

Navy ROTC (NROTC) was established on campus at the request of President Scott in 1926. The founding of the program coincided with the establishment of NROTC branches at Harvard, Yale, Georgia Tech, the University of California, and the University of Washington. Pacifists disrupted a NROTC parade in the mid-1930s to protest the collaboration of a civilian university with the military as well as militarism in general, foreshadowing the controversies that would erupt during the late 1960s over the military presence on-campus.

=== World War II ===
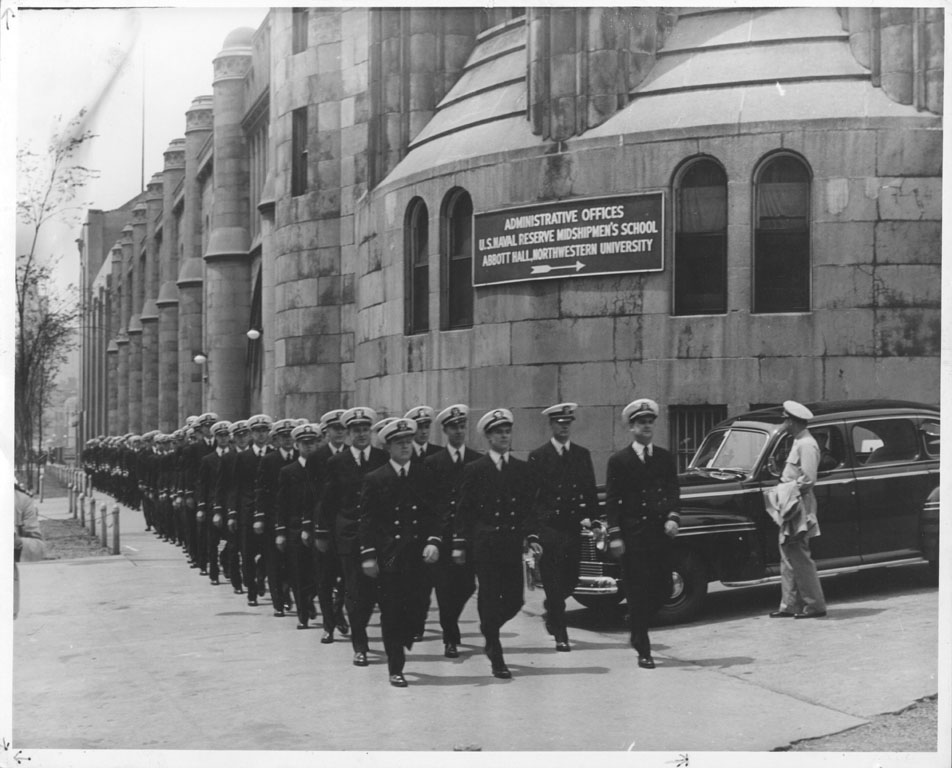
The United States Navy trained over 36,000 sailors at Northwestern during World War II.

Following the December 1941 attack on Pearl Harbor, Northwestern President Franklyn Bliss Snyder telegraphed President Franklin D. Roosevelt to volunteer the "entire resources of the University". The university admitted students who had finished three years of high school as well as instituting summer sessions to allow them to complete their degree requirements before the minimum draft age of 20. Notably, Northwestern switched its academic calendar from a semester to a quarter system to facilitate these changes and this quarter system persisted after the war into the present day.

During the war, Northwestern trained 49,725 military personnel through eleven training programs. The existing NROTC program proved to be a boon to the university as the War Department and Navy used Northwestern facilities to train 36,124 sailors over the course of the war, leading Northwestern to be called the "Annapolis of the Midwest". The programs included the Navy V-7 Naval Reserve Midshipman's School, V-5 Naval Aviation Preparatory Program, V-1 Accredited College Program, H-V(P) Medical and Dental Program, the V-12 Navy College Training Program, and training schools for cooks, bakers, and radio operators. The scale and importance of these programs led the Navy to cordon off the Lunt Building, Swift Hall, and Shanley Pavilion as well as taking over the dormitories and fraternities on the north campus. The Technological Institute housed training programs for the Radio School and V-12 Unit. The Army also established a signal corps training school on the Evanston campus and a civil affairs training school on the Chicago campus.

The Midshipmen's Training School was the largest of these programs and was established in the newly constructed Abbott Hall dormitory on the Chicago campus in 1940. This school graduated 25 classes of "90-day wonders" (a total of 26,750 ensigns) by the end of the war, including future President John F. Kennedy. Northwestern's medical and dental schools prepared 761 doctors and 478 dentists for Army and Navy service. Additionally, General Hospital No. 12 was reactivated by Drs. Michael L. Mason and J. Roscoe Miller in February 1942 and supported the North African campaign from December 1942 to December 1943 and Italian campaign until the September 1945. Northwestern medical personnel also supported Station Hospital No. 48 which served during the Guadalcanal Campaign.

Despite the extensive on-campus activity, enrollments plummeted from 19,691 in 1940 to 13,470 in 1944. In 1942, Snyder ordered that students of Japanese descent be barred from enrolling to comply with his interpretation of government internment policy, although this controversial decision was reversed after an outcry from the press and community. Over 11,000 alumni and 400 faculty and staff members fought in World War II and more than 300 died. 537 major decorations were awarded to Northwestern alumni, including two Medal of Honors awarded posthumously to John L. Jerstad and Walter E. Truemper.

=== Post-war expansion ===
As with other post-war American universities, Northwestern underwent a tremendous expansion to accommodate surging student enrollments. Over 28,000 applications were requested for the 1946 freshman class and by 1949, more than 9,000 students were enrolled on the Evanston campus alone. As early as January 1945, Northwestern had proposed between $17–28 million worth of new buildings in anticipation of post-war enrollments. Dozens of Quonset huts and other temporary structures were erected near Dyche Stadium, on the meadow in front of the Deering Library, and elsewhere on campus to house the influx of students returning to complete their educations under the G.I. Bill.

== Post-war transition (1949–1970) ==
Includes the administration of J. Roscoe Miller (1949–1970)

Northwestern celebrated its centennial in 1951, and was the occasion to launch an $8.25 million fund raising campaign to build Centennial Hall and Memorial Hall on the Evanston campus and an Evening Study Hall on the Chicago campus. The centennial year celebrations consisted of five formal convocations, six academic conferences, a two-day Centennial Jubilee organized by the city of Evanston, and many other events by groups of students, alumni, and learned societies.

In 1948, Melville J. Herskovits, a student of Franz Boas and founder of the university's anthropology department in 1928, launched the first major interdisciplinary program in African and African American studies, titled the Program of African Studies. In connection with this program, he aggressively expanded the existing Library of African Studies until his death in 1963. The library was named in his honor now possesses more than 285,000 volumes, 250 newspapers, and extensive collections of maps, posters, photographs, and other miscellaneous items that make this collection the largest in the world.

Between 1949 and 1974, over forty buildings were constructed or remodeled on the Evanston campus. Sargent Hall opened in 1950, Shepard Hall opened in 1952, Kresge Hall, Bobb Hall, and McCulloch Hall opened in 1955, Elder Hall was completed in 1959, Allison Hall in 1960, and Alice Millar Chapel was finished in 1964.

Kaj Strand, director of the Dearborn Observatory, worked on planning the acquisition of Northwestern's first digital computer in 1957, an IBM 650. The computer was installed in Dearborn Observatory, replacing the venerable meridian circle. The IBM 650 was used to compute satellite orbits among other research problems.

In July 1961 an IBM 709 was acquired from the Boeing airplane company when Boeing upgraded to an IBM 7094. The system was installed in the Technological Institute and used both for research and teaching.

The Vogelback Computing Center was the first building to open on the Lakefill campus in October 1964. The initial computer was a Control Data 3400, later upgraded to a Control Data 6400. James E. Van Ness, professor of Electrical Engineering and Computer Science, became the first director of Vogelback.

Starting in 1970, Northwestern's Chess program won eight of the first ten North American Computer Chess Championships.

=== Lakefill campus ===
- 1957 - The Rock first painted by Daily Northwestern staffers.
- 1958 - The forerunner of Northwestern's TriQuarterly literary journal is started by English professor Edward Hungerford.
- 1961 - Searle Student Health Center opens.
- 1966 - Northwestern University Medical Center organized from seven hospitals affiliated with the university.
- 1969 - Graduate School of Management formed and undergraduate School of Business discontinued. Associated Student Government formed out of the Student Senate.

=== Big Ten athletics ===
Northwestern received a bid to play in the 1949 Rose Bowl against California because Michigan, the Big 9 Conference^{[b]} champion, was barred from going in successive years. The game was memorable on several counts. Cal had a perfect 10–0 record going into the game and had averaged 28 points per game over the course of the season while the Wildcats had a record of 8–2 for the season to finish 2nd place in the conference. Although neither team had faced each other before, Coach Pappy Waldorf had been the Wildcats' head coach from 1935 until he left for the Golden Bears in 1946. NU's Coach Voight, only 33 years old, had played under Waldorf and had been named an All-American in 1938. In the first quarter, Frank Aschenbrenner broke a Rose Bowl record when he ran for a 73-yard (67 m) touchdown although the game remained close through the third quarter. Finally, with three minutes left to play in the fourth quarter and down by one point, Northwestern launched an 88-yard (80 m) drive including a Statue of Liberty play for a 45-yard (41 m) touchdown run to defeat Cal 20–14.

=== Racial integration ===
While Evanston and Chicago did not have the most oppressive Jim Crow laws in the country, in the post-War era the university and surrounding community remained highly conservative and resistant to changes in traditional social practices. Although as many as five black students were admitted every year, they were excluded from on-campus housing until the 1947 establishment of the euphemistically titled "International House" opened for black women. For example, when future mayor of Evanston, Lorraine H. Morton attended Northwestern in the early 1940s, she was not allowed to live in on-campus accommodations and had to board in a private home nearby. Asbury Hall was purchased in 1949 to likewise house black men, but a group of progressive white students also moved in despite the wishes of Snyder's administration to keep the student housing segregated. Asbury would become a center for civil rights activism with its students organizing letter-writing campaigns to recruit more African American and Jewish American students to Northwestern despite the quotas imposed on these groups by the admissions office.

In the fall of 1956, Sherman Wu, son of Taiwan governor K.C. Wu, was granted a bid to pledge at the Psi Upsilon fraternity but was dismissed after his fellow pledges threatened to quit on account of his race. The fraternity stood by the decision to dismiss Wu stating, "Having an Oriental in the house would degrade [the fraternity] in the eyes of other fraternities and make it more difficult to get dates from the sororities." Despite coming under increasing pressure after the story broke nationally, the administration asserted that it would not interfere with fraternities' selection processes. Wu received bids to pledge at two other fraternities, but it was not until the mid-1960s that racial and religious discrimination was outlawed in Greek organizations at Northwestern.

Between 1966 and 1968, Northwestern increased African American enrollments from less than 50 to 160. After the assassination of Martin Luther King Jr. in April 1968, African American students on campus began expressing increasingly militant and separatist views demanding the administration increase recruitment activity and provide separate facilities for black students. After the university rejected their demands, on May 3, 1968, a group of 100 African American students identifying themselves as For Members Only and the Afro-American Student Union barricaded themselves the Bursar's Office and began a sit-in, demanding the university implement an admissions quota, increase financial aid, construct an all-black dorm and student center, create a Black Studies curriculum, and desegregate the university's real estate holdings in Evanston. In light of controversy surrounding the student protests at Columbia and Berkeley that spring, negotiations between Dean of Students Roland Hinz and AASU leader James Turner led to the sit-in dispersing peacefully after 38 hours. Although the administration rejected demands for racial preferences in admissions and financial aid, it made several concessions regarding desegregation, increasing student participation in policy matters, and developing a Department of African-American Studies.

In March 1969, an incident involving a group of black students raiding the Triangle Fraternity house, a response to racial harassment of a black female co-ed, resulted in subsequent university disciplinary action against the students and led to a hunger strike by the For Members Only group to protest the allegedly unequal punishment of the black students and tacit support of racism on campus.

=== Anti-war demonstrations ===
Northwestern remained a staunchly conservative institution throughout its history and into the 1950s and 1960s; the University of Chicago often referred to its uptown rival as "Country Club U". A 1952 visit by Senator Joseph McCarthy was met by little protest and much acclaim from both the student body and faculty. However, Northwestern students became increasingly politically active and engaged in protests and strikes throughout the 1960s and 1970s. A chapter of Students for a Democratic Society (SDS) was founded in 1965. Demonstrations mainly stemmed from student opposition to the Vietnam War but also included protests against the draft, Navy ROTC, defense industry corporations, and the Nixon administration as well as supporting affirmative action, environmentalism, women's rights, and other instances of New Left social activism. Despite the size of the protests, the student body was split between professionally oriented and traditional student body and activists. Some fraternities were known to antagonize protesters by playing patriotic music and jeering them from their houses.

In addition to anti-war demonstrations, students also protested against the university's alleged complicity in the military industrial complex with regards to corporate and military recruitment on campus, military applications of research, and financial support by corporations and the military. Companies like Dow Chemical were targeted when they came on-campus to conduct interviews because of their involvement in the manufacture or research of war material and Navy ROTC activities were also frequent target of anti-war demonstrations.

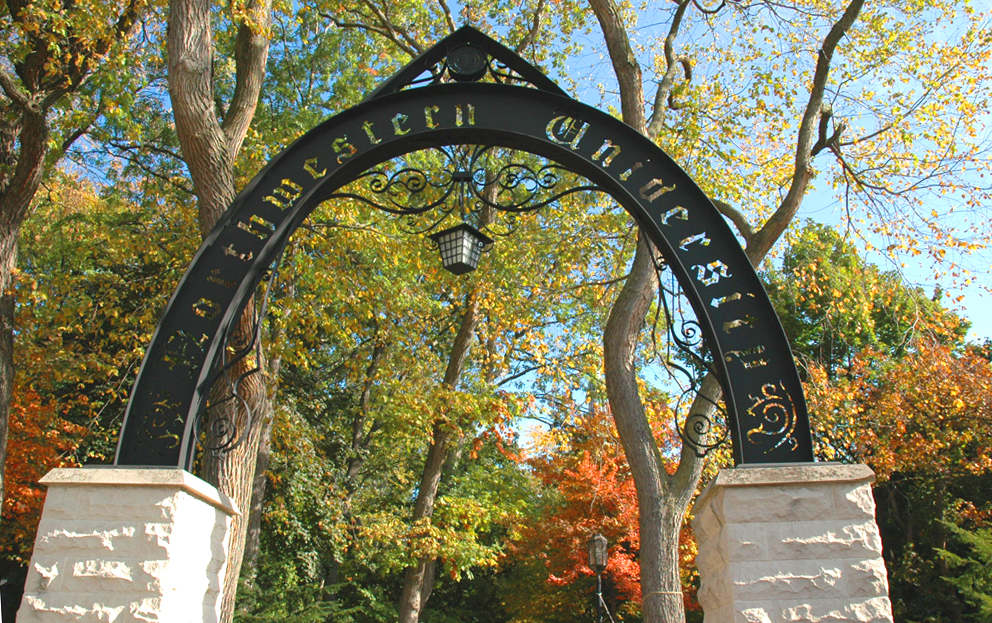
The Arch at Northwestern's entrance is situated at the intersection of Sheridan Road and Chicago Avenue, the site of the protest barricade

After the Kent State shootings, the Northwestern student body and faculty senate voted to suspend classes starting May 6 and join a nationwide strike in protest of the Vietnam war and violence at Kent State. The student protesters demanded that campus security be disarmed, the university endowment divest itself from "war stocks", and Northwestern's NROTC program be stripped of academic credit and its facilities turned into a childcare center. Much to the consternation of Evanston residents, student protesters also erected a barricade at the major intersection of Sheridan Road and Chicago Avenue, both major thoroughfares in Evanston. A May 8 rally at Dyche Stadium that attracted approximately 5,000 students and community members prompted Evanston city officials to request activation of the National Guard, but this potential conflict was avoided after the Guard were diverted away from the stadium. The Rebecca Crown center, Vogelback computing center, and Lunt Hall (housing the NROTC program) were closed following disturbances by student protestors. On May 13, a group of at least 33 students vandalized the NROTC's headquarters, but this was the only violent episode of the strike. The strike ended and campus re-opened for class on May 13, the longest span of time Northwestern has ever been closed.

== Retooling era (1970–1994) ==
Includes the administrations of Robert H. Strotz (1970–1984) and Arnold R. Weber (1984–1994)

Miller was promoted from President to Chancellor in March 1969 in the midst of student and faculty protests. The post remained vacant for sixteen months until Robert Strotz, a member of the Economics faculty since 1947 and dean of the College of Arts and Sciences since 1966, was unanimously elected by the trustees to be president in July 1970. While Strotz's appointment was opposed by the Daily Northwestern and the Associated Student Government president owing to his positions opposing the closure of campus and politicization of university classes, he was supported by the faculty.

In 1972, students voted to change the name of the athletic teams from "Wildcats" to "Purple Haze", but alumni and athletic directors opposed the change.

A plan for a residential college system was proposed in the early 1970s in response to a 1969 faculty committee report recommending the creation of smaller intellectual communities. The first five residential colleges opened in 1972: Urban Studies, Philosophy and Religion, and three multi-thematic colleges Lindgren, Shepard, Willard. The Women's residential college opened in 1976, the Communications college in 1981, International Studies in 1981, Fine and Performing Arts in 1982, Commerce and Industry in 1984, and Public Affairs in 1992.

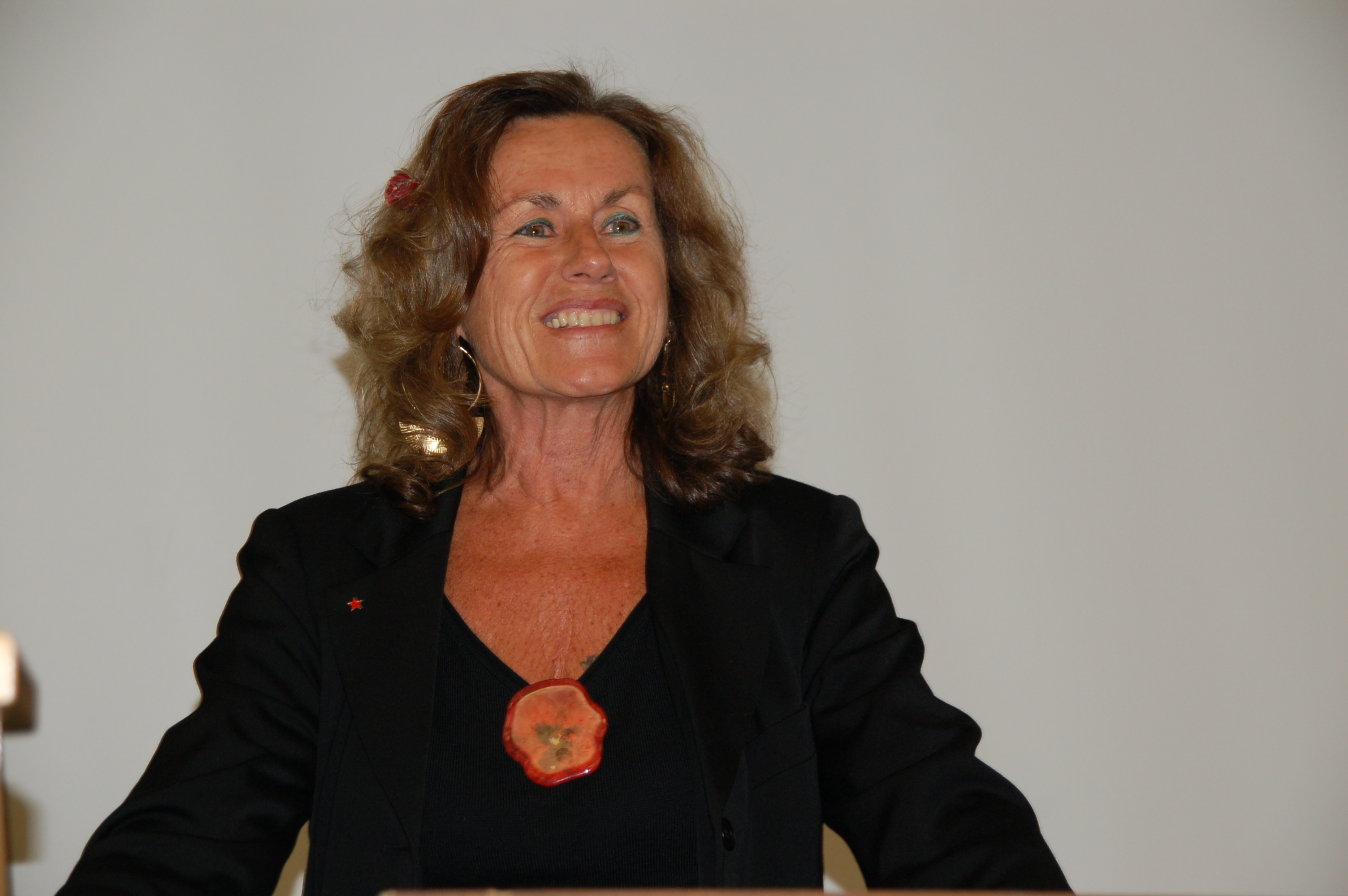
Bernardine Dohrn, former member of the Weather Underground who was placed on the FBI Ten Most Wanted Fugitives list for three years

When Arnold R. Weber was elected president in 1985, the university not only was in the midst of a funding crisis after cuts in federal aid but was also suffering from diminished national prestige. In 1976, two years after he was tenured, Professor Arthur Butz published a Holocaust denial treatise titled The Hoax of the Twentieth Century. His controversial views highlighted the difficulties of balancing academic freedom of speech and the university's obligations to support tenured faculty, with the university's public image as Butz has been the subject of departmental censure, university press releases, and student and faculty petitions demanding his resignation. Northwestern also attracted controversy in 1991 for hiring former Weather Underground and FBI Ten Most Wanted Fugitive Bernardine Dohrn as an adjunct faculty member in the Law School. The tension of this time period was only exacerbated when, in 1990, the Evanston City Council attempted to impose the nation's first tax on college tuition for students studying at colleges in the city (including Northwestern University, Kendall College, Garrett-Evangelical Theological Seminary, and Seabury-Western Theological Seminary) to cover a budget shortfall. The measure failed.

The Northwestern football team was ranked first during the first two weeks of the season in 1962 and finished second in the Big Ten in 1970 and 1971. Between September 15, 1979, and September 25, 1982, the Wildcats beat the previous NCAA record losing streak of 28 games by losing 34 games in a row.

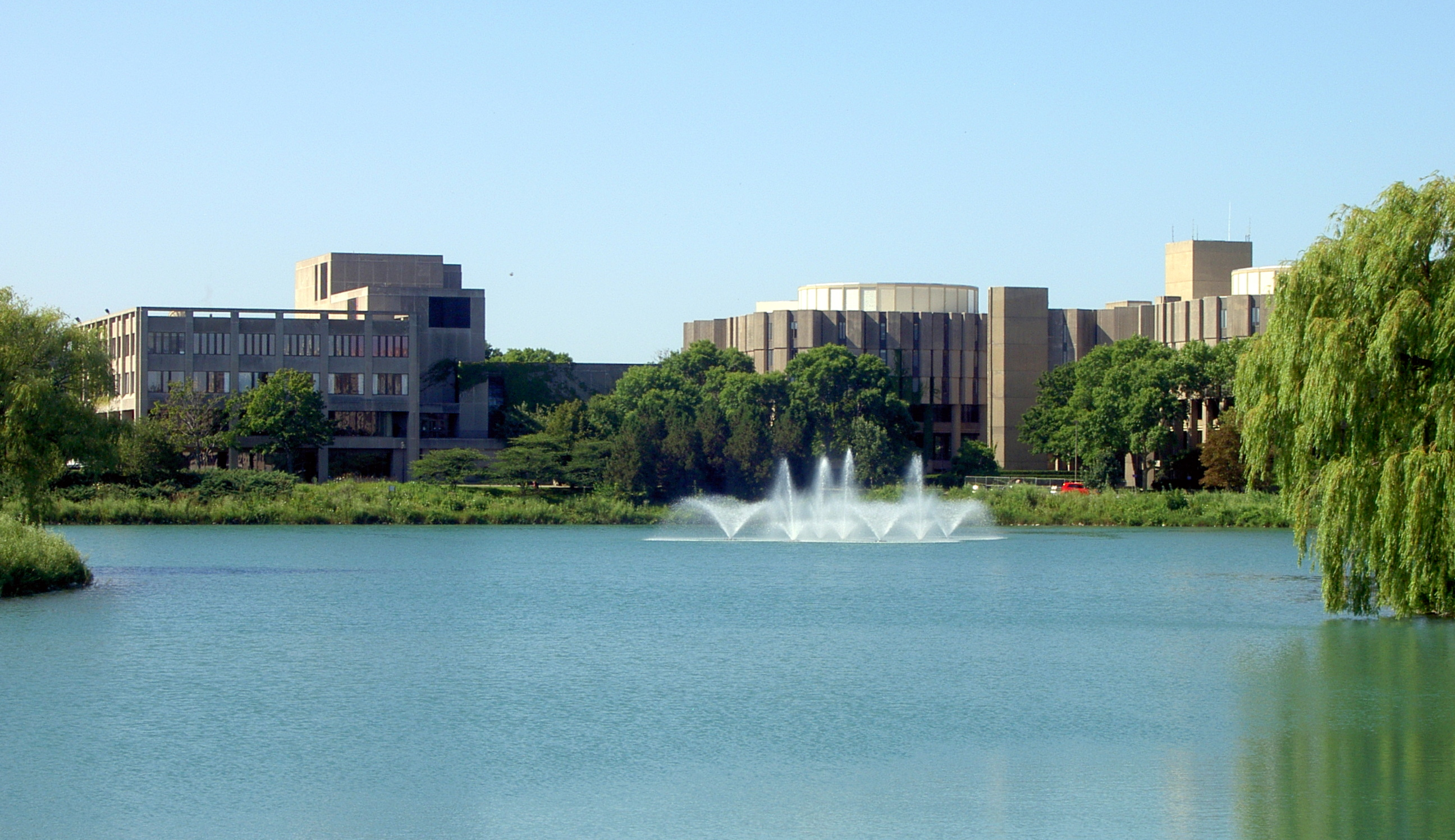
Norris University Center and University Library at Northwestern

- 1970 - University Library and Engelhart Hall built.
- 1971 - University's affirmative action program established.
- 1972 - Norris University Center, Francis Searle Building, Foster-Walker Complex completed. Wesley Memorial Hospital and Passavant Hospital merge to form Northwestern Memorial Hospital. First five residential colleges established.
- 1974 - Blomquist Recreation Center built. Football stadium gets artificial turf.
- 1975 - Pick-Staiger Concert Hall completed. First Dance Marathon.
- 1979 - Women's Basketball team wins its first Big Ten title.
- 1980 - Mary and Leigh Block Gallery opens. Women's Basketball team wins their second Big Ten title.
- 1987 - Jennifer D. Averill named the nation's outstanding hockey player. Northwestern University/Evanston Research Park begins operation. Henry Crown Sports Pavilion and Dellora A. and Lester J. Norris Aquatics Center open.
- 1990 - The Family Institute at Northwestern University signed an independent affiliation agreement. Sorority and fraternity run moved from new student week to the Winter quarter.
- 1991 - Wrestler Mike Funk becomes Northwestern's first four-time All-American.
- 1992 - Charles Deering McCormick donates $10 million to establish endowed professorships that recognize outstanding teachers.
- 1993 - NUNet computer network installed.

== Modern era (1994–present) ==
Includes the administrations of Henry S. Bienen (1994–2009), Morton O. Schapiro (2009–2022), and Michael H. Schill (2022– )

David Protess launched the Medill Innocence Project in 1999, after he and students helped demonstrated the innocence of death row members.

The Rock was moved 30 feet (9 m) to the east as part of a beautification project in the plaza between Harris Hall and University Hall, but cracked after workers dug up its foundation.

In 1998, two former Northwestern basketball players, Kenneth Dion Lee and Dewey Williams, were charged and convicted for sports bribery. The players were part of a gambling ring and received money to fix three games against other Big 10 schools during the 1995 season. The football team became embroiled in a different betting scandal later that year when federal prosecutors indicted four former players for perjury related to betting on their own games. In August 2001, Rashidi Williams, a senior safety, collapsed and died during practice from an asthma attack. An autopsy revealed that he had ephedrine, a stimulant banned by the NCAA, in his system which prompted Northwestern to investigate the prevalence of stimulants and other banned substances across all of its athletic programs.

Henry S. Bienen, a political scientist and dean of Princeton University's Woodrow Wilson School of Public and International Affairs, was elected president of Northwestern in June 1994.

- 1995 - Henry Bienen becomes university president. Northwestern ranks third in the nation in football, wins Big Ten, and loses to the University of Southern California in Rose Bowl.
- 1996 - Princess Diana visits Northwestern.
- 1997 - Football stadium restored to natural grass surface.
- 1998 - Professor John Pople is awarded the Nobel Prize for Chemistry.
- 2000 - May 31, Northwestern commemorates the founders' first meeting by dedicating a historical marker at the corner of Clark and Lake streets in Chicago's loop.
- 2002 - Northwestern moved its Master of Arts in Counseling Psychology program to the Family Institute at Northwestern University.
- 2004 - October 2, Northwestern's football team defeats Ohio State 33–27 at home for the first time since 1958. The overtime win snapped Ohio State's dominance of 24 straight victories in the series (a streak which dated back to 1971).
- 2008 - Northwestern opens Northwestern University in Qatar (NU-Q), its twelfth school and third campus in Education City, Qatar, offering undergraduate programs in journalism and communication, in partnership with the Qatar Foundation.
- 2013 - Northwestern defeats Mississippi State 34–20 to win the Gator Bowl, their fifth consecutive bowl game and first bowl victory in 64 years.
- 2014 - President Barack Obama gives a seminal economics speech at the Evanston campus.
- 2015 - King Willem-Alexander and Queen Máxima of the Netherlands visit Northwestern.
- 2024 – Ryan Field is demolished, followed by the start of construction of a new Ryan Field set to open in 2026.

== Footnotes and references ==
=== Footnotes ===
a. Several institutions of higher learning, akin to preparatory schools, seminaries, finishing schools, or liberal arts colleges, were established in Illinois prior to Northwestern University's foundation in 1851: Lebanon Seminary in 1828, Illinois College in 1829, Knox Manual Labor College in 1837, Blackburn College in 1837, Illinois Conference Female Academy in 1846, Saint Francis Xavier Female Academy in 1846, Rockford Female Seminary in 1847, and Illinois Wesleyan Preparatory School in 1850. Other universities in Illinois were not established until the Illinois State Normal University was founded in 1857 and the University of Illinois in 1867.
b. The University of Chicago dropped out of the Big Ten Conference in 1946, leaving only 9 conference members until Michigan State joined in 1953.

=== References ===
- Arey, Leslie B. (1979). "Northwestern University Medical School, 1859-1979" (Document). Evanston and Chicago: Northwestern University.
- Diner, Steven J. A city and its universities: Public policy in Chicago, 1892-1919 (UNC Press Books, 2017) online.
- Dummett, Clifton O. Dummett; Dummett, Lois Doyle (1993). "Culture and Education in Dentistry at Northwestern University, 1891-1993" (Document). Chicago[?]: Northwestern University Dental School.
- Fine, Morris E. (1995). "Tech, the early years; an anthology of the history of the Technological Institute at Northwestern University from 1939 to 1969" (Document). Evanston: McCormick School of Engineering and Applied Science.
- Fine, Morris E.; Seniw, Mark E. (2001). "Tech Anthology II: ... from 1970 to 2000" (Document). Evanston: McCormick School of Engineering and Applied Science, Northwestern University.
- Morledge, Kirk W. (1980). "To the Memories: A History of the Northwestern University Waa-Mu Show, 1929-1980" (Document). Evanston, IL: Northwestern University.
- Paulison, Walter (1951). "The Tale of the Wildcats, A Centennial History of Northwestern University Athletics" (Document). Evanston, IL: Northwestern Men's Club, Northwestern University Club of Chicago, Northwestern University Alumni Association.
- Pridmore, Jay (2000). "Northwestern University: Celebrating 150 Years" (Document). Evanston, IL: Northwestern University Press.
- Rahl, James A.; Schwerin, Kurt (1960). "Northwestern University School of Law - a short history" (Document). Chicago: Northwestern University School of Law.
- Rebstock, Heather (2002). "Advancing Music for a Century: The First Hundred Years of Northwestern University's School of Music" (Document). Evanston: Northwestern University.
- Rein, Lynn Miller (1981). "Northwestern University School of Speech: a history" (Document). Evanston: Northwestern University.
- Scott, Franklin D.; Thompson, Rollin S.; Anson, Barry J.; Arpan, Floyd G. (1951). "A Pictorial History of Northwestern University, 1851-1951" (Document). Evanston, IL: Northwestern University Press.
- Sedlak, Michael W.; Williamson, Harold F. (1983). "The Evolution of Management Education, a history of the J.L. Kellogg Graduate School of Management, 1908-1983" (Document). Urbana and Chicago: University of Illinois Press.
- Sheppard, Robert D.; Hurd, Harvey B. (1906). "History of Northwestern University and Evanston" (Document). Chicago: Munsell Publishing Co.
- Snyder, Alice W. (1996). "Inventing Medill, a history of the Medill School of Journalism, Northwestern University, 1921-1996" (Document). Evanston: Northwestern University.
- Ward, Estelle Frances (1924). "The Story of Northwestern University" (Document). New York: Dodd, Mead & Co.
- Williamson, Harold F.; Wild, Payson S. (1976). "Northwestern University, A history, 1850-1975" (Document). Evanston, IL: Northwestern University Press.
- Wilde, Arthur H. (1905). "Northwestern University, A History, 1855-1905" (Document). New York: University Publishing Society.
