= List of presidents of Northwestern University =

Northwestern University has had 22 different presidents throughout 25 presidential terms (including 8 interim/acting presidential terms) since it was founded in 1851.

== List of presidents ==
No.	Image	President	Term start	Term end	Refs.
1		Clark T. Hinman	1853	1854	
interim		Henry Sanborn Noyes	1854	1856	
2		Randolph Sinks Foster	1856	1860	
interim		Henry Sanborn Noyes	1860	1867	
interim		David H. Wheeler	1867	1869	
3		Erastus Otis Haven	1869	1872	
4		Charles Henry Fowler	1872	1876	
acting		Oliver Marcy (Note: Dean of the College of Technology)	1876	1881	
5		Joseph Cummings	1881	May 7, 1890 (Note: Died in office.)	
acting		Oliver Marcy	1890	1890	
6		Henry Wade Rogers	1890	1900	
interim		Daniel Bonbright	1900	1902	
7		Edmund J. James	1902	1904	
interim		Thomas F. Holgate	1904	1906	
8		Abram W. Harris	1906	1916	
interim		Thomas F. Holgate	1916	1919	
9		Lynn H. Hough	September 1, 1919	October 1920	
10		Walter Dill Scott	October 1920	August 31, 1939	
11		Franklyn Bliss Snyder	September 1, 1939	August 31, 1949	
12		J. Roscoe Miller	September 1, 1949	July 19, 1970	
13		Robert H. Strotz	July 20, 1970	February 3, 1985	
14		Arnold Weber	February 4, 1985	December 31, 1994	
15		Henry Bienen	January 1, 1995	August 31, 2009	
16		Morton Schapiro	September 1, 2009	September 11, 2022	
17		Michael Schill	September 12, 2022	September 15, 2025	
interim		Henry Bienen	September 16, 2025	June 30, 2026	
18		Mung Chiang	July 1, 2026	Present	

Table notes:

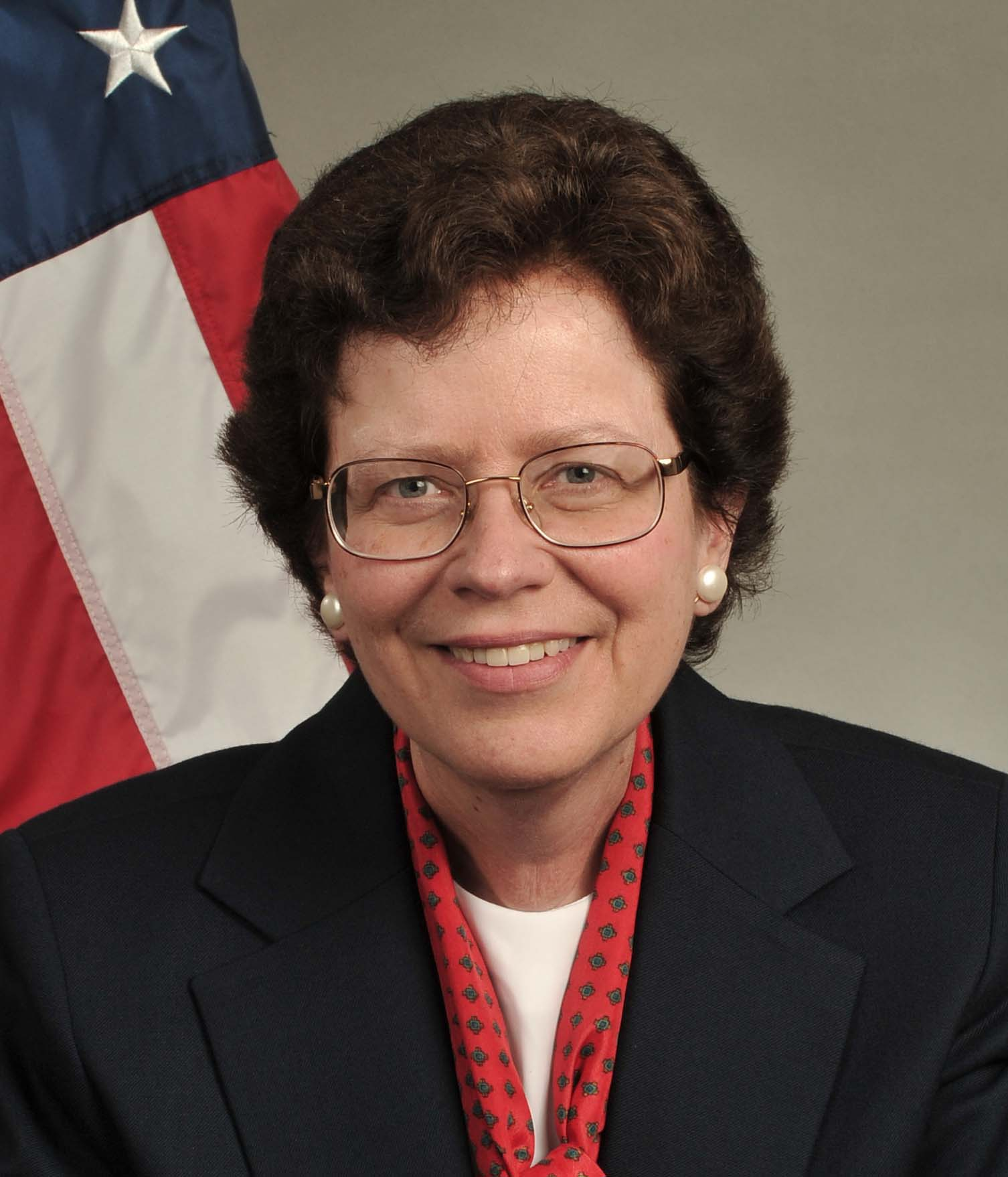

In October 2021, Northwestern's Board of Trustees announced that Rebecca Blank was their choice to succeed Morton Schapiro as the 17th president of Northwestern University. Nine months later, Blank announced in July 2022 that she had been diagnosed with an aggressive form of cancer and will not be able to fulfill her role as the 17th president of Northwestern University. She ultimately succumb to the disease in February 2023.
