= David H. Wheeler =

American academic (1829–1902)

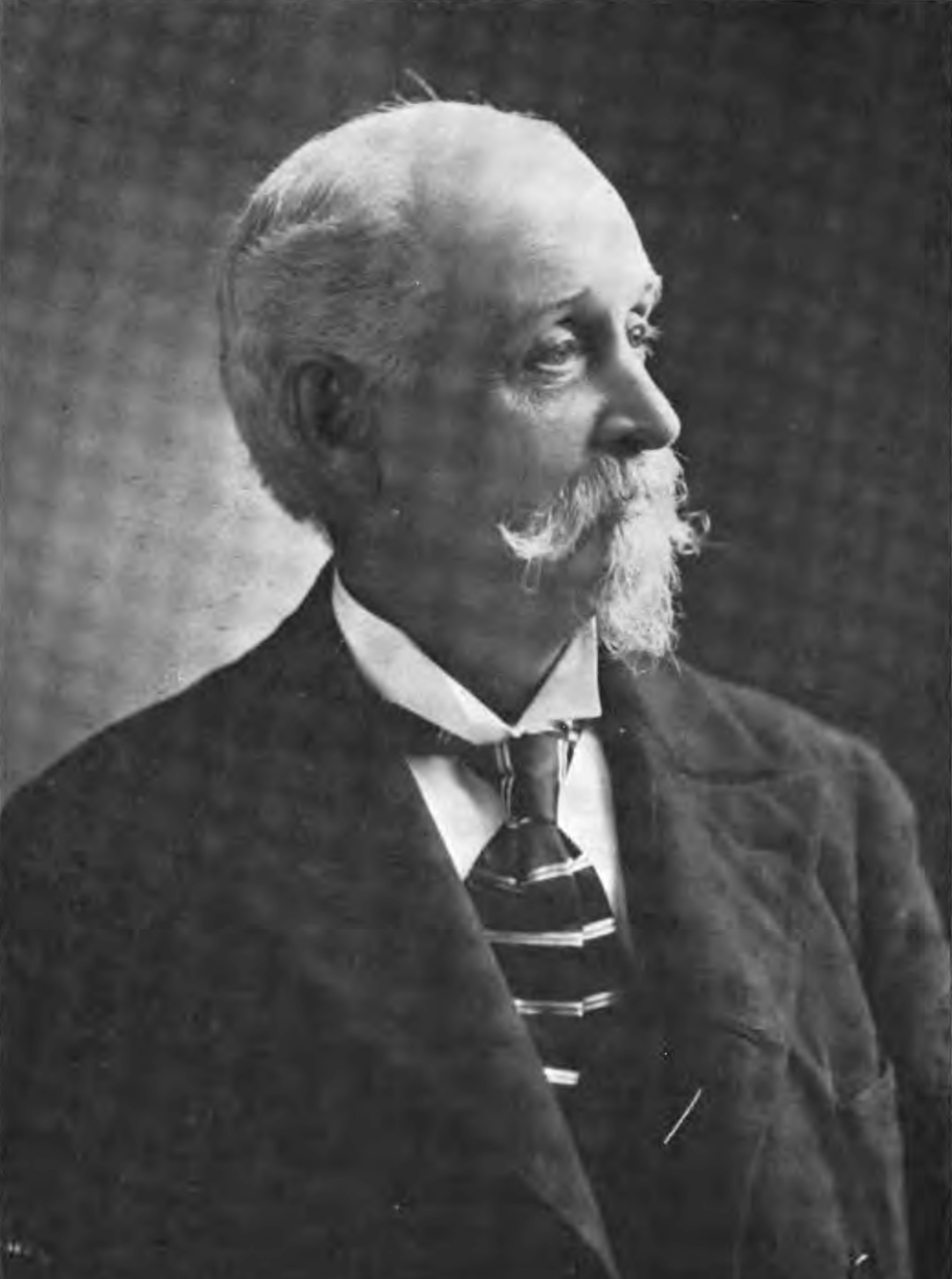

Interim President of Northwestern University
- In office 1867–1869
- Preceded by: Randolph Sinks Foster; Henry Sanborn Noyes (interim)
- Succeeded by: Erastus Otis Haven

Personal details
- Born: November 18, 1829 Ithaca, New York
- Died: June 18, 1902 (aged 72) Meadville, Pennsylvania

David Hilton Wheeler (November 18, 1829 – June 18, 1902) was a 19th-century American academic, newspaperman and college president, and also served as the US ambassador to Italy under the Lincoln administration. Active in politics, he was a fierce advocate of public education, which was then a core part of the Republican party platform. In the 1850s, he taught at Cornell College in Iowa and Shimer College in Illinois. He later taught at Northwestern University, where he served as interim president from 1867 to 1869. He subsequently became president of Allegheny College, serving from 1883 to 1888 and again from 1890 to 1893. In addition to his educational and political work, he was known for his writings on Italian history, including Brigandage in South Italy .

== Early life and education ==
Wheeler was born in Ithaca, New York in 1829; his parents moved the family to Illinois in 1846. He entered the Rock River Seminary in 1848, completing his studies in 1851.

== Career ==
Wheeler first joined the staff of Cornell College in 1853, as an instructor in Greek.

Because of his wife's connections to Mount Carroll, Illinois, Wheeler early joined the faculty of the Mount Carroll Seminary (which later became Shimer College). He is listed in the school's first and second catalogs, issued in 1855 and 1856, as a professor of elocution. He also served for a time as editor of the town newspaper, the Carroll County Republican, and was active in working for educational reform and the formation of a union school in the community.

Wheeler returned to Cornell in 1857, and continued to teach there until receiving the ambassadorship to Italy in 1861. He received an honorary M.A. from Cornell in 1858, which was later followed by an honorary doctor of divinity in 1867.

Wheeler obtained the Italian ambassadorship due to his effective service to the 1860 presidential campaign of Abraham Lincoln. In Italy, he published a two-volume study of Italian brigandage and a translation of The Conspiracy of Gianluigi Fieschi. For a time after leaving the ambassadorship, he served as a foreign correspondent for the Chicago Tribune and New York Tribune. In 1867, he returned to the United States, not wishing to raise his children overseas, and took a position as a professor of English literature at Northwestern University.

Wheeler obtained his first taste of administrative grandeur when he assumed the presidency of Northwestern University on an interim basis in 1868. He stepped down from the post in 1869, but continued at Northwestern as a professor until 1875. From 1875 to 1883 he worked as editor of The Methodist magazine.

From 1883 to 1888, and again from 1890 to 1893, Wheeler served as president of Allegheny College in Pennsylvania. There he saw the college through a difficult period of internal dissension, and oversaw administrative and curricular changes that included the start of postgraduate education at Allegheny. Exhaustion compelled him to retire in 1893.

Wheeler died of apoplexy at his home in Meadville, Pennsylvania in 1902.

== Writings ==
- Brigandage in South Italy (1864)
- The conspiracy of Gianluigi Fieschi, or, Genoa in the sixteenth century (1866)
- "Political Economy of the Fire" (1872)
- By-ways of Literature (1883)
- Our Industrial Utopia and its Unhappy Citizens (1895)
