= Sherman Wu =

Chinese American academic

Sherman Hsiu-huang Wu (Chinese: 吳修潢; 1937 – May 11, 2010) was a Chinese-American social activist and professor, whose experiences at Northwestern University brought the issue of discrimination against Asian Americans to the fore. The general condemnation of the prejudice exhibited against him presaged later actions in the Asian American movement.

Wu was born in China to K. C. Wu, a Chinese politician, and Edith Huang. The younger Wu was prevented from leaving Taiwan, where his father had served as governor, after the rest of his family had moved to the United States. K.C. Wu charged that this action was retaliation for his criticisms of the government of Chiang Kai-shek. Eventually, however, Wu was allowed to leave.

Sherman Wu is best known because of the song "The Ballad of Sherman Wu", by Arthur Winner, which appeared on the Pete Seeger recording Gazette. The lyrics to the song are available at The Mudcat Cafe.

== Experience with discrimination by Northwestern University fraternity ==
Wu attempted to pledge at the Psi Upsilon fraternity at Northwestern University in the Fall of 1956. After originally being told that he would be able to join the fraternity, he was "depledged" after his fellow pledges objected to someone of Chinese ancestry joining the organization. Wu wrote a letter to The Daily Northwestern, the campus newspaper, criticizing the actions of the fraternity. Wu wrote that his depledging was "just one of those cases that are based on a few people's ignorance and prejudice."

Psi Upsilon representatives stated that, "Having an Oriental in the house would degrade [the fraternity] in the eyes of other fraternities and make it more difficult to get dates from the sororities." As then-fraternity president Jack H. Lageschulte put it, "we felt he would be a detriment." Lageschulte also said that all seven other freshmen pledges objected.

The Daily Northwestern called for the interfraternity council to investigate the depledging, and the student government of Northwestern University criticized the actions of the fraternity. The Northwestern University branch of the American Association of University Professors issued a statement calling the depledging "completely contrary to the democratic ideals for which the AAUP stands" and "deplorable."

Psi Upsilon's action became national news when written about by Time magazine. The actions of the fraternity were criticized by Upton Sinclair, among others. In the wake of the publicity, two other fraternities offered to pledge Wu. The dean of students, James McLeod, took no action to force the Psi Upsilon to rescind its decision, saying that "the fraternity is a student organization which has its own rules." The president of the university, J. Roscoe Miller, stated that the university would not interfere with the selection of fraternity members. Fraternities at the university continued to practice racial discrimination until the mid-1960s.

== Later life ==
Wu remained at Northwestern, having joined a different fraternity, and received his bachelor's degree in 1961. He later also received a Master of Science degree in 1963 and a doctorate in 1965, both still at Northwestern. After completing his PhD, Wu worked in various space industries. He contributed to the design of reaction jet control system for the Apollo mission and digital auto-pilot for the ABM and other tactical missiles. He later became a professor at Marquette University in the Department of Electrical Engineering. He married Julianne Lezotte Agnew, a native of Wisconsin and a journalist. Following his retirement, he settled in Clearwater, Florida. He died on May 11, 2010, from esophageal cancer.
