= Alice D. Snyder =

American professor of English and suffragist

- Born: October 29, 1887; Middletown, Connecticut, US
- Died: February 17, 1943 (aged 55)
- Relatives: Franklyn Bliss Snyder (brother)

Academic background
- Education: A.B., A.M., Vassar College; PhD., University of Michigan
- Thesis: The critical principle of the reconciliation of opposites as employed by Coleridge (1918)

Academic work
- Discipline: English
- Institutions: Vassar College
- Main interests: Samuel Taylor Coleridge

Alice Dorothea Snyder (October 29, 1887 – February 17, 1943) was an American professor of English at Vassar College and president of the Poughkeepsie Woman Suffrage Party. During the early 20th century, Snyder led the campaign that earned New York women the right to vote. Besides her positive impact to the women's rights movement, Snyder was an academic who focused on the work of Samuel Taylor Coleridge. British philosopher John Henry Muirhead called Snyder a "pioneer in the sympathetic re-examination of these manuscripts".

== Early life and education ==
Snyder was born to a Congregational minister, Peter Miles Snyder, from Connecticut and grew up in Rockford, Illinois. Her mother, Grace Evelyn (Bliss) Snyder, was a pianist and mathematics teacher. Her brother Franklyn Bliss Snyder became the 18th President of Northwestern University and her other brother, Edward D. Snyder, became an Associate Professor of English at Haverford College.

Her family moved to Rockford, Illinois, where Snyder graduated from Rockford Central High School in 1905. She decided to attend Vassar College, her mother's alma mater, and eventually earned an A.B. in 1909. Upon her graduation, she was bestowed a graduate fellowship for English. She was offered a fellowship in English at Vassar, so she remained there until 1911 when she graduated with her A.M. degree. In 1914, after working as an instructor in English at Vassar, she became an assistant in rhetoric at the University of Michigan. Snyder graduated with a PhD from the University of Michigan.

== Career ==
Snyder returned to Vassar College as an English professor in 1915 and was acting as chairman of the Poughkeepsie Woman Suffrage Party in 1916. During her only term as chairman, she led the campaign that earned New York women the right to vote. She also led a suffragist club at Vassar. The following year, she was elected president, replacing Laura J. Wylie. By 1918, Snyder stepped down as campus editor of the Vassar Quarterly and continued her activism within the Woman's Defence Committee and the Poughkeepsie Women's City Club.

In 1920, she was promoted to assistant professor in the English department and five years later, became an associate professor. In 1921, as an assistant professor in the English department, Snyder, Wylie, and Amy Reed submitted a report to the entire department that emphasized democratic organization and budget cuts. In the year following her promotion, she took a leave of absence.

In 1929, Snyder published Coleridge on Logic and Learning which focused on the lesser known manuscripts of poet S. T. Coleridge. In 1930, she was promoted to Full Professor. In 1935, she published S. T. Coleridge's Treatise On Method. For her work on the poet, British philosopher John Henry Muirhead called Snyder a "pioneer in the sympathetic re-examination of these manuscripts".

She took a leave of absence from the college in 1940 for one year. During this leave, she did further research on Coleridge in the Huntington Library, Pasadena. She returned to Vassar in 1941, where she was subsequently elected chairman of the English Department. She was active in the American Labor Party, Modern Language Association, Modern Humanities Research Association, and National Council for American-Soviet Friendship.

== Death and legacy ==
After her death from a heart attack in February 1943, a fund was created in her name. The year after her death, in 1944, $2,500 was raised.

She was succeeded as professor in the English faculty by Edgar Johnson and Helen E. Sandison.

== Selected publications ==
The following is a list of selected publications:

- The Critical principle of the reconciliation of opposites as employed by Coleridge, by Alice D. Snyder (1918)
- Coleridge's cosmogony: a note on the poetic "World-view" (1924)
- Coleridge on Logic and Learning" (1929)
- S. T. Coleridge's Treatise On Method (1935)
- Coleridge and the encyclopedists (1940)

== Notes and references ==
=== Notes ===
- James, Edward T. (1971), Notable American Women, 1607–1950, Cambridge, MA: The Belknap Press of Harvard University
- Pridmore, Jay (2000). Northwestern University: Celebrating 150 Years. Northwestern University Press. ISBN 978-0-8101-1829-4.
