= Henry Bienen =

American academic and administrator

President of Northwestern University
- In office September 15, 2025 – July 1, 2026
- Preceded by: Michael Schill
- Succeeded by: Mung Chiang
- In office January 1, 1995 – August 31, 2009
- Preceded by: Arnold R. Weber
- Succeeded by: Morton O. Schapiro

Personal details
- Born: Henry Samuel Bienen; May 5, 1939 (age 87)
- Education: Cornell University (BS); University of Chicago (MS, PhD)

Henry Samuel Bienen (born May 5, 1939) is an American academic and administrator. He was President of the Poetry Foundation from 2015 through his resignation in 2020, and served as President of Northwestern University from 1995 to 2009. On September 9, 2025, Northwestern announced that he would serve as interim president effective September 16, 2025, following the resignation of Michael Schill.

== Life and career ==
Bienen received a bachelor's degree with honors from Cornell University in 1960. He then received a master's degree in 1961 and a Ph.D. in 1966, both from the University of Chicago. In 1998, he was elected a Fellow of the American Academy of Arts and Sciences. He received the University of Chicago Professional Achievement Alumni Award in 2000.

Bienen served as dean of the Woodrow Wilson School of Foreign Policy at Princeton University. During his early academic career, he was a respected analyst of ethnic conflict and the influence of the military and of violence on development in the third world and especially Africa. He was director of Princeton's Center of International Studies during 1985–92. Bienen also served on the Board of Directors of Bear Stearns beginning in 2004 until that firm's collapse during the 2008 financial crisis.

Bienen was a consultant to the US Department of State from 1972 to 1988, to the National Security Council from 1978 to 1979, to the CIA from 1982 to 1988, and to the World Bank from 1981 to 1989.

In 1995, Bienen succeeded Arnold R. Weber as president of Northwestern. During President Bienen's tenure, Northwestern underwent many changes.

Early on in his presidency, a strong undergraduate movement emerged calling on the university to add Asian American studies. The movement took a number of actions including a hunger strike, after facing resistance from the Northwestern Administration. Northwestern ultimately created the department after a few years of campus activity. In addition, Northwestern's athletic program had many successes during Bienen's term. Northwestern's football program, which historically had not been as strong as other Big Ten teams, improved. The team appeared in five bowl games during Bienen's tenure, including a 1996 trip to the Rose Bowl, its first in nearly fifty years.

Under his leadership, Northwestern embarked on a large fundraising campaign resulting in the construction of major new buildings on both the Evanston and Chicago campuses. Additions to the Evanston campus included the Center for Nanofabrication and Molecular Self-Assembly; the Ford Motor Company Engineering Design Center; and the McCormick Tribune Center, home to the Medill School of Journalism; and the Arthur and Gladys Pancoe-Evanston Northwestern Healthcare Life Sciences Pavilion. During Bienen's term The International Center for Advanced Internet Research (ICAIR) was also created at Northwestern in conjunction with IBM and other corporate partners and, on its Chicago campus, Northwestern opened the Robert H. Lurie Medical Research Center. President Bienen's time at Northwestern was also marked by sometimes difficult relations with Evanston, with one lawsuit against the city of Evanston reaching the US Supreme Court. Northwestern's relations with Evanston's mayor Lorraine H. Morton were more positive than with other city councilmen.

== Retirement From and Return To Northwestern University ==
=== Retirement ===
Bienen retired from his position as Northwestern University president on August 31, 2009, a decision announced by Patrick G. Ryan, chair of the university's board of trustees. In May 2008, the Northwestern University School of Music was renamed the Henry and Leigh Bienen School of Music to honor President Bienen and his wife, Leigh Buchanan Bienen.

In December 2008, Morton O. Schapiro was named President Bienen's successor.

=== Interim President ===
On September 9, 2025, Bienen was named Northwestern's interim president, effective from September 16, 2025, after the resignation of then-president Michael Schill.

== Poetry Foundation ==
Bienen served as the president of The Poetry Foundation from December 2015 until his resignation on June 10, 2020, in the wake of a widely panned response to criticisms of the Foundation.
