= Arnold Weber =

American academic administrator (1929–2020)

14th President of Northwestern University
- In office 1985 – December 31, 1994
- Preceded by: Robert H. Strotz
- Succeeded by: Henry Bienen

Personal details
- Born: Arnold Robert Weber; September 20, 1929 New York City, U.S.
- Died: August 20, 2020 (aged 90) Evanston, Illinois, U.S.
- Education: University of Illinois (B.S., 1950; M.A., 1952); Massachusetts Institute of Technology (Ph.D., 1958)

Arnold Robert Weber (September 20, 1929 – August 20, 2020) was an American economist and academic administrator who was president of Northwestern University from 1985 to 1994. His tenure at Northwestern was marked by stabilizing the university's finances and enhancing the campus environment.

== Biography ==
Weber was born to a Jewish family in 1929 in The Bronx. His father worked as an electrician.

Weber graduated from the University of Illinois in 1950 with a bachelor's degree in economics. He next completed two advanced degrees in economics, an M.A. in 1952 at Illinois and Ph.D. in 1958 at the Massachusetts Institute of Technology (MIT). His doctoral thesis was The International Chemical Workers Union: a case study in structural adjustment. From 1952 to 1954, Weber served in the United States Coast Guard prior to enrolling at MIT.

At the beginning of his career, Weber was a professor, first at MIT (1957–58), followed by University of Chicago (1958-1973). He then went to Carnegie Mellon University, where he served first as Dean of the Graduate School of Industrial Administration (1973–77), and then as provost and professor until 1980. In 1980, he became President of the University of Colorado, where he served until 1984.

His non-university experience includes serving as president of the Civic Committee of The Commercial Club of Chicago, the leading business and civic organization in the metropolitan area, from 1995–1999.

Prior to and during his tenure at Northwestern, Weber served on the boards of many corporations including Burlington Northern Santa Fe Inc., PepsiCo Inc., Tribune Co., John Deere & Company, Aon Corp. and Inland Steel.

During his career, he served as a member of the faculty at the Graduate School of Business at the University of Chicago and as a presidential appointee and economic adviser in the federal government.

He has been inducted into the National Academy of Arbitrators and the National Academy of Public Administration, is a Laureate of The Lincoln Academy of Illinois and a member of the Academy of Arts and Sciences.

Weber is the author of eight books, as well as numerous monographs and articles on economic policy, industrial and labor relations, and higher education.
