= Franklyn Bliss Snyder =

President of Northwestern University

Franklin Bliss Snyder

11th President of Northwestern University
- In office 1939–1949
- Preceded by: Walter Dill Scott
- Succeeded by: J. Roscoe Miller

Personal details
- Born: July 26, 1884
- Died: May 11, 1958

Franklyn Bliss Snyder (July 26, 1884 – May 11, 1958) was the 11th President of Northwestern University (1939–1949) and an American scholar of Scottish literature.

== Personal life ==
Snyder was the son of a Congregational minister, Peter Miles Snyder, from Connecticut and grew up in Rockford, Illinois. His sister, Alice D. Snyder, was also an academic. She chaired the English Department at Vassar College.

== Education and career ==
He received his undergraduate degree from Beloit College and a Ph.D. in English from Harvard University in 1909. Snyder's dissertation was on Robert Burns and was published as The Life of Robert Burns in 1932. Snyder joined the Northwestern faculty in 1909, became dean of the Graduate School in 1934, and was elected president of the University in 1939, succeeding Walter Dill Scott. Snyder is remembered as being an ardent conservative and uncompromising administrator.

== Notes & references ==
=== References ===
- Pridmore, Jay (2000), Northwestern University: Celebrating 150 Years, Evanston, IL: Northwestern University Press
