= Walter Dill Scott =

American psychologist and academic administrator

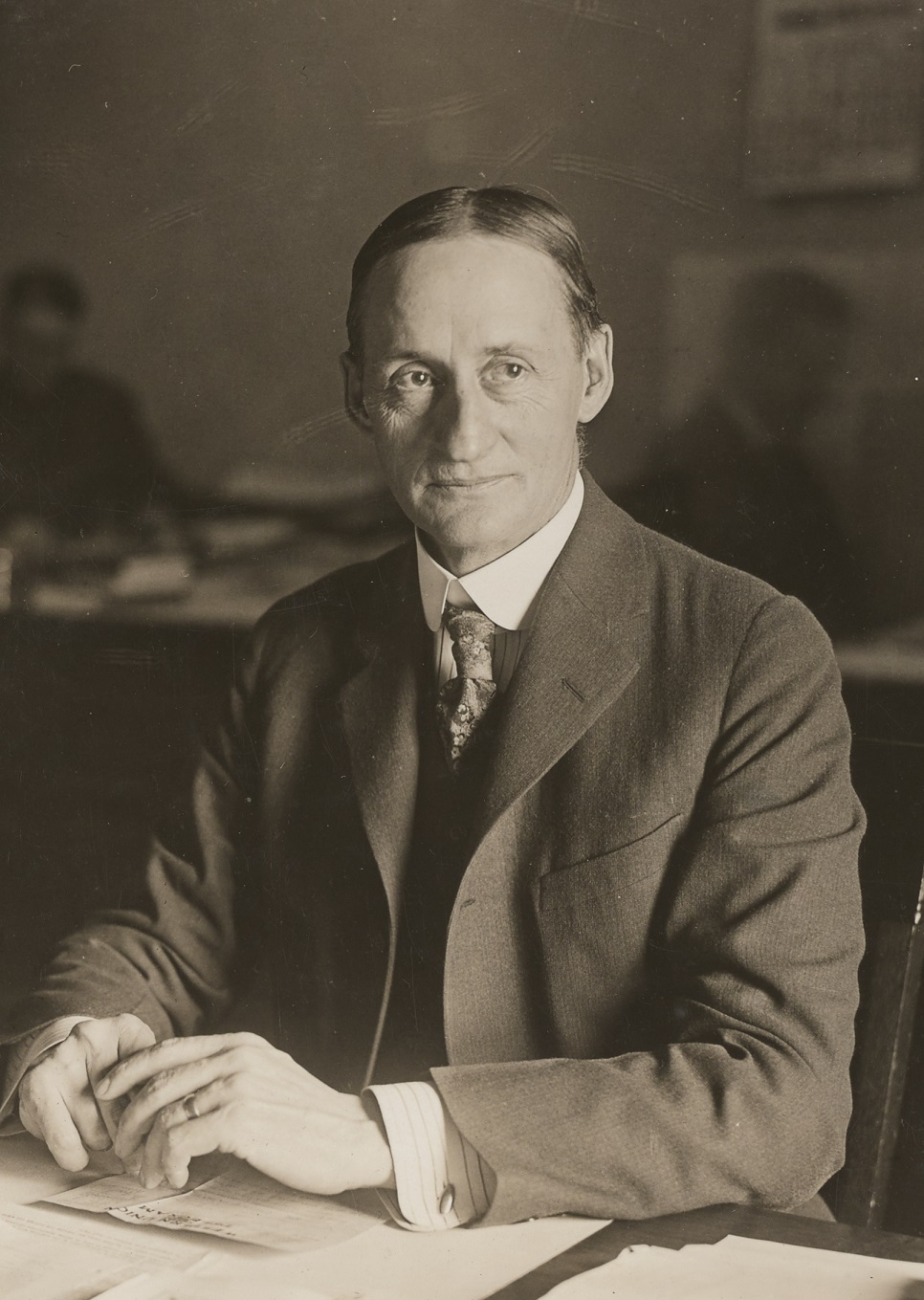
- Scott as Director for the Classification of US Army Personnel, April 1918

10th President of Northwestern University
- In office 1920–1939
- Preceded by: Lynn Hough
- Succeeded by: Franklyn Bliss Snyder

Personal details
- Born: May 1, 1869 Cooksville, Illinois, U.S.
- Died: September 23, 1955 (aged 86) Evanston, Illinois, U.S.
- Relatives: Walter Dill Scott (grandson)
- Education: Illinois State Normal University; Northwestern University; University of Leipzig
- Occupation: Psychologist, academic administrator

Walter Dill Scott (May 1, 1869 – September 23, 1955) was an American psychologist and academic administrator who was one of the first applied psychologists and the 10th president of Northwestern University. He applied psychology to various business practices such as personnel selection and advertising.

== Early life ==
Scott was born in Cooksville, Illinois, near the town of Normal, on May 1, 1869. He lived on a farm until the age of 19 when he entered Illinois State Normal University. He remained at the university for two and a half years while teaching at country schools. With the aid of a scholarship, he was able to attend Northwestern University in 1891 where he received a Bachelor of Arts degree in 1895. He desired to become a university president in China, so he enrolled at McCormick Theological Seminary; however, upon his graduation in 1898, he could not find a position. Instead, he decided to go to Germany with his wife and study psychology with Wilhelm Wundt at the University of Leipzig. While there, he received his Doctorate of Philosophy in psychology and education in 1900.

He returned to the United States in 1900 and was appointed instructor of psychology and education and director of the psychological laboratory at Northwestern University. In 1907, Scott was made professor of psychology and head of the new Department of Psychology. In 1909, he was appointed professor of advertising in its School of Commerce and in 1912, professor of applied psychology in the School of Commerce.

While teaching at Northwestern University, he was approached by an advertising executive looking for ideas to make advertising more effective. He turned his attention to this area and composed the book The Psychology of Advertising in Theory and Practice in 1903. In 1908, he published another book about that topic titled The Psychology of Advertising. Scott was granted extended leave of absence from Northwestern from 1916-1918 which enabled him to serve as Director of the new Bureau of Salesmanship at the Carnegie Institute of Technology. Scott's main area of interest at the Bureau was the application of scientific knowledge to business problems. Some of his personnel selection methods included tests to measure certain desirable characteristics and rating scales to rate applicants on necessary skills and attributes (appearance, demeanor, neatness, judgment, accuracy). In 1919, Scott and his associates founded the Scott Company Engineers and Consultants in Industrial Personnel, which provided services to over 40 industrial concerns in its first year.

He was elected president of the American Psychological Association in 1919, and in 1920, elected president of Northwestern University where he served until 1939. In 1933, he was awarded the Cross of the Legion of Honor by the French Government for his contributions to education and the Goethe Plaque by the German Government "in recognition of Northwestern University's impressive celebration of Goethe's anniversary". At Northwestern, Scott Hall is named for Walter and his wife Anna Miller Scott. In his nineteen years of presidency, Scott was able to raise around $70,000,000 for the university. Scott will be recalled as the president who transformed Northwestern into a financially stable, administratively consolidated, and academically respectable university.

He was a member of Phi Beta Kappa, Sigma Xi, and Alpha Phi Omega.

== Quantitative intelligence ==
Along with Alfred Binet and Walter Van Dyke Bingham, Scott applied the military's need for "quick thinking" recruits when developing "intelligence." Scott devoted all of his psychological career to researching methods of social control and human motivation. His interest in this subject was attributed to Wilhelm Wundt's influence while at Leipzig. This interest ultimately led to his great contribution to Applied psychology. Scott adopted an optimistic approach to personal management with the goal that humans could overcome limitations. He believed that a pleasant working environment would show increased productivity among workers. Unlike Hugo Münsterberg and Harry L. Hollingworth, Scott disregarded features in the workplace like fatigue and stimulants on the worker. Sir Francis Galton was a primary influence on Scott's writings. Both men had elitist views about the use of science to organize society, but Scott believed that habit dictated social order. Scott was not motivated to discover whether innate influences outweighed environmental factors. Rather, he was motivated by practical social needs, allowing him to rephrase Galton's human variation analysis as "personal" differences. Before World War I, Scott developed tests for any variety of mental functions that business clients specified as most desirable among prospective employees. Using his "personalized" approach, Scott praised the individual and autonomy—escaping the influences of environment and heredity.

Scott, Galton, and Binet all sought to facilitate the institutional placement of persons by objectifying evaluations and assuming that mental ability was innate.

== Role in applied psychology ==
The nature of applied psychology was too demanding for Walter Dill Scott to continue his research on human behavior, which led his focus on establishing his own theories. Scott developed laws of suggestibility as a critical mechanism of advertising. He argued that consumers don't act rationally, and therefore can be easily influenced. According to Scott, consumer suggestibility was based on three factors: emotion, sympathy, and sentimentality. He believed that advertising was primarily a persuasive tool, rather than an informational device, and that advertising had its effect on consumers in a nearly hypnotic manner. People were thought to be highly susceptible to suggestion, as long as suggestion was available to them under a variety of conditions. Using his three parts of suggestibility, Scott advised companies to take on the "direct command" approach for advertising to consumers. Scott also recommended that companies use return coupons because they required consumers to take direct action. A 1903 article published in The New York Times suggested that Walter Dill Scott also advocated for the use of illustrations in advertisements. Illustrations attract reader attention, and must be self-explanatory and relevant. This would then allow the reader to study the explanatory text of the advertisement. Scott said companies should also consider the circulation used and the tone the advertisement portrays to the audience. According to Scott, advertisements are utilized most effectively when large numbers of the right kind of people see them in a publication which adds confidence and recommends it favorably to prospective customers. Successful writers of advertisements had to possess technical knowledge, a creative imagination, and the ability to give precise descriptions of things.

This proved to be the most successful and effective advertising strategy at the time; Scott's techniques were used widely all over the country by 1910. The concept of suggestibility eventually was phased out among scientific psychologists; however, the notion that underlying human behavior influences consumer decisions is still preserved. The AIDA contemporary model of marketing has roots in Scott's writings, which describe what usually occurs when a consumer engages with an advertisement.

In 1913, Scott proposed another technique of advertising that consisted of three stages: attention, comprehension, and understanding. According to this model, advertisements (or promotions) have three stages. They must first garner the attention of consumers and help them develop beliefs about the product or service. Second, advertising should create interest or positive feelings about the service or product. Third, advertising or promotions should instill in consumers a desire for the product or service. Finally, consumers must be convinced and feel a need to take action, that is, buy the product.

Scott wanted to make the marketplace and workplace more efficient through the rationalization of consumer and worker activities, especially by appealing to the self-interest of shoppers and laborers.

Walter Dill Scott's role in Applied psychology eventually lead him to be considered one of the founders of Industrial/Organizational Psychology which is the application of psychological theories and principles to organizations.

== World War I ==
In 1917 the United States entered World War I and there immediately arose a problem of personnel selection to which Scott offered to help by applying psychological principles. Using his experience with intelligence testing and The Scott Company, Walter Dill Scott developed the Army rating scale to forecast the success of linguists, officers, and servicemen. The proposal was rejected at first. Commanding officers and senior instructors severely criticized the scale at every level. Although some of his contacts were skeptical, the officers decided to permit a practical test. The preliminary test was given to men who were already admitted and proven as good officers. If the test indicated aptitudes they were known to possess then it could be assumed that the test was valid and an accurate gauge. To the amazement of the officials, the test proved accuracy, and they immediately recommended that Washington utilize it in all camps. During use of the system, Scott set up a committee that handled three distinct functions: discover what types of abilities were needed in the army, place each enlisted man where he had the opportunity to make best use of his talent and skill, and select and promote officers on the basis of merit and ability. By the end of the war, the system was used in every branch of the Army, at home and abroad. Scott solved the problem of selecting not only officers but also men whose aptitudes would fit them for training as specialists and technicians of many kinds. His committee devised means of keeping wartime industries adequately staffed, and made possible successful selection of men for unusual tasks peculiar to a wartime army. Scott's method was so successful in selecting good officers that it was later used to determine promotion of officers and, to determine effective use of the vast pool of talents and skills among enlisted men. Scott was eventually awarded the Distinguished Service Medal for his efforts.

== Death ==
Scott's grave at Memorial Park Cemetery

Dill died from a cerebral hemorrhage at his apartment in Evanston, Illinois on September 23, 1955. He was buried at Memorial Park Cemetery in Skokie.

== Works ==
- The Theory of Advertising; A Simple Exposition of the Principles of Psychology in Their Relation to Successful Advertising. Small, Maynard & Company. 1903.
- The Psychology of Advertising in Theory and Practice. Small, Maynard & Company. 1908.
- Increasing Human Efficiency in Business - A contribution to the psychology of business. The Macmillan company. 1911.

== Sources ==
- Schultz, Duane P.; Schultz, Sydney Ellen (2004). A History of Modern Psychology (8th ed.). Belmont, CA: Wadsworth/Thompson Learning.
