= K. C. Wu =

Chinese politician and historian (1903–1984)

Wu Kuo-chen
- 吳國楨
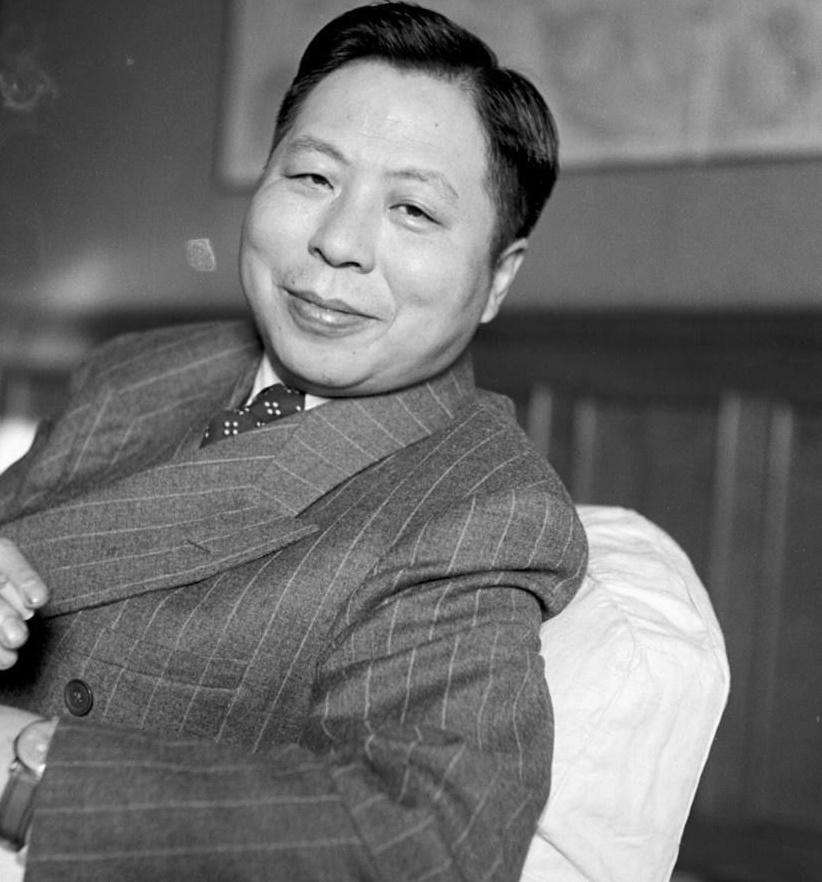
- Wu c. 1950

3rd Chairman of Taiwan Provincial Government
- In office 21 December 1949 – 16 April 1953
- Preceded by: Chen Cheng
- Succeeded by: Yu Hung-chun

Mayor of Shanghai
- In office August 1945 – May 1949

Mayor of Chongqing
- In office 1939–1942

Personal details
- Born: October 21, 1903 Jianshi County, Hubei, China
- Died: June 6, 1984 (aged 80) Savannah, Georgia, United States
- Other political affiliations: Kuomintang (until 1954)
- Education: Tsinghua University; Grinnell College (BA); Princeton University (PhD)

Chinese name
- Traditional Chinese: 吳國楨
- Simplified Chinese: 吴国桢
Transcriptions
Standard Mandarin
- Hanyu Pinyin: Wú Gúozhēn
- Wade–Giles: Wu2 Kuo2-chen1

Wu Kuo-chen (Chinese: 吳國楨; Wade–Giles: Wu^{2} Kuo^{2}-chên^{1}; October 21, 1903 – June 6, 1984), also known as K. C. Wu, was a Chinese political figure and writer. Among other offices, he served as Mayor of Shanghai and as Chairman of the Taiwan Provincial Government.

== Early life ==
Wu was born in Jianshi County, Hubei, and grew up in Beijing, where his father served in the military. He studied at both Tianjin Nankai High School, where Zhou Enlai was a classmate, and at Tsinghua University. In 1923, he earned a bachelor's degree in economics from Grinnell College and, in 1926, a doctoral degree in political science from Princeton University.

== Early career ==
After returning to China in 1926, Wu began a career in government service, first as a tax collector in Hankou, today part of Wuhan, for the local warlord Xia Douyin. In 1931, he married Edith Huang, daughter of Gene T. Huang. They eventually had four children: Eileen, Edith, Kuo-chen, and Sherman. In 1932, he became mayor of Hankou. When the Yangtze River appeared ready to flood in 1936, Wu oversaw the construction of a huge dike system which saved the city.

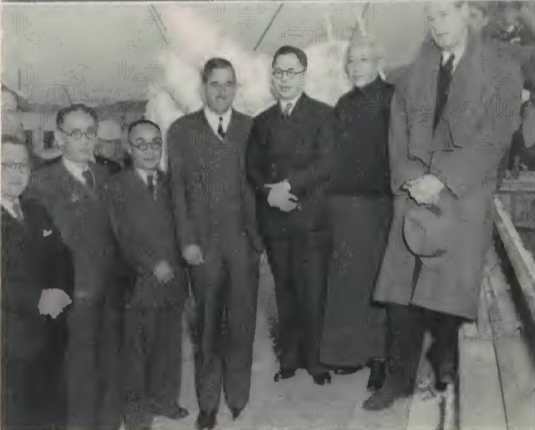
Wu with John M. Cabot (center), US Consul General in Shanghai in 1948

With the fall of Hankou to Japanese forces in October 1938 during the Second Sino-Japanese War, Wu and his family fled to Chongqing. In 1939, Chiang Kai-shek appointed him as mayor of Chongqing, a position he held until 1942. He served as vice minister of Foreign Affairs from 1943 to 1945, interacting with Zhou Enlai as part of the united front against the Japanese. After the end of World War II in 1945, K.C. Wu became mayor of Shanghai, serving in that role until the Chinese Communists conquered the city in 1949. While mayor of Shanghai, Wu met Robert R. McCormick of the Chicago Tribune, and his wife Maryland. As the situation in Shanghai became less stable, Wu sent his two daughters to live with the McCormicks in Illinois.

== Activities after leaving mainland China ==
Following the relocation of the Nationalist government to Taipei, Wu served as Governor of Taiwan from 1949 to 1953. Wu attempted to bring a greater degree of self-governance to the Taiwanese people, allowing for the election of certain local officials by popular vote. Wu also brought critics of Chen Yi into the government, and attempted to cut back on police brutality. Wu was opposed by many conservative members of the Nationalist government, including Chiang Ching-kuo and Chen Cheng.

Soong Meiling (Madame Chiang) was once a close friend of K.C. Wu, and during the 1950s, she strongly supported and helped secure positions of power for ROC officials educated like she was in the United States. Some of the Western-educated officials (including K. C. Wu, George Yeh and Sun Li-jen) saw her absence from the sixth congress of the KMT in 1952 as unfavorable news, and she was soon ousted from their party's central committee in party elections. Meiling repeatedly tried to persuade Wu to remain in Taiwan, with limited success, even offering him a $10,000 job as her secretary for six months, and when pressed, he told her of an incident when an executive from the Taiwan Match Company being arrested and falsely charged with being a Communist. Later Meiling openly demanded whether or not her husband Chiang Kai-shek knew what Chiang Ching-kuo had been doing with his secret police, and abruptly left the lunch with Wu and his wife. At Wu's request, Meiling also helped him and his wife secure passports for the United States shortly afterwards, but at first she claimed she "could not do anything" for their teenage son, after they had relocated to America and wrote her three times requesting further assistance.

Wu's conflict with the younger Chiang meanwhile had worsened. Wu submitted his resignation to the elder Chiang but it was rejected. In April 1952, an alleged assassination targeting Wu was suspected. In April 1953, he resigned from his position as governor, and on 24 May he hastily left Taiwan on a "lecture tour". Wu's family left for the United States, except one son who was not permitted to leave by the Chiangs. In 1954, a wave of accusations appeared in Taiwan alleging Wu's corruption. At the same time, the Chiangs moved to dismiss Wu's associates from government. They also formally expelled Wu from the Kuomintang. It was also said that Madame Chiang managed to convince Chiang Kai-shek not to go through with another assassination attempt on K. C. Wu on his way to the Taiwanese airport, insisting that such a murder would have "severe repercussions" on U.S.-Taiwan relations.

Following his son's departure from Taiwan, Wu began to speak out against what he saw were serious problems with the Kuomintang (KMT) government. That same year, Wu wrote an article in Look magazine entitled "Your Money is Building a Police State in Taiwan". The war of words between Wu and Chiang's regime escalated further, including a resolution against him by the ROC's National Assembly. Later in 1954, a war of words also erupted between Wu and Hu Shih, who was also in the United States at the time.

At that time, the United States was attempting to forge an alliance with the government on Taiwan, as well as focused on other fronts in the Cold War. Thus, the idea of fighting the KMT's police state was low on the United States agenda. Following a lack of American response to his writings, K.C. Wu lived in the United States where he served as professor of Chinese history at Armstrong Atlantic State University in Savannah, Georgia. He published several books in the US, including The Lane of Eternal Stability, a novel based on him and his high school classmate Zhou Enlai, and The Chinese Heritage, a treatise on Chinese mythology and history.

Wu is remembered mainly for his vital role in the formation of a liberal modern Taiwan and his anti-communist beliefs typical of KMT members, but he is also remembered for his outspoken anti-Kuomintang rhetoric and turbulent disagreements with the more Russian-styled Chiang Ching-kuo. After the Great Retreat, there were pro-American liberals in the Kuomintang, but as Chiang Ching-kuo took control of party, military, and administrative powers and, as a result, pro-American elements like K. C. Wu or Wang Shijie were expelled.

== See also ==
- Liberalism in China

== Notes ==
Political offices
Preceded by He Guoguang	Mayor of Chongqing; 1939–1942	Succeeded by He Yaozu
Preceded by Zhou Fohai	Mayor of Shanghai; 1945-1949	Succeeded by Chen Yi
Preceded by Chen Cheng	Governor of Taiwan; 1949–1953	Succeeded by Yu Horng-jiun
