= Clark T. Hinman =

American college president (1819–1854)

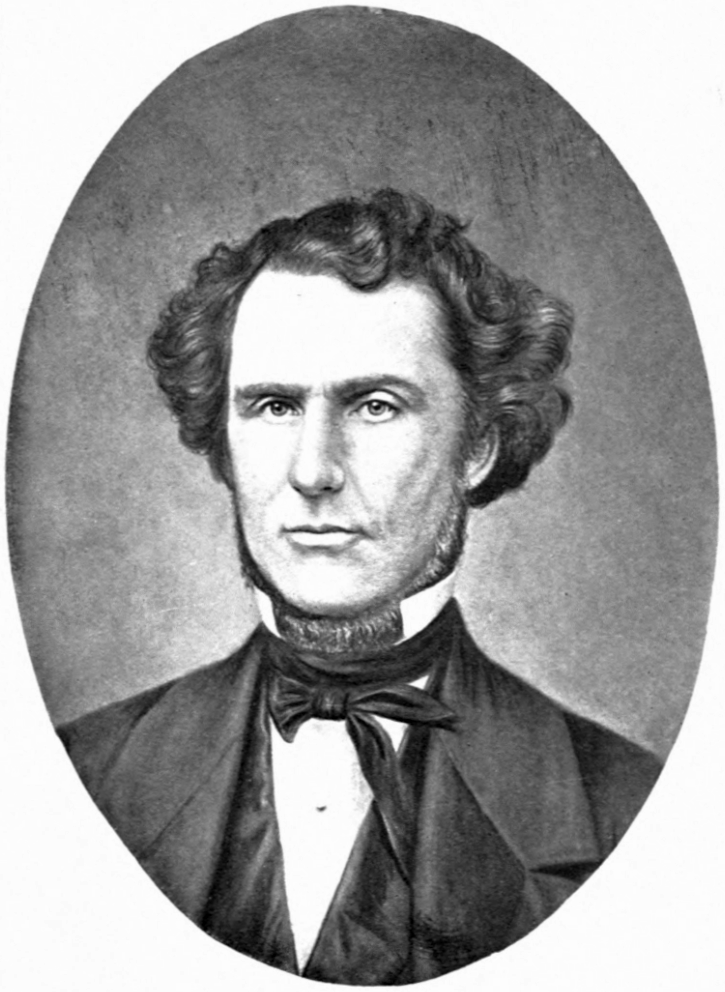

1st President of Northwestern University
- In office 1854–1854
- Preceded by: office established
- Succeeded by: Randolph Sinks Foster; Henry Sanborn Noyes (interim)

2nd President of Albion College
- In office 1846–1853
- Preceded by: Charles Franklin Stockwell
- Succeeded by: Ira Mayhew

Personal details
- Born: Clark Titus Hinman; August 3, 1819 Kortright, New York, US
- Died: October 21, 1854 (aged 35) Troy, New York, US
- Resting place: Oxbow Cemetery, Newbury, Vermont
- Education: Wesleyan University
- Profession: Academic administrator and educator

Clark Titus Hinman (August 3, 1819 – October 21, 1854) was an American academic administrator and Methodist minister. He was the first president of Northwestern University and the second president of Albion College. Hinman was also one of the founders of the Eclectic Society.

== Early life ==
Hinman was born on August 3, 1819, in Kortright, New York. His parents were Electa Clark and Aman Hinman.

He joined the Methodist Episcopal Church when he was ten years old. He attended the Cazenovia Seminary in Cazenovia, New York. He received a license from the Vermont Conference of the Methodist Episcopal Church to be a minister when he was nineteen years old.

He attended Wesleyan University, graduating in 1839. While there, he was one of the co-founders of the Eclectic Society fraternity.

== Career ==
Hinman was an instructor at the Newberry Seminary in Newbury, Vermont in 1839. He taught Greek and mathematics. He was principal of the seminary from 1844 to 1846.

In 1846, he left Newbury and went to the Wesleyan Seminary in Albion, Michigan, which later became Albion College, where he taught Belles-lettres and moral and intellectual science and served as its principal (president) from 1846 to 1853. He oversaw the admission of female students to the renamed Albion Female Collegiate Institute and Wesleyan Seminary. He was also editor of the Newbury Biblical Magazine.

Hinman joined the board of trustees of the future Northwestern University in 1951. He was unanimously elected the first president of Northwestern University by the board of trustees on August 23, 1853. Hinman began working on plans for the university, including land acquisition for the campus, establishing an endowment, and starting its related preparatory school. He was very active in fundraising for the construction of the campus, shaping the college's curriculum, and hiring its faculty. However, he died before instruction at the new university began.

== Honors ==
Hinman received a doctor of divinity degree from Ohio Wesleyan University in 1851. Northwestern University's first student organization, the Hinman Literary Society, was named in his honor. The university's Hinman House residence was named in his honor, as was Hinman Avenue in Evanston, Illinois.

== Personal life ==
Hinman married Martha A. Morse Hinman. She taught piano forte at Newbury Seminary. They had three children.

In October 1854, Hinman fell ill and traveled from Illinois to Vermont to recover and see his family. He died from typhoid fever and choleric dysentery in Troy, New York on October 21, 1854, at the age of 35 years. Hinman was buried in Oxbow Cemetery in Newbury, Vermont.
