= Morton Schapiro =

American economist

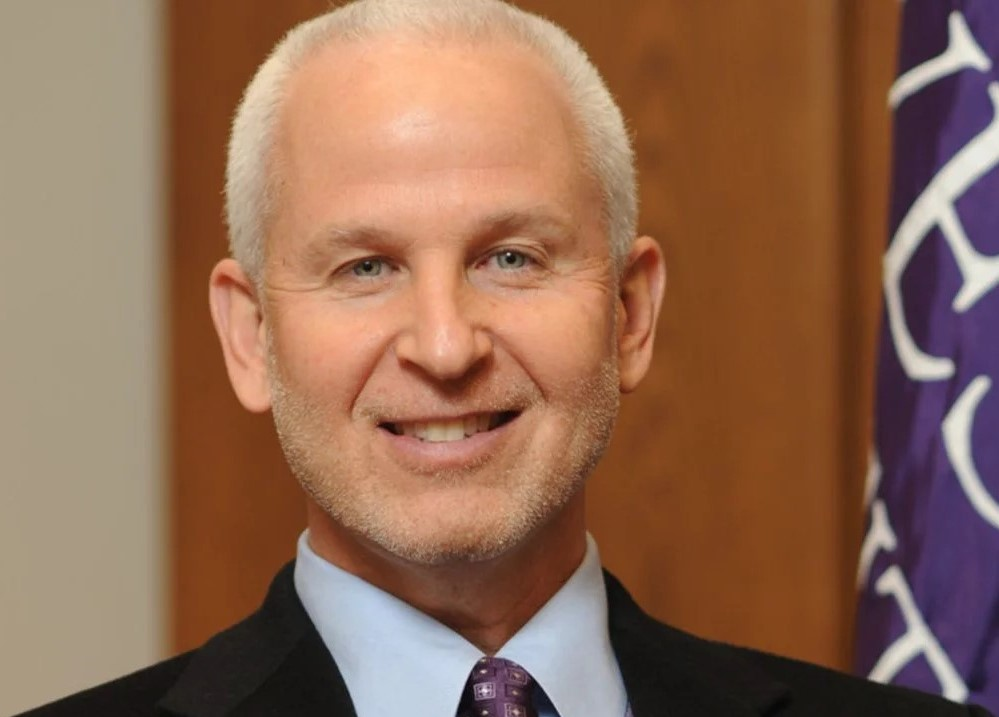
- Schapiro c. 2008

16th President of Northwestern University
- In office September 1, 2009 – September 12, 2022
- Preceded by: Henry Bienen
- Succeeded by: Michael Schill

16th President of Williams College
- In office 2000–2009
- Preceded by: Carl W. Vogt
- Succeeded by: William G. Wagner

Personal details
- Born: July 13, 1953 (age 72) Newark, New Jersey, U.S.
- Education: Hofstra University (BS); University of Pennsylvania (MA, PhD)

Morton Owen Schapiro (born July 13, 1953) is an American economist who served as the 16th president of Northwestern University from 2009 to 2022.

Schapiro previously served as president of Williams College in Massachusetts from 2000 to 2009, vice president for planning of the University of Southern California from 1998 to 2000, and dean of the University of Southern California College of Letters, Arts and Sciences from 1994 to 2000.

== Early life and education ==
Schapiro spent his childhood in New Jersey and was raised in a Jewish family.

Schapiro received a Bachelor of Science magna cum laude with a major in economics from Hofstra University in Long Island, New York, where he studied with Herman A. Berliner. He received a Master of Arts and a Doctor of Philosophy in economics from the University of Pennsylvania in 1979. At the University of Pennsylvania, he was research assistant to Richard Easterlin.

== Career ==
After teaching at Penn for a year, where he received a Distinguished Teaching Award in 1978, Schapiro joined the economics faculty at Williams College in 1980, where he additionally served as assistant provost from 1986 to 1989. He left Williams to become the chair of the economics department at the University of Southern California in 1991, rising to become the dean of the College of Letters, Arts, and Sciences in 1994, and the vice president for planning in 1998. He was appointed as the 16th president of Williams College in 2000, a post he held until becoming president of Northwestern University in 2009. During Schapiro's tenure as Williams president, the college eliminated student loans in favor of grants for low-income students, tripled its number of tutorial courses offered, and increased diversity, with numbers of students of color rising by about eight percentage points, from about 25 to 33 percent of the total student body. Among his students at Williams was Kristin Forbes.

He began his term as the 16th president of Northwestern on September 1, 2009. He is also a professor of economics in Northwestern's Judd A. and Marjorie Weinberg College of Arts and Sciences and holds appointments in the J.L. Kellogg School of Management and the School of Education and Social Policy. Schapiro concluded his tenure as Northwestern president on September 12, 2022, becoming president emeritus. Schapiro has thanked the "illustrious" faculty, students, staff, trustees and alumni and cited his accomplishments, including the university's rise in college rankings. A committed educator of undergraduate students, Schapiro has co-taught courses at Northwestern with Gary Saul Morson, and is known for having frequently hosted students at his home during his presidency. The Illinois General Assembly congratulated Schapiro on his tenure as Northwestern's president on March 9, 2022. Schapiro has served as a trustee of Hillel International, and also as a director of Marsh & McLennan.

Schapiro has been a regular contributor to The Chronicle of Higher Education, and currently writes a column for the Jewish Journal.

=== Research ===
Schapiro is among the nation's leading authorities on the economics of higher education, with particular expertise in the area of college financing and affordability and on trends in educational costs and student aid. He has testified before the U. S. Senate and House committees on economic and educational issues and is widely quoted in national media on those issues.

Schapiro has authored more than 100 articles, and written or edited nine books including Cents and Sensibility: What Economics Can Learn from the Humanities (with Gary Saul Morson, Princeton University Press 2017); The Student Aid Game: Meeting Need and Rewarding Talent in American Higher Education (with Michael McPherson, Princeton University Press 1998); Paying the Piper: Productivity, Incentives and Financing in Higher Education (with Michael McPherson and Gordon Winston, University of Michigan Press 1993); Keeping College Affordable: Government and Educational Opportunity (with Michael McPherson, The Brookings Institution 1991); and an edited volume, "The Fabulous Future? American and the World in 2040" (with Gary Saul Morson, Northwestern University Press 2015).

Schapiro has received research grants and contracts from the National Science Foundation, the U.S. Department of Education, the World Bank, the Andrew W. Mellon Foundation, the Spencer Foundation, the College Board, the Organization for Economic Cooperation and Development, and other groups to study the economics of higher education and related topics. In 2010 he was elected a fellow of the American Academy of Arts and Sciences, and in 2017 he was elected to the National Academy of Education.

== Awards ==
A fellow of the American Academy of Arts and Sciences, Schapiro has received honorary degrees from Amherst College (2001, where he delivered the Class Day address), Hofstra (2006), Wesleyan University (LLD, 2008), University of Notre Dame (2013), and Garrett–Evangelical Theological Seminary (2013, where he delivered the commencement oration). He is additionally an honorary fellow of Exeter College, Oxford.

== Books ==
- Schapiro, Morton (1986). Filling Up America: An Economic-Demographic Model of Population Growth and Distribution in the 19th Century U.S.. JAI Press. ISBN 0-89232-675-1.
- McPherson, Michael; Schapiro, Morton (1990). Selective Admission and the Public Interest. College Board. ISBN 0-87447-399-3.
- McPherson, Michael; Schapiro, Morton (1991). Keeping College Affordable: Government and Educational Opportunity. Brookings Institution Press. ISBN 0-8157-5641-0.
- McPherson, Michael; Schapiro, Morton; Winston, Gordon (1994). Paying the Piper: Productivity, Incentives, and Financing in U.S. Higher Education. University of Michigan Press. ISBN 0-472-10404-7.
- McPherson, Michael; Schapiro, Morton (1998). The Student Aid Game. Princeton University Press. ISBN 0-691-00536-2.
- McPherson, Michael; Schapiro, Morton (2006). College Access: Opportunity or Privilege?. College Board. ISBN 0-87447-774-3.
- McPherson, Michael; Schapiro, Morton (2008). College Success: What It Means and How to Make It Happen. College Board. ISBN 978-0-87447-830-3.
- Morson, Gary Saul; Schapiro, Morton (2015). The Fabulous Future? America and the World in 2040, Editors. Northwestern University Press. ISBN 978-0-81013-198-9.
- Morson, Gary Saul; Schapiro, Morton (2017). Cents and Sensibility: What Economics Can Learn from the Humanities. Princeton University Press. ISBN 9780691176680.
- Morson, Gary Saul; Schapiro, Morton (2021). Minds Wide Shut: How the New Fundamentalisms Divide Us. Princeton University Press. ISBN 978-0-691-21491-7
