= Henry Sanborn Noyes =

American mathematician

Interim President of Northwestern University
- In office 1860–1867
- Preceded by: Randolph Sinks Foster
- Succeeded by: David H. Wheeler
- In office 1854–1856
- Preceded by: Clark T. Hinman
- Succeeded by: Randolph Sinks Foster

Personal details
- Born: December 24, 1822 Landaff, New Hampshire
- Died: May 24, 1872 (aged 49) Evanston, Illinois
- Spouse: Harriet Newell Verbeck Noyes
- Education: Wesleyan University
- Profession: Educator

Henry Sanborn Noyes (December 24, 1822 – May 24, 1872) was an American academic who served as interim president of Northwestern University from 1854 to 1856, and again from 1860 to 1867.

== Biography ==
Noyes was born to devout Methodist parents in Landaff, New Hampshire, on December 24, 1822.

Noyes studied under Clark Hinman at the Newbury Seminary (today the Vermont College of Fine Arts) in Newbury, Vermont, where Hinman was president at the time.

Like Hinman, Noyes transferred to Wesleyan University in spring 1847, and graduated the following year, in 1848. Noyes returned to Newbury as a professor in 1850, and after Hinman departed from Newbury Seminary in 1853, Noyes himself became its president.

When Clark Hinman and a group of other Chicago-area Methodists decided to establish a new university near Chicago, Illinois, to serve the old Northwest Territory, Hinman remembered working with Noyes and asked Noyes to join the new faculty. Noyes was one of the two original faculty members of the university when it opened in 1855 and served primarily as professor of mathematics. When Clark Hinman, the first president of the university, died in 1854, Noyes served as interim president until the election of Randolph S. Foster in 1856. Then, when Foster abdicated his position as president in 1860, Noyes once again served as interim president (1860 to 1867). Noyes also intermittently served a variety of positions alongside his teaching duties, including as Secretary of the Board of Trustees and as the university's financial agent.
