= Robert H. Strotz =

American economist (1922–1994)

Robert Henry Strotz

13th President of Northwestern University
- In office 1970–1984
- Preceded by: J. Roscoe Miller
- Succeeded by: Arnold R. Weber

Personal details
- Born: September 26, 1922 Aurora, Illinois
- Died: November 4, 1994 (aged 72) Deerfield, Illinois
- Education: University of Chicago

Robert H. Strotz
- Spouse: Margaret Hanley Strotz
- Children: 5

Academic background
- Thesis: "Some Problems in the Pure Theory of Income Redistribution : A Study in Welfare Economics" (1951)
- Doctoral advisor: Tjalling Koopmans

Academic work
- Discipline: Economist
- Institutions: Northwestern University
- Main interests: Econometrics

Robert Henry Strotz (September 26, 1922 – November 9, 1994) was an American economist who served as the 13th President of Northwestern University from 1970 to 1984. During his tenure, Northwestern grew in terms of faculty and student, "made capital improvements of more than $142 million", and doubled the value of the school's endowment.

== Early life and education ==
Strotz was born in Aurora, Illinois. Strotz entered Duke University when he was 16. His father died when Strotz was a sophomore at Duke and he transferred to the University of Chicago to be closer to his family. Strotz earned his B.A. in economics at University of Chicago in 1942. During World War II Strotz served for three years in a U.S. Army Air Force Signal Corps intelligence unit of radio-equipped vans listening to and triangulating on German pilots. Upon Germany's defeat, Strotz served a brief stint as an economist-statistician in Berlin where he "estimated necessary food imports to feed the German population".

== Career ==
In 1945 Strotz returned to the University of Chicago as a graduate student in economics. He supported himself by teaching economics courses to returning G.I.'s for the University of Illinois at Navy Pier. In 1947 Strotz joined Northwestern University's economics department as an instructor while pursuing his Ph.D. at University of Chicago. He earned his Ph.D. at University of Chicago in 1951 for his dissertation on welfare economics under future Nobel Prize–winning economist Tjalling Koopmans.

In 1955 - 1956 Strotz, whose specialty was econometrics, studied at major centers of econometric research in the Netherlands, England, and Sweden on a grant from the Rockefeller Foundation. He was a visiting professor at the Massachusetts Institute of Technology in 1958 and 1959.

Outside of his university career, Strotz was an editor of Econometrica, International Economic Review, and Economic Analysis. He also served as chairman of the board of directors of the Federal Reserve Bank of Chicago as well as director of six publicly traded companies including USG Corporation and the National Merit Scholarship Program.

=== Northwestern University ===
Strotz was promoted to full professor by 1958, and served as Dean of the School of Arts and Sciences from 1966 to 1970.

In 1970, Strotz was named President of Northwestern. He assumed the office after it was vacated 15 months earlier by his predecessor, J. Roscoe Miller, in the midst of intense campus protests. While Strotz's appointment was opposed by the Daily Northwestern and Associated Student Government president owing to his positions opposing the closure of campus during a strike and politicization of university classes, he was supported by the faculty.

Strotz served in the position until 1984 and was succeeded by Arnold R. Weber. Following his presidency, Strotz was appointed university chancellor and led fundraising and alumni relations efforts until 1990.

== Personal life ==
Strotz died in a nursing home in Deerfield, Illinois, on November 9, 1994. He had four daughters, one son, and thirteen grandchildren.
