= Michael Schill =

American academic administrator (born 1958)

17th President of Northwestern University
- In office September 12, 2022 – September 15, 2025
- Preceded by: Morton O. Schapiro
- Succeeded by: Henry Bienen (acting)

18th President of the University of Oregon
- In office July 1, 2015 – August 20, 2022
- Preceded by: Michael R. Gottfredson
- Succeeded by: Karl Scholz

Personal details
- Born: Michael Harry Schill; September 30, 1958 (age 68) Schenectady, New York, U.S.
- Education: Princeton University (BA); Yale University (JD)

Michael Harry Schill (born September 30, 1958) is an American legal scholar and university administrator who was the 17th president of Northwestern University from 2022 until his resignation in 2025.

Schill was the 18th president of the University of Oregon from 2015 to 2022, the 13th dean of the University of Chicago Law School from 2009 to 2015, and dean of the University of California, Los Angeles School of Law from 2004 to 2009.

Schill is the author of three books and numerous articles, with foci of scholarship in real estate, housing policy, and housing market discrimination. Property, which he co-authored with Jesse Dukeminier, James Krier, Greg Alexander, and Lior Strahilevitz, is a best-selling casebook used in U.S. law schools.

== Early life and education ==
Schill was born in Schenectady, New York, to Simon Schill and the former Ruth Coplon. He attended Linton High School and was a first-generation college student at Princeton University, where he graduated with an A.B. from the Woodrow Wilson School of Public and International Affairs in 1980 after completing his senior thesis, "Reinvestment and Displacement: A Research Strategy". In 1984, he received his J.D. from Yale Law School, where he was an editor of the Yale Law Journal.

== Career ==
=== Early career ===
Immediately after graduating from law school, Schill clerked for Judge Marvin Katz of the United States District Court for the Eastern District of Pennsylvania for the 1984 term. He practiced law at the law firm of Fried, Frank, Harris, Shriver & Jacobson from 1985 to 1987. In 1987, Schill joined the faculty at the University of Pennsylvania Law School and its Wharton School. He served as assistant professor of law from 1987 to 1992, when he became professor of law. From 1993 to 1995 he was professor of law and real estate. In 1995 he moved to the New York University School of Law and Wagner School of Public Service, becoming professor of law and urban planning. Simultaneously, he became the founding director of the Furman Center for Real Estate and Urban Policy. He held both positions until 2004, and in 2003 he became the Wilf Family Professor in Property Law.

In 2004, Schill became dean and professor of law at the University of California, Los Angeles School of Law. During his five and a half years at UCLA, he recruited legal scholars from top schools across the nation and established 13 endowed chairs. He launched three new legal research centers and two academic specialization programs. Alumni participation in fundraising doubled during his tenure as dean, and private philanthropy tripled. Schill chaired the Council of Professional School Deans and sat on the UCLA Chancellor's Executive Committee.

During Schill's tenure as dean of the University of Chicago Law School, from 2009 to 2015, the school expanded its faculty, increased incoming student credentials to record levels, doubled its fundraising, and established new centers and curricula in law and economics, business leadership, and public interest law. In addition to serving as dean of the law school, Schill was appointed professor in the college, where he taught a course in law and urban problems.

=== Academic administration ===
==== University of Oregon ====
On April 14, 2015, the University of Oregon Board of Trustees named Schill as the 18th president of the University of Oregon. He focused on three priorities: enhancing academic and research excellence, supporting student access and success, and improving campus experience and diversity.

In 2016, Schill announced the launch of the Phil and Penny Knight Campus for Accelerating Scientific Impact, a billion-dollar initiative to transform innovation at the University of Oregon. The first phase, anchored by a $500 million gift from the Knights, was completed in December 2020 with the grand opening of the campus’s first building. In July 2021, the University of Oregon received a second $500 million gift from the Knights to fund the next phase of the campus. Under Schill's leadership, the University of Oregon partnered with Oregon Health and Science University to seed new academic opportunities to benefit society and create a biomedical data science center focused on finding treatments and cures for cancer.

In 2021, Schill announced that the university had surpassed its $3 billion fundraising goal, a university and state record. During his time as president, from 2015 to the end of the campaign, the University of Oregon raised $2.5 billion and extended its comprehensive campaign goal from $2 to $3 billion. The campaign was the largest in the university's history.

In 2015, Schill announced the Oregon Commitment, an effort focused on supporting student success by improving four-year graduation rates and increasing access to higher education through programs such as PathwayOregon, which provides free tuition, fees, and specialized advising to eligible Oregonians. As part of this effort, Tykeson Hall opened in 2019. It is home to two dozen academic advisors trained in an integrated approach to giving students academic and career-readiness support. The university reached the goal of improving four-year graduation rates by 10 percentage points a year early, in 2019.

In an effort to encourage the exchange of ideas and make campus more inclusive and equitable, Schill held a series of events focused on freedom of expression, launched an African American speaker series, oversaw the development of thirty-four diversity action plans for each major administrative and academic unit on campus, and championed the creation of a new Black Cultural Center, which opened in 2019. Schill also recommended changing the names of two campus buildings to send a clear message that racism had no place at the University of Oregon and that the welfare, inclusion, and success of Black, indigenous, and other students, faculty, and staff of color was central to the university’s mission. In 2020, Schill and Provost Patrick Phillips announced a major initiative to hire more faculty of color and retain those already at the university, to establish a center on racial disparities, and to promote inclusion in the University of Oregon’s classrooms.

During Schill's tenure as president, Philip Knight's influence increased, as did the influence other mega-donors and private foundations, and the University of Oregon received some of the largest gifts in higher-ed history. Knight continued to build controversial athletic facilities, this time on the University of Oregon's main campus.

==== Northwestern University ====
On August 11, 2022, Schill was announced as the 17th president of Northwestern University, succeeding Morton O. Schapiro. The previous president-designate, Rebecca M. Blank, had been diagnosed with an aggressive form of cancer that prevented her from taking the position; she died in February 2023. Schapiro temporarily returned to the office until fall 2022, when Schill took office. Schill was formally inaugurated as president in June 2023.

=== 2024 Deering Meadow encampment controversy and resignation ===
In April 2024, amid nationwide pro-Palestinian campus protests following the 2023 Hamas–Israel war, students established a "Gaza solidarity" encampment on Northwestern's Deering Meadow. After five days of demonstrations, the university—in a statement signed by Schill—reached an agreement with organizers that allowed the encampment to end peacefully in exchange for, among other terms, permitting protests through June 1 and expanding institutional support for Palestinian and MENA/Muslim students. Jewish communal groups including ADL Midwest, StandWithUs, and the Louis D. Brandeis Center denounced the agreement, arguing that Jewish students were harassed during the encampment and that the university’s concessions rewarded conduct they saw as antisemitic. Their joint statement called the administration’s response "reprehensible and dangerous" and urged the Board of Trustees to remove Schill.

Schill's handling of the encampment became a focus of federal scrutiny. At a May 2024 U.S. House Committee on Education and the Workforce hearing, Republican members accused him of failing to enforce university rules and protect Jewish students, criticizing what they called a "disgraceful deal" with demonstrators. A subsequent House staff report concluded that "no NU student faced disciplinary sanctions" in connection with the encampment, a finding critics cited as further evidence of insufficient administrative action. In February 2025, Schill announced his resignation as president of Northwestern University. The university's official statement cited "leadership transition priorities", but multiple outlets reported that critics—including some trustee and donor factions—saw his departure as linked in part to dissatisfaction with his handling of the 2024 encampment and broader concerns about campus antisemitism under his leadership. Schill has rejected claims that he failed to protect Jewish students, asserting in congressional testimony and campus messages that the agreement ended a "major antisemitic event" without violence and that due-process requirements limited the speed of disciplinary action.

=== Advisory roles ===
Schill chaired the PAC-12 CEO Group and was a member of the Board of Governors for the NCAA. He is a member of the Board of Trustees of Ithaka Harbors, the nonprofit parent of JSTOR. He has served as a member of the New York City Loft Board, the New York City Neighborhood Investment Advisory Panel, the Fannie Mae New York Partnership Office, Housing Policy Debate and the Board of Governors of Argonne National Laboratory. He has also received research grants from the MacArthur Foundation, the Ford Foundation, and the United States Department of Commerce, among others.

=== Publication ===
Schill is a co-author (with Jesse Dukeminier, James Krier, Greg Alexander, and Lior Strahilevitz) of Property, a major casebook now in its ninth edition. He also co-authored Reducing the Cost of New Housing Construction in New York City: 2005 Update (Center For Real Estate and Urban Policy, 2005) (with Jerry Salama and Jonathan Springer), Revitalizing America’s Cities: Neighborhood Reinvestment and Displacement (State University of New York Press, 1983) (with Richard P. Nathan), and The State of New York City’s Housing and Neighborhoods, 2003, 2004, 2005 (Furman Center for Real Estate and Urban Policy) (with Denise Previti). He is also the editor of Housing and Community Development in New York City: Facing The Future (State University of New York Press, 1999).

== Honors ==
In April 2010, Schill received the Impact Award for Excellence in Housing from New York City's Citizens Housing and Planning Council (CHPC). He was recognized for his work as the founding director of the Furman Center for Real Estate and Urban Policy.

In 2011, Schill was elected as a Fellow of the American Academy of Arts and Sciences.
