= J. Roscoe Miller =

12th President of Northwestern University
- In office 1949–1970
- Preceded by: Franklyn Bliss Snyder
- Succeeded by: Robert Strotz

Personal details
- Born: October 26, 1905
- Died: October 16, 1977

James Roscoe Miller (October 26, 1905 – October 16, 1977) was the twelfth president of Northwestern University, serving between 1949 and 1970.

During his tenure, Northwestern substantially increased the size of its Evanston campus, constructing many new buildings on adjacent land reclaimed by filling in Lake Michigan. Furthermore, the university's academic programs were strengthened, the faculty was expanded, and enrollment was increased.

Between 1962 and 1964, the James Roscoe Miller Campus (more commonly known as the Lakefill) was constructed to provide land for expansion of the university by extending the eastern edge of the campus 1,000 feet (300 m) into Lake Michigan. The project would increase the university's educational land holdings from 85 to 159 acres (0.64 km^{2}) and would reorient the entire campus towards the lake.

Miller attended the University of Utah, where he was a member of the Sigma Chi fraternity.
