= Bienen School of Music =

Music school at Northwestern University

Northwestern University Bienen School of Music
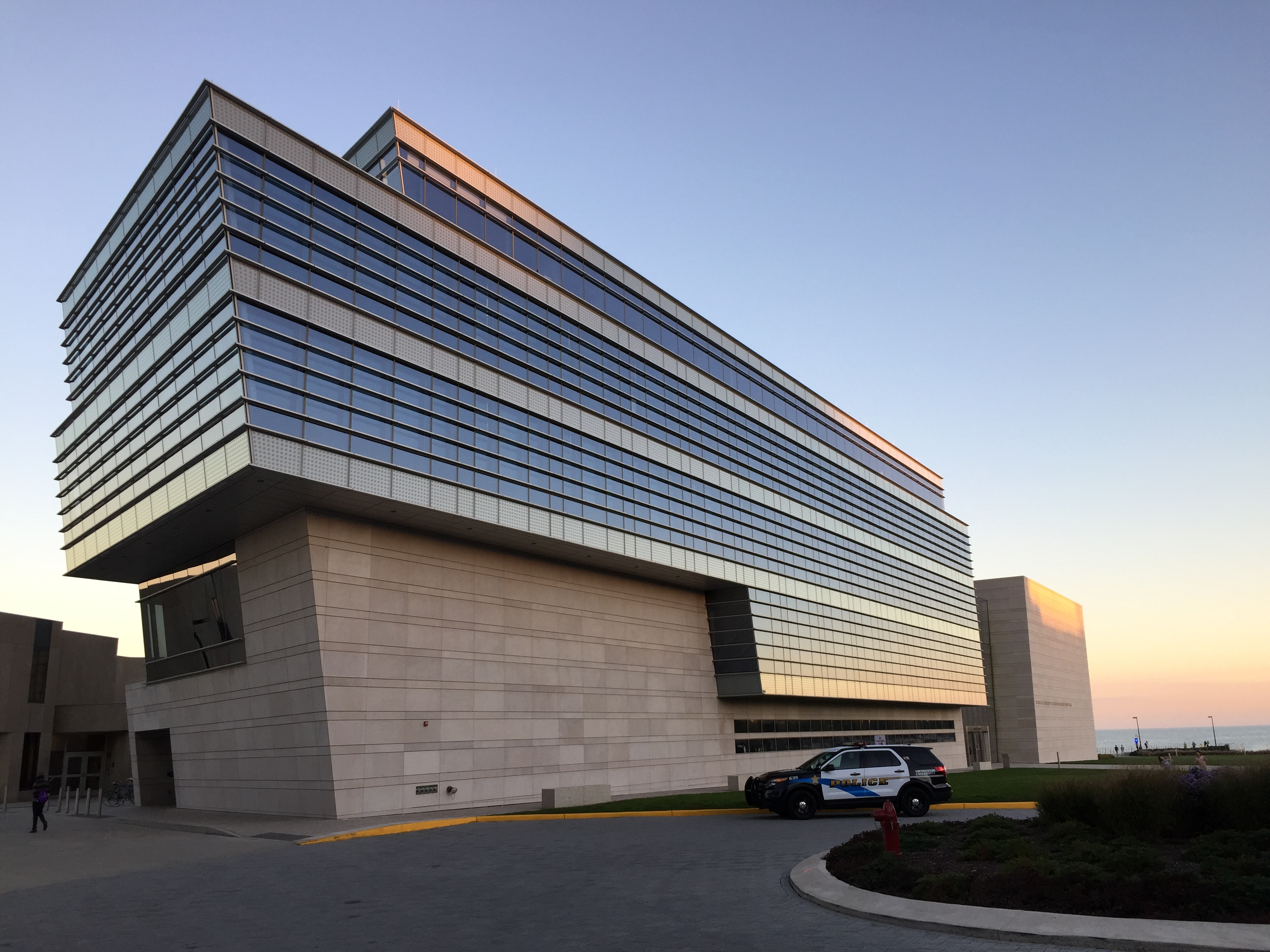
- Other names: Henry and Leigh Bienen School of Music
- Established: 1895
- Parent institution: Northwestern University
- Dean: Jonathan Bailey Holland
- Faculty: 125
- Undergraduates: 425
- Location: Evanston, Illinois, U.S. 42°03′07″N 87°40′17″W
- Campus: Suburban
- Website: music.northwestern.edu

The Northwestern University Bienen School of Music is the music and performing arts school of Northwestern University. It is located on Northwestern University's campus in Evanston, Illinois, United States.

The school was previously known as the Northwestern University School of Music from 1895 until September 2008, when it was renamed to honor retiring University president Henry Bienen and his wife, Leigh Buchanan Bienen.

== Description ==
The Bienen School offers performance degrees in all orchestral instruments, piano, guitar, voice, jazz studies, and conducting, as well as academic degrees in composition, musicology, music history, music education, and music theory and cognition. It offers a dual-degree undergraduate program in liberal arts, journalism, engineering, communication, or education and social policy in conjunction with those respective university schools. The Bienen School has approximately 125 faculty members, 400 undergraduate students, and 200 graduate students.

== History ==
The Bienen School of Music is one of the oldest degree-granting music schools in the United States. Its beginnings date to 1873, when the Northwestern Female College and the Evanston College for Ladies were incorporated into the Northwestern University Woman's College. This new institution established the Conservatory of Music, and in 1891, Peter Christian Lutkin was named its director. In 1895, it became the School of Music, with Lutkin serving as its first dean.

During Lutkin's 33-year tenure, a new music building opened, the "Beehive" practice facility was constructed, and the first honorary doctor of music degree was awarded in 1915 to Frederick Stock, conductor of the Chicago Symphony Orchestra. Lutkin was succeeded in 1928 by Carl Beecher, who had earned the school's first bachelor's degree. Music education professor John W. Beattie was appointed the school's third dean in 1936. During his administration, the graduate program was expanded and Lutkin Hall constructed in 1941. George Howerton assumed the deanship in 1951. Under his leadership, the school established an opera program, began a series of guest artist master classes, and increased the music library's holdings. He was succeeded in 1971 by Thomas Miller, whose tenure brought revisions to the undergraduate curriculum as well as the opening of Pick-Staiger Concert Hall in 1975 and Regenstein Hall of Music in 1977. Bernard J. Dobroski became the school's sixth dean in 1990. His term expanded the course offerings for non-majors and community engagement programs.

Toni-Marie Montgomery served as dean from 2003 to 2023. Under her leadership the school has established two international awards, the Jean Gimbel Lane Prize in Piano Performance and the Michael Ludwig Nemmers Prize in Music Composition; established the Institute for New Music; provided all doctor of musical arts candidates with full-tuition scholarships; opened the Patrick G. and Shirley W. Ryan Center for the Musical Arts; appointed the Dover Quartet as the school's quartet-in-residence; and secured funding for a tour to Asia in 2018 by the Northwestern University Symphony Orchestra.

Since September 1, 2023, Jonathan Bailey Holland, alumnus of the Curtis Institute of Music and Harvard University and previous chair of the music department at Carnegie Mellon University, has been the dean of the Bienen School of Music.

== Areas of study ==
The Bienen School of Music offers 15 academic majors in six degree programs. The Bienen School offers programs in the following areas of study:

=== Music Performance ===
- Brass
- Percussion
- Strings
- Harp
- Piano and Piano Pedagogy
- Woodwinds
- Voice and Opera
- Jazz Studies
- Conducting

=== Music Studies ===
- Composition and Music Technology
- Music Education
- Music Theory and Cognition
- Musicology

== Performing Ensembles ==
The Bienen School of Music currently sponsors 20 ensembles: the Symphony Orchestra, Chamber Orchestra, Baroque Music Ensemble, Symphonic Wind Ensemble, Symphonic Band, Contemporary Music Ensemble, Philharmonia, Concert Band, Jazz Orchestra, Jazz Small Ensembles, University Chorale, University Singers, Bienen Contemporary/Early Vocal Ensemble, Alice Millar Chapel Choir, Northwestern Camerata, Brass Choir, Cello Ensemble, Saxophone Ensemble, Percussion Ensemble, and Guitar Ensemble. Some ensembles are open to music majors only. In addition, students can form chamber music groups of their own. Victor Yampolsky is the director of orchestras, Donald Nally is the director of choral organizations, and Dr. Rob Taylor is the newly appointed director of bands, taking the place of legendary wind conductor Dr. Mallory Thompson.

== Guest Artist Series ==
The Bienen School of Music currently hosts four professional guest artist subscription series.

Established in 1993, the Segovia Classical Guitar Series brings artists and young rising stars, including winners of the Guitar Foundation of America International Competition, to Chicago's North Shore. Recently, the series has welcomed classical guitarists Eduardo Fernandez, Ekachai Jearakul, lutenist Paul O'Dette, the Assad Brothers, and Raphaella Smits, among others.

The Skyline Piano Artist Series was established in 2015 to bring pianists from around the world to perform in the Mary B. Galvin Recital Hall. Recently, the series has hosted Jonathan Biss, Emanuel Ax, Sergei Babayan, Jorge Federico Osorio, Maria João Pires, and 2017 and 2022 Van Cliburn International Piano Competition winners Yekwon Sunwoo and Yunchan Lim.

The Tichio-Finnie Vocal Master Class Series debuted in 2014 and has featured such vocalists as Renée Fleming, Isabel Leonard, Marilyn Horne, Matthew Polenzani, and composer Jake Heggie. The series allows Bienen School voice and opera program students to perform for and be coached by opera professionals.

The Winter Chamber Music Festival hosts guest artists and Bienen School faculty for three weekends each January. This series is focused heavily on string quartets and other chamber ensembles and has featured artists including the Dover Quartet, Pinchas Zukerman, Simone Lamsma, and the Kalichstein-Laredo-Robinson Trio.

== Bienen School Prizes ==
=== Michael Ludwig Nemmers Prize in Music Composition ===
In fall 2003, the Bienen School of Music established the Michael Ludwig Nemmers Prize in Music Composition, a biennial award honoring classical music composers of outstanding achievement. Nominations are solicited worldwide and the winner is determined by a three-member selection committee, comprising individuals of widely recognized stature in the music community. The prize includes a cash award of $100,000 and a performance by the Chicago Symphony Orchestra. The recipient is expected to participate in two to three nonconsecutive weeks of residency at the Bienen School of Music interacting with students and faculty. In addition to the Michael Ludwig Nemmers Prize in Music Composition, Northwestern University administers four other Nemmers prizes: the Frederic Esser Nemmers Prize in Mathematics, the Erwin Plein Nemmers Prize in Economics, the Mechthild Esser Nemmers Prize in Medical Science, and the Nemmers Prize in Earth Sciences.

Past winners include:

- 2004: John Adams
- 2006: Oliver Knussen
- 2008: Kaija Saariaho
- 2010: John Luther Adams
- 2012: Aaron Jay Kernis
- 2014: Esa-Pekka Salonen
- 2016: Steve Reich
- 2018: Jennifer Higdon
- 2021: William Bolcom
- 2023: Tania León

=== The Jean Gimbel Lane Prize in Piano Performance ===
In 2005, the Bienen School of Music established the biennial Jean Gimbel Lane Prize in Piano Performance to honor pianists who have achieved the highest levels of national and international recognition. Winners receive a $50,000 cash award and spend two to three non-consecutive weeks in residence at the Bienen School of Music, interacting with students and faculty. As part of one of the residency weeks, winners offer a public performance.

Past winners include:

- 2006: Richard Goode
- 2008: Stephen Hough
- 2010: Yefim Bronfman
- 2012: Murray Perahia
- 2014: Garrick Ohlsson
- 2016: Emanuel Ax
- 2018: Marc-André Hamelin
- 2021: András Schiff
- 2023: Maria João Pires

== Facilities ==
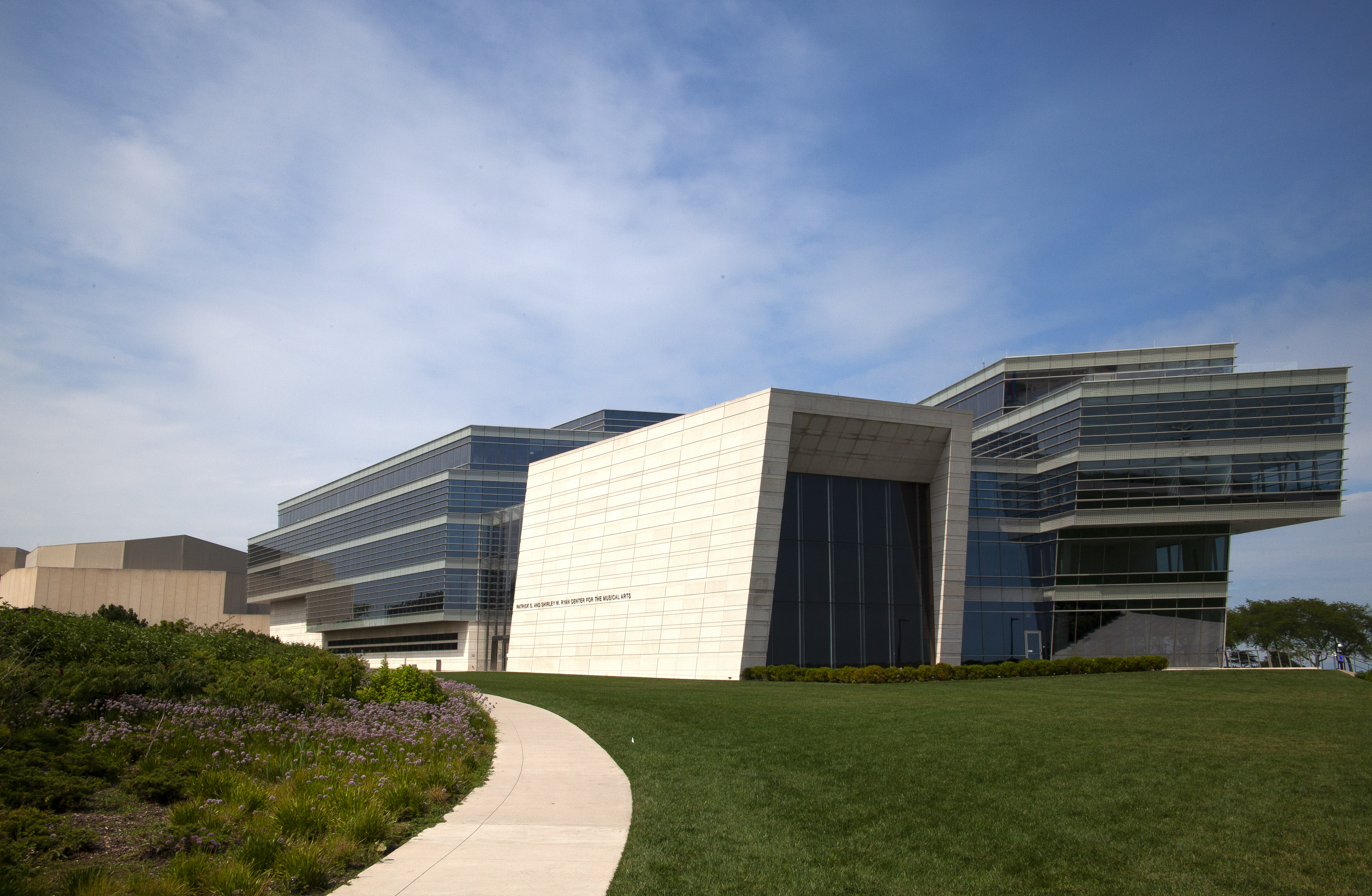
Patrick G. and Shirley W. Ryan Center for the Musical Arts

=== School Buildings ===
In its earlier Days, the Bienen School of Music was housed in two buildings. The Music Administration Building was designed by Gurdon P. Randall and built in 1873 as the Women's College of Northwestern University. In 1901 it was named for Frances E. Willard, and served as a women's dormitory. It became the home of the Northwestern School of Music in 1940, and was renovated in 1988. Vocal studies, piano, and composition departments were housed in this building, in addition to administrative offices and academic classrooms. The organ department, which formerly occupied a wing in this building, was controversially closed in 2003.

Regenstein Hall of Music was built in 1977. This building sits on the "Lakefill" and overlooks Lake Michigan. It houses studios for the instrumental and conducting programs, practice rooms, a rehearsal room, and a recital hall.

In February 2008, the University announced that a new $105 million five-story building was to be erected as part of a renovation plan for the southeast corner of the campus. Construction began in June 2012. The new building, named after donors Patrick G. and Shirley W. Ryan, opened in Fall 2015. The building unites all music faculty and departments in a common location for the first time since the early 1970s and includes classrooms, teaching labs, teaching studios, practice rooms, student lounges, a choral rehearsal room and library, an opera rehearsal room and black box theater, and a 400-seat recital hall.

=== Performance Venues ===
==== Patrick G. and Shirley W. Ryan Center for the Musical Arts ====
Designed by Chicago-based architectural firm Goettsch Partners, the music building is situated on the lakefront, connected to Regenstein Hall of Music. The Ryan Center houses teaching studios, faculty and administrative offices, 10 classrooms, 99 practice rooms, and three performance spaces: the Mary B. Galvin Recital Hall, the David and Carol McClintock Choral and Recital Room, and the Shirley Welsh Ryan Opera Theater. The design features a limestone base supporting a primarily glass exterior.

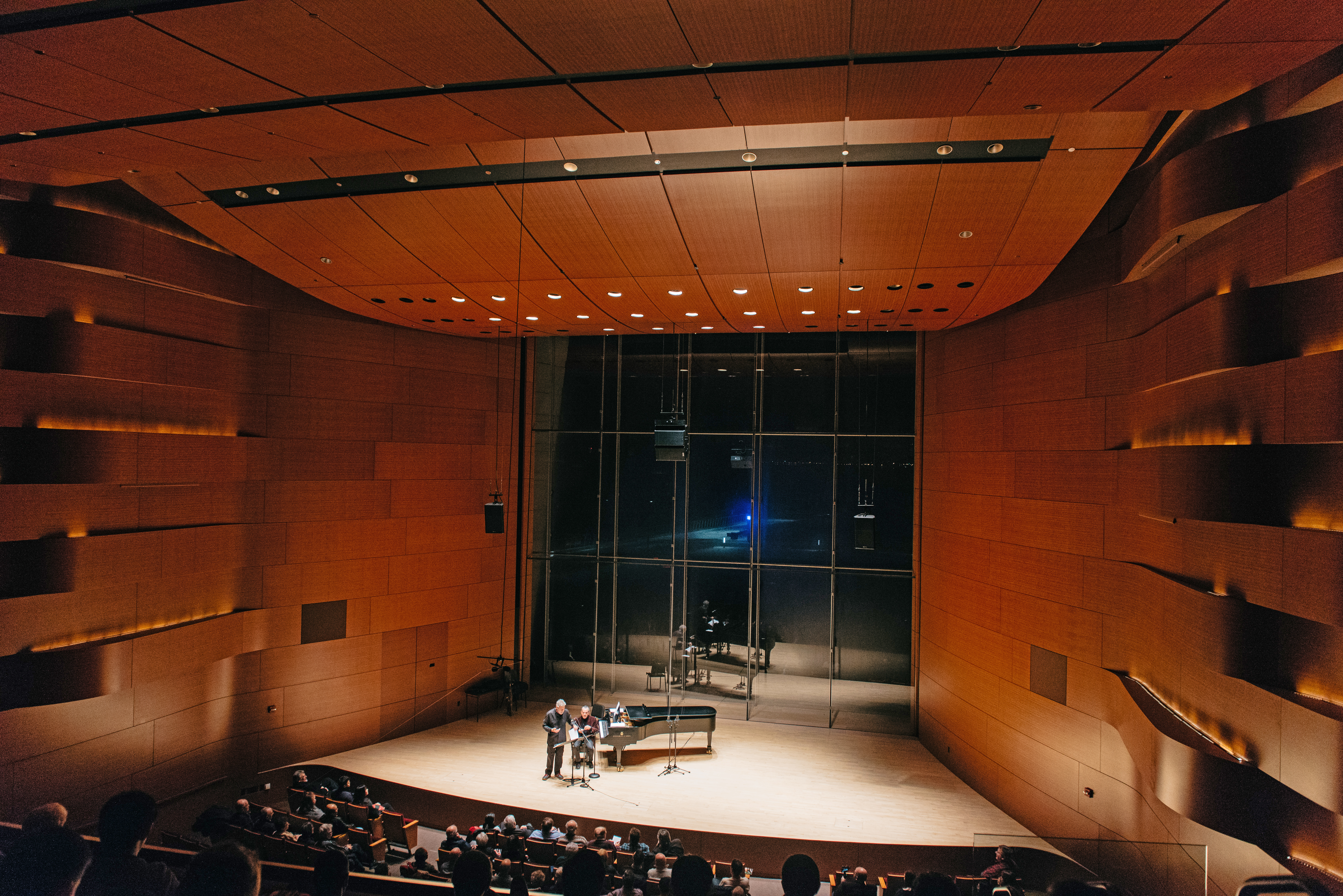
Mary B. Galvin Recital Hall

==== Ryan Center Performance Spaces ====
- Mary B. Galvin Recital Hall. This 400-seat hall, with main floor and balcony seating, features a 40-foot glass wall. Walls on each side of the hall are made from undulating wood, covered by African moabi wood, providing optimal acoustics. John van Rein of the Chicago Tribune named Galvin Hall the "most impressive new Chicago concert facility" in 2015.
- David and Carol McClintock Choral and Recital Room. This is a 120-seat performance space for choral rehearsals, small ensemble performances, and student recitals. The walls are paneled with the same moabi wood as the Mary B. Galvin Recital Hall
- Shirley Welsh Ryan Opera Theater. This 163-seat hall is a theater space for opera performances and recitals, with double-height ceilings. Waukegan Steel Company provided steel beams, catwalks, and stairs for the space. The retractable seating was designed and constructed in the UK.

==== Pick-Staiger Concert Hall ====
Designed by Edward D. Dart and dedicated in 1975, the Pick-Staiger Concert Hall's 1,000-seat venue is the main performance space not only for the Bienen School but for the university as a whole.

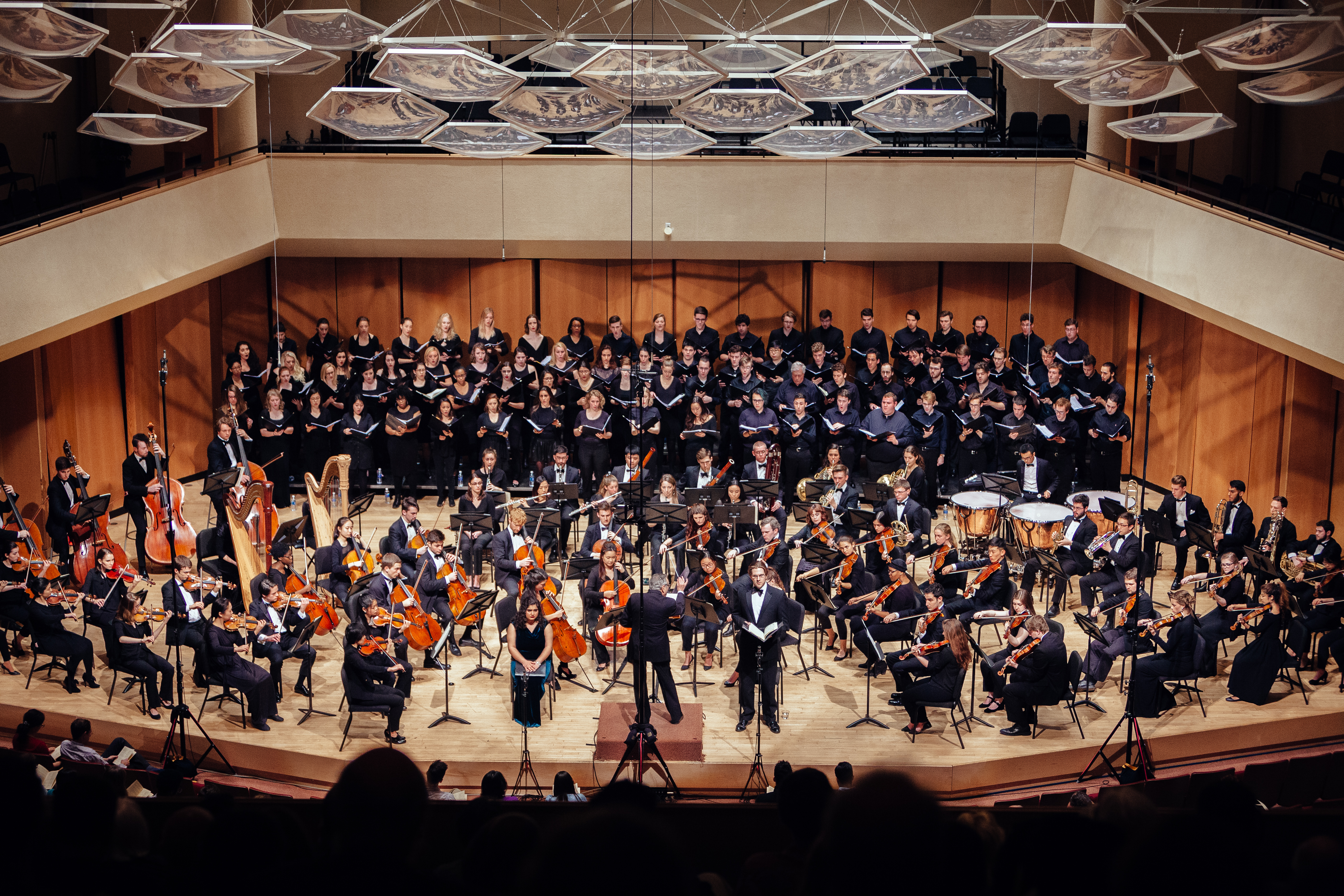
Pick-Staiger Concert Hall

==== Additional Performance Spaces ====
- Regenstein Hall of Music. The building connects directly to the new Ryan Center for the Musical Arts, with two connections between the buildings on each of Regenstein's three levels. It is home to the Department of Music Performance and University Bands faculty and contains 38 practice rooms. The building also includes a 200-seat Master Class Room (also known as "MCR"), which hosts hundreds of performances and events annually.
- Cahn Auditorium. Located in Scott Hall (1940), this 1,000-seat venue is the only space on campus with a full orchestra pit and is used primarily for operatic productions.
- Alice Millar Chapel & Religious Center. Built in 1962, this neo-Gothic church in stone and brick houses a 100-rank Aeolian-Skinner organ and is used for choral, mixed ensemble performances, concerts, lectures, and recitals. The building houses two chapels: the Millar Chapel with 700 seats, and the Vail Chapel with 125 seats. An adjacent building, Parkes Hall, houses classrooms and the chaplain's office, and completes the Alice Millar complex. The building was a gift to Northwestern University from Mr. and Mrs. McGaw. Mrs. McGaw was a graduate of Northwestern, and Mr. McGaw served for many years as a trustee of the university.
- Lutkin Hall. Built in 1941 and named for the first dean of the Music School, Peter Lutkin, this 400-seat hall was used primarily as a recital space. It ceased to be a Bienen School performance space in 2015, with the opening of the Ryan Center for the Musical Arts, and is now operated by the Norris University Center.

=== Music Library ===
Founded in 1945, the Northwestern University Music Library occupies the second floor of the Charles Deering Library and serves the Bienen School of Music.

=== Notable alumni ===
- Christopher M. Anderson ('96) – Director, Goin' Band from Raiderland; associate director of bands; associate professor of music, Texas Tech University School of Music
- Andrew Bird ('95) – Musician, songwriter
- Mark Camphouse ('75) – Professor of music and director of the Wind Symphony, George Mason University
- Kay Davis ('42) – Singer with Duke Ellington band
- Rollo Dilworth ('03) – Chair of Music Education and Music Therapy at Boyer College of Music and Dance at Temple University
- Eric Garcia ('02, '07) – Music director of the Boise Philharmonic
- Giancarlo Guerrero (G '92) music director, Nashville Symphony
- Jeff Cline ('95) – Audio engineer, producer, Music Industry Division Head at the University of Memphis
- Nancy Gustafson (G' 80) soprano
- Howard Hanson ('17) – Composer, president of Eastman School of Music
- Sheldon Harnick ('49) – Lyricist for musicals, including Fiddler on the Roof
- David Hattner ('90) – Musical Director, Portland Youth Philharmonic
- D. Antoinette Handy ('53) – flautist, music scholar
- Brian Hecht – Bass Trombone, Atlanta Symphony
- Timothy Higgins – Principal Trombone, San Francisco Symphony
- Han Kuo-Huang ('74) – Ethno-musicologist, musician
- Dan Novak ('89) – Director of the Patrick G. and Shirley W. Ryan Opera Center at the Lyric Opera of Chicago
- Will James ('04)- Principal percussion, St. Louis Symphony
- Andrew Mason ('03) – Founder and former CEO, Groupon
- Sherrill Milnes ('56) – Opera singer, Northwestern professor emeritus
- Toby Oft – Principal Trombone, Boston Symphony Orchestra
- George N. Parks – Director, University of Massachusetts Minuteman Marching Band
- Mary Beth Peil ('62) – Actress who has starred in The Stepford Wives and Jersey Girl
- Jenny Powers ('03) – Actress
- Howard Reich ('77) Arts writer, Chicago Tribune
- Steve Rodby ('77) – Grammy Award-winning jazz bassist; album producer
- Ned Rorem ('44) – Composer
- Arnie Roth ('75) – Grammy Award-winning music director and principal conductor, Chicagoland Pops Orchestra
- David Sanborn ('67) – Jazz saxophonist
- Greg Suran ('93) – Acoustic and electric guitarist with B-52s
- Frederick Swann – Organist, composer and past President of the American Guild of Organists
- Augusta Read Thomas ('87) – Composer and university professor, University of Chicago
- Mallory Thompson – Director of Bands, Northwestern University; see Northwestern University Wildcat Marching Band
- William VerMeulen- Principal horn, Houston Symphony & professor of horn, Rice University
- Ralph Votapek ('60) Pianist
- William "Ring" Warner (early 1970's)- Principal Double Bass, Phoenix and Dallas Symphonies, and Pacific Northwest Ballet Orchestra
- Donald Reid Womack ('90, '93) – Composer and Professor, University of Hawaii
