= Northwestern University Lakefill =

Area of Northwestern University reclaimed from Lake Michigan

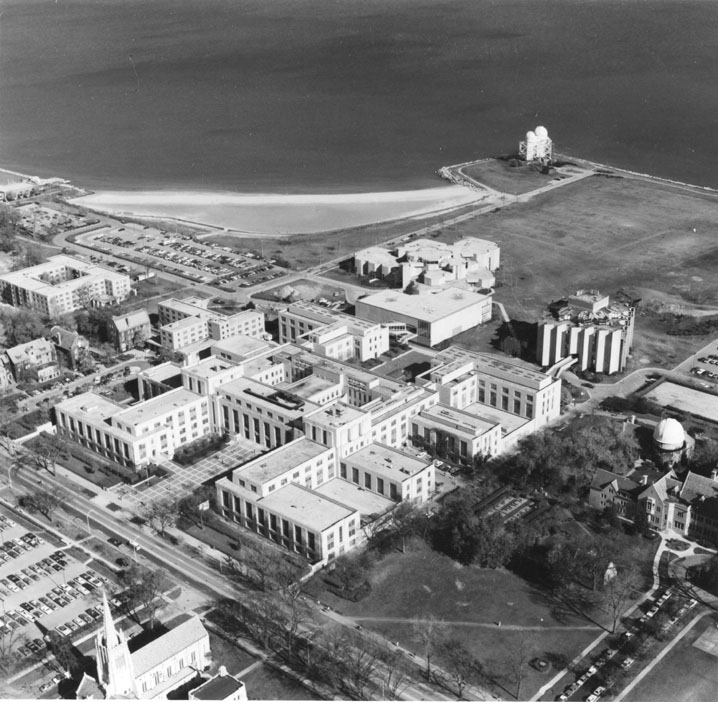
The Technological Institute in 1977, after the construction of the Lakefill. Lindheimer Observatory is at top (since demolished).

The Northwestern University Lakefill (formally known as the James Roscoe Miller Campus) is a large area of Northwestern University land that was reclaimed from Lake Michigan in 1962–1964 by creating a seawall of limestone blocks quarried in Illinois and Indiana and using landfill materials from the construction of the Port of Indiana. The lakefill resulted from the university's need to expand the campus's physical footprint; Northwestern President J. Roscoe Miller received permission from the town of Evanston and the Illinois legislature (as well as many other groups) to reclaim 74 acres (30 hectares) of underwater land. This almost doubled the size of the previously 85-acre (34-hectare) campus. In 1968, the lakefill was expanded by an additional 10 acres (4.0 hectares) on the southern end of the campus.

As solid ground was established, Northwestern began the construction of the Northwestern University Library, the Norris University Center and the Pick-Staiger Concert Hall, all built from 1970–1975.

== History and creation ==
Talks to expand the campus via lakefront had started in 1893, and were again brought up in 1930. It was not until October 1960 that the university formally announced their plans of expansion. Construction then started in July 1962, following the city of Evanston's final approval. Creation of the lakefill was reinforced by the university's need to expand, but in a way that did not crowd the campus with more buildings, or infringe on Evanston land. Expanding out toward the lake also came at a cheaper cost, estimated at around $113,000/acre to build out onto the lake versus around $300,000/acre to expand further into the city of Evanston.

Extensive state and local government cooperation was needed in order to purchase and build upon the lakefront. Following unanimous approval by both the Illinois House and Senate, as well as then current governor Otto J. Kerner, the state of Illinois allowed Northwestern to purchase underwater property for $100 an acre. Following the purchase of the land, the university obtained permission from the U.S. Army Corps of Engineers on September 6, 1961, and finally began construction on the lakefill in July 1962.

The scope of the project evolved into a 20-year plan, including the construction of multiple scholastic, gallery, and performance buildings, alongside space for recreational and athletic activities on the campus. The large pond within the middle of the lakefill was included not only for aesthetic purposes of the campus, but additionally to serve as the cooling reserve for Northwestern's Central Utility Plant. The placement of each aspect on the new lakefill was meant to unify both the north and south ends of campus, and the design of the paths was focused on creating both a relaxing environment and pedestrian-oriented campus.

== Lakefront ==
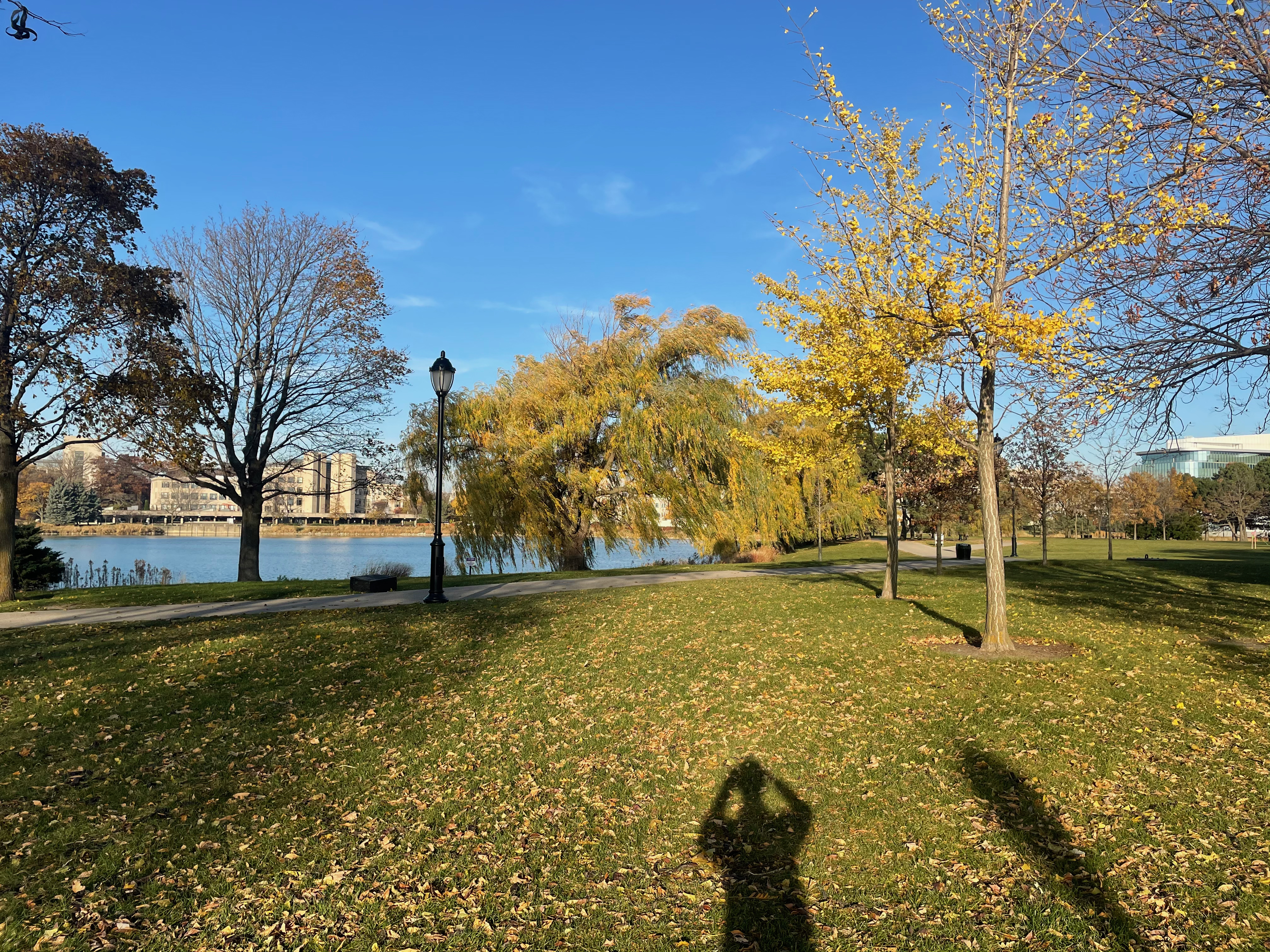
Lakefill in the fall (November), facing west towards campus

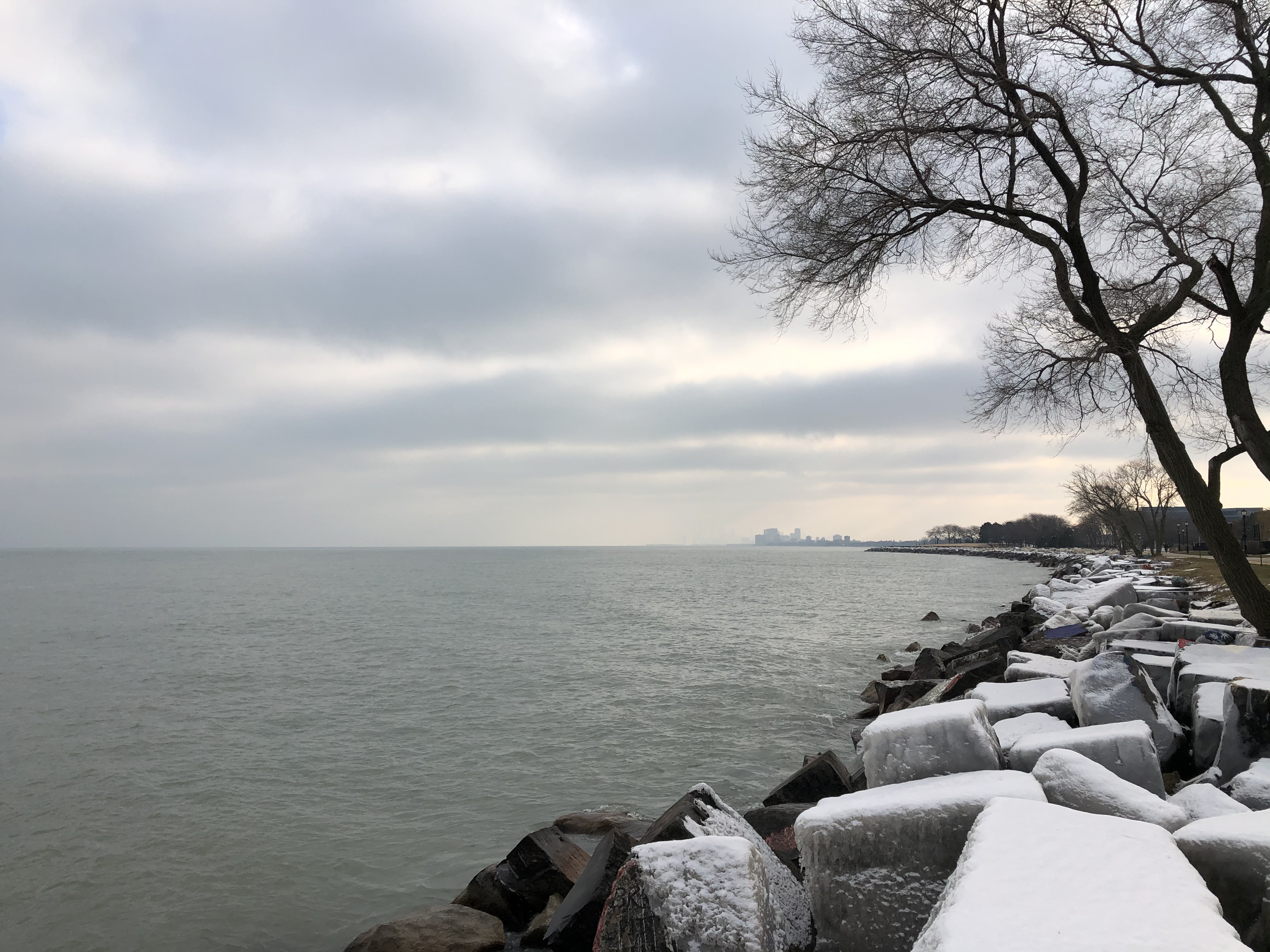
Lakefill in the winter (January 2021) after snow.

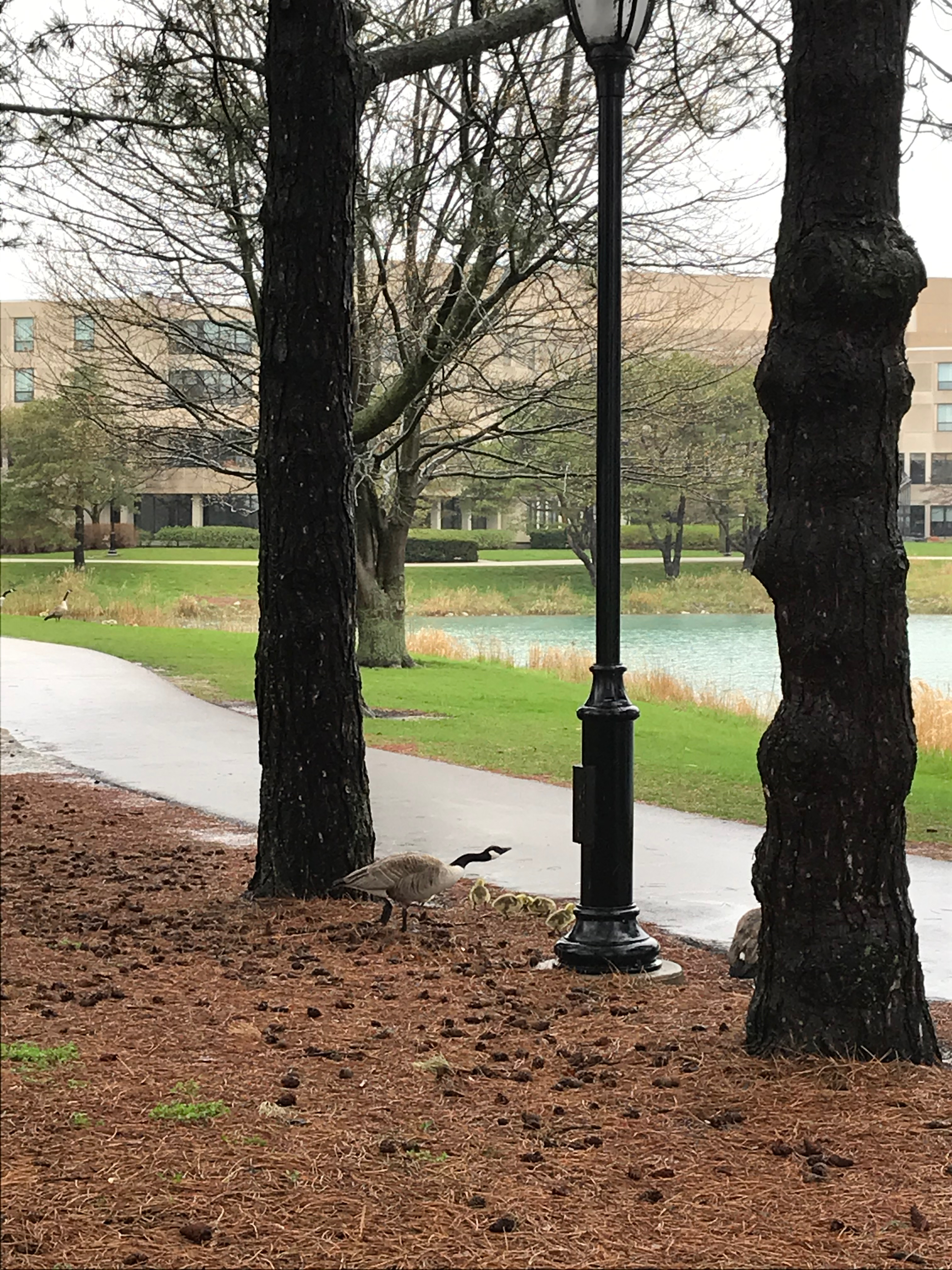
Lakefill geese with goslings. Herons and other birds also frequent the area.

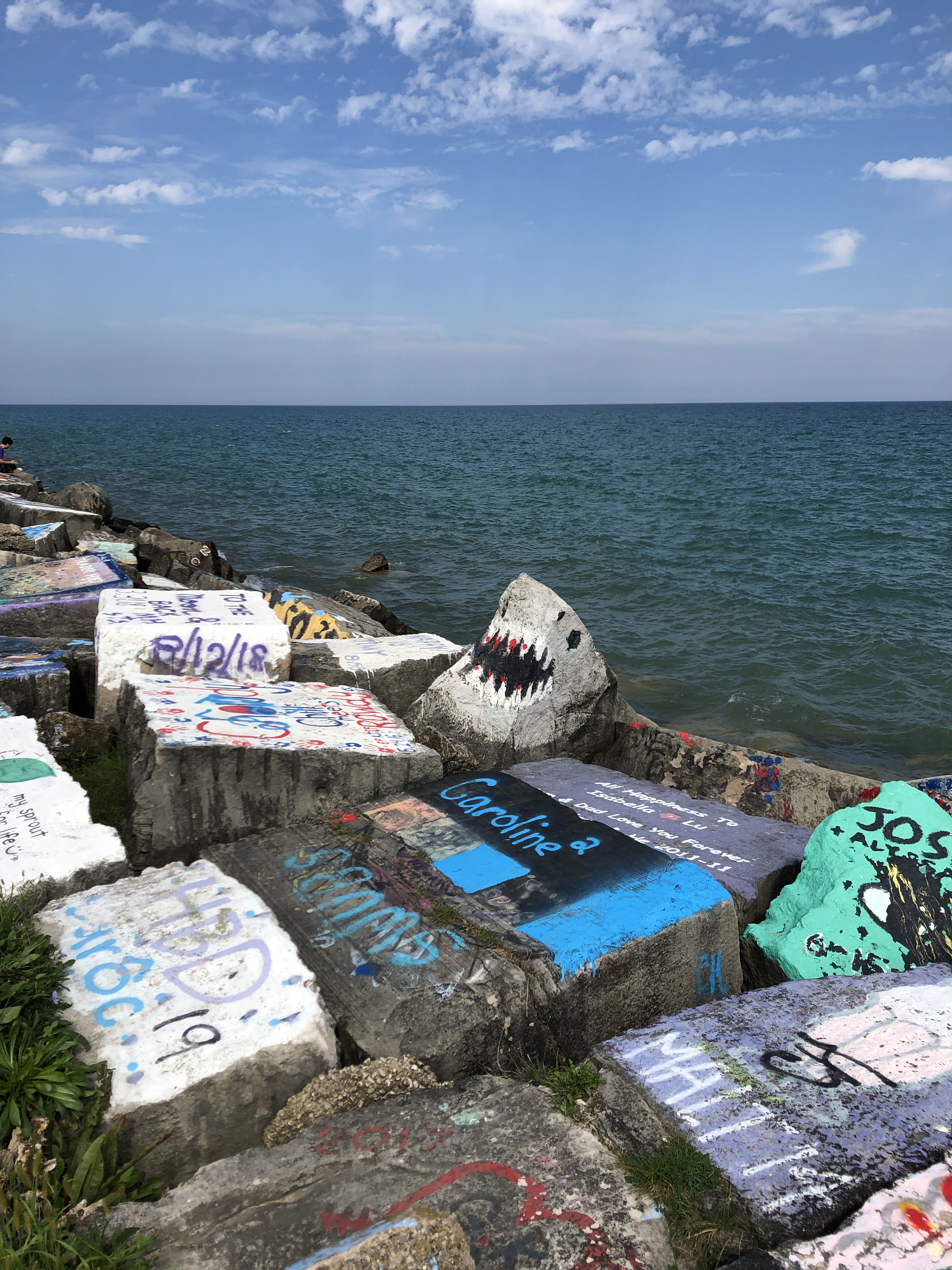
A painted rock at the lakefill.

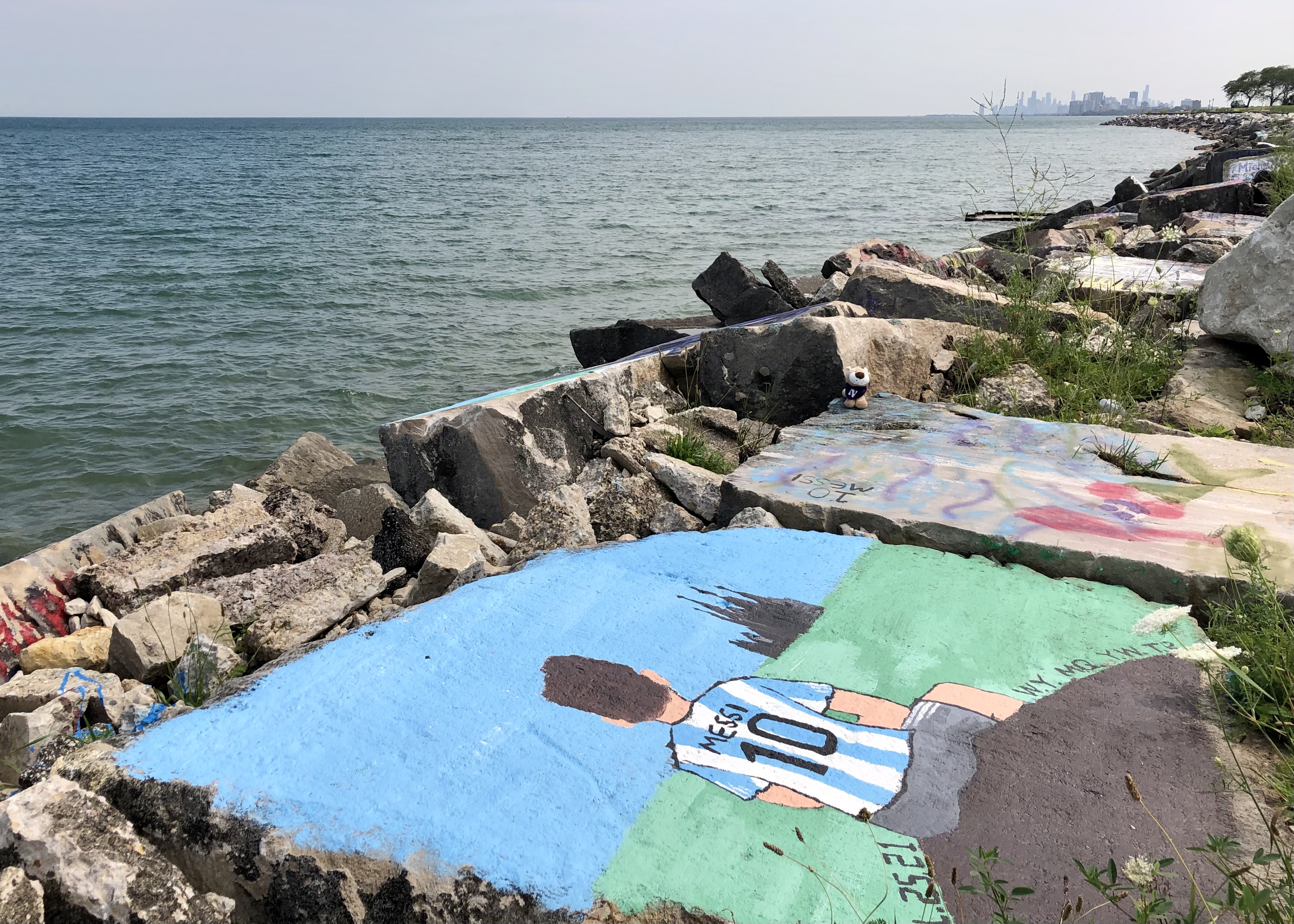
Paintings, doodles, and messages often appear on the lakefill rocks which form the breakwaters (August 2021).

The eastern portion of the lakefill consists of a peninsula, creating a small lagoon in the center of the new campus. The peninsula is designed as a park-like area with paths for jogging and biking.

The eastern shore of the lakefill, facing Lake Michigan, is composed of rocks intended to absorb waves from the lake. Those that remain above the waters are frequently painted, mostly by Northwestern students. Students began painting the rocks in 1970, within a few years of the lakefill's construction. Paintings include doodles, inside jokes, and several marriage proposals, and the messages carry an overall trend of optimism.

Although the lakefill campus refers to the full 74 acres created from 1962–1964, students often use the term "lakefill" to describe this specific lakefront area, which is a frequent gathering place on campus. The space is used to host events such as Dillo Day, the largest student-run music festival in the country, and the local Relay for Life program. In the spring of 2016, a program called ART BOX was started to provide an area on the lakefill to be used by multiple groups across campus for smaller theatrical performances, musical performances, and art exhibits.

The lakefill has become an integral part of campus and student life as a space for unwinding, working out or coming together for these greater events and traditions. This was also shown when the winning idea for Northwestern's Associate Student Government (ASG) 5K Initiative, an initiative introduced to improve student life on campus, in 2012, was the implementation of “WiFi on the Lakefill” after roughly 700 Northwestern students voted in a school-wide poll. The project was completed within the year. Over the summer, hammocks are a frequent sight as groups of students erect their hammocks around the lakefill or bring a book and hammock solo. In 2021, work was performed to add more rocks to the lakefront edge to prevent erosion from occurring, and a small strip of land on the southwest end was allowed to run wild with tall grasses and flowers. It is unclear whether this will be mowed in the future or is a permanent feature of the lakefill.

== Buildings ==
The lakefill is home to many key buildings on the Northwestern campus, many of which enjoy a direct view of Lake Michigan.

=== Northwestern University Library ===
One of the first additions to the lakefill campus was the Northwestern University Library, which began construction in 1966, and opened in 1970. It replaced the Charles Deering Library as the main library on campus, and is connected to the Deering Library. The building consists of three towers and a basement area, each devoted to a certain area of study. Designed by architect Walter Nesch, the building is meant to evoke both a Brutalist architecture style and the Gothic style of the old Deering Library.

=== Patrick G. and Shirley W. Ryan Center for the Musical Arts ===
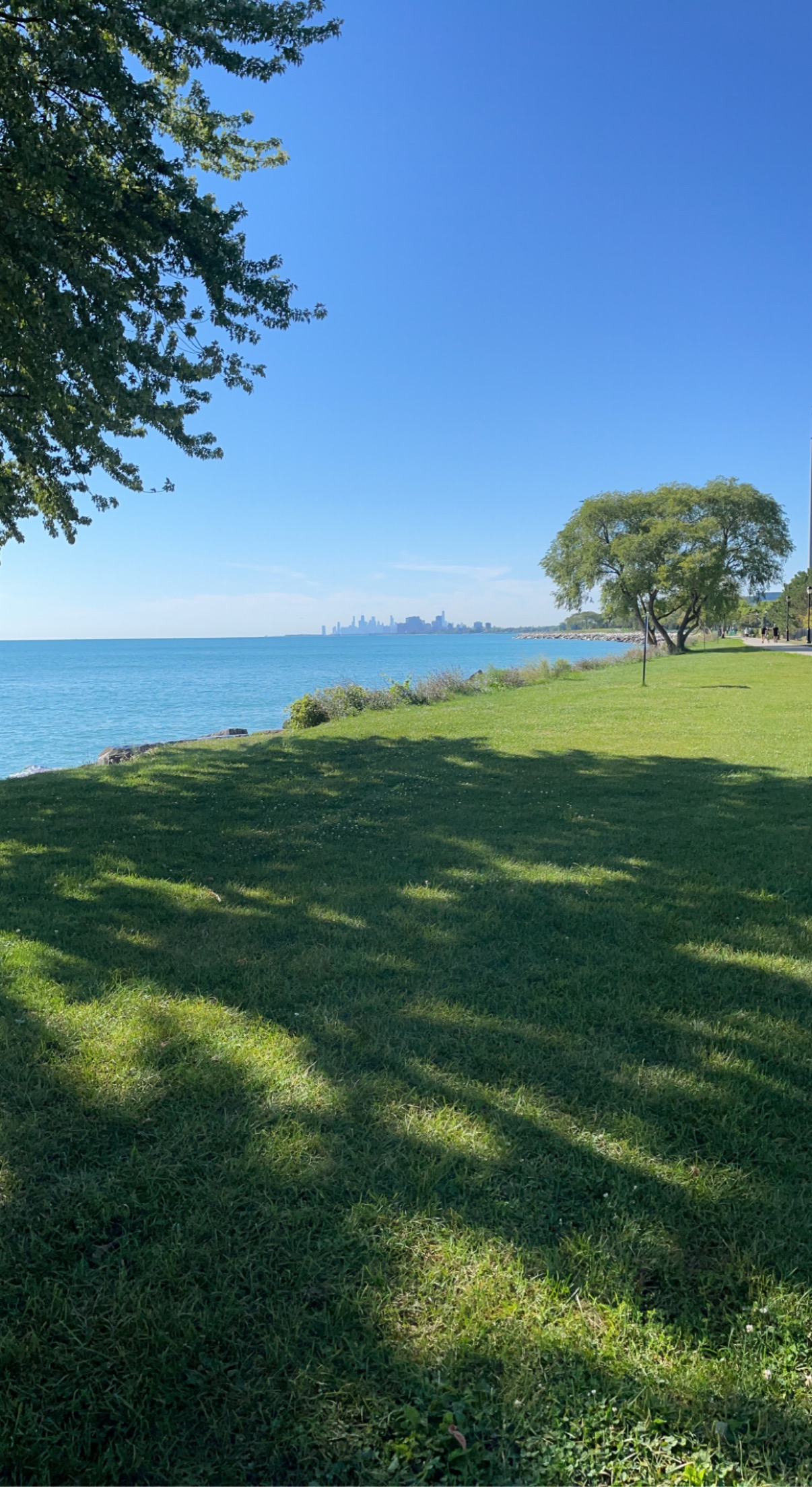
Lakefront as seen from north end of lakefill facing south towards Chicago

Northwestern University first planned the reconstruction of the Bienen School of Music in February 2008. After competing with 25 architect companies, Chicago-based Goettsch Partners won the design of this giant glass building. Construction started on May 18, 2012, and opened for classes in the fall of 2015.

The exterior of the building consists mainly of glass, taking advantage of the shorelines and skyline of neighboring Chicago. The base of the building features a limestone base with additions of concrete in some middle pillar parts of the interior, also serving as the separation wall for Mary B. Galvin Recital Hall, which offers a direct view of the lake and downtown Chicago. Part of the building also rests on the lakefill, as it partly integrates the existing Regenstein Hall of Music on all three levels.

The Ryan Center has three new performance venues, including the 400-seat Mary B. Galvin Recital Hall, 150-seat black box Shirley Welsh Ryan Opera Theater, and a 120-seat David and Carol McClintock Choral and Recital Room. The building also offices Bienen School of Music departments like admission, financial aids, student affairs, career services, as well as the career department of the School of Communication. Instrumental practice rooms occupy the third floor, faculty studios on the fourth. Offices of the deans and administrative staff occupy the second, fourth and fifth floor.

=== Regenstein Hall of Music ===
In 1977, the Regenstein Hall of Music was constructed on the lakefill campus. It was also designed by Walter Nesch, and connects directly to the new Ryan Center for the Musical Arts in two of the three levels.

=== Norris University Center ===
Named in the memory of alumnus Lester J. Norris following a $2.5 million donation from his parents, Northwestern's student center was designed by Edward D. Dart, and completed in 1971. It embodies the Brutalist architectural style that held sway on many campuses in the 1970s. The Norris Center serves as a community hub for students, faculty, staff, alumni and guests.

A New Student Center Initiative was drawn up in 2010 by a student-led movement, which called for the creation of a more central and modern facility, and argued that this would help promote a greater sense of community and inclusion on campus. In response, the administration engaged the consulting firm Brailsford and Dunlavey to assess this proposal and conduct research on how best to meet the student body's needs.

On August 3, 2016, Northwestern unveiled a model showcasing a major renovation plan of the existing Norris Center, a modern facility called the University Commons, in hopes to best serve the wider Northwestern community. Led by the Division of Student Affairs with Ennead Architects of New York City and Northwestern's Facility Management, the two-year plan was unanimously approved by the Educational Properties Committee of the university's board of trustees. However, in the interim, no further developments have occurred.

=== Athletics buildings and fields ===
The Northwestern lakefill additionally serves as a home to many of the Northwestern Athletics fields and facilities. Currently, the lakefill houses the Lanny and Sharon Martin Stadium, Lakeside Field, and the Chap and Ethel Hutcheson practice field.

Lanny and Sharon Martin stadium opened March 8, 2016, and houses both the Northwestern Wildcat soccer and lacrosse teams. It includes an artificial turf field, full field lighting, permanent seating for up to 2000 fans and a full color video board with recording equipment. The facility is named after alumni and Trustee J. Landis Martin and his wife, Sharon Martin.

Home of the Northwestern Field Hockey Team, the Northwestern Field Hockey field was built in 1997, as part of the Leonard B. Thomas Athletic Complex. The field includes artificial turf lined for field hockey, a full field lighting and sound system, lighted score board, and permanent seating for up to 300 fans. The field has additionally been the location of the Big Ten Field Hockey Tournament in 2002, 2004, and 2010.

Created as a varsity football athletic practice field, the Chap and Ethel Hutchinson field was opened in the summer of 2016, and is located next to both lakeside field and Martin stadium, alongside the Lake Michigan lakefront.

Completed in 1987, the Henry Crown Sports Pavilion is located on the northern end of the lakefill. The 95,000 sq ft (8,800 m^{2}) pavilion, which includes the Lester J. Norris Aquatics Center, houses a diverse set of exercise equipment, an Olympic-size swimming and diving pool, practice courts, studio space, and massage and sauna services. In 2002, an attachment of the Combe Tennis center, housing six indoor tennis courts was completed. The building itself is commonly referred to as "SPAC" by Northwestern students and faculty, the acronym referencing the “Sports Pavilion” in Henry Crown Sports Pavilion and “Aquatics Center” in Lester J. Norris Aquatics Center.

Announced in late 2015, to provide further support to student athletes and athletic staff on campus, additional renovations and construction began on the Henry Crown Sports Pavilion to include the new Ryan Fieldhouse and Walter Athletics Center. This addition is being constructed adjacent to the current pavilion and will extend further out on the lakefill. The intended project includes the construction of an indoor multi-purpose practice field, nutrition center, dining facility, athletic support services, rebuilding of indoor basketball courts, and office space for athletic administrators and coaches.

=== Kellogg School of Management Global Hub ===
Designed by Toronto architectural firm KPMB, the 410,000-square-foot (38,000 m^{2}) glass building on the north side of the lakefill was opened on March 28, 2017, and includes Northwestern University Kellogg School of Management faculty, staff and students, as well as Weinberg College’s Department of Economics.

The building consists of a Collaboration Plaza, three stories, a 6,000-square-foot (560 m^{2}) visitor center, a two-story White Family Auditorium that holds 350 people, and a Faculty Summit that's also two stories for discussions and debates. Apart from its high technology and flexibility of furniture within classrooms, the building is also notable for its eco-friendly design that will reduce energy consumption by 30% below standard requirements. In 2018, the Hub was awarded LEED platinum designation.
