= Dillo Day =

Annual all-day music festival at Northwestern University

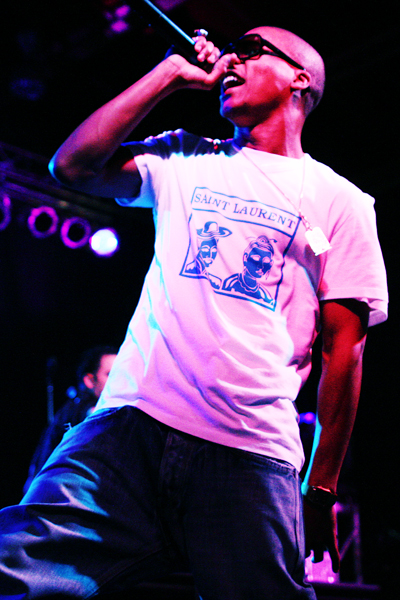
Lupe Fiasco performing at Dillo Day in 2007

Dillo Day is an annual all-day music festival at Northwestern University that takes place at the end of spring quarter on the Lakefill. Started in the 1972/73 school year, it is organized by Mayfest Productions, a Northwestern student group, and is the largest student-run music festival in the country. Northwestern lists Dillo Day as one of its most notable traditions.

== History ==
The festival has its roots in May Day, or Mayfete. Mayfete was a time when students would celebrate the "renunciation of the May Queen of the temporal world for a spiritual one," according to a 1951 history of the event. Although little is known about the early days, May Day was originally a celebration of the women of Northwestern. The crowning of the May Queen was the central event, and the pomp included a Maypole dance and cotillion. May Day expanded to May Week in 1946 to accommodate a women's sing, men's sing, and an honors ceremony.

Armadillo Productions was created in 1972 by two students from Austin, Texas, to honor the official animal of their home state and a concert venue there. They held a “I Don’t Think We’re in Kansas Anymore” festival and fair that had costumes, games, a treasure hunt, and special events. It was held every year until 1976 when it was cancelled due to weather and financial difficulties; but returned the following year as Armadillo Day. That same year, a 10-day assortment of campus programming called Mayfest began, which included Armadillo Day, Greek Week and A&O's Spring Festival. The first outdoor Mayfest concerts were produced by A&O featuring Robert Gordon 5.22.81 and Muddy Waters 5.23.81, staged on one lakefront stage and offered at no cost to students. Mayfest Productions eventually formed from A&O Productions (which historically had booked, promoted and produced all concerts, speakers and events for students throughout the year), producing the Saturday concert event on the shores of Lake Michigan that is known today as Dillo Day. Mayfest Productions, like A&O previously, has earned a reputation for booking major industry artists, and is annually one of the largest and most competitive clubs at Northwestern.

== Organization ==
The festival features a main stage, second stage, food trucks, beer garden, and Dillo Village that hosts art from students and Chicago-area artists, as well as various other games and activities. Dillo Day is open to all Northwestern University students, faculty, and staff. Students are each permitted to bring one additional guest, and a limited number of tickets are reserved for purchase by Evanston residents and Northwestern alumni. The second stage is curated in partnership with an additional campus organization-- currently Northwestern's Black student alliance, For Members Only, who has provided Dillo Day with a historic all-Black lineup on the stage for the past 3 years. In addition to Dillo Day, beginning in 2016, Mayfest Productions hosted annual Battle of the Bands and eventually Battle of the DJs competitions in the weeks leading up to the festival. The winners of these respective events perform on the main stage of Dillo Day that year.

On May 30, 2020, Mayfest Productions hosted Digital Dillo, a virtual replacement for the annual music festival due to the COVID-19 pandemic. Those within the Northwestern community received a link to a livestream where they could watch live artist performances and participate in Q&A sessions with them. The following year, Dillo Day was held as a hybrid festival. This once again featured virtual artist performances and live Q&A's, but also had in-person components across campus the entire week of the festival similar to the original Mayfest. This included Mayfeast, a collection of food trucks outside Deering Library; Mayfit, a thrift shopping event at Norris University Center; Dildo Day, a variety of sex/body positivity events; student art installations on the Lakefill where the festival is traditionally held; a silent disco outside Norris featuring Chicago area DJ's; and screenings of artist performances on and off-campus.

== Past lineups ==
1981

- Robert Gordon
- Muddy Waters

1983

- The Ramones

1988

- Webb Wilder
- Koko Taylor

1993

- Poi Dog Pondering

1997

- Pavement

2001

- The Mighty Mighty Bosstones
- Black-Eyed Peas
- Nymb
- Dismemberment Plan
- All Mighty Senators

2002

- Béla Fleck and the Flecktones
- Mystic
- The Slackers
- Jephreee
- The Pages
- Local Age

2003

- Robert Randolph and the Family Band
- The Crystal Method
- Blackalicious
- Steel Train
- Idlewild
- Troubled Hubble

2004

- The Wailers
- Gavin Degraw
- The Pharcyde
- The Ms
- Michael Tolcher

2005

- George Clinton and the Parliament Funkadelics
- The Black Keys
- Matt Nathanson
- Acceptance

2006

- Ben Folds
- Robert Randolph and the Family Band
- Mae
- High End Trio

2007

- Cake
- The Roots
- Lupe Fiasco
- Pete Francis
- Office

2008

- Common
- Broken Social Scene
- Ted Leo and the Pharmacists
- Third Eye Blind
- The Cool Kids
- A DJ set by Northwestern University alumnus William Butler, member of Arcade Fire
- A DJ set by Flosstradamus
- Clash Gordon
- DJ Sicarii

2009

- N.E.R.D
- Estelle
- Tally Hall
- Mike Posner
- The Decemberists

2010

- Regina Spektor
- Guster
- Practical Tactical
- Rhymefest
- Super Mash Bros
- Nelly

2011

- B.o.B
- Chiddy Bang
- New Pornographers
- N.A.S.A.
- Kill the Noise
- Guns & Sons
- Peter Bjorn and John

2012

- Cold War Kids
- Kendrick Lamar
- Reel Big Fish
- Big Boi
- Steve Aoki

2013

- Walk the Moon
- Danny Brown
- Smash Mouth
- Lunice
- Wiz Khalifa

2014

Main Stage

- Chance The Rapper
- 2 Chainz
- Ryan Hemsworth
- OK Go
- Cults

WNUR x IndieU Stage

- Tink
- The GTW
- Sirr Tmo
- Teen Witch Fan Club
- RUNNING

2015 (Note: Dillo Day was canceled in 2015 due to weather)

Main Stage

- Charli XCX
- Odesza
- Miguel
- A$AP Ferg
- Saint Motel

WNUR Stage

- Sicko Mobb
- Cakes da Killa
- Ben Aqua
- Archie Powell & The Exports
- K Rizz

2016

Main Stage

- Schoolboy Q
- Cashmere Cat
- Anderson .Paak & The Free Nationals
- The Mowgli's
- Hayden James

WNUR Stage

- Derrick Carter
- Smino
- Mister Wallace
- Colleen Green
- Akenya

Battle of the Bands Winner

- DIAL UP

2017

Main Stage

- MGMT
- Gramatik
- Little Simz
- DRAM
- Porches

WNUR x Nongshim Stage

- Marie Davidson
- MikeQ
- Downtown Boys
- Chynna Rogers
- Bunny

Band & DJ winner (respectively)

- Prez Harris & Friends
- Onnij x Ouyang

2018

Main Stage

- Young the Giant
- TOKiMONSTA
- Whitney
- Joey Bada$$
- Daniel Caesar

WNUR x Nongshim Stage

- Cupcakke
- Dos Santos
- Violence
- Jasmine Infiniti
- Guerilla Toss

Band & DJ winner (respectively)

- Wop St. Bass Ritual
- EJ3

2019

Main Stage

- Hippo Campus
- Teyana Taylor
- Anna Lunoe
- Daya
- A$AP Ferg

FMO Stage

- Monique Heart
- Kota the Friend
- DFree Da Vinci
- Caleborate
- Amindi

Band & DJ winner (respectively)

- FIZZ
- Luminosity

2020 (Virtual Due to COVID-19)

Note: due to the COVID-19 pandemic, there were no student acts during the 2020 livestream.

Main Stage

- The Regrettes
- Rico Nasty
- Jai Wolf

FMO Stage

- Azjah
- Yung Kaygo
- Mir Fontane

2021 (Virtual Due to COVID-19)

Main Stage

- Playboi Carti
- Ken Car$on
- KAYTRANADA
- beabadoobee
- Omar Apollo

FMO Stage

- Blxst
- Brittney Carter
- Brandon Banks

Band & DJ winner (respectively)

- Wes Park and the Blueberry Boo Boo Babies
- Sydco (won in 2020)

2022

Main Stage

- Dominic Fike
- Tinashe
- Sean Kingston
- Remi Wolf
- Cochise
- Vicetone

FMO Stage

- Taylor Bennett
- Kari Faux
- Scorey
- Jordan Hawkins

Band, DJ, and Rapper winners (respectively)

- Poor Man's Yacht Club
- Moondog
- Ciel

2023

Main Stage

- Offset
- TiaCorine
- Briston Maroney
- RINI
- J.Worra

FMO Stage

- Lil Kayla
- BIGBABYGUCCI
- Zeph France
- Blvck Svm

Battle of the Artists Winners

- DJ Lu
- Muse etc.
- Tavern

2024

Main Stage

- Maude Latour
- LF System
- Lupe Fiasco
- Amaarae
- Bakar
- Swae Lee

FMO Stage

- Nada!
- Adanna Duru
- Maiya The Don
- YungManny

FMO Student Artists

- Ciel McDaniels
- TiggyBouf
- KenDu!

Band & DJ winner (respectively)

- Mee-ow Band
- Vitamin K

2025

Main Stage

- nimino
- Slow Pulp
- Iann Dior
- Ravyn Lenae
- Natasha Bedingfield

FMO Stage

- Giift
- Skaiwater

FMO Student Artists

- Murichu

Band & DJ winner (respectively)

- Inertia
- Perl

2026

Main Stage

- Jae Stephens
- Glaive (musician)
- Daya
- Bossman DLOW
- Malcolm Todd

FMO Stage

- Nali
- DJ Faaji
- 310Babii
- Cochise
- BabyChiefDoIt

The Burrow (WNUR x KASA x CSA x MENA)

- Lana Lubany
- Friko
- Tiffany Day

Band & DJ winner (respectively)

- The Beckfast Club
- The Mee-Ow Band
