= Lindheimer Astrophysical Research Center =

Observatory in Illinois, US

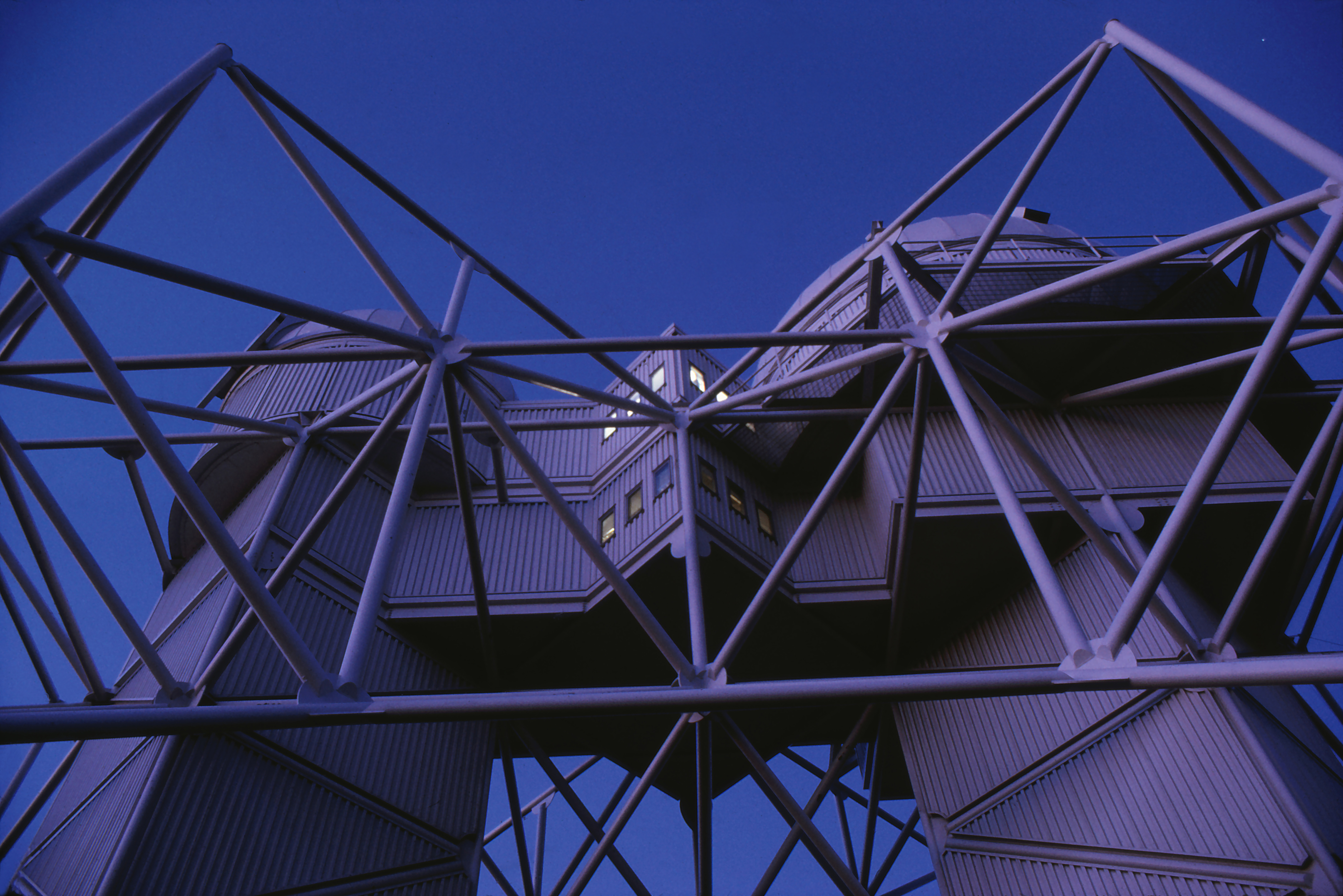
- Lindheimer Center in 1974
- Alternative names: Lindheimer Observatory
- Named after: Benjamin F. Lindheimer
- Organization: Northwestern University
- Location: Evanston, Illinois, U.S.
- Coordinates: 42°3′34.25″N 87°40′13.53″W
- Altitude: 600 ft (180 m)
- Established: 1966
- Closed: 1995

Telescopes
- 1. Boller & Chivens Cassegrain: 40 inches (1,000 mm) reflecting telescope
- 2. Boller & Chivens Cassegrain: 16 inches (410 mm) reflecting telescope
- Related media on Commons

Lindheimer Astrophysical Research Center was an astronomical observatory used for teaching and research, located on the Evanston, Illinois campus of Northwestern University. The structure was built in 1966 and was demolished in 1995.

== History ==
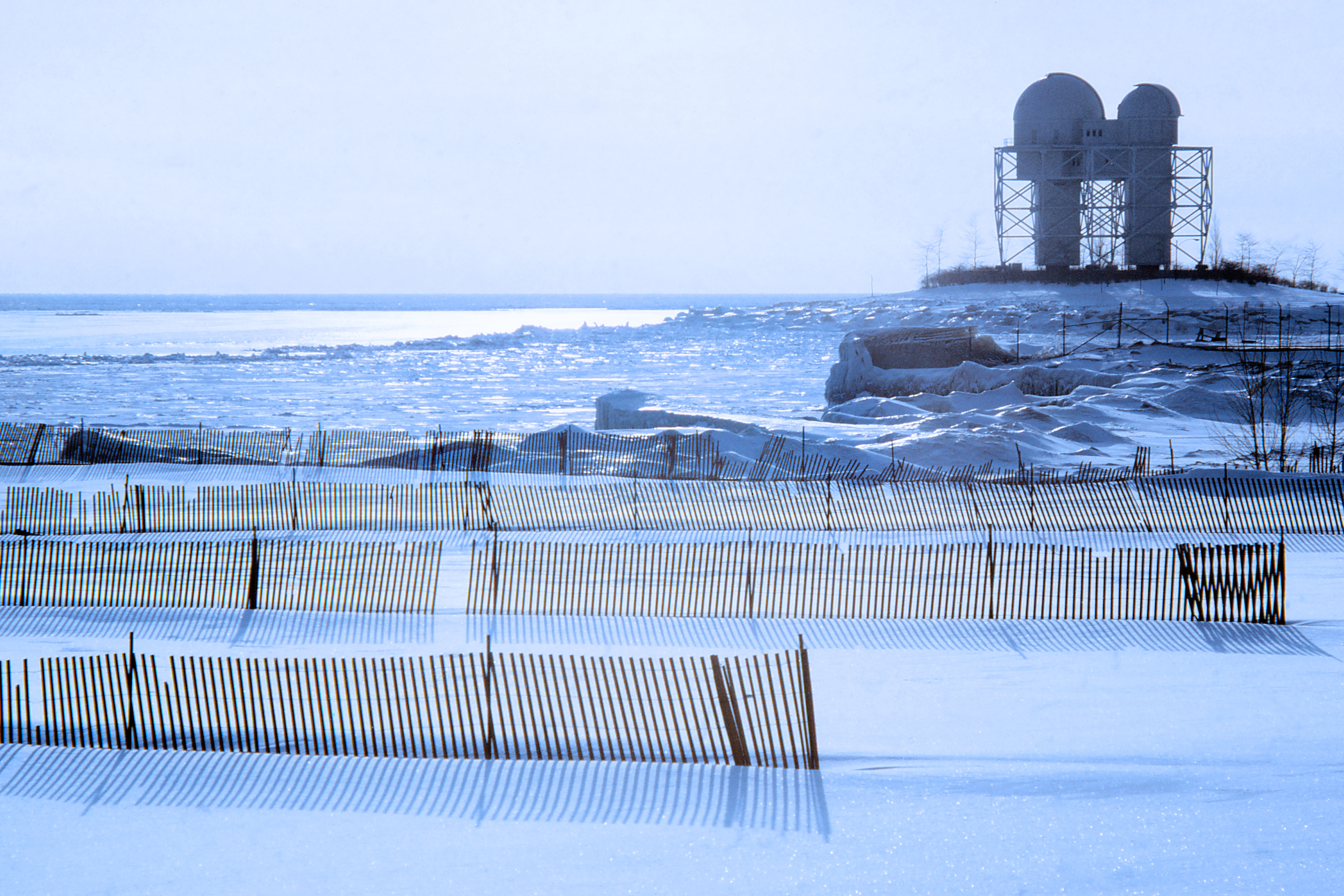
Looking south, from the campus's North Beach

The Center was constructed in 1966 on the Lake Michigan shore in the northeast corner of the recently completed Northwestern University Lakefill and its twin domes and distinctive crisscrossed supporting braces instantly made it a campus landmark. That year, the Chicago Chapter of the American Institute of Architects designated the structure as outstanding in its class.

The observatory building which housed the Center originally cost approximately one million dollars. It was funded by a gift from the estate of prominent Chicago businessman and sporting executive Benjamin F. Lindheimer along with a grant from the National Science Foundation. The telescopes were funded mainly by grants from the A. Montgomery Ward Foundation, the Hans D. Isenberg Foundation, and the National Science Foundation.

The facility's domes contained two large telescopes manufactured by premium instrument maker Boller and Chivens. Beneath the smaller dome was a 16 in (410 mm) Cassegrain reflector, intended mainly for student use. Beneath the larger dome was a 40 in (1,000 mm) Cassegrain equipped with a rapid-scanning optical spectrometer, intended especially for astronomical research.

=== Demolition ===
By the 1990s, the Center's usefulness had diminished, in part because of the poor "seeing" conditions of the Chicago area, where light pollution and atmospheric turbulence are persistent problems, and in part because of the need for expensive remediation of the structure due to the presence of asbestos insulation and lead-based paint. Accordingly, the University decided, despite expressions of public support for the well-known landmark, that the cost-effective course of action was to tear down the Center. The telescopes were donated to Lowell Observatory in Flagstaff, Arizona and the demolition proceeded in mid-September, 1995.

The explosive charges used for the first demolition attempt resulted in the whole structure remaining intact and simply listing to one side, still held firmly together by its network of external supporting braces. These charges were set based on incorrect information on the superstructure, which was composed of 8 and 10 in (200 and 250 mm) pipe thought to be 0.5 in (13 mm) thick but actually 1 in (25 mm) thick. Subsequently, the braces were cut away using large industrial cutting torches and attempts were made to pull it down with winches. Eventually multiple large cranes had to be brought in to assist by tearing it apart, piece-by-piece.

== Current land use ==
Today the site is green space adjoined by a parking lot.

Gallery

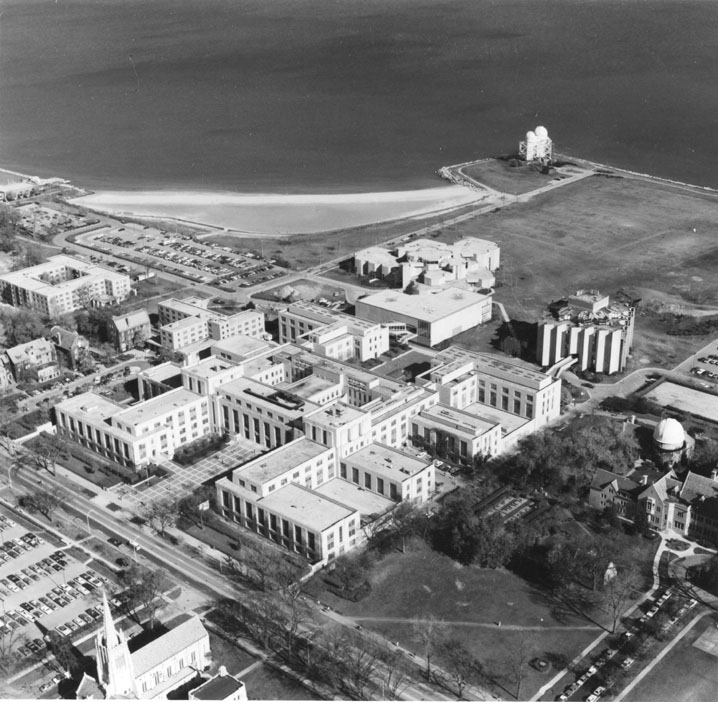
Lindheimer Center (top) in 1977

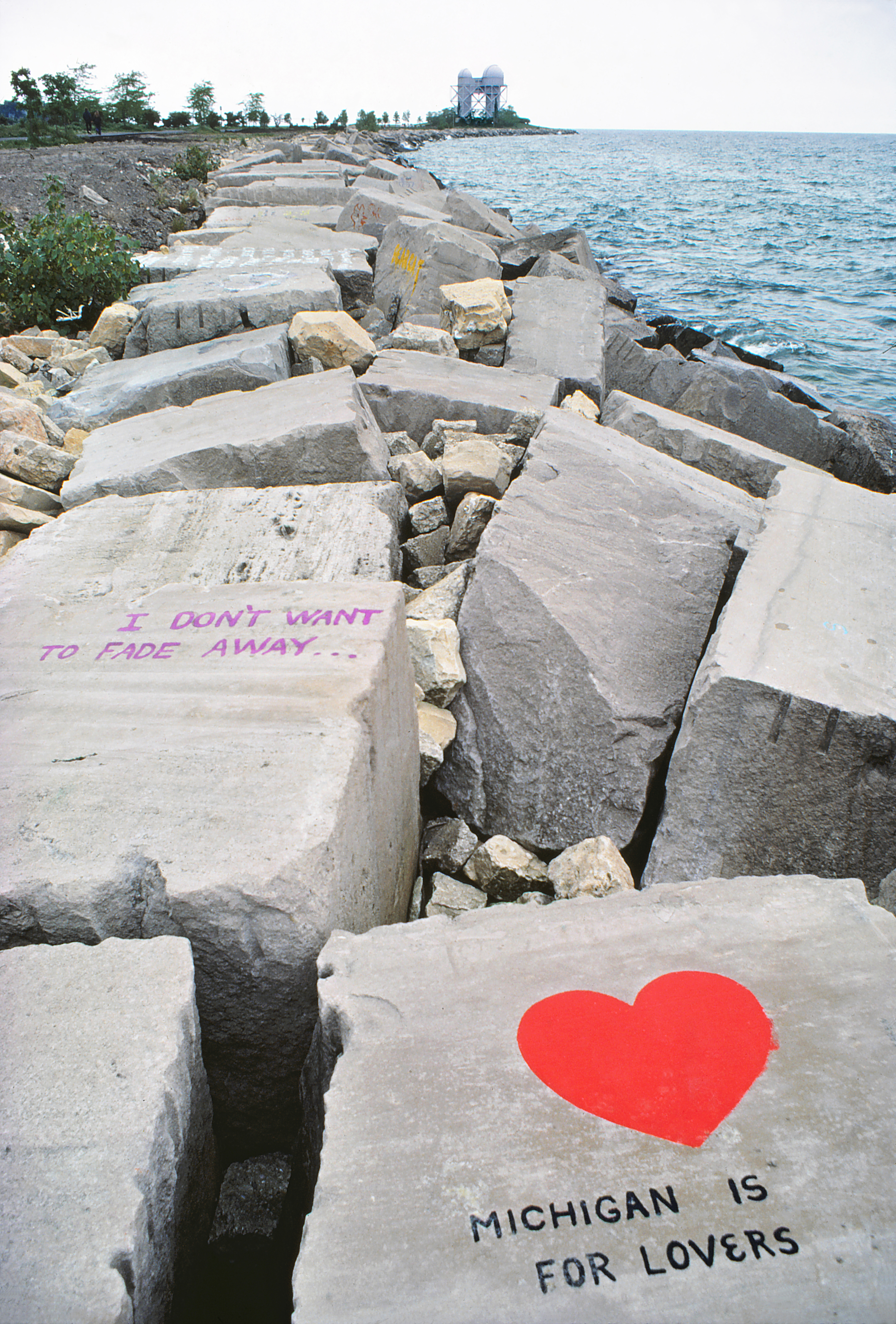
Looking north along the Lakefill seawall

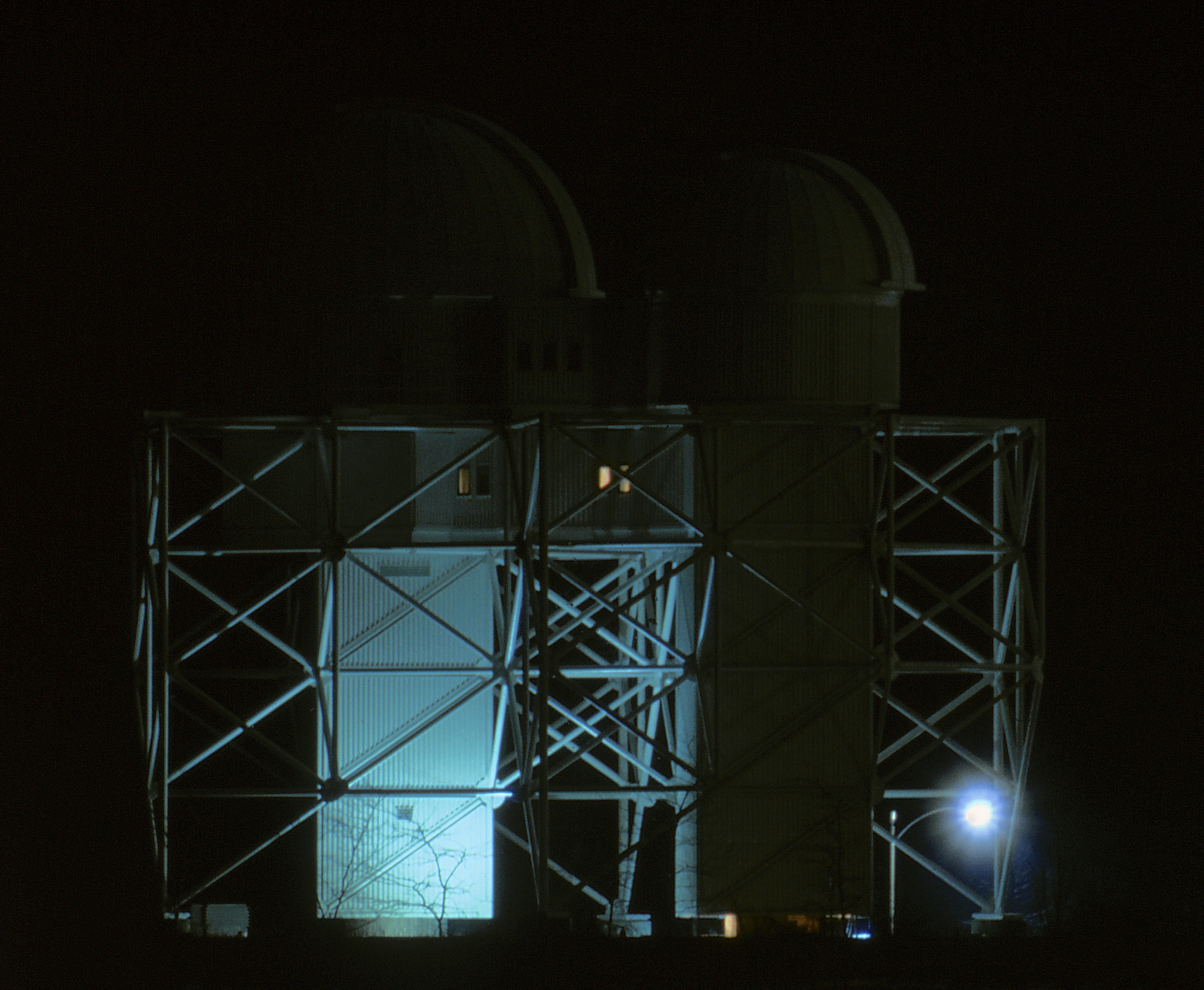
At night in 1974

== See also ==
- Dearborn Observatory
- List of astronomical observatories
