= Mee-Ow Show =

The Mee-Ow Show is the longest-running university student written and produced improv, sketch comedy, and music show in the United States. Shows are produced annually by students at Northwestern University in Evanston, Illinois. It was founded in 1974 by two students: Josh Lazar and Paul Warshauer. The original Mee-Ow Show, "Just in Time", was the first performance in the newly constructed McCormick Auditorium in Norris University Center (Northwestern's student union). The show was completely transformed to an Improvisational Comedy Sketch Show in 1975 and 1976 by Bill Nuss and Dusty Kay. They took their inspiration from "The Second City" in Chicago and "Kentucky Fried Theater" in Los Angeles. That format survives to this day.

The show has been a significant part of the Northwestern theater and comedy scene ever since. In 2024 The Mee-Ow Show ensemble celebrated its 50th anniversary.

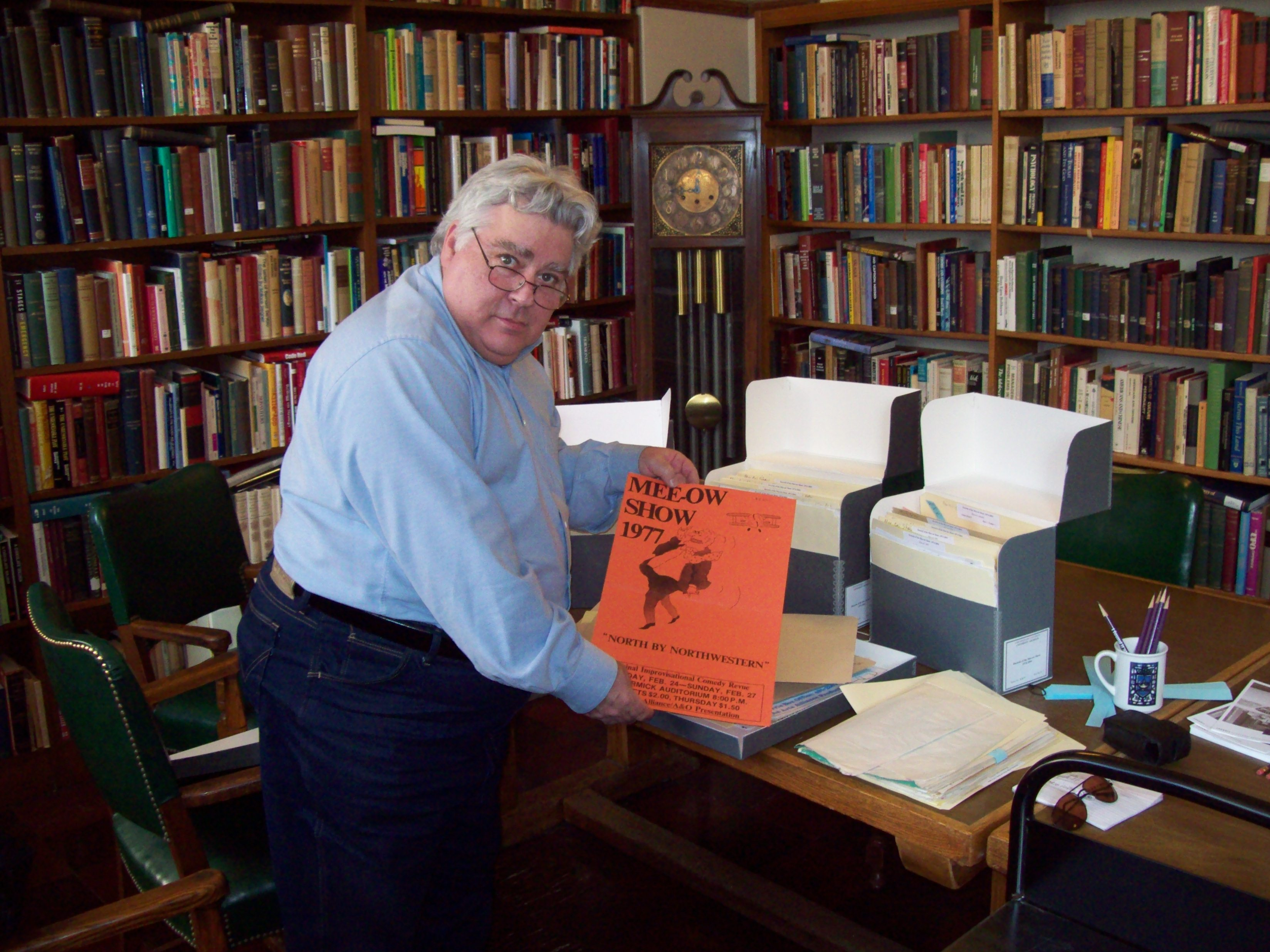
Creator Paul Warshauer with Mee-Ow memorabilia, in the Northwestern University Archives

== History ==
=== Origins ===
The Mee-Ow Show was founded as an alternative to the Waa-Mu Show, a long-standing revue at Northwestern University. Co-founders Paul Warshauer and Josh Lazar aimed to create a show that would embrace a wider range of creative expression, including comedy, music, and poetry. The name "Mee-Ow" is a nod to the university's Wildcat mascot and serves as a parody of the Waa-Mu name.

The group's first performance was held in the McCormick Auditorium of the Norris University Center in 1974. The show included sketch comedy, poetry, and dance, setting the standard for the show's variety.

==== Development and changes over time ====
The Mee-Ow Show evolved over the years, with a focus on short-form improv and sketch comedy. Short form sketches typically last between two and four minutes, while the improv games performed on stage are usually under three minutes. In contrast to long-form improv (which can last up to 30 minutes), Mee-Ow's short-form approach emphasizes rapid-fire jokes and quick resolution.

A live rock band was introduced in 1984 as the show celebrated its 10th anniversary, a tradition that continues to this day. The Mee-Ow Show puts on two main performances during the Winter Quarter and has occasionally held an improv show in the spring.

===== Legacy and impact =====
Mee-Ow has reported a significant alumni network, with several members going on to achieve notoriety in television, comedy, and acting. The Daily Northwestern reported that among its notable alumni are Ana Gasteyer, Julia Louis-Dreyfus and Seth Meyers. The 40th anniversary of the Mee-Ow Show in 2014, was reportedly marked by performances and the participation of alumni, celebrating the ensemble's long-standing presence at Northwestern University.

==== Archival records ====
An archive of the Mee-Ow Show is maintained at the Northwestern University Archives in the Deering Library, documenting its history from inception to the present.
