= Benjamin F. Lindheimer =

American horse track owner (1889–1960)

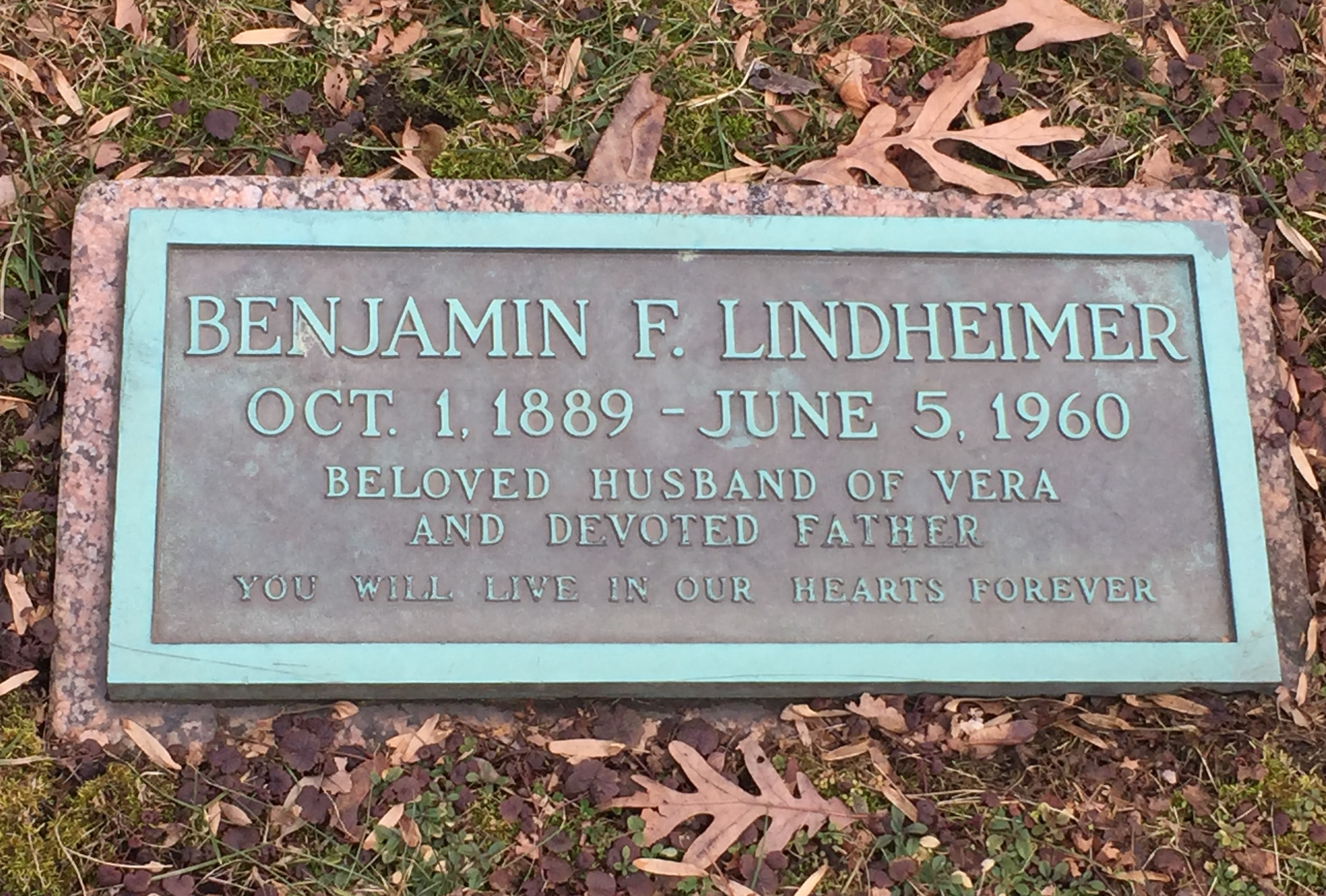
- Grave of Benjamin Franklin Lindheimer
- Born: October 1, 1889
- Died: June 5, 1960 (aged 70); Beverly Hills, California
- Resting place: Rosehill Cemetery, Chicago
- Occupations: Race track and football team owner
- Political party: Democrat
- Board member of: Arlington Park; Washington Park Race Track; Los Angeles Dons; All-America Football Conference
- Spouse: Vera Burnstine
- Children: Marjorie
- Honors: Chicagoland Sports Hall of Fame

Benjamin Franklin Lindheimer (October 1, 1889 – June 5, 1960) was an American businessman who owned Chicago's Washington Park Race Track from 1935 until his death in 1960 and was the majority shareholder and managing director of Arlington Park Race Track. He also owned the Los Angeles Dons of the All-America Football Conference.

Widely respected Hall of Fame trainer Jimmy Jones of Calumet Farm was quoted by Sports Illustrated as saying that Lindheimer "was the savior of Chicago racing" and that "Arlington Park became the finest track in the world—certainly the finest I've ever been on." Lindheimer promoted the 1955 match race broadcast by CBS Television in which Preakness and Belmont Stakes winner Nashua defeated Kentucky Derby winner, Swaps.

In 1932, Lindheimer managed the election campaign for Henry Horner, who was elected Democratic governor of Illinois.

Benjamin Lindheimer died in 1960 at his vacation home in Beverly Hills, California. His remains were returned to Chicago for burial in Rosehill Cemetery. Following its creation, Benjamin Lindheimer was inducted in the Chicagoland Sports Hall of Fame. Long involved with the business, adopted daughter Marjorie Lindheimer Everett assumed management of the racetracks. Funds from his estate were used by his widow to create the Lindheimer Astrophysical Research Center at Northwestern University.
