= Han Kuo-Huang =

American ethnomusicologist and musician

Han Kuo-Huang (Chinese: 韓國鐄; pinyin: Hán Guóhuáng) is a Chinese-born American ethnomusicologist and musician. He is Emeritus Professor at Northern Illinois University and Adjunct Professor of Ethnomusicology at the University of Kentucky.

== Early life and education ==
Han was born in Xiamen (Amoy), China on February 19, 1936, and grew up in Taiwan. He obtained his bachelor's degree in Taiwan. In 1960 he assisted Elizabeth (Whittington) Hovhaness, the wife of the American composer Alan Hovhaness, in obtaining recordings of Chinese and Taiwanese music during her trip to Taiwan, and in 1962 served as translator for composer Lou Harrison.

=== United States ===
Han eventually relocated to the United States, and obtained U.S. citizenship. He received both his M.M. and Ph.D. degrees from Northwestern University and served as professor of music for over 30 years at Northern Illinois University in DeKalb, Illinois, retiring in 2003. He later served as professor of music at the University of Kentucky in Lexington, Kentucky for several more years before retiring again.

He specializes in Chinese music as well as gamelan (both Balinese and Javanese) and directs these ensembles, formerly in the Asian Ensemble of Northern Illinois University and now at the University of Kentucky. His Chinese music ensemble from Northern Illinois University, formed in the late 1970s, was the first such ensemble at a North American university, and toured the United States and East Asia.

Han has a particular interest in the subject of music education, with an emphasis on the teaching of Asian musics. He has published widely in both Chinese and English, with twelve books and numerous articles appearing in journals and music reference works, and textbooks.

== Personal life ==
Han lives in Lexington, Kentucky with his wife Maria.

=== Writings ===
- 1974 - The Use of the Marian Antiphons in Renaissance Motets. Ph.D. dissertation. Evanston, Illinois: Northwestern University.
- 1992 - The Lion's Roar: Chinese Luogu Percussion Ensembles. Book and CD set. Danbury, Connecticut: World Music Press.

=== Discography ===
- 1981 - West Meets East: Chinese and Balinese Music. Performed by the Asian Music Ensemble, Northern Illinois University; Han Kuo-Huang, director. LP. New York: Folkways Records. Recorded in the Recital Hall, Music Building, Northern Illinois University, DeKalb. Side 1, band 1, and side 2, band 1, were recorded in December 1980; all other pieces were recorded in December 1978.
