= Pick-Staiger Concert Hall =

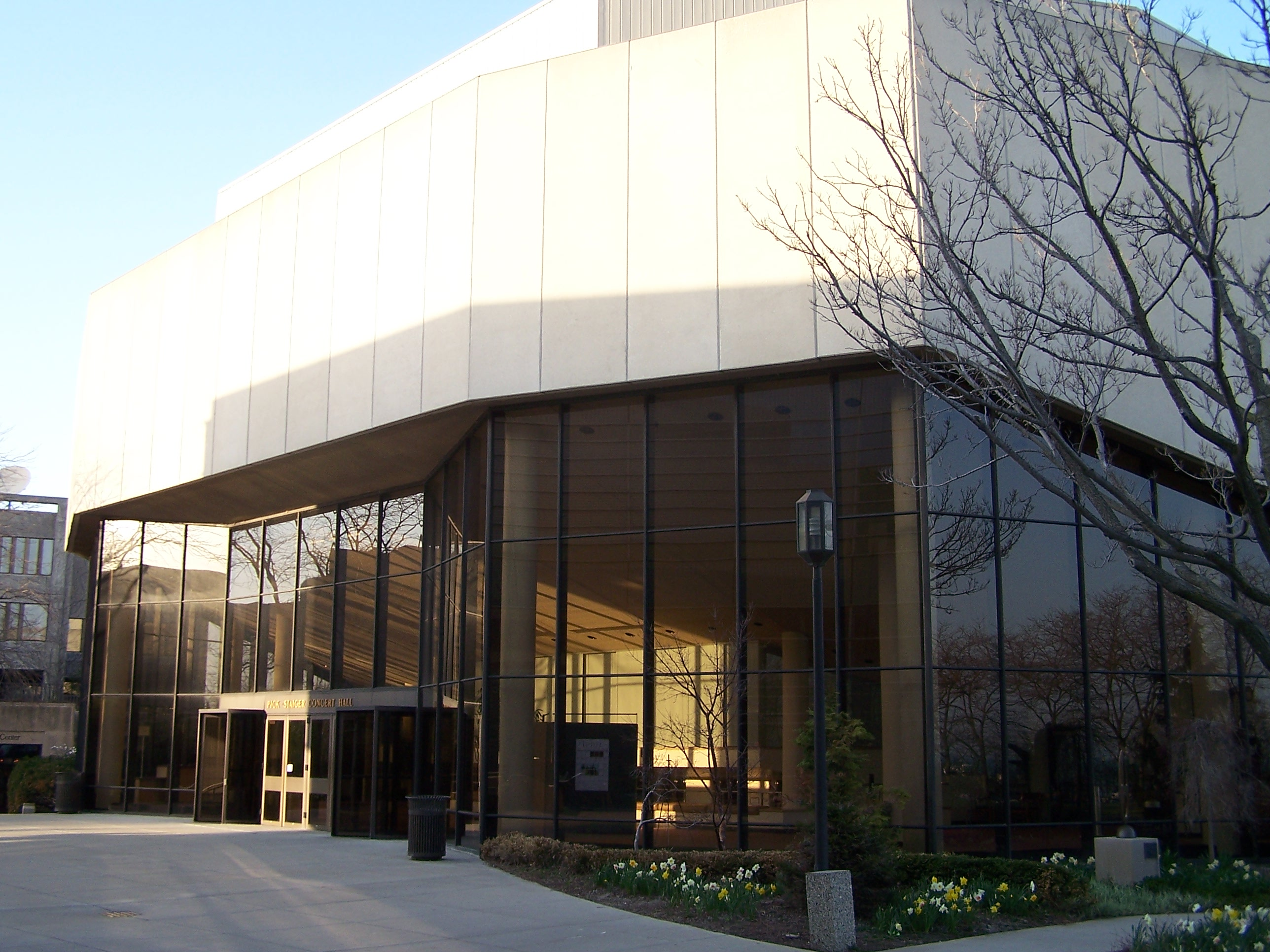

- Location within Chicago metropolitan area Pick-Staiger Concert Hall (Illinois) Pick-Staiger Concert Hall (the United States)

General information
- Type: Concert hall
- Location: 50 Arts Circle Drive
- Coordinates: 42°03′10″N 87°40′19.9″W
- Completed: 1975

Dimensions
- Other dimensions: 1,003 seating capacity

Design and construction
- Architect: Edward D. Dart of Loebl, Schlossman, Dart & Hackl

Pick-Staiger Concert Hall is a concert hall on the campus of Northwestern University in Evanston, Illinois. The hall was donated by hotel executive Albert Pick Jr. and his brother-in-law Charles Staiger, and named for Corinne Frada Pick, Pick's wife, and Albert Pick's sister Pauline Pick Staiger, Staiger's late wife. The building was constructed mostly from precast concrete and glass and seats. All 1003 seats have an unobstructed view of the stage. It also includes thirty plastic dish-shaped panels over the stage. There is also adjustable acoustical drapery which can be adjusted to meet the particular requirements of each performance.

== Architecture ==
The building was designed by renowned Mid-Century modern architect Edward D. Dart of Loebl, Schlossman, Dart & Hackl.
