= Edward D. Dart =

American architect (1922–1975)

- Born: Edouard Dupaquier Dart; May 28, 1922; New Orleans, Louisiana, U.S.
- Died: July 9, 1975 (aged 53); Barrington Hills, Illinois, U.S.
- Other name: Ned
- Education: Isidore Newman School; Woodberry Forest School
- Occupation: Architect
- Spouse: Wilhelmina Plansoen

Edward D. Dart, FAIA (May 28, 1922 – July 9, 1975), born Edouard Dupaquier Dart and known as Ned by those close to him, was a Mid-Century modern American architect.

== Early life ==
Dart was born in New Orleans to parents of French descent. Dart attended the Isidore Newman School in New Orleans and the Woodberry Forest School on Virginia. After two years at the University of Virginia, he would enlist in the marines. His pilot training would begin in June 1942. Dart flew bombers in the pacific during World War II.

On January 19, 1946, Dart married the former Wilhelmina Plansoen, a Duke University alumna.

After the military he enrolled at Yale. He studied under the tutelage of Richard M. Bennett at Yale School of Architecture, whence he graduated in 1949. At Yale Dart also studied under Pietro Belluschi, Marcel Breuer, Richard Neutra, Louis Kahn, Eero Saarinen, Harold Spitznagel, and Paul Schweikher, whom he later worked under in Roselle, IL from 1949 to 1950.

== Career ==
One of Chicago's most distinguished architects, Dart was made a Fellow of the American Institute of Architects at age 44 and garnered 18 AIA awards. He developed his personal design style of using natural materials, incorporating a building into its site and free- flowing spaces while at Yale.

== Death and legacy ==
Dart died suddenly on July 9, 1975. At the time of his death, he was a resident of Barrington Hills, Illinois. The cause of death was an aneurysm while completing a significant commercial development, Water Tower Place. The archives of the Ryerson & Burnham Libraries, located at the Art Institute of Chicago, house a permanent collection of his works, donated in 1999 by his sister Susan.

== Work ==
From 1965, Dart was a partner in the Chicago firm of Loebl Schlossman Bennett & Dart. Between 1949 and 1968 he designed 52 custom houses, 26 custom churches and many commercial structures. His notable buildings include:

- St. Augustine's Episcopal Church, Gary, Indiana, 1958
- Richard E. and Charlotte Henrich House, 1964
- St. Procopius Abbey and Monastery, Lisle, Illinois, 1967
- St. Luke's United Methodist Church, Indianapolis, Indiana, 1968
- Norris University Center at Northwestern University, 1971
- Pick-Staiger Concert Hall at Northwestern University, 1975
- Water Tower Place on Chicago's Magnificent Mile, 1975

=== Lost works ===
- John McCutcheon House, Lake Forest, Illinois, built 1958, demolished 1992.
- Lions Memorial Park Pool House, Mount Prospect, Illinois, built 1956, demolished 1980s.
- Robert Hunker House, Barrington, Illinois, built 1954, demolished 1980s.
- Henry P. Dart, Jr. family residence, Thetford, Vermont, built 1949, demolished 2005.
- Erskine Wilder family residence, Barrington, Illinois, built 1959. Demolished 1992.
- Emmanuel Presbyterian Church Chicago, Illinois, built 1963, demolished 2007.
- Midway Studios Gallery, University of Chicago, built 1972, demolished 2009.
- 116 East Elm; Wheaton, Illinois, built 1953, demolished 2013.
- Jel Sert Company, Bellwood, Illinois built 1961, demolished 2013.
- 1021 Lake Cook Road, Highland Park, IL, demolished 2016.
- Crown House, 350 Sunrise Circle, Glencoe, IL, built 1965, demolished 2019.

== Gallery ==
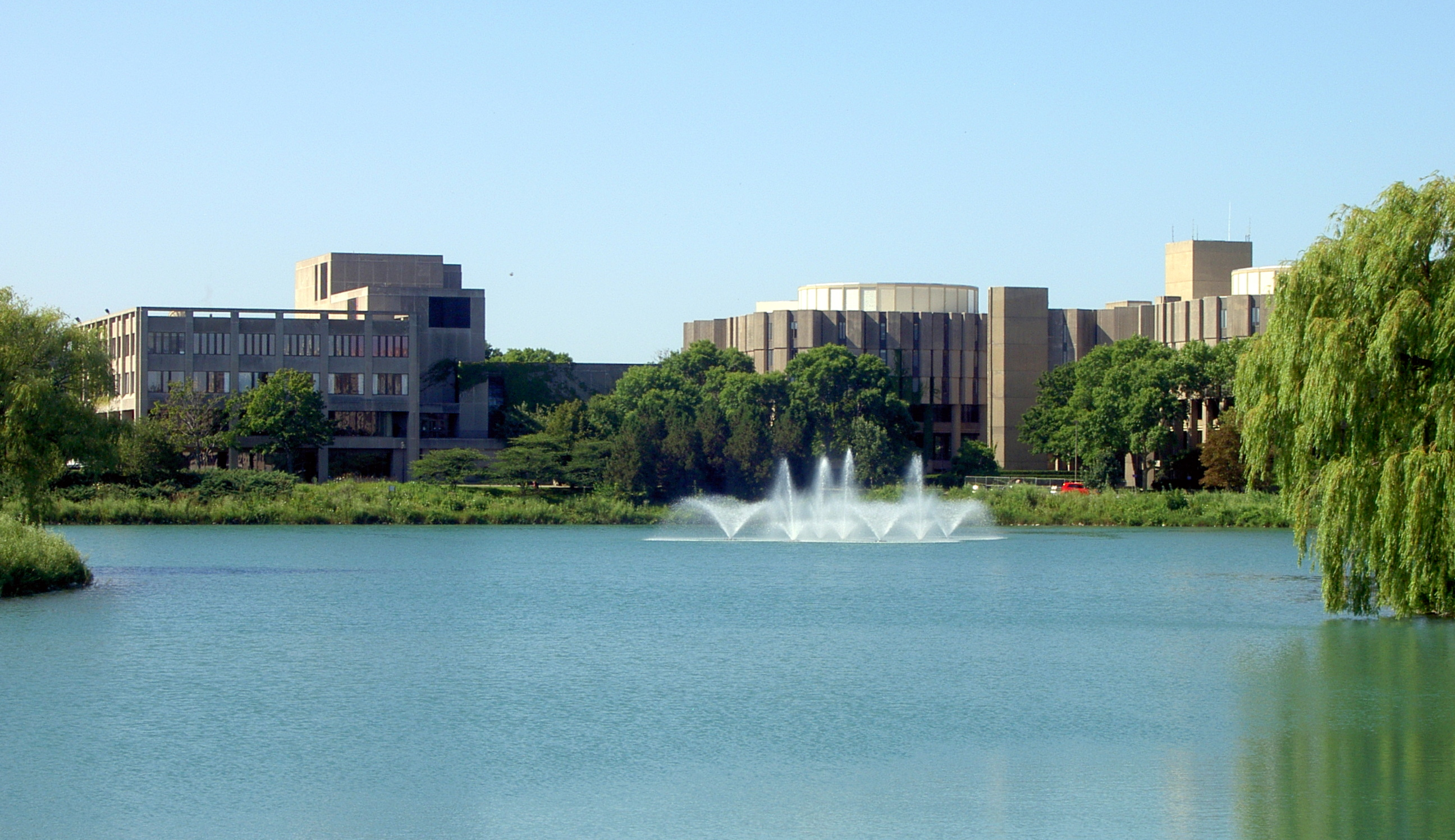
Norris University Center (left) at Northwestern University in Summer

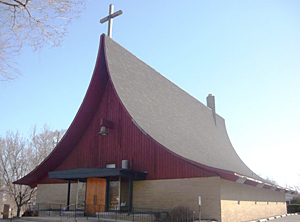
St. Augustine's Episcopal Church (Gary, Indiana)

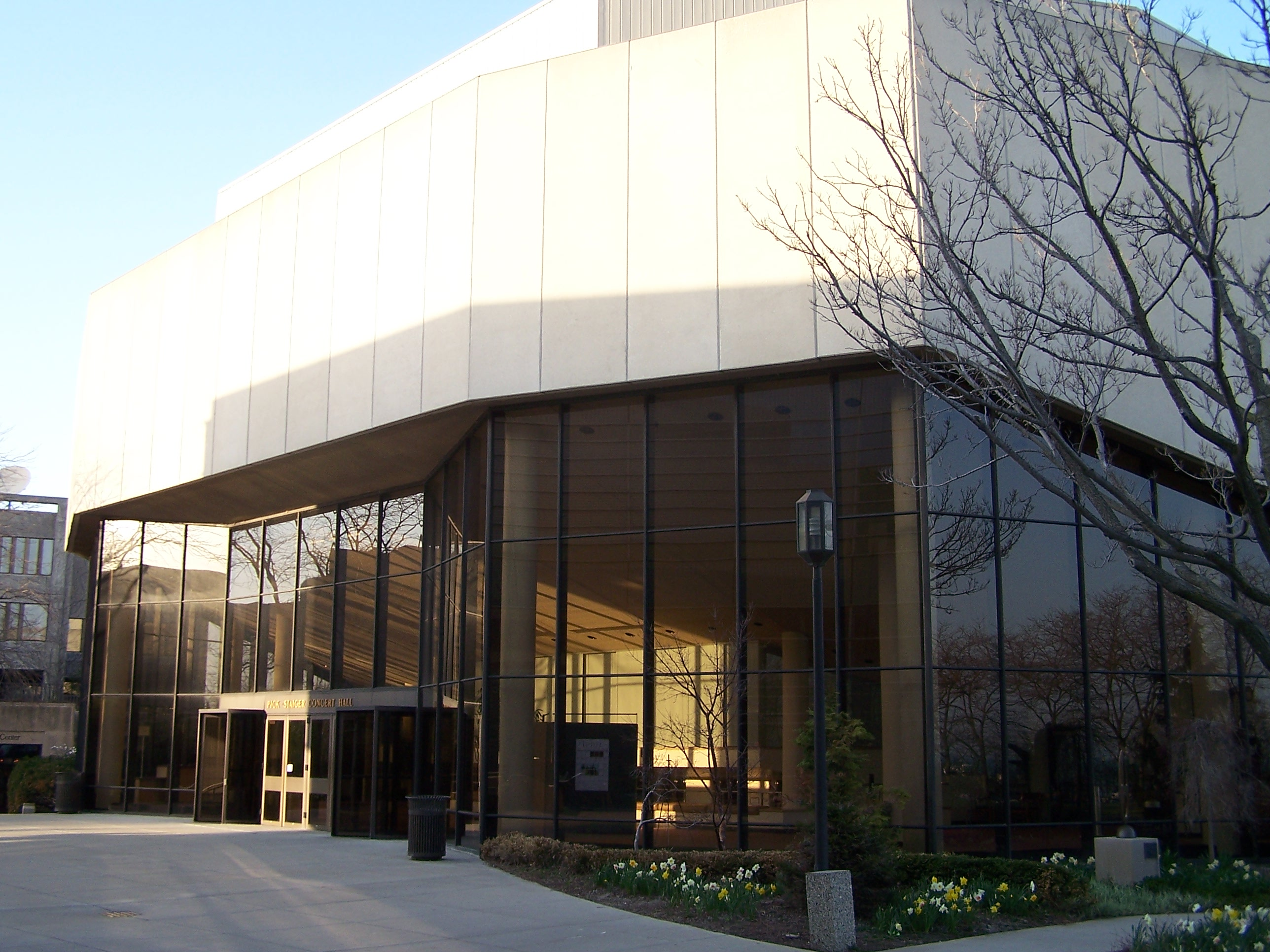
Pick-Staiger Concert Hall at Northwestern University

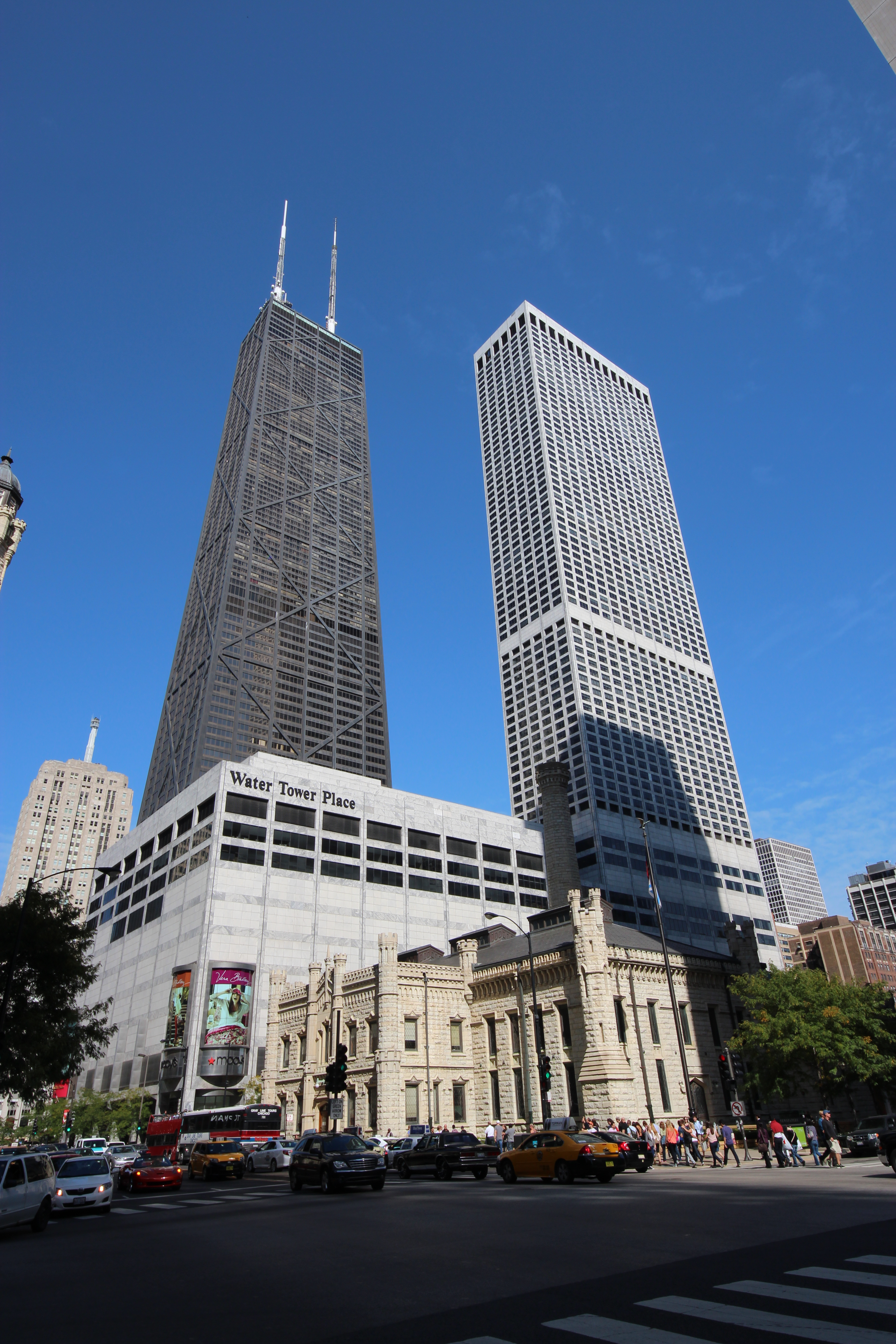
View of Water Tower Place (mall on left, skyscraper on right), with Chicago Avenue Pumping Station in foreground, John Hancock Center in background

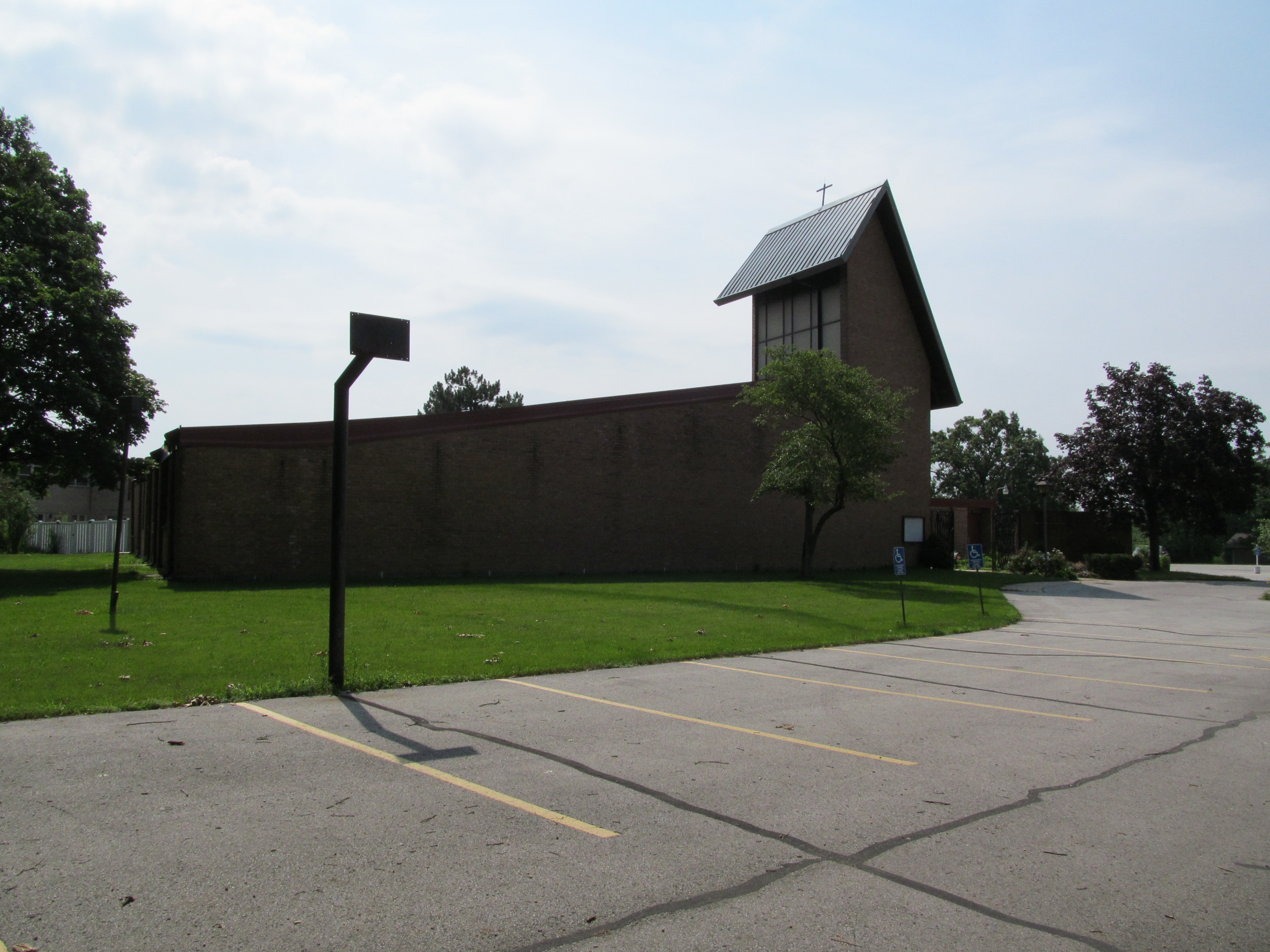
Lansing Presbyterian Church in Lansing, Illinois

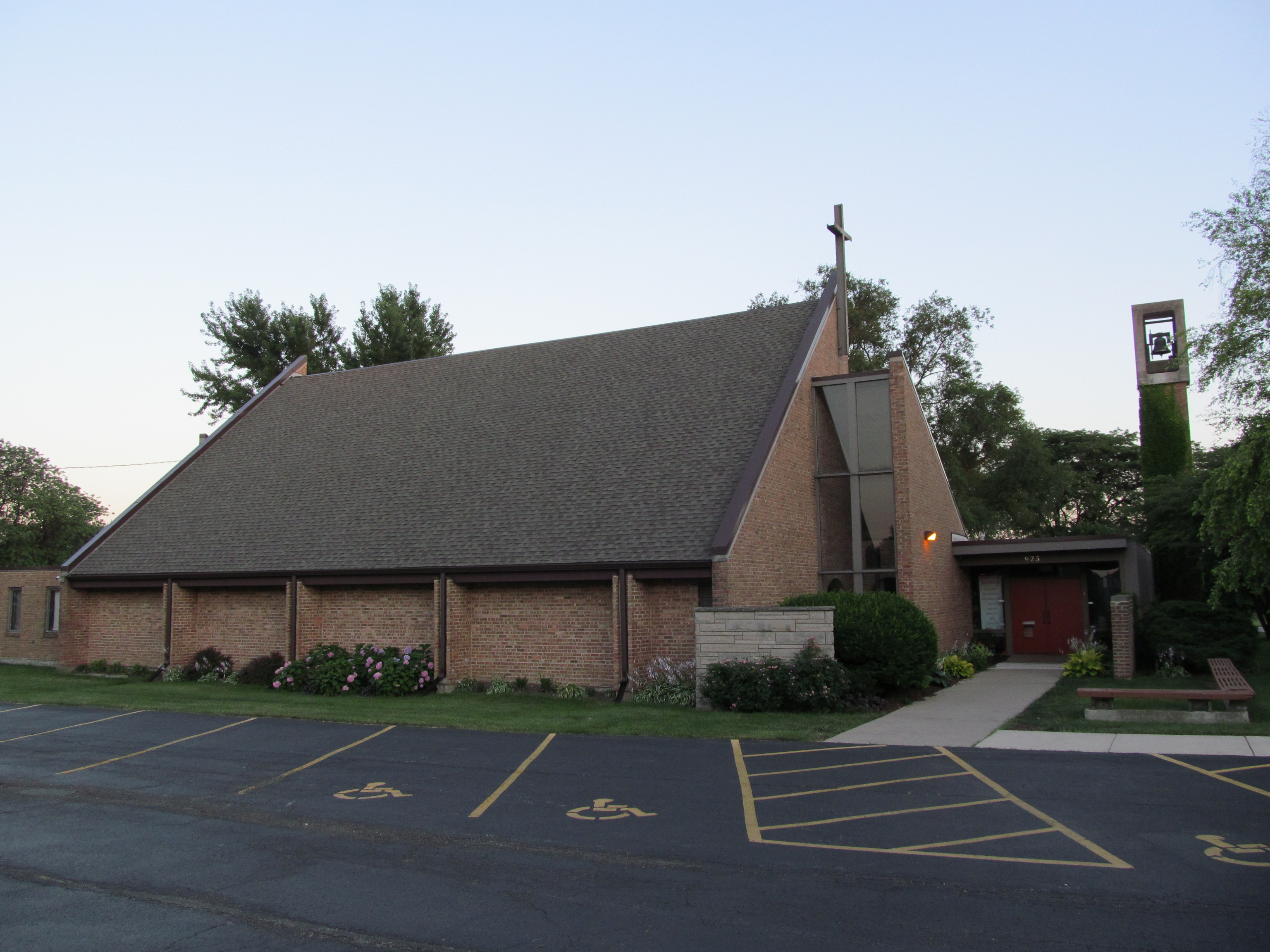
Emmaus Community, formerly St. Ambrose Episcopal Church in Chicago Heights, Illinois

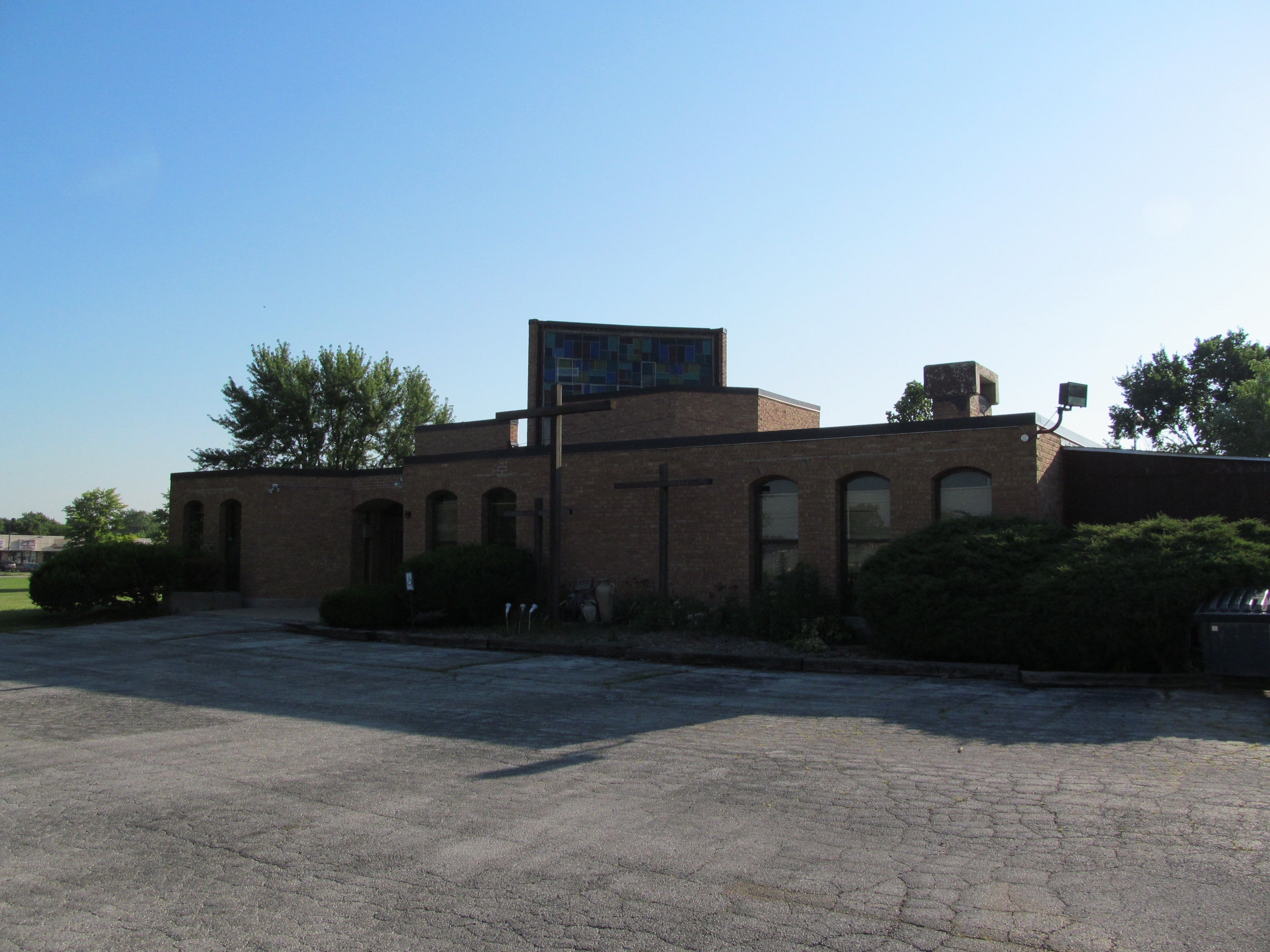
Jubilee Faith Community, formerly House of Prayer Lutheran in Country Club Hills, Illinois

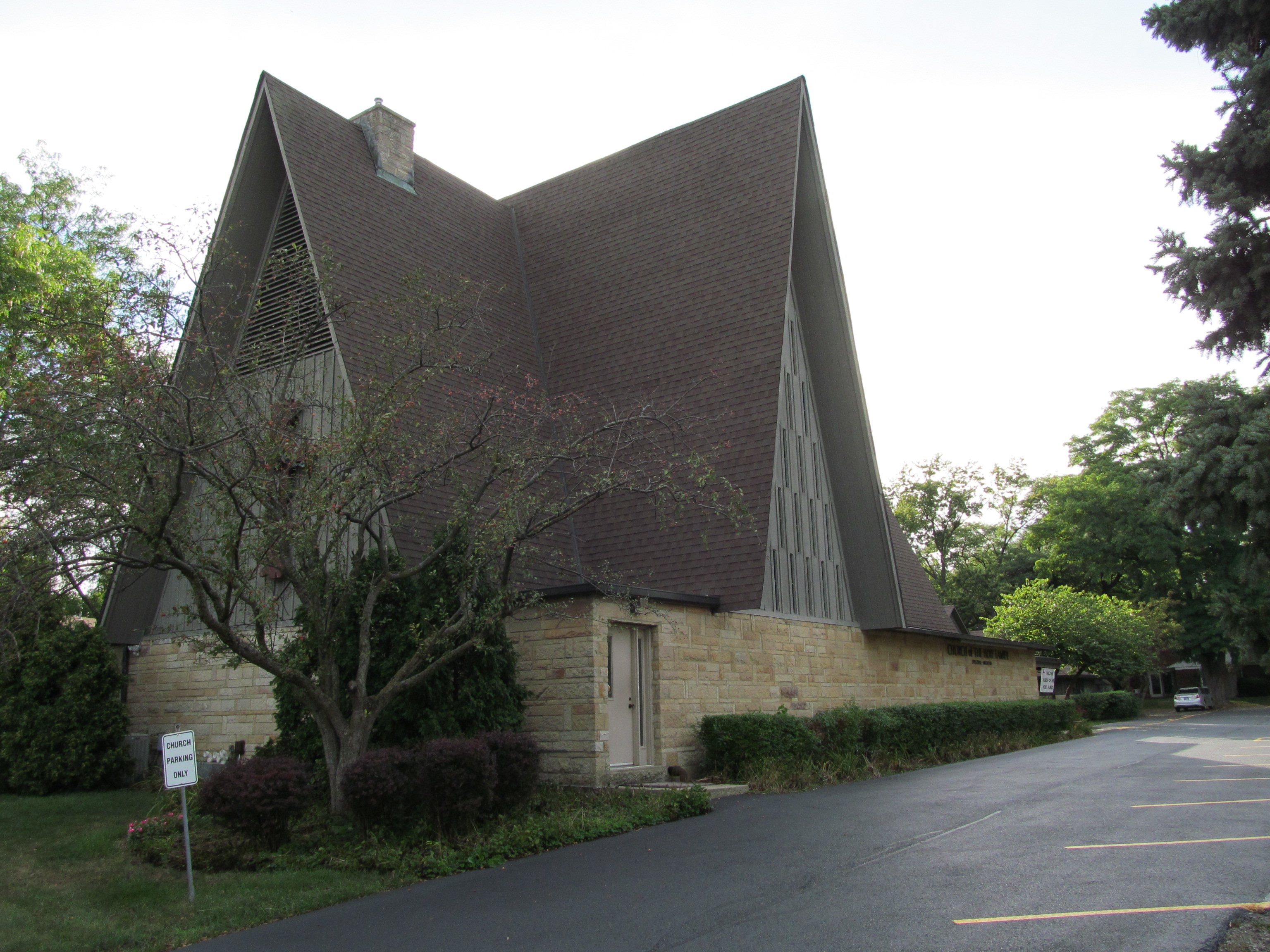
Holy Family Episcopal Church in Park Forest, Illinois
