= Norris University Center =

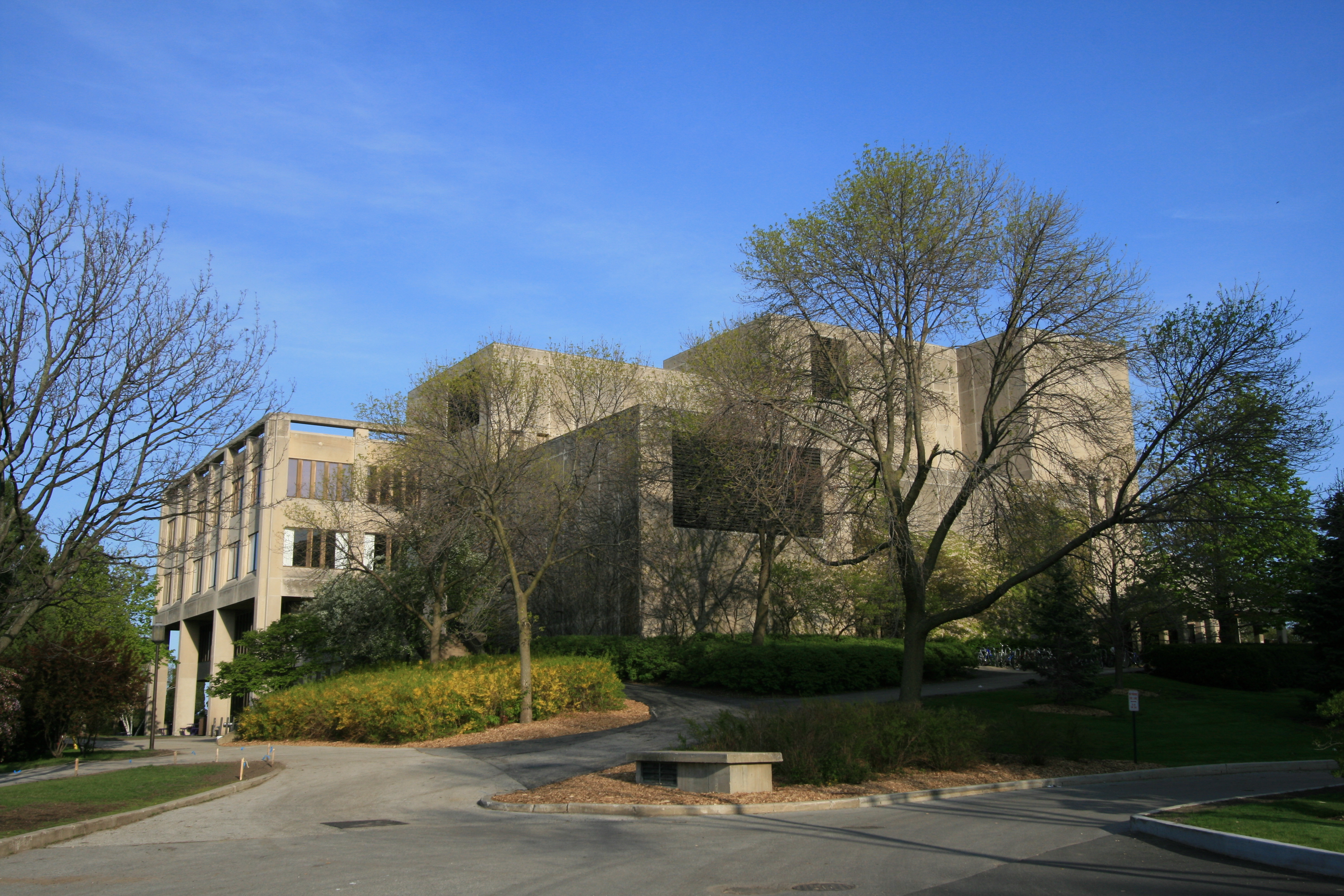

- Location within Chicago metropolitan area Norris University Center (Illinois) Norris University Center (the United States)

General information
- Type: Student union
- Architectural style: Brutalism
- Location: Evanston, IL
- Coordinates: 42°03′12.3″N 87°40′21.7″W
- Completed: 1971
- Owner: Northwestern University

Design and construction
- Architect: Edward D. Dart

References
- http://www.norris.northwestern.edu/about/mission/

The Norris University Center is the student union of Northwestern University in Evanston, Illinois, USA.

== Naming ==
The building is named for Lester J. Norris, an alumnus of Northwestern University who died in 1967. In his memory, Mr Norris's parents contributed $2.5 million toward the construction of a student center on the recently finished lakefill.

== Architecture ==
The center was designed in 1971 by Modernist architect Edward D. Dart, and has an area of approximately 150,000 square feet.

== Community center ==
The Norris University Center provides services and programs.

== Services hub ==
Norris University Center used to have a bar in it, but it was shuttered for both insurance and fire code reasons. A bar is slated to return to Norris in a renovation taking place throughout 2025.

== New Student Center Initiative ==
In 2010, a group of students began to campaign for a new student center to be built on campus, replacing the Norris University Center. The New Student Center Initiative is a student-led movement for the creation of a new student center. The initiative includes an ad hoc committee in which all Northwestern students are invited to apply, join, and contribute to the lobbying of the New Student Center. According to their proposal, the New Student Center Initiative is driven by a belief that a new, state-of-the art student center located closer to the center of campus will help create a greater sense of community throughout the University. A new building designed with this purpose in mind, they argue, would include more venue space, meeting space, centralized student services, food options and general entertainment. In addition, moving the student center to the Garret parking lot would be more of a focal point for students to congregate on campus. Those who argue the necessity of building a new student center cite the positive effect of peer institutions' larger or more comprehensive student centers.

In response to appeals from the Undergraduate Budget Priorities Committee (UBPC), the NU administration has enlisted the consulting firm Brailsford and Dunlavey to evaluate the best ways to rebuild, repurpose, or renovate the University Center to better meet students' needs. In the spring of 2012, the consultants are researching student opinion via focus groups and small meetings, which will then allow them to put together and distribute a large scale survey on the topic.
