= Joseph V. Noble =

American museum administrator

Joseph Veach Noble
- Born: April 3, 1920; Philadelphia, Pennsylvania
- Died: September 22, 2007 (aged 87); West Orange, New Jersey

Joseph V. Noble (April 3, 1920 – September 22, 2007) was an American museum administrator, antiquities collector, and self-trained ceramic archaeologist.

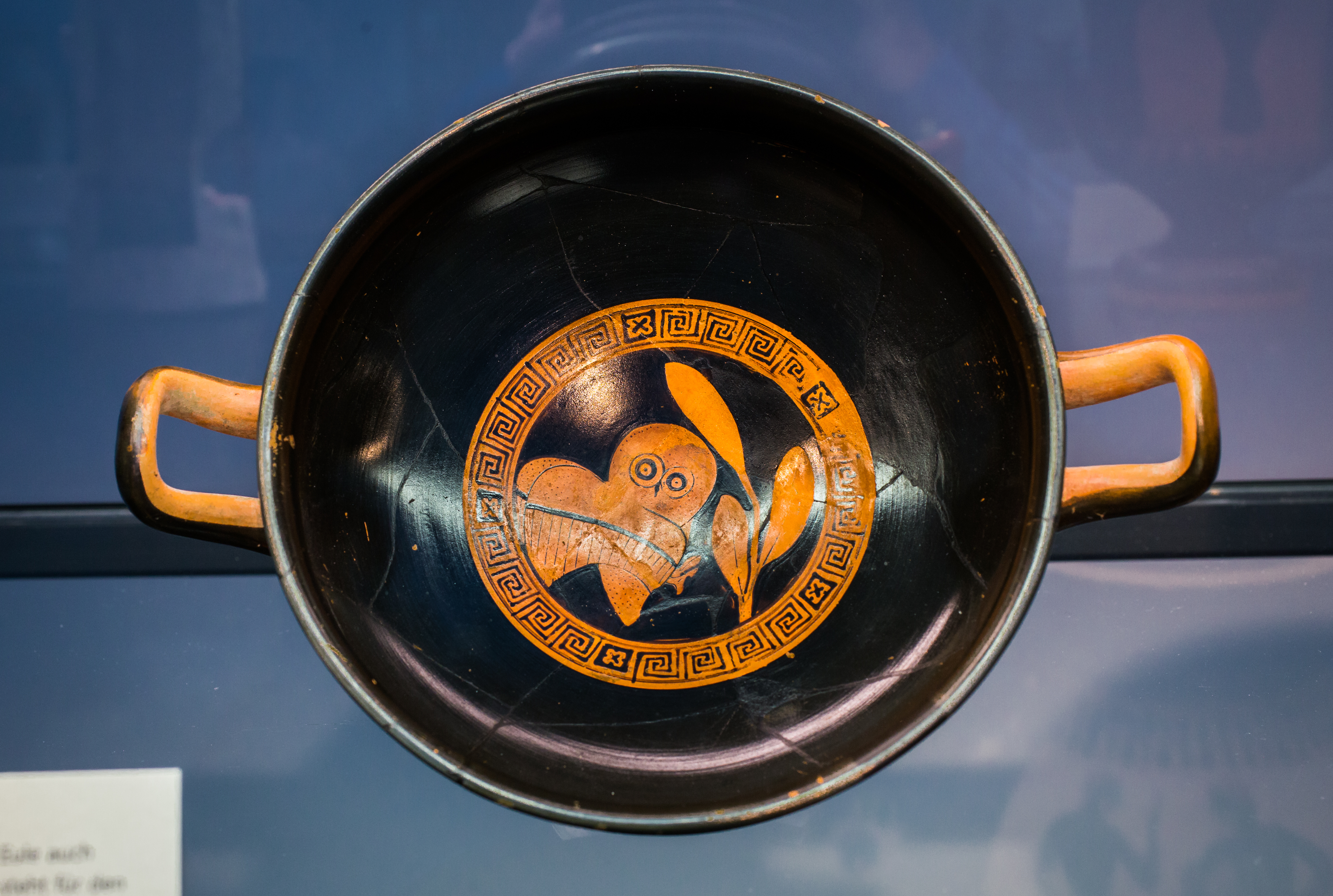
“Director Tom Hoving’s job is to pull the Museum up to the sky; it is my job to hold its feet on the ground. Between the two, we will stretch the Metropolitan Museum of Art.” (Noble, 1994).

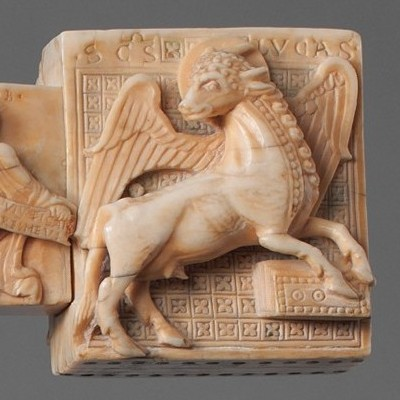
“One member of the staff stayed behind to talk to me about a highly confidential matter. This was the operating administrator Joseph V Noble, the discoverer of the crucial evidence pertaining to the Etruscan Warrior which proved the black glaze could not be ancient. He was a man I never liked or got along with.” (Hoving, 1996).

== Early life ==
Joseph Veach Noble was born on April 3, 1920, in Philadelphia, Pennsylvania. He pursued premedical studies at the University of Pennsylvania. While still in school, he began working as a cinematographer for De Frenes & Company, making documentary films. He briefly worked for Philco Corporation, one of the first television stations in Philadelphia, before enlisting in the United States Army where he served in the Signal Corps Photographic Center, attaining the position of Assistant Chief of the Camera Branch. After the war, Noble returned to De Frenes & Company for a time, then became General Manager at Murphy-Lillis, a commercial film studio. He served as Executive Vice-President at Film Counselors, Inc., from 1950 to 1956. During this time he developed an interest in and began collecting Greek vases and other antiquities.

== Career ==
In 1956, Noble was hired by Metropolitan Museum of Art Director James Rorimer to join his administrative team as Operating Administrator, a position he held until 1967. He subsequently served as Chairman of the Administrative Committee (1966-1967) and Vice-Director of Administration (1967-1970) at The Metropolitan Museum of Art. In his position as Operating Administrator, Noble oversaw curatorial and administrative functions including human resources, construction, acquisitions, and visitor services. With his 1967 promotion to Vice-Director of Administration Noble’s role changed slightly. According to a New York Times article on Thomas Hoving’s appointment as Director of the Metropolitan, Noble’s new position was “designed to direct the business of the museum and to lessen the burden of the director.” Noble, however, in a 1994 oral history interview described his change in title as “technical” and noted that his “duties were virtually the same.” He further made a positive statement about working with Hoving. Hoving later wrote that he wanted to lose Noble, but the latter's performance prevented him finding "a way to get rid of him."

As an antiquities collector and self-trained ceramic archaeologist, Noble was instrumental in exposing the three Etruscan terracotta warriors acquired by the Museum in 1916, 1917, and 1921 as modern forgeries. In 1967, he suggested that a Greek bronze horse in the Museum’s collection was also a forgery, though a 1972 panel found otherwise.

He left the Metropolitan in 1970 to become Director of the Museum of the City of New York, where he served until 1985. He also served as the President of the American Association of Museums from 1975 to 1978. In 1986, the Tampa Museum of Art acquired the Noble collection of Classical Antiquities. In 1970 sculptor Joseph Kiselewski created a brass medallion featuring Noble's profile. The medallion is in a collection housed in the American Heritage Bank in Browerville, Minnesota.

== Publications ==
- An Inquiry into the Forgery of the Etruscan Terracotta Warriors in the Metropolitan Museum of Art. Dietrich von Bothmer and Joseph Veach Noble. Papers of the Metropolitan Museum of Art No. 11. January 1, 1961.
- The Techniques of Painted Attic Pottery. Joseph Veach Noble, Metropolitan Museum of Art (New York, N.Y.) Watson-Guptill Publications, 1965.
- "The Forgery of our Greek Bronze Horse": The Metropolitan Museum of Art Bulletin, v. 26, no. 6 (February, 1968).
