= History of A & C Black's Who's Who (1901 to 1910) =

Between 1901 and 1910, ten annual editions of A & C Black's Who's Who were published.

== Who's Who, 1901 ==
The King of Illustrated Papers wrote in a review of Who's Who 1901 that "Much the same might be written of Who's Who, which has come to us in expanded form, owing to the incorporation with it of Men and Women of the Time, and the addition of many new biographies of Companions of Orders not previously inserted in this most useful book of reference. An attempt has been made in this volume for 1901 to record the relationships of people whose biographical notices are given, and we are promised that this feature will be extended in future editions. We may still find the same fault with Who's Who that we have always found - namely, that some people of importance are passed over with but a few lines of text, whereas many nobodies are treated with incongruous fulness - but the faults of the book are so few and merits so many that is hardly fair to mention even this trifling fault. The Outlook wrote "To a newspaper office this reference-book" had "become really indispensable. The title is a little flippant, but the book, in substance, is a wonderfully full and accurate compilation of personal information.

Knowledge wrote "We suppose it will always pass the wit of man to set up a standard of distinction in the preparation of a work of this kind, but the continuous growth of a miscellaneous crowd of country J.P.'s, obscure M.P.'s, and still more obscure peers, will certainly necessitate some rule on the subject, or it may become a greater distinction to be out of the book than in it. Apart from this obvious danger to the utility of the work, it may be most heartily commended for its lucid and informing character throughout, and if it should happen that one wants to know anything about anyone at any time, then the information is most likely to be contained in Who's Who. But there is such a distressingly large number of names of whom it may be safely said that few people will ever have any occasion to consult their record, to become interested in their orderly progress from the University to the Bench, or excited concerning their recreations. Still Who's Who is a great work, grateful to the journalist, and comforting to those included in its pages."

Golf Illustrated wrote "It would be idle to wish for a more accurate and comprehensive biographical directory of celebrities than the familiar red-covered Who's Who! It treats in a brief, clear, and satisfactory manner of all sorts and conditions of men and women, who, in the social, political, artistic, literary, scientific, and many other worlds, have the qualification of being either distinguished or interesting. There is, in addition, much useful information of a reference-dictionary nature such as one is constantly requiring to be primed on; and a carefully compiled index renders the task of consultation an easy one." American Ecclesiastical Review wrote that Who's Who 1901 "includes Men and Women of the Time, and is about a sixth larger than its predecessors. Its special features are the alphabetical arrangement of its tabular matter, making reference very easy; and the authoritative nature of its biographies, which are for the most part composed of the answers sent by the subject to a list of printed questions.

The disproportion between the careful volubility of the nobodies, and the reticence of many really great persons prevents the work from having any value as a means of comparative estimate, but it is a treasury of dates, lists of books written, battles fought, and discoveries made." Engineering wrote "This valuable production grows steadily in size, . . . Our sympathies go out to the Editor as we turn over the pages, for evidently he receives very little information from some to whom he would naturally desire to give much space; while sometimes from less distinguished persons he gets ampler details than the case demands. On the whole, however, the biographies are satisfactorily written. The question, which is evidently addressed to each correspondent, as to what is his recreation, often does not get answered. However we notice that one confesses to a liking for loafing, which is frank. One says he has never collected anything; we imagine he has suffered from the crazes of other collectors." The Lancet wrote "the list of names headed, The Victoria Cross is incomplete.

No names are given of either privates or of non-commissioned officers, an omission which seems to us unfair." Carrington wrote "This indispensable book . . . becomes stouter and more important-looking as its years advance . . . In addition to biographies there is much other general information, which is brought down to October 31st last."

Who's Who 1901 was also reviewed in The Spectator, the monthly Book News, The Builder and The Pilot.

== Who's Who, 1902 ==
In a review of this edition, The Literary World wrote "It covers in the main the British Empire, while introducing some American names, and many belonging to the Far East" and that this dictionary of current biography was "invaluable" and that it was a reference book "which once known it will prove hard to do without".

Who's Who 1902 was two hundred pages longer than the previous volume.

Who's Who, 1902 was also reviewed in Public Opinion, The Outlook, The Tablet, The Dial, The Lancet, and The Nation.

== Who's Who, 1903 ==
Part I, containing "the table of the Royal Family and the year's obituary", was four pages long. Part II was 1,528 pages long "with perhaps an average of twelve names on each". This constituted 1,532 pages overall and therefore Who's Who, 1903 contained more than 1,500 pages of biographies. The book includes more than 15,000 names.

In a review of this edition, The Magazine of Art wrote "The Art section is well served, especially in personages of the second rank, but more than five lines should have been accorded to Sir C. Purdon Clarke, when four times that amount is given to painters little known to the general public or even in the artistic circle.

Who's Who, 1903 was also reviewed in The Times, The School World, The Journal of Education, The Surveyor and Municipal and County Engineer, Notes and Queries, The Delineator, The Medical Press and Circular, The London Quarterly Review, The Sketch, The Dial, The Nation, Navy and Army Illustrated, The Law Times, British Medical Journal, and The Tatler.

== Who's Who, 1904 ==
The Saturday Review wrote that Who's Who 1904 is "generally accurate". The World's Paper Trade Review wrote that "it may be relied on not only as being accurate but really authoritative". The Law Magazine and Review wrote that "The accuracy of the information given shows the great care with which this work has been compiled". The Law Journal wrote that the "biographical details of judges and leading members of the profession . . . so far as we have tested them, are . . . accurate".

Who's Who 1904 was also reviewed by Notes and Queries and The Educational Times.

== Who's Who, 1905 ==
The Accountant's Magazine spoke of "the remarkable accuracy" of Who's Who, 1905. The Canada Lancet wrote that "The book contains a vast amount of reliable information regarding persons of note throughout the British Empire". The Law Journal wrote that the "biographical details of judges and leading lawyers . . . so far as we have tested them, are accurate".

Who's Who 1905 was also reviewed by Notes and Queries and The Pharmaceutical Journal.

== Who's Who, 1906 ==
Engineering wrote that Who's Who, 1906 gave "accurate information regarding the career of men whose names are frequently before the public in an official or other capacity". Notes and Queries wrote that "For those engaged in literary and journalistic pursuits, Who's Who remains the most trustworthy . . . work of personal reference". The Library World wrote that "its accuracy is well maintained".

Who's Who, 1906 was also reviewed in The Naturalist.

== Who's Who, 1907 ==
Who's Who, 1907 includes more than 21,000 biographies.

The Congregationalist and Christian World wrote that Who's Who, 1907 "comes promptly to aid journalists and others who wish to consult . . . accurate biographies of the leading personages in the Western political and literary world, Britons of course predominating." The Standard called it "a monument of painstaking care". Page's Weekly wrote that "we have subjected Who's Who to several tests and are glad to find that the accuracy which pervades the subject matter is again worthy of high commendation". Medical Record wrote that "The data about Americans mentioned in the work appear to be in the main correct, though we notice that the name of the late Albert Bierstadt, the artist, is retained in the book as though he were still living." The United Service Magazine wrote that "Immense pains are taken to ensure accuracy".

Who's Who 1907 was also reviewed by Notes and Queries.

== Who's Who, 1908 ==
The Dublin Journal of Medical Science wrote that the biographies in Who's Who, 1908 "may be considered to be accurate". The Electrical Review wrote that "the details may generally be regarded as accurate". Page's Weekly added that "We have many occasions had reason to admire the accuracy which is attained by the Editor of Who's Who".

== Who's Who, 1909 ==
Country Life wrote that Who's Who, 1909 was "of most praiseworthy accuracy". The Scots Law Times wrote that "The information given about the persons named may be taken as reliable". The Empire Review and Magazine wrote "the great pains taken to ensure accuracy gives to the volume additional value". The American Review of Reviews wrote that it "continues . . . to sustain its high level of accuracy".

Who's Who, 1909 was also reviewed by The Burlington Magazine for Connoisseurs and The Electrician.

== Who's Who, 1910 ==
The book contained about 23,000 biographies.

Knowledge & Scientific News wrote that Who's Who, 1910 "is kept up-to-date and accurate". The Railway News wrote that "The information is brought thoroughly up to date". Country Life wrote that "This year it appears to be as accurate . . . as usual." Page's Weekly wrote that "Who's Who has a notable reputation to maintain and it is not surprising to find, therefore, that exceptional care is taken to render it a reference work of unimpeachable accuracy."

Who's Who, 1910 was also reviewed by The Expository Times and The Burlington Magazine for Connoisseurs.
