= List of directors of the Metropolitan Museum of Art =

Director of Metropolitan Museum of Art
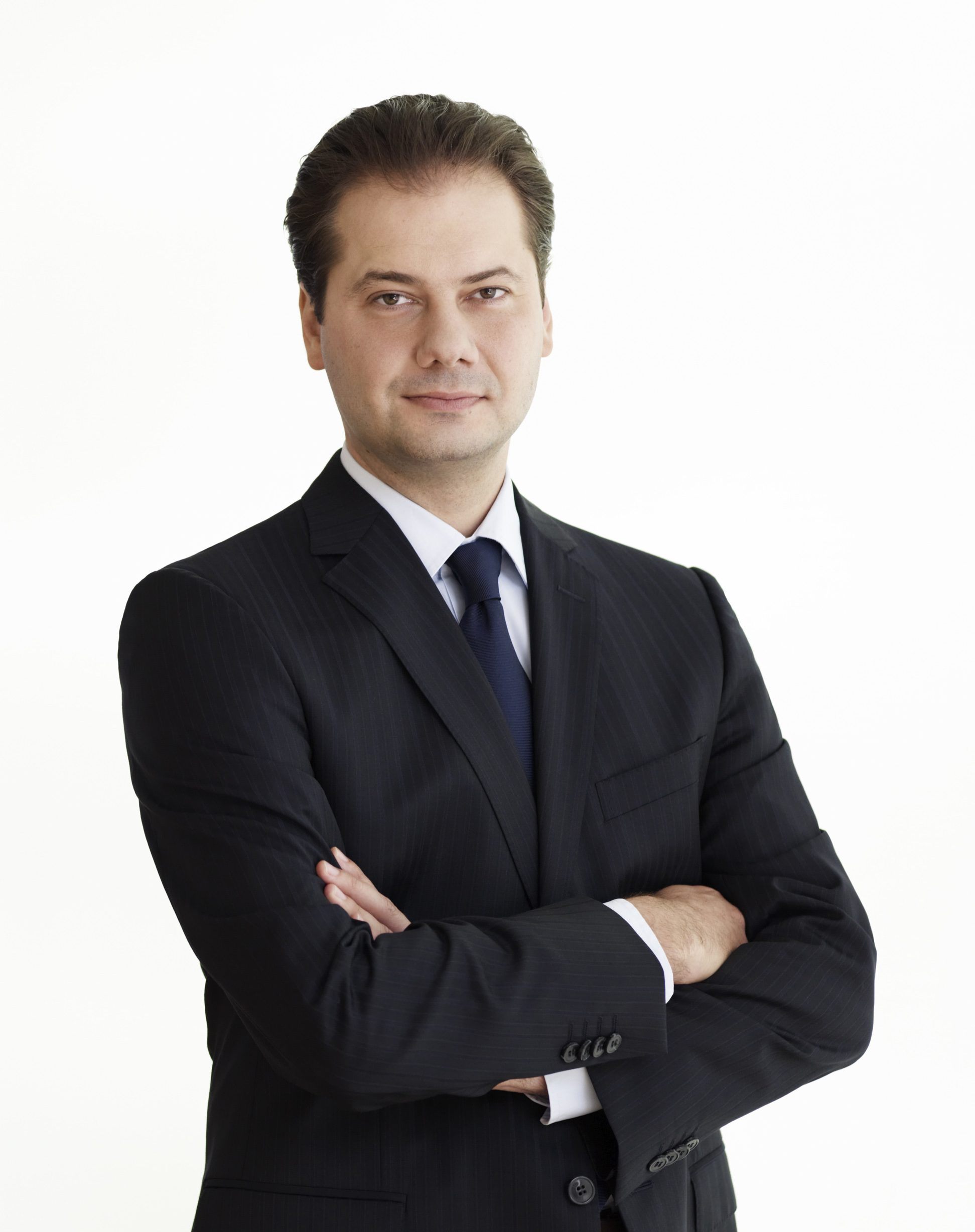
- Incumbent; Max Hollein since 2018
- Reports to: President of the Metropolitan Museum of Art
- Formation: 1879
- First holder: Luigi Palma di Cesnola
- Salary: $2,690,207 (2017)

The Director of the Metropolitan Museum of Art is the director of the museum. The Metropolitan Museum of Art of New York City, colloquially "the Met", is the largest art museum in the United States. With 6,953,927 visitors to its three locations in 2018, it was the third most visited art museum in the world. Its permanent collection contains over two million works, divided among seventeen curatorial departments. The director, currently Max Hollein, is responsible for acting as a "curator, lawyer and diplomat", according to The Wall Street Journal. They produce around 40 exhibits at the museum a year, manage the museums' approximately 2,200 employees, and oversee the collection and curatorial departments.

The Director currently reports to Daniel H. Weiss, President and CEO of the Museum. The director typically has had a large degree of autonomy in operation, with Philippe de Montebello refusing to report to then president and CEO William Macomber in 1977. It has generally been the highest-ranking official in the museum's leadership, with the director serving as president. On June 13, 2017, the Met announced the reestablishment of a separate museum president, higher than the director.

Past directors have historically been prominent figures in the art world. Past directors include: United States consul at Larnaca in Cyprus and Medal of Honor recipient Luigi Palma di Cesnola, Director of the Victoria and Albert Museum Sir Caspar Purdon Clarke, secretary of the Art Commission of Boston and director of the Boston Museum of Fine Arts Edward Robinson, Parks Commissioner of New York City Thomas Hoving, and director of the Fine Arts Museums of San Francisco Max Hollein.

== List ==
No.	Image	Name	Term	Note(s)
1		Luigi Palma di Cesnola	1879 to 1904	United States consul at Larnaca in Cyprus and Medal of Honor recipient during the American Civil War. As consul in Cyprus, he carried out excavations, which resulted in the discovery of a large number of antiquities, an approximately 30,000 item collection. The collection was purchased by the newly expanded Metropolitan Museum of Art in New York in 1872, and Cesnola became the first director in 1879, until his death in 1904. Survived several attempts to remove him from office.
2		Caspar Purdon Clarke	1904 to 1910	Director of the Victoria and Albert Museum, hired by then president of the Met, J. P. Morgan. Resigned due to ill health in 1910.
3		Edward Robinson	1910 to 1931	He lectured on archaeology at Harvard in 1893-94 and in 1898–1902, and was secretary of the Art commission of Boston in 1890–98. From 1895 to 1902, he was curator of classical antiquities in the Boston Museum of Fine Arts, and beginning in 1902 was director of the museum for three years. He became assistant director of the Metropolitan Museum of Art in New York in 1906, and succeeded Sir Caspar Purdon Clarke as director in 1910.
4	–	Herbert Eustis Winlock	1932 to 1939	American Egyptologist employed with the Metropolitan Museum of Art during his entire Egyptological career. He is credited with "revitalizing" the museum during his tenure as director.
5	–	Francis Henry Taylor	1940 to 1955	Began career as a curator at the Philadelphia Museum of Art. In 1931 he became director of the Worcester Art Museum Massachusetts, before joining the Metropolitan Museum in New York City as its director in 1940. Opened over 100 galleries and is credited with doubling the number of people visiting the museum, up to 2.3 million a year.
6		James Rorimer	1955 to 1966	A founder of the Cloisters, a branch of the museum dedicated to the art and architecture of Medieval Europe. During World War II, Rorimer served in the U.S. Army's Monuments, Fine Arts and Archives Section, protecting cultural sites and recovering stolen art work. Oversaw as director a period of general expansion despite disagreements with trustees and museum staff, and attendance at the museum tripled from 2 million to 6 million visitors annually.
7		Thomas Hoving	1967 to 1977	Worked for the Met, briefly as curator of the Cloisters, before serving as Parks Commissioner of New York City from 1966 to 1967. Assumed the directorship on March 17, 1967, and presided over a massive expansion and renovation of the museum, successfully adding many important collections to its holdings.
8	–	Philippe de Montebello	1977 to 2008	Worked in the Met, served as Director of the Museum of Fine Arts in Houston, Texas from 1969 to 1974. The longest-serving director in the institution's history, and the third longest-serving director of any major art museum in the world. Oversaw a near doubling of the museum's square footage. The museum grew into the largest tourist attraction in New York City by the time of his departure.
9	–	Thomas P. Campbell	2009 to 2017	Co-founder of the Franses Tapestry Archive in 1987. Worked in the Met, at the Department of European Sculpture and Decorative Arts, becoming curator in 2003. As director saw the Met's highest attendance in 40 years, in 2011, with 6.28 million visits. During that year, the museum also opened extensive new galleries for both its Islamic and American art and launched a redesigned website that now attracts more than 44 million visits per year. The Met Breuer was opened in 2015.
Interim		Daniel Weiss	2017 to 2018	President of Lafayette College from 2005 to 2013, and Haverford College from 2013 to 2015. Interim president after Campbell resigned from directorship. Current president and CEO of the museum.
10		Max Hollein	2018	Began career at the Solomon R. Guggenheim Museum; served as director of the Schirn Kunsthalle Frankfurt, Liebieghaus, and Städel Museum in Frankfurt; then as Director and CEO of the Fine Arts Museums of San Francisco from July 2016 to 2018.

== See also ==
- List of presidents of the Metropolitan Museum of Art
