= Edward Robinson (curator) =

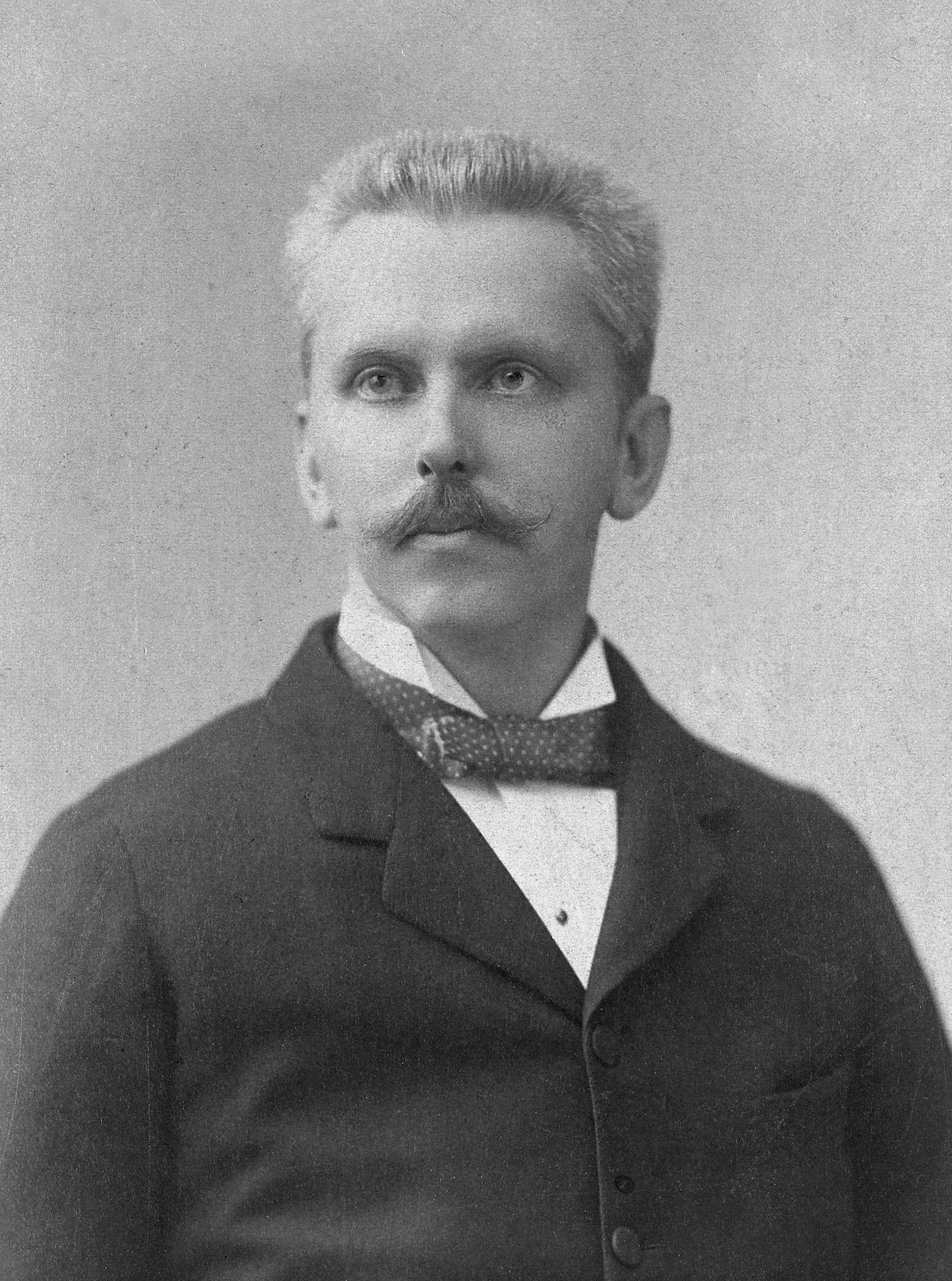
- Robinson ca. 1895 (photograph by George Hastings, Boston)
- Born: November 1, 1858; Boston
- Died: April 18, 1931 (aged 72)

Edward Robinson (November 1, 1858, Boston – April 18, 1931, New York City) was an American writer and authority on art.

== Biography ==
Robinson graduated from Harvard in 1879, and spent the following five years in study, especially in Greece (15 months) and in Berlin (3 semesters), devoting his attention chiefly to archaeology.

From 1895 to 1902, Robinson was curator of classical antiquities in the Boston Museum of Fine Arts, and beginning in 1902 was director of the museum for three years. He became assistant director of the Metropolitan Museum of Art in New York in 1906, and succeeded Sir Caspar Purdon Clarke in 1910, becoming the third director of "the Met", a position he held for 21 years. He lectured on archaeology at Harvard in 1893–1894 and in 1898–1902, and was secretary of the Art commission of Boston during 1890–1898. He prepared catalogues and contributed many articles on art and archaeological subjects for magazines. He was a member of many learned societies.

Cultural offices
Preceded by Caspar Purdon Clarke	Director of the Metropolitan Museum of Art; 1910–1931	Succeeded by Herbert Eustis Winlock
