= Etruscan terracotta warriors =

Forged statues

- Material: Terracotta
- Size: 202cm

The Etruscan terracotta warriors are three statues that resemble the work of the ancient Etruscans, but are in fact art forgeries. The statues, created by Italian brothers Pio and Alfonso Riccardi and three of their six sons, were bought by The Metropolitan Museum of Art between 1915 and 1921.

== Early fakes ==
The Riccardis began their career as art forgers when Roman art dealer Domenico Fuschini hired them to forge shards of ancient ceramics and eventually whole jars.

Their first sizeable work was a large bronze chariot. In 1908, Fuschini informed the British Museum that the chariot had been found in the old Etruscan fort near Orvieto, and that the Riccardis had been commissioned to clean it. The British Museum bought the chariot and published the find in 1912. Pio Riccardi died soon after the purchase.

== Warriors ==
The Riccardis enlisted the aid of sculptor Alfredo Fioravanti and created a statue, later known as the Old Warrior. It was 202 cm (6.6 ft) tall and was naked from the waist down. It was also missing its left thumb and right arm. In 1915, they sold it to the Metropolitan Museum of Art that also bought their next work, the Colossal Head, in 1916. Experts decided it must have been part of a seven-metre (23-foot) statue.

The next work was designed by Pio's eldest son Ricardo, who died in a riding accident before it was completed. When finished, the statue stood a little over two metres (6.6 ft) tall. In 1918, the Metropolitan Museum of Art bought it for $40,000 and published the find as the Big Warrior in 1921. The forgers subsequently dispersed.

== Discovery of forgery ==
The three warrior statues were first exhibited together in 1933. In the following years, various art historians, especially in Italy, presented their suspicions that on stylistic and artistic grounds alone, the statues might be forgeries, but there was no forensic proof to support the allegations. A later expert found that these exceptionally large pieces showed extraordinarily even firing characteristics, but he expressed this as cause for admiration, not suspicion. In 1960, chemical tests of the statue glazes showed the presence of manganese, an ingredient that Etruscans had never used. The museum was not convinced until experts deduced how they had been made. The statues had been sculpted, painted with glaze, then toppled while in an unfired, green state to produce fragments. Metropolitan director James Rorimer stated that studies by the museum's Operating Administrator Joseph V. Noble (an antiquities collector and self-trained ceramic archaeologist) "provided the first technical evidence of their having been made in modern times." This was confirmed by Alfredo Fioravanti, who on January 5, 1961, entered the US consulate in Rome and signed a confession. The forgers had lacked the skills – and the very large kiln – required to make such large pieces. The fragments had been fired, "discovered" and sold, or re-assembled ("restored") then sold. As proof, Fioravanti presented the Old Warrior's missing thumb, which he had kept as a memento. On February 15, the Metropolitan Museum announced that the statues were forgeries.

== See also ==
- Craddock, Paul (2009). Scientific Investigation of Copies, Fakes and Forgeries. Butterworth-Heinemann. pp. 197–199.
