= Bilingual kylix by the Andokides painter =

Ancient Greek vase

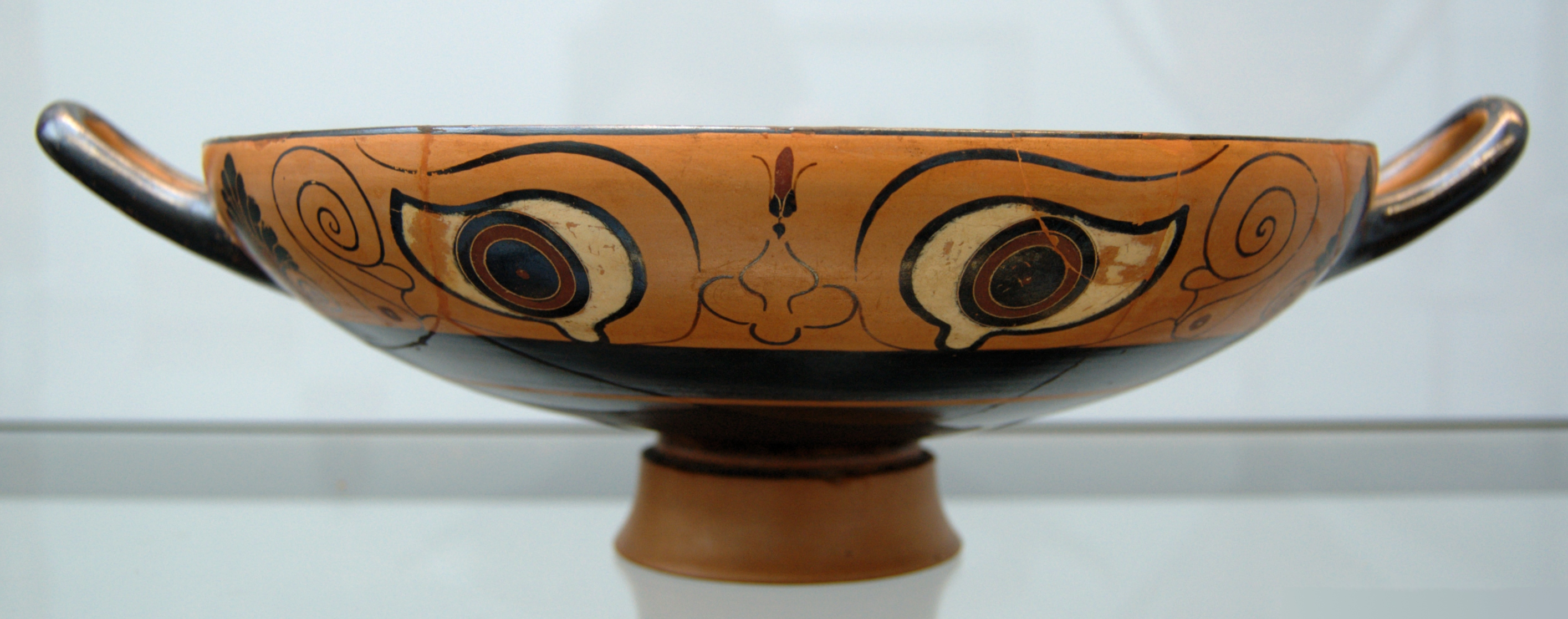
A different example of the eye-cup shape. Chalkidian black-figure eye-cup, circa 530 BC

The bilingual eye-cup by the Andokides painter in the Museo Archeologico Regionale, Palermo (not illustrated), is a prime example of the transition from black-figure vase painting to the red-figure style in the late 6th century to early 5th century BC that commonly resulted in "bilingual" vases, using both styles. The Andokides painter created the red-figure style of pottery as we know it today during his working years from 530 to 515 BC. Starting around 530 BC the Andokides painter produced red-figure amphorae and a bilingual kylix. Fewer than 20 vases survive by the Andokides painter but they span 30–40 years of his career, allowing historians to trace the development of his painting styles. One of the earliest mentions of the Andokides painter was on a black-figure hydria by Timagoras around 550 BC, when the Andokides painter must have been an apprentice.

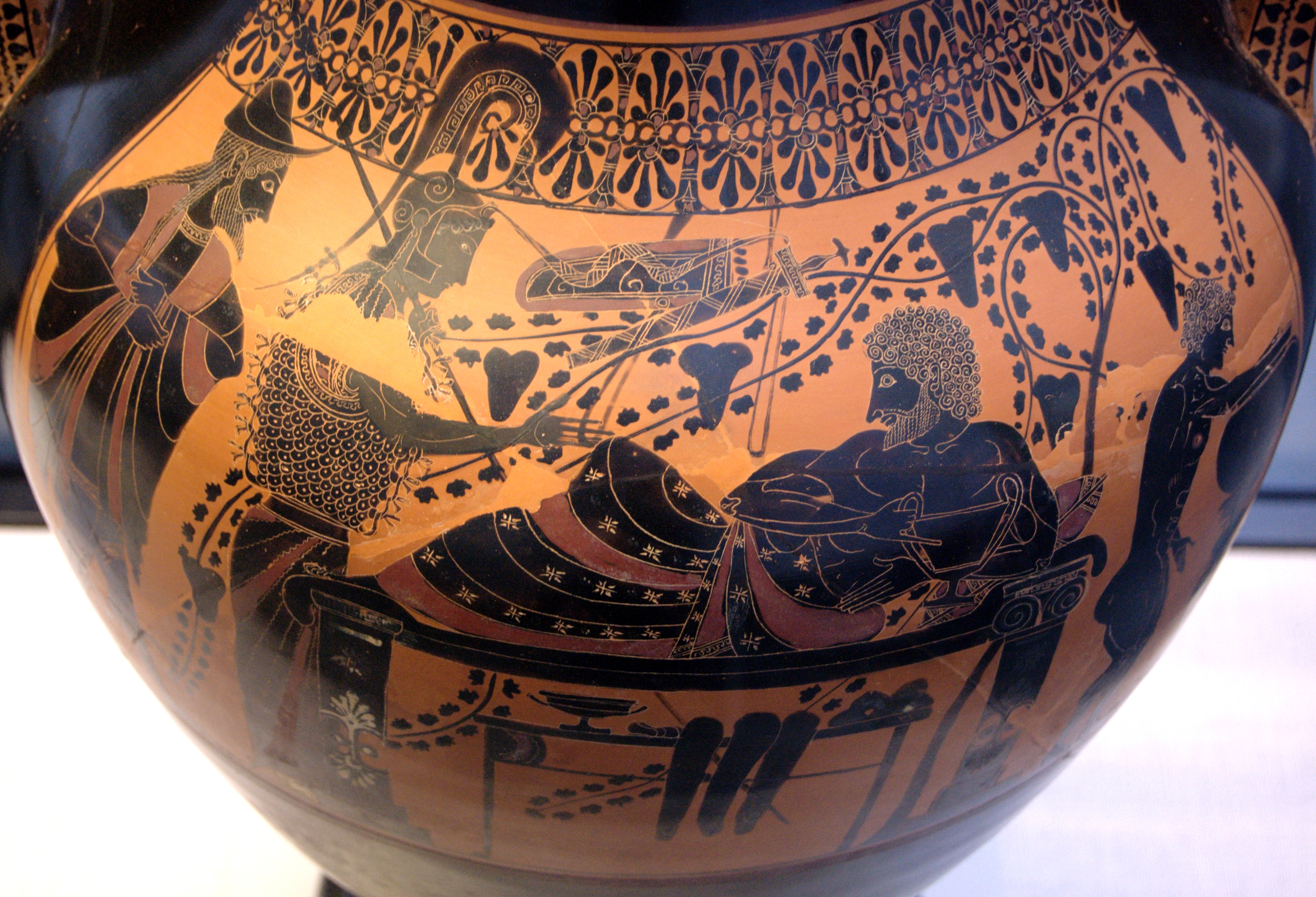
A bilingual amphora by the Andokides Painter; Munich, Antikensammlungen 2301

== Red-figure technique ==
The red-figure technique was likely perfected, if not created, by the Andokides painter. This revolutionary technique made the compositions stand out more so they were easier to see from a distance. It essentially used the same materials as the black-figure, but reversed the way the image figures were created. Instead of using incision and added light colors to define figures, figures were left with light glaze then defined with black lines while the background was filled in black. This contrast of light on dark made the composition stand out as opposed to the dark, shadowy figures on a black-figure composition. This created a need, however, for even more decorations along the top, bottom, and sides of the main register in order to delineate the black of the vase from the black background of the figural scene.

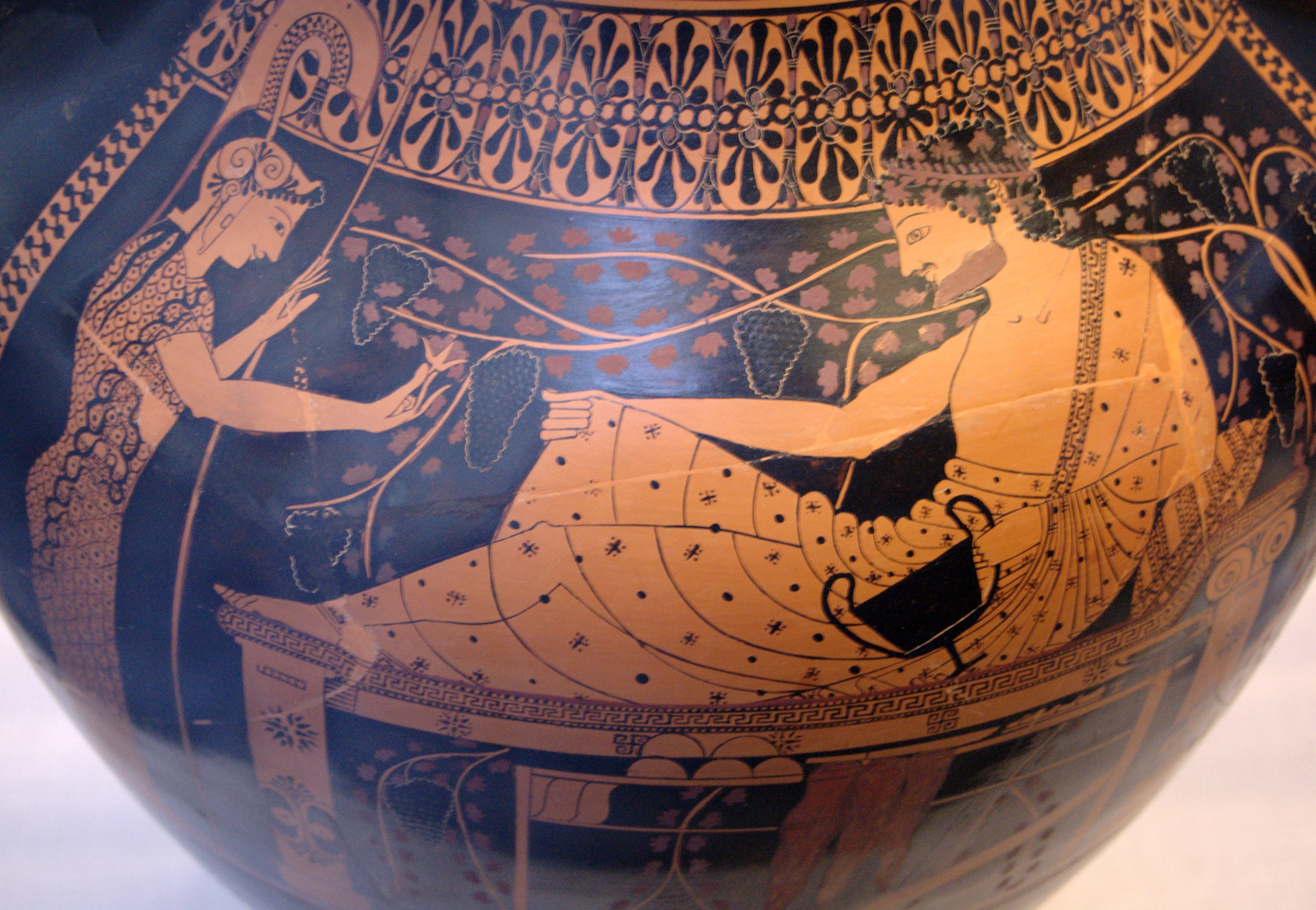
Red figure side of Munich, Antikensammlungen 2301

The introduction of the red-figure technique can be related back to the Siphnian Treasury at Delphi. The style of the Andokides painter is remarkably similar to the sculptural decorations on the treasury. This similarity can be traced through the particular details in armory and human anatomy, the use of drapery lines, and also through the subject of the struggle for the Delphic tripod. According to Dietrich von Bothmer of the Metropolitan Museum of Art, only the Andokides painter has been known to emphasize calf muscles with three curved lines as is also seen on the frieze of the Siphnian Treasury. This relation shows that the Andokides painter was inspired by the sculptural decorations on the treasury and incorporated aspects of that into his own works.

== Bilingual eye cup ==
The only bilingual kylix eye cup by the Andokides painter dates to ca. 530 BC. The figures on this kylix are of warriors around the handles, archers between the eyes on the red-figure register, and a trumpeter between the eyes on the black-figure register; most of the tondo is lost but what fragments remain are just of ray patterns. The composition is simple enough, but the unique aspect of this kylix comes in the specifics dividing the painting techniques. Scholars generally attribute the black-figure compositions of the Andokides painter's vases to the Lysippides Painter. On this bilingual eye cup the demarcation between red-figure and black-figure is so specific that both of the black-figure warriors who are in supplication on the ground have red-figure shields that have fallen out of their hands.

== Elite soldiers ==
The hoplite warriors depicted in the bilingual kylix were Greek warriors who fought in closed ranks, or a phalanx. Hoplites were the most common type of soldier in the 7th through 4th centuries BC. These soldiers carried long thrusting spears (doru) in their right hands and shields in their left with a short sword (xiphos) on the hip. The shields would protect the soldier's own body and the right side of the warrior to his left. This set-up of soldiers allowed all but the ones on the ends of rows to be fully protected during battle. The phalanx formation didn't allow for much movement but the Greeks were the best warriors around regardless of any mobility issues.
