= Francis Henry Taylor =

American museum director and curator

- Born: 1903; Philadelphia, Pennsylvania, United States
- Died: November 23, 1957 (aged 53–54); Worcester, Massachusetts, United States
- Occupation: Director of the Metropolitan Museum of Art

Francis Henry Taylor (1903–1957) was a distinguished American museum director and curator, who served as the director of the Metropolitan Museum of Art for fifteen years.

== Biography ==
He was born in Philadelphia, and started his career as a curator at the Philadelphia Museum of Art. In 1931 he became director of the Worcester Art Museum Massachusetts, before joining the Metropolitan Museum in New York City as its director in 1940.

Taylor was elected to the American Academy of Arts and Sciences in 1939 and the American Philosophical Society in 1946.

Sometimes described as a showman, he developed a theory of the museum as an institution of active public service, not simply a repository of art. He was credited with doubling the number of people visiting the museum, up to 2.3 million a year.

== Death ==
Taylor died at the Memorial Hospital in Worcester, Massachusetts on November 23, 1957.

== Books ==
His writings include:

- Babel's Tower: The Dilemma of the Modern Museum (1945)
- The Taste of Angels: A History of Art Collecting from Rameses to Napoleon (1948, reprint 1955) - ASIN B0007HX8Y6
- Fifty Centuries of Art (1954)
- Pierpont Morgan as Collector and Patron, 1837-1913 (1957), Pierpont Morgan Library - ASIN B0007DVP6I

== See also ==
- Monuments, Fine Arts, and Archives program

Cultural offices
Preceded by Herbert Winlock	Director of the Metropolitan Museum of Art; 1940–1955	Succeeded by James Rorimer
