= Dietrich von Bothmer =

German-born American art historian

- Born: Dietrich Felix von Bothmer; October 26, 1918; Eisenach, Germany
- Died: 12 October 2009 (aged 90); Manhattan, New York, United States
- Spouse: Joyce de La Bégassière (née Blaffer)

Academic background
- Education: Humboldt University of Berlin; Wadham College, Oxford; University of California, Berkeley

Academic work
- Discipline: Art history
- Sub-discipline: Ancient Greek pottery
- Institutions: Metropolitan Museum of Art; Institute of Fine Arts, New York University
- Military career
- Allegiance: United States
- Branch: United States Army
- Service years: 1943–1946
- Conflicts: World War II: Pacific War
- Awards: Bronze Star Medal; Purple Heart

Dietrich Felix von Bothmer (pronounced BOAT-mare; October 26, 1918 – October 12, 2009) was a German-born American art historian, who spent six decades as a curator at the Metropolitan Museum of Art, where he developed into the world's leading specialist in the field of ancient Greek vases.

== Early life and education ==
Bothmer was born in Eisenach, Germany on October 26, 1918. An ardent opponent of the Nazi dictatorship, he attended Berlin's Friedrich Wilhelms University and then Wadham College, Oxford in 1938 on the final Rhodes Scholarship awarded in Germany. There he worked with Sir John Beazley on his books Attic Red-Figure Vase-Painters and Attic Black-Figure Vase-Painters, working collaboratively to group works by identifying the individual craftsmen and workshops that had created each of hundreds of Greek vases. He graduated in 1939 with a major in classical archaeology.

A tour of museums in the United States in 1939 left Bothmer stuck there with the start of World War II. Due to his strong anti-Nazi sentiments, he refused to return to Germany, and narrowly escaped being sent back to Germany against his will. He earned his doctorate at the University of California, Berkeley in 1944. Though not yet a citizen, in 1943 he volunteered for the United States Army. After 90 days in the U.S. Army, he was sworn in as a U.S. citizen in March, 1944. He served in the Pacific theater of operations, earning a Bronze Star Medal and Purple Heart for a conspicuous act of bravery on August 11, 1944, while serving in the South Pacific, where, despite being wounded himself in the thigh, foot, and arm, he recovered a wounded comrade and carried him back three miles through enemy lines.

== Career ==
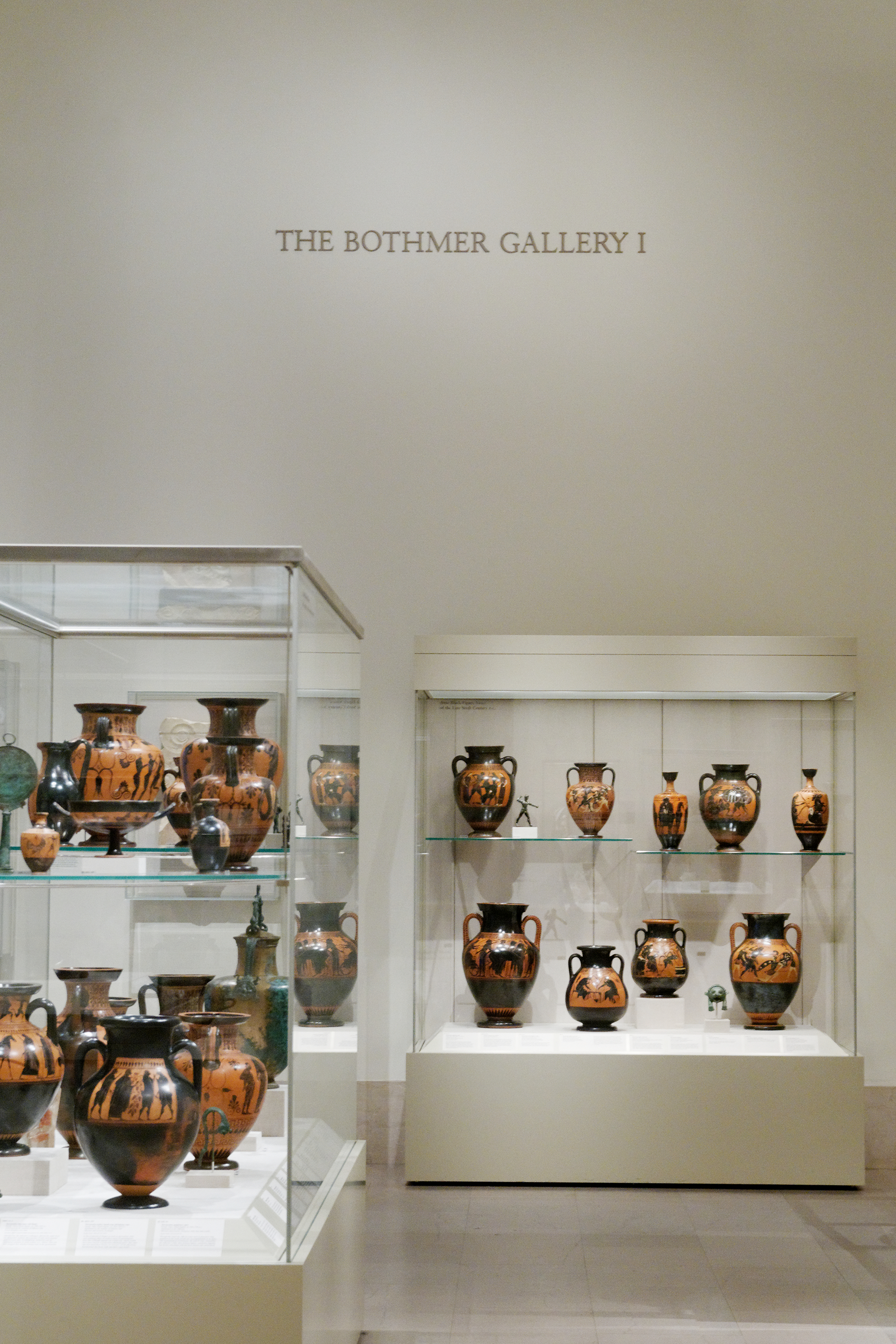
A room of the Bothmer Gallery in the Metropolitan Museum of Art

Following the completion of his military service, Bothmer was hired by the Metropolitan Museum of Art in 1946, and was named as a curator in 1959. By 1973, he was department chairman and he was named in 1990 as distinguished research curator.

In 1972, together with the Director, Thomas Hoving, Bothmer argued in favor of the purchase of the Euphronios Krater, a vase used to mix wine with water that dated from the sixth century BCE. They convinced the museum's board to purchase the artifact for $1 million, which the museum funded through the sale of its coin collection. The Government of Italy demanded the object's return, citing claims that the vase had been taken illegally from an ancient Etruscan site near Rome. The krater was one of 20 pieces that the museum sent back to Italy in 2008 in exchange for multi-year loans of ancient artifacts that were put on display at the Met, as part of an agreement reached in 2006.

Bothmer's 1977 exhibit "Thracian Treasures from Bulgaria" covered twenty centuries of Thracian culture, with more than 500 art works dating back to the Copper Age. The 1979 show "Greek Art of the Aegean Islands" included 191 pieces, of which 46 came from the Met and a similar number from the Louvre. The remainder came from several different museums in Greece, including the largest known Cycladic sculpture, dating to 2700 to 2300 BCE, on loan from the National Archaeological Museum, Athens. A 1985 exhibition based on his research, "The Amasis Painter and his World: Vase Painting in Sixth Century B.C. Athens," included 65 works of a single artist who created his pottery 2,500 years before, the first to document the history of the work of a single craftsman from that ancient period as a one-man show.

Bothmer's numerous published works in the field include the 1957 Amazons in Greek Art, Ancient Art From New York Private Collections and An Inquiry Into the Forgery of the Etruscan Terracotta Warriors in the Metropolitan Museum of Art (with Joseph V. Noble), both published in 1961, Greek Vase Painting: an Introduction in 1972, his 1985 book The Amasis Painter and His World: Vase-Painting in Sixth-Century B.C. Athens, his 1991 book Glories of the Past: Ancient Art from the Shelby White and Leon Levy Collection, and in 1992, Euphronios, peintre: Actes de la journee d'etude organisee par l'Ecole du Louvre et le Departement des antiquites grecques, etrusques de l'Ecole du Louvre (French Edition). He also contributed in 1983 to Wealth of the Ancient World (Hunt Art Collections), Development of the Attic Black-Figure, Revised Edition (Sather Classical Lectures) in 1986, and a wide variety of other publications.

Bothmer took a faculty position in 1965 at the Institute of Fine Arts, the nation's top-ranked graduate program in art history, according to the National Research Council's 1994 study.

Bothmer spoke and wrote seven languages: German; English; French; Italian; Latin; and Modern and Ancient Greek.

== Awards and citations ==
Bothmer was a Chevalier de la Légion d'honneur, the French order established in 1802. It is the highest decoration in France.

Bothmer was elected in 1988 to the Institute de France, the French learned society founded in 1795. He was a member of its Academie des Inscriptions et Belles-Lettres. Only two Americans can be in it at any one time.

Bothmer was elected a member of The Académie française (one of only two Americans to have this honor) as an Associé (only French citizens can be Academicians), in 1997. The Académie comprises forty members, known as les immortels ("the immortals"). New members are elected by the members of the Académie itself. The Académie Française, also known as the French Academy, is the principal French council for matters pertaining to the French language. The Académie was officially established in 1635 by Cardinal Richelieu, the chief minister to King Louis XIII.

He was also an honorary fellow of Wadham College, and the recipient of several honorary doctorates.

Complementing his career as a curator and an academic, he served on the Art Advisory Council of the International Foundation for Art Research.

== Major publications ==
Attic Black-figured Pelikai 1951

Amazons in Greek Art 1957

Greek Vases from the Hearst Collection 1957

Ancient Art From New York Private Collections: Catalogue of an Exhibition Held at the Metropolitan Museum of Art December 17, 1959-February 28, 1960 1961

An Inquiry Into the Forgery of the Etruscan Terracotta Warriors in the Metropolitan Museum of Art 1961

Andokides the Potter and the Andokides Painter 1966

Corpus Vasorum Antiquorum: Attic Black-Figured Neck-Amphorae 1976

Thracian: Treasures from Bulgaria 1977

Greek Art of the Aegean Islands 1979

The Search for Alexander: Supplement to the Catalogue 1983

The Amasis Painter and His World: Vase-Painting in Sixth-Century B.C. Athens 1986

Greek Vase Painting 1987

Wealth of the Ancient World: Nelson Bunker Hunt and William Herbert Hunt Collections 1987

Glories of the Past: Ancient Art from the Shelby White and Leon Levy Collection 1990

== Books related to ==
The Lost Chalice: The Epic Hunt for a Priceless Masterpiece, by Vernon Silver

Making the Mummies Dance: Inside the Metropolitan Museum of Art, by Thomas Hoving

The Sarpedon Krater: The Life and Afterlife of a Greek Vase, by Nigel Spivey

Bernard V. Bothmer, Egyptologist in the Making, 1912 Through July 1946: With Bothmer's Own Account of His Escape from Central Europe in October 1941 (Investigatio Orientis), by Marianne Eaton-Krauss

Essays in Honor of Dietrich von Bothmer. Two volumes: Text & Plates. Allard Pierson Series Volume 14, by Andrew J. Clark and Jasper Gaunt, eds.

=== Artifact origin controversy ===
Law enforcement and some archaeologists now believe that several of von Bothmer's many acquisitions of pottery fragments had illicit origins. Pieces of an Attic kylix were acquired over a 16-year period from a series of buyers, with some fragments acquired from Bothmer that completed the piece and allowed it to be fully reassembled. Prosecutors cite the improbability of being able to collect so many shards from the same artifact from disparate sources, and the fact that von Bothmer personally knew the seller of each shard of pottery that was later combined to restore the Kylix.

== List of publications ==
1941

“Greek Pottery from Tell en-Nasbeh,” Bulletin of the American School of Oriental Research 83 (1941) 25-30.

1944

Amazons in Greek Art, Ph.D. dissertation, University of California, Berkeley, 1944.

“The Painters of ‘Tyrrhenian’ Vases,” AJA 48 (1944) 161-70.

1946

Review of H. Bloesch, Antike Kunst in der Schweiz; Fünfzig Meisterwerke aus dem klassischen Altertum in öffentlichem und privatem Besitz (Erlenbach-Zürich 1943), in AJA 50 (1946) 495-97.

1947

“Greek Pottery,” in C.C. McCown ed., Tell en-Nasbeh; Excavated under the Direction of the late William Frederic Badé (Berkeley 1947) 175-78, 304.

“An Amphora of the Polyphemus Group,” BMMA 5 no. 5 (January 1947) 131-35.

“The Taleides Amphora,” BMMA 5 no. 9 (May 1947) 221-26 (with “Notes on the Inscriptions” by M.J. Milne, 226-28).

1948

“An Attic Black-figured Dinos,” BMFA 46 no. 264 (June 1948) 42-48.

1949

“The Classical Contribution to Western Civilization,” BMMA 7 no. 8 (April 1949) 205-19.

“Recent Accessions of Greek Terracotta Vases,” BMMA 8 no. 3 (November 1949) 91-96.

“The Arming of Achilles,” BMFA 47 no. 270 (December 1949) 84-90.

1950

Greek, Etruscan and Roman Antiquities: An Exhibition from the Collection of Walter Cummings Baker, Esq., Held at the Century Association, New York, May 17 to September 25, 1950 (New York 1950).

Review of B. Neutsch, G. Hafner, and H. Luschey, Die Welt der Griechen; im Bilde der Originale der Heidelberger Universitätssammlung : Katalog der Jubiläumsausstellung zur 100-Jahr-Feier der Sammlungen des Archäologischen Instituts Heidelberg im Sommersemester 1948 (Heidelberg 1948), in AJA 54 (1950) 282-83.

Review of E. Kunze, Neue Meisterwerke griechischer Kunst aus Olympia (Munich1948), in AJA 54 (1950) 283.

Review of D.K. Hill, Catalogue of Classical Bronze Sculpture in the Walters Art Gallery (Baltimore 1949), in The Classical Weekly 44 no. 4 (December 1950) 58-59.

1951

“Attic Black-figured Pelikai,” JHS 71 (1951) 40-47.

“Enkaustes Agalmaton,” BMMA 9 no. 6 (February 1951) 156-61.

Review of W. Schmalenbach, Griechische Vasenbilder (Basel 1948), in AJA 55 (1951) 117.

Review of J.W. Graham, Black-figure and Red-figure Greek Pottery (Toronto 1950), in AJA 55 (1951) 433.

1952

“Greek Sculpture,” in E.V. McLoughlin ed., The Book of Knowledge; The Children's Encyclopedia that Leads to Love of Learning (New York, Grolier Society, 1952) 2747-756.

“Some Etruscan Vases,” BMMA 10 no. 5 (January 1952) 145-49.

Review of E. Bielefeld, Amazonomachia: Beiträge zur Geschichte der Motivwanderung in der antiken Kunst (Halle 1951), in Gnomon 24 (1952) 197-200.

Review of E. Buschor, Frühgriechische Jünglinge (Munich 1950), in AJA 56 (1952) 102-103.

Review of H. Kähler, Pergamon (Berlin 1949), in AJA 56 (1952) 103.

Review of K.F. Johansen, The Attic Grave-reliefs of the Classical Period; An Essay in Interpretation (Copenhagen 1951), in AJA 56 (1952) 160.

Review of K. Schefold, Griechische Plastik I: Die grossen Bildhauer des archaischen Athen (Basel 1949), in The Classical Weekly 45 (1952) 108-109.

1953

“Greek Vases Lost and Found,” in G.E. Mylonas ed., Studies Presented to David Moore Robinson on His Seventieth Birthday 2 (St. Louis 1953) 135-38.

“Katapygōn, katapygaina,” Hesperia 22 (1953) 215-24 (co-author M.J. Milne).

“The Tawny Hippalektryon,” BMMA 11 no. 5 (January 1953) 132-36.

“Four Attic Grave Reliefs,” BMMA 11 no. 7 (March 1953) 186-89.

“A Panathenaic Amphora,” BMMA 12 no. 2 (October 1953) 52-56.

Review of D.M. Robinson, Excavations at Olynthus XIII: Vases Found in 1934 and 1938 (Baltimore 1950), in American Journal of Philology 74 (1953) 216-17.

Review of W.R. Agard, Classical Myths in Sculpture (Madison 1951), in AJA 57 (1953) 40.

Review of G. Hafner, CVA Karlsruhe 1, in AJA 57 (1953) 41-42.

Review of C. Clairmont, Das Parisurteil in der antiken Kunst (Zurich 1951), in AJA 57 (1953) 138-40.

Review of A. Rumpf, Archäologie 1: Einleitung historischer Überblick (Berlin 1953), in AJA 57 (1953) 291.

Review of H. Payne and G. Mackworth-Young, Archaic Marble Sculpture from the Acropolis: A Photographic Catalogue (New York 1951), in AJA 57 (1953) 293.

Review of E. Bielefeld, Zur griechischen Vasenmalerei des 6. bis 4. Jahrhunderts vor Christus (Halle 1952), in AJA 57 (1953) 296.

1954

“Recent Accessions of Greek and Etruscan Art,” BMMA 13 no. 2 (October 1954) 60-64.

Review of F. Brommer, Herakles: Die zwölf Taten des Helden in antiker Kunst und Literatur (Münster 1953), in AJA 58 (1954) 63-64. Review of R. Lullies, CVA Munich 3, in AJA 58 (1954) 344-45.

1955

“Two Oltos Vases in New York,” AJA 59 (1955) 157-58.

“Bronze Hydriai,” BMMA 13 no. 6 (February 1955) 193-200.

Review of F. Villard, CVA Louvre 10, in AJA 59 (1955) 67-68.

Review of [G.M.A. Hanfmann et al.] Ancient Art in American Private Collections: A Loan Exhibition at the Fogg Art Museum of Harvard University, December 28, 1954-February 15, 1955, Arranged in Honor of the 75th Anniversary of the Archaeological Institute of America (Cambridge 1954), in AJA 59 (1955) 192-93.

Review of R.M. Cook, CVA British Museum 8, in AJA 59 (1955) 248-49.

Review of K. Schauenburg, CVA Heidelberg 1, in AJA 59 (1955) 343.

1956

“Les collections de vases antiques aux Etats-Unis,” in C. Dugas and H. Metzger eds., Colloque international sur le Corpus Vasorum Antiquorum; Lyon, 3-5 juillet 1956 (Paris 1957) 35-41.

“Notes on the Mural Paintings from Boscoreale,” AJA 60 (1956) 171-72 (co-author M. Bieber).

“Two Etruscan Vases by the Paris Painter,” BMMA 14 no. 5 (January 1956) 127-32.

Review of R. Lullies ed., Neue Beiträge zur klassischen Altertumwissenschaft: Festschrift zum 60. Geburtstag von Bernhard Schweitzer (Stuttgart 1954), in AJA 60 (1956) 303-304.

“Additional Corrections to E. Vanderpool, Review of J.D. Beazley, Attic Black-figure Vase-painters (Oxford 1956),” in AJA 60 (1956) 305-306.

Review of F. Prat Puig, Sala de arte antiguo; Egipto, Grecia, Roma: coleccion Conde de Lagunillas (Havana 1956), in AJA 60 (1956) 458-59.

Review of C. Blümel, Antike Kunstwerke (Berlin 1953), in Deutsche Literaturzeitung 77 (1956) cols. 762-63.

Review of M. Pallottino and H. and I. Jucker, Art of the Etruscans (New York 1955), and S. von Cles-Reden, The Buried People: A Study of the Etruscan World, trans.

C.M. Woodhouse (New York 1955), in New York Times Book Review, January 29, 1956.

1957

Amazons in Greek Art (Oxford 1957).

“Greek Vases from the Hearst Collection,” BMMA 15 no. 7 (March 1957) 165-80.

“A Lekythos by the Pan Painter,” Bulletin of the Rhode Island School of Design 43 no. 4 (May 1957) 1-3.

Ancient Vases [at Capesthorne Hall], privately printed checklist, circa 1957.

Review of F. Brommer, Vasenlisten zur griechischen Heldensage: Herakles, Theseus, Aigeus, Erechtheus, Erichthonios, Kekrops, Kodros, Perseus, Bellerophon, Meleager, Peleus (Marburg 1956), in AJA 61 (1957) 103-10.

Review of H. Comfort, Attic and South Italian Painted Vases at Haverford College (Haverford 1956), in AJA 61 (1957) 309-10.

Review of S. Karouzou, The Amasis Painter (Oxford 1956), in Gnomon 29 (1957) 538-41.

1958

“Greek Marble Statues,” BMMA 16 no. 6 (February 1958) 187-92. “Appendix” to M. Farnsworth and H. Wisely, “Fifth Century Intentional Red Glaze,” AJA 62 (1958) 156-73, p. 173. 1959

“The Camtar Painter,” AntK 2 (1959) 5-9.

“Notes on a New Edition of Michaelis: Ancient Marbles in Great Britain, Part Three: 1,” AJA 63 (1959) 139-66 (co-author C.C. Vermeule III).

“A Panathenaic Prize Amphora,” Dartmouth Alumni Magazine 51 no. 9 (June 1959) 24-26.

“Additions to the Collections: Greek and Roman Art,” MMA Annual Report 89 (1958-1959), in BMMA 18 no. 2 (October 1959) 57-58 [unsigned].

Review of A.D. Ure, CVA Reading 1, in AJA 63 (1959) 309-10.

Review of M. Robertson, Greek Painting (Geneva 1959), in Art News 58 no. 8 December 1959) 40-41, 60.

1960

“New Vases by the Amasis Painter,” AntK 3 (1960) 71-80.

“Additions to the Collections: Greek and Roman Art,” MMA Annual Report 90 (1959-1960), in BMMA 19 no. 2 (October 1960) 44-45, 60 [unsigned].

Review of A. Greifenhagen, CVA Mannheim 1, in AJA 64 (1960) 99-100.

1961

Ancient Art from New York Private Collections: Catalogue of an Exhibition Held at the Metropolitan Museum of Art, December 17, 1959-February 28, 1960 (New York 1961).

An Inquiry into the Forgery of the Etruscan Terracotta Warriors in the Metropolitan Museum of Art, Metropolitan Museum of Art Papers no. 11 (New York 1961) (co-author J.V. Noble).“Newly Acquired Bronzes: Greek, Etruscan, and Roman,” BMMA 19 no. 5 (January 1961) 133-51.

“Greek Vases in the Recent Accessions Room,” BMMA 19 no. 5 (January 1961) 152-55.

“Etruscan, Greek, and Roman: Sculptures in the Recent Accessions Room,” BMMA 19 no. 6 (February 1961) 181-84.

“Additions to the Collections: Greek and Roman Art,” MMA Annual Report 91 (1960-1961), in BMMA 20 no. 2 (October 1961) 52, 67 [unsigned].

Review of R.V. Schoder, Masterpieces of Greek Art (Greenwich 1960), in AJA 65 (1961) 415-17 (co-author C.C. Vermeule III).

1962

“Five Attic Black-figured Lip-cups,” AJA 66 (1962) 255-58.

“Painted Greek Vases,” BMMA 21 no. 1 (Summer 1962) 1-11.

“A Gold Libation Bowl,” BMMA 21 no. 4 (December 1962) 154-66.

“Reports of the Departments: Greek and Roman Art,” MMA Annual Report 92 (1961-1962), in BMMA 21 no. 2 (October 1962) 76-77.

Review of F. Eichler, CVA Vienna 2, in AJA 66 (1962) 100.

1963

Attic Black-figured Amphorae, CVA New York, The Metropolitan Museum of Art 3 (New York 1963).

“Reports of the Departments: Greek and Roman Art,” MMA Annual Report 93 (1962-1963), in BMMA 22 no. 2 (October 1963) 71-72.

Review of A. Boëthius et al., Etruscan Culture, Land, and People (New York 1963), New York Times Book Review, September 22,1963, 7.

1964

MMA Guide to the Collections: Greek and Roman Art (New York 1964).

“The Head of an Archaic Greek Kouros,” AA 1964, cols. 615-27.

“Lids by Andokides,” Berliner Museen 14 (1964) 38-42.

Review of S. Dimitriu, Petre Alexandrescu, et al., CVA Bucarest 1, in AJA 70 (1966) 388-89.

1965

“Four Bronze Hydriai in the Metropolitan Museum of Art,” AJA 69 (1965) 165.

“Reports of the Departments: Greek and Roman Art,” MMA Annual Report 95 (1964-1965), in BMMA 24 no. 2 (October 1965) 62-63.

Review of M.-L. Bernhard, CVA Warsaw 3, in AJA 69 (1965) 281-82.

Review of E. Diehl, Die Hydria: Formgeschichte und Verwendung im Kult des Altertums (Mainz 1964), in Gnomon 37 (1965) 599-608.

1967

“The Case of the Morgan Centaur,” Archaeology 20 (1967) 221-22.

“Reports of the Departments: Greek and Roman Art,” MMA Annual Report 97 (1966-1967), in BMMA 26 no. 2 (October 1967) 73-75.

Review of J. Boardman and J.W. Hayes, Excavations at Tocra 1963-1965: The Archaic Deposits I (London 1966), in AJA 71 (1967) 317.

Review of B. Philippaki, The Attic Stamnos (Oxford 1967), in Gnomon 39 (1967) 813-19.

1968

“An Amphora by Exekias,” Bulletin du Musée hongrois des Beaux-Arts 31 (1968) 17-25.

“Reports of the Departments: Greek and Roman Art,” MMA Annual Report 98 (1967-1968), in BMMA 27 no. 2 (October 1968) 101-103.

Review of K. Stähler, Eine unbekannte Pelike des Eucharidesmalers (Cologne 1967), in AJA 72 (1968) 400.

1969

“Elbows Out,” RA 1969 3-15.

“Six Hydriai,” AntK 12 (1969) 26-29.

“Euboean Black-figure in New York,” MMAJ 2 (1969) 27-44.

“Aspects of a Collection,” BMMA 27 no. 10 (June 1969) 425-36.

Greek Vases and Modern Drawings from the Collection of Mr. and Mrs. Walter Bareiss, exh. checklist (New York 1969) (co-author J.L. Bean).

“Plate [in A.B. Martin loan exh.],” BMMA 28 no. 3 (November 1969) 149 [unsigned].

“Reports of the Departments: Greek and Roman Art,” MMA Annual Report 99 (1968-1969), in BMMA 28 no. 2 (October 1969) 77-78.

Review of B. Segall, Zur griechischen Goldschmiedekunst des vierten Jahrhunderts v. Chr.: Eine griechische Schmuckgruppe im Schmuckmuseum Pforzheim (Wiesbaden 1966), in Archaeology 22 (1969) 332-33.

1970

“Sir John Beazley,” Oxford Magazine, June 12, 1970, 299-302.

“The Case of the Dunedin Painter: New Evidence,” California Studies in Classical Antiquity 3 (1970) 35-43.

Contribution to In Tribute to Suzanne E. Chapman (Boston 1970).

“Greek and Roman Art,” MMA Annual Report 100 (1969-1970), in BMMA 29 no. 2 (October 1970) 82-83.

Review of F.G. Lo Porto, CVA Turin 2, in AJA 74 (1970) 114-15.

1971

“Three Vases by the Amasis Painter,” Madrider Mitteilungen 12 (1971) 123-30.

“Greek and Roman Art,” MMA Annual Report 101 (1970-1971) 19 [unsigned].

Review of G. Trias de Arribas, Ceramicas griegas de la Peninsula Ibérica (Valencia 1967-1968), in AJA 75 (1971) 104-105.

1972

Fouilles de Xanthos IV: Les céramiques archaïques et classiques de l’Acropole lycienne (Paris 1972) (co-authors H. Metzger and J.N. Coldstream).

“Greek Vase Painting: An Introduction,” BMMA 31 no. 1 (Fall 1972) 3-68 [also issued separately as Greek Vase Painting: An Introduction].

“A Neck-amphora in the Collection of Walter Bareiss: II. The Ancient Repairs,” AJA 76 (1972) 9-11.

“A Unique Pair of Attic Vases,” RA 1972, 83-92.

“Outstanding Recent Accessions,” BMMA 30 no. 4 (May 1972) 206.“Departmental Accessions: Greek and Roman Art,” MMA Annual Report 102 (1971-1972) 43-44 [unsigned].

Review of F. Palange, CVA Como 1, in AJA 76 (1972) 339.

Review of L. Vlad Borelli, CVA Orvieto, Museo Claudio Faina 1, in AJA 76 (1972) 339-40.

1973

Contributions to H. Hoffmann et al., CVA Museum of Fine Arts, Boston 1 (Mainz 1973).

“Departmental Accessions: Greek and Roman Art,” MMAJ 7 (1973) 157, 166-67.

“Departmental Accessions: Greek and Roman Art,” MMA Annual Report 103 (1972-1973) 43-44 [unsigned].

Review of P. Mingazzini, Catalogo dei Vasi della Collezione Augusto Castellani 2 (Rome 1971), in AJA 77 (1973) 352-53.

1974

Entries in O.W. Muscarella ed., Ancient Art: The Norbert Schimmel Collection, exh. cat. (Mainz 1974) (reprinted in J. Settgast ed., Von Troja bis Amarna: The Norbert Schimmel Collection, New York, exh. cat. [Mainz 1978]).

“Two Bronze Hydriai in Malibu,” GettyMusJ 1 (1974) 15-22.

Greek Vase Painting: An Introduction (New York 1974) [originally appeared as BMMA 31 no. 1 (Fall 1972)].

“Departmental Accessions: Greek and Roman Art,” MMA Annual Report 104 (1973-1974) 45-46 [unsigned].

1975

MMA Guide to the Collections: Greek and Roman Art, 3rd ed. (New York 1975).

“A Curator's Choice,” in T.P.F. Hoving ed., The Chase, The Capture: Collecting at the Metropolitan (New York 1975) 111-22.

Contribution to From the Lands of the Scythians: Ancient Treasures from the Museums of the U.S.S.R., 3000 B.C.-100 B.C., exh. cat. (New York 1975) (=BMMA 32 no. 5 (1973/1974).

“Greek and Roman Art,” MMA Notable Acquisitions 1965-1975 (New York 1975) 114-31.

“Departmental Accessions: Greek and Roman Art,” MMA Annual Report 105 (1974-1975) 60-61.

Review of J. Boardman, Athenian Black Figure Vases: A Handbook (London 1974), in The Art Bulletin 57 (1975) 120-22.

1976

Attic Black-figured Neck-amphorae, CVA New York, The Metropolitan Museum of Art 4 (New York 1976) (co-author M.B. Moore).

“The Babuino Bronzes,” in L. Bonfante and H. von Heintze eds., In Memoriam Otto J. Brendel: Essays in Archaeology and the Humanities (Mainz 1976) 155-58.

“Der Euphronioskrater in New York,” AA 1976, 485-512.

General preface for the series Vasi antichi dipinti del Vaticano: La Collezione Astarita nel Museo Gregoriano Etrusco, included, inappropriately, in vol. III of the series (which was the first volume to be published): A.D. Trendall, Vasi Italioti ed Etruschi a Figure rosse e di età ellenistica (Vatican 1976).

“Departmental Accessions: Greek and Roman Art,” MMA Annual Report 106 (1975-1976) 45-46.

Review of F. Eichler and W. Oberleitner, CVA Vienna 3, in AJA 80 (1976) 210-11.

Review of J. Boardman, CVA Oxford 3, in AJA 80 (1976) 316-17.

Review of H. Mommsen, Der Affecter (Mainz 1975), in AJA 80 (1976) 433-38.

Review of S. Matheson Burke, J.J. Pollitt, et al., Greek Vases at Yale, exh. cat. (New Haven 1975), in The Art Bulletin 58 (1976) 614-15.

1977

“The Struggle for the Tripod,” in U. Höckmann and A. Krug eds., Festschrift für Frank Brommer (Mainz 1977) 51-63.

Entries in W. Hornbostel ed., Kunst der Antike: Schätze aus norddeutschem Privatbesitz, exh. cat. (Mainz 1977).

“Les vases de la collection Campana,” Revue du Louvre et des Musées de France 27 (1977) 213-21.

“An Etruscan Bronze in New York,” MonPiot 61 (1977) 45-59 (co-author J. Heurgon).

“Departmental Accessions: Greek and Roman Art,” MMA Annual Report 107 (1976-1977) 52-53.

1978

“History of the Greek And Roman Department” (trans. into Russian), in Antichnoe iskusstvo iz muzeia Metropoliten: Soedinennye Shtaty Ameriki, exh. cat. (Moscow 1978).

Contribution to M. True et al., CVA Museum of Fine Arts, Boston 2 (Mainz 1978).

“Curatorial Reports: Greek and Roman Art,” MMA Annual Report 108 (1977-1978) 44-45.

Review of A. Lezzi-Hafter, Der Schuwalow-Maler (Mainz 1975), in AJA 82 (1978) 124-28.

1979

Greek Art of the Aegean Islands, exh. cat. (New York 1979).

Entries in W.G. Moon and L. Berge eds., Greek Vase-Painting in Midwestern Collections exh. cat. (Chicago 1979).

“A Bronze Oinochoe in New York,” in G. Kopcke and M.B. Moore eds., Studies in Classical Art and Archaeology: A Tribute to Peter Heinrich von Blanckenhagen (New York 1979) 63-67.

“Greek and Roman Art,” MMA Notable Acquisitions, 1975-1979 (New York 1979) 13-16.

“Curatorial Reports: Greek and Roman Art,” MMA Annual Report 109 (1978-1979) 33-34.

Review of R.-M. Becker, Formen attischer Peliken (Böblingen 1977), in AJA 83 (1979) 361-62.

1980

“The Affecter Amphora,” Journal of the Walters Art Gallery 38 (1980) 94-107.

“Greek and Roman Art,” MMA Notable Acquisitions, 1979-1980 13-16.

“Curatorial Reports: Greek and Roman Art,” MMA Annual Report 110 (1979-1980) 36-37.

1981

“The Death of Sarpedon,” in S.L. Hyatt ed., The Greek Vase: Papers Based on Lectures Presented to a Symposium Held at Hudson Valley Community College at Troy, New York in April 1979 (Latham 1981) 63-80.

“Observations of a Curator of Greek and Roman Art,” Convegni Internazionali per la Difesa delle Opere d’Arte appartenenti alle Nazioni e alle Religioni: Firenze, 1971 e 1975 (Florence 1981) 109-12.

“Les Trésors de l’orfèverie de la Grèce orientale au Métropolitan Museum de New York,” CRAI 1981, 194-207.

“Amasis, Amasidos,” GettyMusJ 9 (1981) 1-4.

“A Cup in Berne,” Hefte des Archäologischen Seminars der Universität Bern 7 (1981) 37-43.

“A New Kleitias Fragment from Egypt,” AntK 24 (1981) 66-67.

“Greek and Roman Art,” MMA Notable Acquisitions 1980-1981 (New York 1981) 11-16.

“Curatorial Reports: Greek and Roman Art,” MMA Annual Report 111 (1980-1981) 35-37.

Review of A.W. Johnston, Trademarks on Greek Vases (Warminster 1979), in AJA 85 (1981) 352-55.

1982

“Notes on Makron,” in D.C. Kurtz and B.A. Sparkes eds., The Eye of Greece: Studies in the Art of Athens (Cambridge 1982) 29-52.

The Search for Alexander: Supplement to the Catalogue (New York 1982) (co-author J.R. Mertens).

Entries in The Vatican Collections: The Papacy and Art, exh. cat. (New York 1982) 184-91.

Entries in I.E. Rubin ed., The Guennol Collection 2 (New York 1982).

“Greek and Roman Art,” Notable Acquisitions 1981-1982 (New York 1982) 10-12.

“Curatorial Reports: Greek and Roman Art,” MMA Annual Report 112 (1981-1982) 31-32.

Review of J. Burow, CVA Tübingen 3, in Gnomon 54 (1982) 93-95.

Review of C. Dunant and L. Kahil, CVA Geneva 2, in Gnomon 54 (1982) 159-61.

Review of H. Mommsen, CVA Berlin 5, in Gnomon 54 (1982) 315-17.

1983

“Walter Bareiss as a Collector,” in Greek Vases: Molly and Walter Bareiss Collection, text by J. Frel and M. True, exh. cat. (Malibu 1983) 1-3.

“Notes on Collectors of Vases,” and entries, in J.M. Cody ed., Wealth of the Ancient World: The Nelson Bunker Hunt and William Herbert Hunt Collections, exh. cat. (Fort Worth 1983) 37-44, 66-69.

“Echoes from Egypt,” in H. De Meulenaere and L. Limme eds., Artibus Aegypti: Studia in Honorem Bernardi V. Bothmer (Brussels 1983) 15-23.

“The Execution of the Drawings,” in D.C. Kurtz, The Berlin Painter (Oxford 1983) 6-8.

“Observations on the Subject Matter of South Italian Vases,” Arts in Virginia 23 no. 3 (1983) 28-43.

“Greek and Roman Art,” MMA Notable Acquisitions, 1982-1983 (New York 1983) 8-9.

“Curatorial Reports: Greek and Roman Art,” MMA Annual Report 113 (1982-1983) 34-35.

Review of L. Burn and R. Glynn, Beazley Addenda: Additional References to ABV, ARV 2 and Paralipomena (Oxford 1982), in Gnomon 55 (1983) 567-69.

1984

A Greek and Roman Treasury, BMMA 42 no. 1 (Summer 1984).

“Curatorial Reports: Greek and Roman Art,” MMA Annual Report 114 (1983-1984) 34-35.

Review of E. Böhr, Der Schaukelmaler (Mainz 1982), in AJA 88 (1984) 81-84.

Review of G. Pianu, Ceramiche etrusche sovradipinte: Materiali del Museo Archeologico Nazionale di Tarquinia 3 (Rome 1982), in The Classical World 77 no. 3 (1984) 199.

1985

The Amasis Painter and His World: Vase-painting in Sixth-century B.C. Athens, exh. cat. (Malibu and New York 1985) (introduction by A.L. Boegehold).

Bits and Myths: Greek Vase Fragments and Their Meaning; from the Collection of Dietrich von Bothmer, exh. cat. (St. Paul's School, Concord, New Hampshire, 1985).

“Beazley the Teacher,” in D.C. Kurtz ed., Beazley and Oxford: Lectures Delivered in Wolfson College, Oxford, 28 June 1985 (Oxford 1985) 5-17.

“Greek and Roman Art,” MMA Notable Acquisitions 1984-1985 (New York 1985) 6-7.

“Curatorial Reports: Greek and Roman Art,” MMA Annual Report 115 (1984-1985) 37-38.

Review of K. Hitzl, Die Enstehung und Entwicklung des Volutenkraters von den frühesten Anfängen bis zur Ausprägung des kanonischen Stils in der attisch schwarzfigurigen Vasenmalerei (Frankfurt 1982), in Gnomon 57 (1985) 66-71.

Review of B. von Freytag et al. eds., Praestant Interna: Festschrift für Ulrich Hausmann (Tübingen 1982), in AJA 89 (1985) 361-63.

1986

Co-editor with M.B. Moore of J.D. Beazley, The Development of Attic Black-figure, rev. ed. (Berkeley 1986).

Collaboration with M.B. Moore and M.Z. Pease Philippides, The Athenian Agora XXIII: Attic Black-figured Pottery (Princeton 1986).

“Observations on Proto–Volute-kraters, in M. Del Chiaro and W.R. Biers eds., Corinthiaca: Studies in Honor of Darrell A. Amyx (Columbia 1986) 107-16.

“An Inscribed Red-figured Lekythos,” in E. Böhr and W. Martini eds., Studien zur Mythologie und Vasenmalerei: Konrad Schauenburg zum 65. Geburtstag am 16. April 1986 (Mainz 1986) 65-70.

“Lids by the Amasis Painter,” in H.A.G. Brijder, A.A. Drukker, and C.W. Neeft eds., Enthousiasmos: Essays on Greek and Related Pottery Presented to J.M. Hemelrijk (Amsterdam 1986) 83-91.

“An Archaic Red-figured Kylix,” GettyMusJ 14 (1986) 5-20.

“Greek and Roman Art,” MMA Recent Acquisitions: A Selection 1985-1986 (New York 1986) 8-9.

“Curatorial Reports: Greek and Roman Art,” MMA Annual Report 116 (1985-1986) 28-29.

1987

Greek Vase Painting, rev. ed. (New York 1987) [originally appeared as BMMA 31 no. 1 (Fall 1972); republished 1974].

Introduction, and “Antiquities Donated to the Metropolitan Museum of Art,” in E.S. Hall ed., Antiquities from the Collection of Christos G. Bastis (Mainz 1987) ix, 313-27.

“Ajax et Cassandre par le Peintre de Princeton,” AntK 30 (1987) 58-68 (co-author J. Chamay)

“Greek Vase-Painting: Two Hundred Years of Connoisseurship,” in Papers on the Amasis Painter and His World (Malibu 1987) 184-204. “Euphronios and Memnon? Observations on a Red-figured Fragment,” MMAJ 22 (1987) 5-11.

“Curatorial Reports: Greek and Roman Art,” MMA Annual Report 117 (1986-1987) 30-31.

Review of H.A.G. Brijder, Siana Cups I and Komast Cups, in Gnomon 59 (1987) 716-21.

Review of E.R. Williams, The Archaeological Collection of the Johns Hopkins University (Baltimore 1984), in AJA 91 (1987) 350-51.

1988

“Greek and Roman Art,” MMA Recent Acquisitions: A Selection 1987-1988 (New York 1988) 8-9.

“Curatorial Reports: Greek and Roman Art,” MMA Annual Report 118 (1987-1988) 28-29.

Review of A.-F. Laurens, Société Archéologique de Montpellier; Catalogue des Collections II: Céramique attique et apparentée (Paris 1984), in AJA 92 (1988) 140-42.

Review of E. Böhr, CVA Tübingen 4, in Gnomon 60 (1988) 180-82.

1989

Entries in K. Hamma ed., The Dechter Collection of Greek Vases, exh. cat. (San Bernardino 1989).

“Armorial Adjuncts,” MMAJ 24 (1989) 65-70.

“Greek and Roman Art,” Recent Acquisitions: A Selection 1988-1989, in BMMA 47 no. 2 (Fall 1989) 8-9.

“Curatorial Reports: Greek and Roman Art,” MMA Annual Report 119 (1988-1989) 28-29.

1990

Editor, and author (sixty entries), Glories of the Past: Ancient Art from the Shelby White and Leon Levy Collection, exh. cat. (New York 1990).

“Euphronios: An Attic Vase-painter's View of the Human Body,” Dialexeis 1986-1989 (Athens 1990) 25-42.

“Euphronios: les nouveaux témoignages,” and entries, in A. Pasquier and M. Denoyelle eds., Euphronios, peintre a Athènes au VIe siècle avant J.-C., exh. cat. (Paris 1990) 17-23 (reprinted in Capolavori di Euphronios: un pioniere della ceramografia Attica [Milan 1990], Euphronios, pittore ad Atene nel VI secolo a.C. [Milan 1991], and Euphronios der Maler [Milan 1991]). “Euphronios,” CRAI 1990, 621-28.

“J.D. Beazley,” in W.W. Briggs and W.M. Calder eds., Classical Scholarship: A Biographical Encyclopedia (New York 1990) 1-6. Preface to R. Olmos ed., Vasos Griegos: Colección Condes de Lagunillas (Zürich 1990) 6-7.

“Greek and Roman Art,” Recent Acquisitions: A Selection 1989-1990, in BMMA 48 no. 2 (Fall 1990) 11.

“Curatorial Reports: Greek and Roman Art,” MMA Annual Report 120 (1989-1990) 25.

1991

“Etruria and American Collecting: The Early Years,” and entries, in F. Roncalli ed., Antichità dall’Umbria a New York, exh. cat. (Perugia 1991) 47-49.

1992

“The Subject Matter of Euphronios,” in M. Denoyelle ed., Euphronios peintre (Paris 1992) 13-32.

“Amasis,” Enciclopedia dell’arte antica, classica e orientale, secondo supplemento, vol. I, (Rome 1992) 203-204.

“Souvenirs d’un conservateur des vases grecs,” in A.-F. Laurens and K. Pomian eds., L’Anticomanie: La collection d’antiquités au 18e et 19e siècles (Paris 1992) 348-51.

Review of B. Freyer-Schauenburg, CVA Kiel 1, in Gnomon 64 (1992) 184-85.

Review of B. Fellmann, CVA Munich 10-11, in Gnomon 64 (1992) 275.

1993

“The Greeks and the Sea as Reflected in Attic Vase-painting,” in S. Vrionis ed., The Greeks and the Sea (New Rochelle 1993) 31-69.

“Vertical Handle from a Hydria,” Recent Acquisitions: A Selection 1992-1993, in BMMA 51 no. 2 (Fall 1993) 14.

1994

“Sarpedon,” LIMC VII (Zurich 1994), 698-700.

1995

Preface to H.A. Shapiro, C.A. Picón, and G.D. Scott III, Greek Vases in the San Antonio Museum of Art (San Antonio 1995) 11-14. “Hydria,” Recent Acquisitions: A Selection 1994-1995, in BMMA 53 no. 2 (Fall 1995) 8.

Review of M.F. Kilmer, Greek Erotica on Attic Red-Figure Vases (London 1993), in Classical Journal 91 no. 1 (October-November 1995) 82-86.

1997

“Fragmentary Red-figured Psykter Attributed to Smikros,” Recent Acquisitions: A Selection 1996-1997, in BMMA 55 no. 2 (Fall 1997) 12.

1998

“La Villa Grecque Kérylos: Domaine d’un Collectionneur,” CRAI 1998, 527-53.

“Forgeries of Greek Vases,” Minerva, March-April 1998, 8-17.

2000

“The Quest for Lykaon, Son of Ares and Pyrene,” Homère chez Calvin: Figures de l’hellénisme à Genève, Mélanges Olivier Reverdin, exh. cat. (Geneva 2000) 299-303.

Review of S. Mayer-Emmerling and U. Vedder, CVA Frankfurt 4 (Munich 1994), in Gnomon 72 (2000), 85-88.

Review of E. Kunze-Götte, Der Kleophrades-Maler unter Malern schwarzfiguriger Amphoren: Eine Werkstattstudie (Mainz 1992), in Gnomon 72 (2000) 156-61.

2001

“Euphronios,” in R. Vollkommer and D. Vollkommer-Glökler eds., Künstlerl lexikon der Antike I (Munich and Leipzig, 2001) 231-56.

“Oltos, Andocidès et l’expérimentation de la technique à figures rouges,” MonPiot 80 (2001) 35-56 (co-author M. Denoyelle).

2002

“Naturalisme et illusion: les ‘Vases grecs et étrusques’ d’Alexandre-Isodore Lery de Barde (1777-1828),” La Revue du Louvre et des musées de France 2002 no. 2 33-42 (co-author M. Denoyelle).

2004

“Smikros,” in R. Vollkommer and D. Vollkommer-Glökler eds., Künstlerl exikon der Antike II (Munich and Leipzig, 2004) xxx-xxx.

=== Death ===
A resident of both the Manhattan borough of New York City and Oyster Bay, New York, Dietrich von Bothmer died at age 90 on October 19, 2009, in Manhattan. He was survived by his wife, Joyce de La Bégassière (née Blaffer), as well as by a son, Bernard von Bothmer of San Francisco, a daughter, Maria Villalba of New York City, three stepdaughters, five grandchildren, and five step-grandchildren. His brother was the renowned Egyptologist Bernard V. Bothmer, who died in 1993.

=== External links ===
- Greek vase painting, a catalog from The Metropolitan Museum of Art Libraries (fully available online as PDF) by Dietrich von Bothmer
