= NYC Arts =

- Also known as: SundayArts (2008-2012); SundayArts Primetime (2008-2012)
- Presented by: Paula Zahn; Philippe de Montebello; Christina Ha
- Country of origin: United States
- Original language: English

Production
- Production locations: New York City, New York, United States
- Running time: 30 Minutes

Original release
- Network: WNET; WLIW; NJ PBS (2011-2026)
- Release: March 2008 – present

NYC Arts, stylized as NYC-ARTS and formerly called Sunday Arts and SundayArts Primetime, is a program dedicated to promoting cultural groups, activities and events in the New York tri-state area produced by and aired by WNET. It is also aired on its sister station, WLIW in Long Island and from 2011 to 2026, NJ PBS in New Jersey.

The show and its official blog debuted in March 2008 as SundayArts and is hosted by Paula Zahn and Philippe de Montebello with cultural news reports by Christina Ha. The show was renamed from SundayArts to NYC-Arts effective February 2, 2012. The blog also moved to NYC-ARTS.Org. The final episode aired under the SundayArts Primetime banner was January 26, 2012.

On its official website, NYC-ARTS "aims to increase awareness of New York City’s nonprofit cultural organizations, whose offerings greatly benefit residents and visitors—from children to adults, and teenagers to senior citizens" via its various social media platforms, and television shows.

== Airtimes ==
First-run broadcasts

- Thursdays at 8pm /WNET
- Fridays at 7pm /WLIW

Rebroadcasts

- Sundays at Noon /WNET
- Sundays at 3pm / WLIW
- Sundays 8:30pm / NJTV
