= Alfredo Fioravanti =

Italian sculptor (1886–1963)

Alfredo Adolfo Fioravanti (1886–1963) was an Italian sculptor, who was part of the team that forged the Etruscan terracotta warriors in the Metropolitan Museum of Art.
