= Philippe de Montebello =

French-American museum director (born 1936)

- Born: Guy Philippe Henri Lannes de Montebello; May 16, 1936 (age 90); Paris
- Education: Harvard University; New York University Institute of Fine Arts
- Occupation: museum director
- Known for: Director of the Metropolitan Museum of Art
- Children: Laure de Montebello; Marc André Marie de Montebello; Charles de Montebello

Philippe de Montebello (born May 16, 1936 in Paris) is a French and American museum director. He served from 1977 to 2008 as the director of the Metropolitan Museum of Art in New York. On his retirement, he was both the longest-serving director in the institution's history and the third longest-serving director of any major art museum in the world (first is Irina Antonova while the second is Knud W. Jensen). From January 2009, Montebello took up a post as the first Fiske Kimball Professor in the History and Culture of Museums at New York University's Institute of Fine Arts.

Born to a French aristocratic family, de Montebello immigrated to the United States of America in the 1950s, and became a naturalized citizen of the US in 1955. He was educated in New York City at the Lycée Français de New York, graduated from Harvard University with a degree in art history, and earned an MA from New York University, after which he embarked on a career in fine arts. He became the Director of the Metropolitan Museum in 1977 and has become widely known as the public face of the museum.

He announced his retirement on January 8, 2008, stating that he intended to step down by the end of 2008 after more than 31 years at his post. He is currently the chairman of the Hispanic Society of America, and became a director in 2017 of the Aquavella Galleries in New York.

== Biography ==
=== Early life ===
Born Guy Philippe Henri Lannes de Montebello in Paris in 1936 to a family descended from Jean Lannes, Duke of Montebello, a lowborn soldier elevated to high nobility by his close friend Napoleon I (Jean Lannes was one of de Montebello's great-great-great-grandfathers). De Montebello was the second of four sons. His father, Marquis André Roger Lannes de Montebello, December 2, 1986), was a portrait painter, art critic and a member of the French Resistance during World War II. His mother, Germaine Wiener de Croisset, was a descendant of the Marquis de Sade, a daughter of the playwright Francis de Croisset, and a half-sister of the arts patron Marie-Laure de Noailles.

Both parents were involved in a project to develop a form of three-dimensional photography, and it was in search of venture capital for this enterprise that the family came to New York in 1951. Whereas his brothers would all eventually return to France to take up jobs in banking, he stayed in the United States and became an American citizen in 1955.

De Montebello was educated at the Lycée Français in New York, where he received his baccalauréat in 1954. He then went on to study art history at Harvard University, graduating magna cum laude in 1958. During his freshman year, De Montebello lived in Stoughton Hall. He continued his studies at the New York University Institute of Fine Arts, where he studied under Charles Sterling, an expert in French Renaissance art.

=== Early career ===
In 1963, he began work for the Met as a curatorial assistant in the Department of European Paintings, rising to full curator. He then spent four-and-a-half-years (1969–1974) as Director of the Museum of Fine Arts in Houston, Texas, returning to the Met as vice director for curatorial and educational affairs. He became director in 1977.

=== Family ===
On June 24, 1961 in New York, he married Edith Myles (born in New York, October 20, 1939, d. September 16, 2025), who is the financial-aid director of the Trinity School in New York City. They have three children.

=== Retirement ===
On January 8, 2008, he announced his intention to retire by the end of 2008 (Vogel, Carol (2008-01-09). "Director (and Voice) of Met Museum to Retire". The New York Times.). He was succeeded by Thomas Campbell in September 2008.

== Teaching ==
De Montebello is the first professor to teach the history and culture of museums at New York University's Institute of Fine Arts. He began teaching at NYU in January 2009 as well as consulting and lecturing at several museums on the modernization of their collections. In 2012, de Montebello served as the Humanitas Visiting Professor in the History of Art at the University of Cambridge.

Since 2008, De Montebello has also served as co-host of NYC-ARTS, a weekly program highlighting current New York City exhibitions, cultural institutions and profiling relevant contributors to the arts on Thirteen/WNET.

In April, 2015 the Hispanic Society of America announced the appointment of Philippe de Montebello to chair the Society's Board of Overseers and spearhead a major effort to roughly double the museum's size by renovating the now-vacant, adjacent, Beaux Arts, former building of the Museum of the American Indian.

== Honors ==
Montebello was named a Gold Medal Honoree of the National Institute of Social Sciences in 1989. Montebello was made a Chevalier de la Légion d'Honneur in 1991 (he was promoted to the rank of Officier in 2007). De Montebello was elected to the American Philosophical Society in 2001 and the American Academy of Arts and Sciences in 2004. In 2007 De Montebello was awarded the Order of the Rising Sun, Gold & Silver Star, from the Government of Japan. He received the U.S. National Humanities Medal in 2009. In 2017, Montebello received the Edmund Burke Award for Culture and Society, awarded by monthly cultural review The New Criterion.

== Sources ==
- Houghton, James R. et al., Philippe de Montebello and The Metropolitan Museum of Art, 1977–2008, 184 pp, New Haven: Yale University Press, 2009, ISBN 978-0300154245

Cultural offices
Preceded by Thomas Hoving	Director of the Metropolitan Museum of Art; 1977–2008	Succeeded by Thomas P. Campbell
