= Caspar Purdon Clarke =

English architect (1846–1911)

Sir Caspar Purdon Clarke
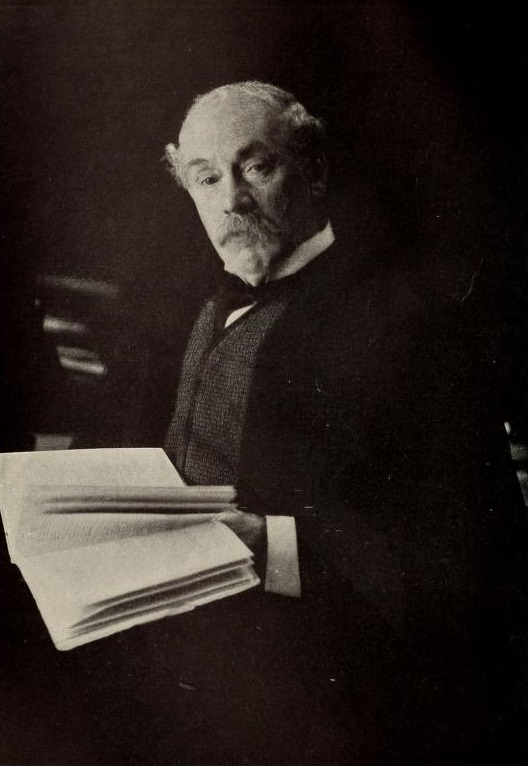
- Sir Caspar Purdon Clarke, Director of the Art Museum (Division of the Victoria and Albert Museum)
- Born: 21 December 1846; Richmond, County Dublin, Ireland
- Died: 29 March 1911; Earl's Court, London, England

Sir Caspar Purdon Clarke CIE (21 December 1846 – 29 March 1911) was an English architect and museum director.

== Early years ==
Born in 1846, Clarke was the second son of Edward Marmaduke Clarke and Mary Agnes Close. He was educated at Gaultier's School in Sydenham, Kent and Beaucourt's School in Boulogne, France. Between 1862 and 1865 he studied architecture at the National Art Training Schools at South Kensington. In 1865 he entered the office of works where he distinguished himself in work for the rebuilding of the Houses of Parliament. In 1866 he married Frances Susannah Collins with whom he had eight children, three sons and five daughters. The eldest son, Caspar Stanley Clarke became assistant keeper of the Indian section of the Victoria and Albert Museum.

== South Kensington Museum ==
In 1867 he moved to the South Kensington Museum where he oversaw mosaic reproduction. Beginning in 1874, Clarke accepted various foreign assignments as supervising architect to the crown, most notably Tehran. In 1876, Clarke travelled to Turkey, Syria, and Greece and in 1879 to Spain, Italy, and Germany buying artefacts for the Museum.

In 1878 he acted as architect of the Indian section and commercial agent to the Indian government at the Paris Exhibition. In 1880 Clarke arranged the Indian collections at South Kensington, which led to taking on the position of special commissioner in India and then becoming keeper of the India Museum at South Kensington in 1883. His acquisitions included the Hamzanama folios, early Mughal illustrations of the epic adventures of Hamza by northern Indian and Iranian artists. He also bought contemporary crafts, architectural woodwork and drawings. In 1892 Clarke was appointed Keeper of the art collections, in 1893 promoted to assistant director before finally becoming Director in 1896. During his time as Director he also filled the posts of Royal Commissioner at the 1900 Paris Exhibition and at St Louis in 1904. He resigned from the South Kensington Museum (renamed in 1899 as the Victoria and Albert Museum) in 1905.

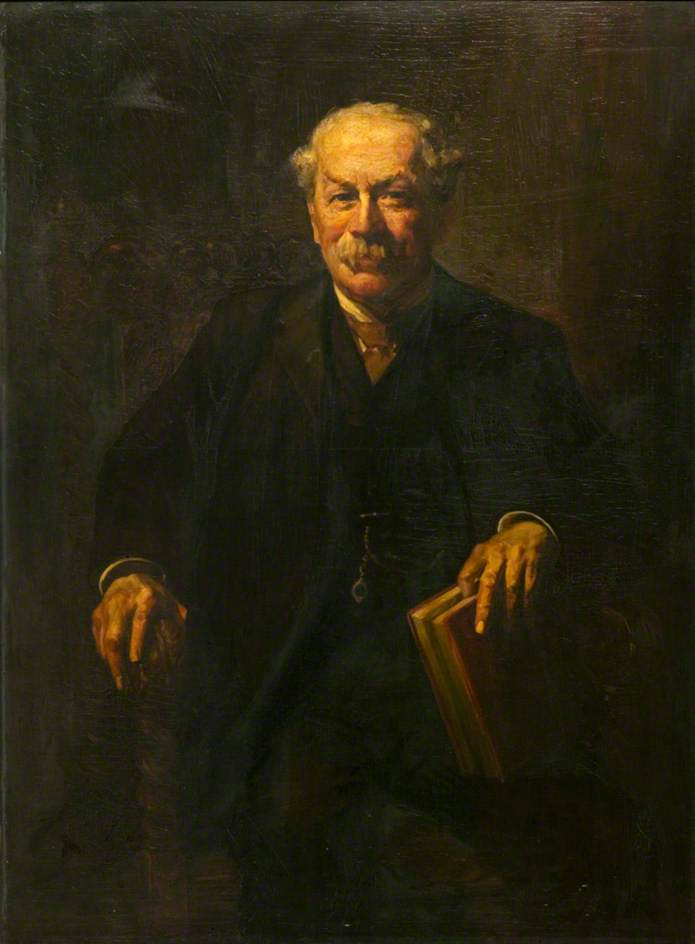
Sir Caspar Purdon Clarke (1846–1911), by George Burroughs Torrey, oil on canvas, 1907.

Whilst at the South Kensington Museum, he continued to be active as an architect and undertook several commissions in the Indian style. These included Lord Brassey's Indian Museum in Park Lane in 1887 and the Indian Palace at the 1889 Paris Exhibition. In 1899 he was commissioned, in conjunction with architect William Young, to design the Indian hall at Elvedon, Suffolk by Edward Guinness, 1st Earl of Iveagh (1847–1927). He also later advised Iveagh on the furniture and tapestries for Elvedon.

== Metropolitan Museum of Art ==
In 1904 the president and director of the Metropolitan Museum of Art in New York Luigi Palma di Cesnola died. The American millionaire and art collector J. P. Morgan (1837–1913) assumed the duties as President of the Museum and hired Clarke to be its second director. It was hoped he would be able to raise the Metropolitan Museum of Art to the international standing of the Victoria and Albert Museum. In 1905 Clarke hired Edward Robinson, the recently resigned director of the Museum of Fine Arts, Boston, to be his assistant director. He returned to England due to ill health in 1909 and resigned in 1910. He remained the museum's honorary European correspondent until his death. Clarke died at Earls Court, London on 29 March 1911.

== Other offices ==
Clarke's official duties did not stop him carrying out other notable work. In 1870 he organised and conducted evening art classes for artisans in Soho, Lambeth, and Clerkenwell and he designed Cotherstone church, Durham (1876), Alexandra House, Kensington (1886, for students at the Royal College of Music), and the National School of Cookery, South Kensington (1887). He visited America to study the housing of female students at Boston in 1884, edited a work on oriental carpets for the Austrian government in 1892, and besides lecturing, contributed numerous papers on architecture, Eastern arts and crafts, and arms and armour to the Journal of the Society of Arts, the Journal of Indian Art, the Journal of the Royal Institute of British Architects, and other publications. In 1910 he published a catalogue of the Arms and Armour at Sandringham.

He was made chevalier of the Légion d'Honneur in 1878, in which year he also received silver and bronze medals at the Paris Exhibition, which were followed by a gold medal in 1889. He was elected a fellow of the Society of Antiquaries on 4 May 1893. He was created a Companion of the Indian Empire (CIE) in 1883, and was knighted in the 1902 Coronation Honours, receiving the accolade from King Edward VII at Buckingham Palace on 24 October that year. He was also given the commander's cross of the order of the crown of Germany.

Cultural offices
Preceded by Luigi Palma di Cesnola	Director of the Metropolitan Museum of Art; 1904–1910	Succeeded by Edward Robinson
