= Allon Schoener =

American curator and writer

Allon Theodore Schoener (1926–2021) was an American curator and writer.

== Early life and career ==
Schoener was born in Cleveland, Ohio, to Harry Schoener, a factory manager, and Ida (Finkelstein) Schoener, a homemaker. His upbringing was influenced by the cultural background of his Lithuanian immigrant grandparents from New York's Lower East Side.

Schoener studied art history at Yale University, attended the Courtauld Institute in London, and earned a master's degree from Yale in 1949. His career in museum curation included roles at the San Francisco Museum of Art and as director of the Cincinnati Contemporary Arts Center in 1955. After marrying Mary Heimsath, he moved to New York in the 1960s and worked at the Jewish Museum and the New York State Council on the Arts.

In 1969, his exhibition at the Metropolitan Museum of Art, titled "Harlem on My Mind," was met with criticism for excluding works by Black artists, which led to protests. He also curated multimedia exhibitions that integrated archival photography and music, including a 1966 exhibition on Eastern European immigrants at the Jewish Museum and a 1967 exhibition on the Erie Canal that featured barge performances.

After retiring to Los Angeles in 2010, Schoener continued to monitor issues of race and representation in museum practices. His published works include The American Jewish Album, The Italian Americans, and New York: An Illustrated History of the People.
