= Thomas Hoving =

American museum executive (1931-2009)

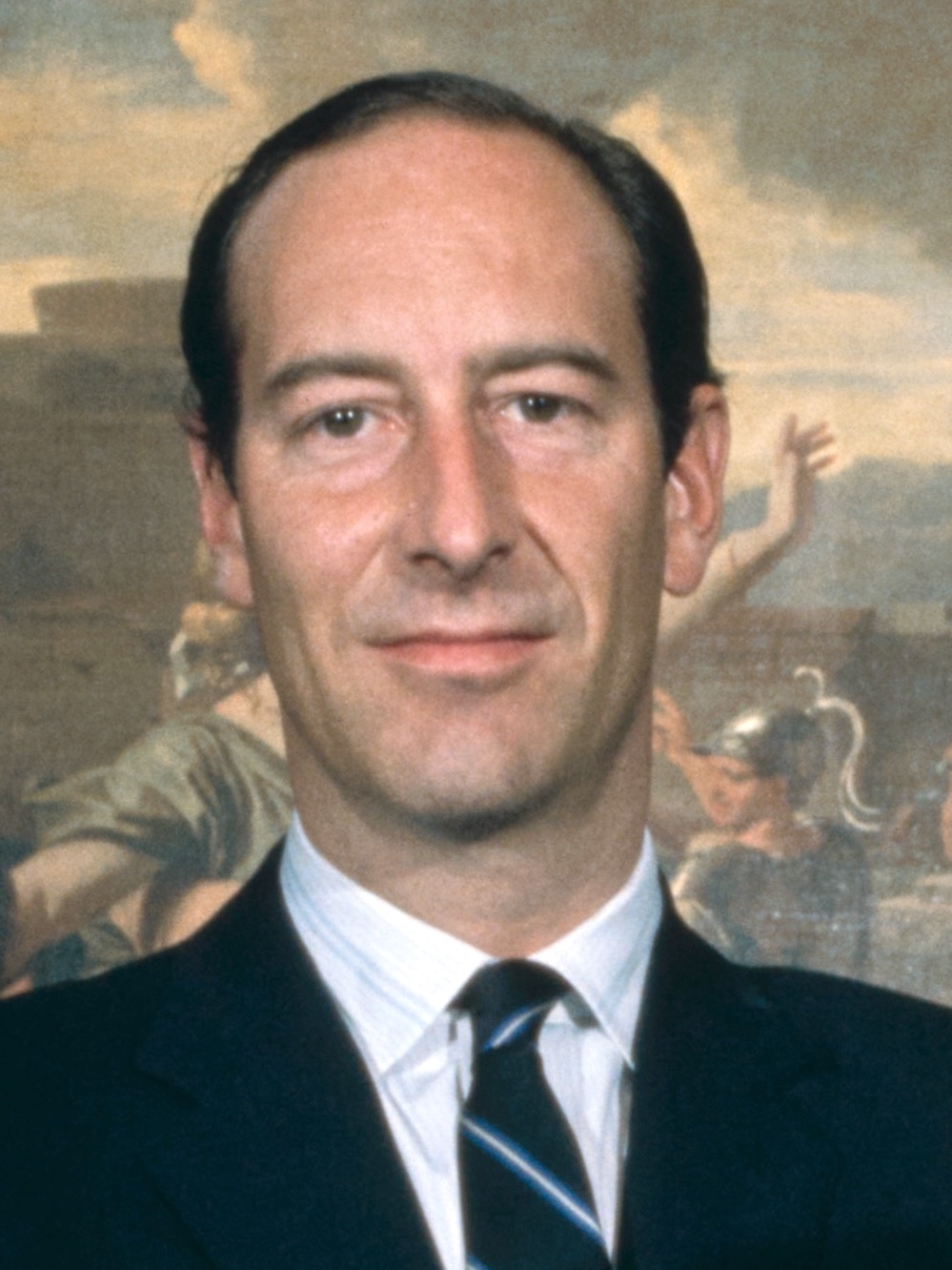
- Hoving in 1976

Director of the Metropolitan Museum of Art
- In office 1967–1977
- Preceded by: James J. Rorimer
- Succeeded by: Philippe de Montebello

Parks Commissioner of New York City
- In office 1966–1967
- Appointed by: John V. Lindsay
- Preceded by: Newbold Morris
- Succeeded by: August Heckscher II

Personal details
- Born: Thomas Pearsall Field Hoving; January 15, 1931 New York City, New York, U.S.
- Died: December 10, 2009 (aged 78) New York City, New York, U.S.
- Spouse: Nancy Bell (m. 1953)
- Children: Petrea Hoving
- Parent(s): Walter Hoving; Mary Osgood Field
- Education: Buckley School; Eaglebrook School; Phillips Exeter Academy; Hotchkiss School
- Alma mater: Princeton University

Thomas Pearsall Field Hoving (January 15, 1931 – December 10, 2009) was an American museum executive and consultant and the director of the Metropolitan Museum of Art.

== Early life ==
He was born in New York City to Walter Hoving, the head of Tiffany & Company, and his wife, Mary Osgood Field, a descendant of Samuel Osgood. Hoving grew up surrounded by New York's upper social strata. As recounted in his memoir, Making the Mummies Dance, these early experiences would be invaluable in his later dealings with the Met's donors and trustees.

After schooling at Manhattan's Buckley School, Eaglebrook School in Massachusetts and a brief stint at Exeter, Hoving graduated from the Hotchkiss School in 1949. He received a B.A. in 1953, an M.F.A. in 1958, and a Ph.D. in 1959, all from Princeton University.

== Career ==
As an undergraduate he majored in art and archaeology and supplemented his studies with regular trips to New York City to draw at the Art Students League. He went to work for the Met in 1959, serving on the staff of the medieval department at The Cloisters until 1965, when he became curator of the department.

He left the Met in 1966 to become New York mayor John V. Lindsay's parks commissioner, but in 1967 returned to the Met as director after the incumbent, James J. Rorimer, died suddenly on May 11, 1966. He assumed the directorship on March 17, 1967, and presided over a massive expansion and renovation of the museum, adding many important collections to its holdings.

=== Career at the Metropolitan Museum of Art ===
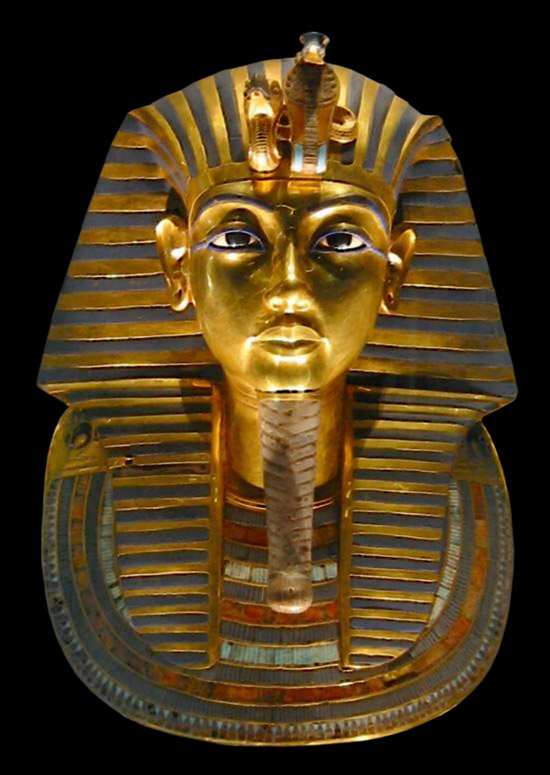
The Treasures of Tutankhamun exhibition, which travelled for nearly a decade through North America and Europe, was an important cultural event.

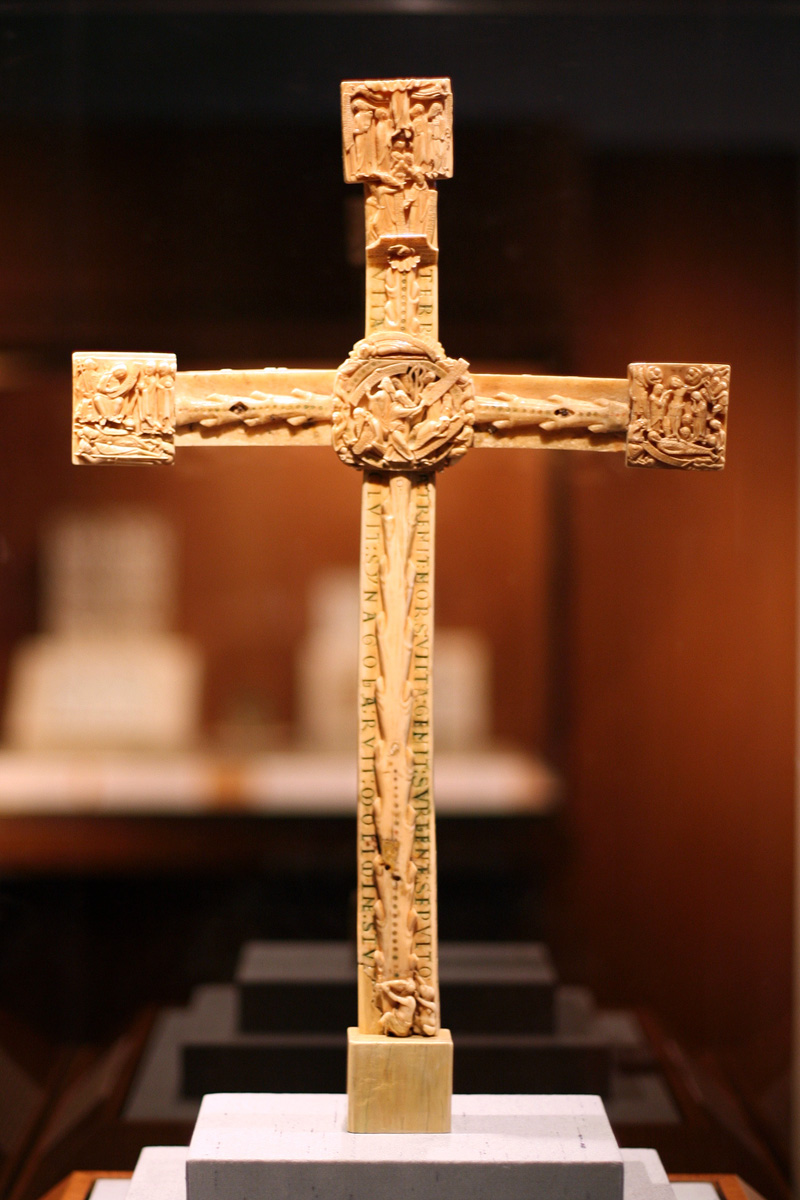
Hoving wrote about his 1960s acquisition for the Met of the controversial Cloisters Cross in a book called King of the Confessors.

His tenure at the Metropolitan Museum of Art was characterized by his distinctive approach to expanding the Met's collections. Rather than build more comprehensive holdings of relatively modest works, he pursued a smaller number of what he termed "world-class" pieces, including the Euphronios Krater depicting the death of Sarpedon (returned to Italy in 2008), Velázquez's Portrait of Juan de Pareja, and the Temple of Dendur.

The expansion of the Met during Hoving's directorship was not confined to its collections. Hoving also spearheaded a number of building projects and renovations of the Met itself, from a controversial expansion of its galleries into Central Park to the construction of its underground parking garage.

Two of the building's most characteristic features—the huge exterior banners announcing current shows, and the broad plaza and steps leading from Fifth Avenue to the Met's entryway—are products of Hoving's tenure. At one point, he even floated a plan to remove the Met's "great staircase," which leads from the central lobby to the European paintings galleries on the second-floor. He wanted to create a direct path to the new Lehman Galleries, but that particular project was never realized.

Hoving described the negotiations between the Metropolitan Museum, the Cairo Museum, Egypt's Organization of Antiquities, and the U.S. State Department to bring the exhibition The Treasures of Tutankhamun to the Met as "the high point of my Metropolitan career." The exhibition was the result of years of negotiations, including plans for a variety of cross-cultural collaborations, galvanized by President Richard M. Nixon's June 1974 trip to Egypt and finalized in an accord signed by Secretary of State Henry A. Kissinger and Foreign Minister Ismail Fahmi in October 1975. In July 1976, Hoving visited Egypt to negotiate terms of the traveling exhibition and finalize details of the Museum's collaboration with officials there.

Hoving was the director of the controversial "Harlem On My Mind" exhibit, curated by Allon Schoener, which garnered significant protests from local activists and artists for its exclusion of black artists, as well as for the inclusion of an anti-Semitic essay in the catalogue. Hoving apologized and included disclaimers before the essay in the catalogue, but did not remove it.

In his memoirs, Artful Tom (2009), he claimed that Leonardo da Vinci's masterpiece Mona Lisa, when it was on loan to the Met, was sprinkled with water for several hours inside the Metropolitan Museum. This claim was not corroborated.

=== Later career ===
He resigned from the Met on June 30, 1977. Hoving planned to direct a new private education center within the Met to be funded by the Annenberg family, but "rising controversy" caused the proposal to be abandoned. He instead started an independent consulting firm for museums, called Hoving Associates. In 1978, he published Tutankhamun. The Untold Story, a non-fiction book about the discovery of the Egyptian tomb, with particular attention to its discoverer, Howard Carter. He was the Arts and Entertainment correspondent for the ABC newsmagazine 20/20 from 1978 to 1983. His debut in its second-ever installment on June 13, 1978 was a feature about the making of Jaws 2. Another of his early features was one from 1979 about the J. Paul Getty Museum's controversial purchase of Victorious Youth. Most of what he did at 20/20 was celebrity profiles. He edited Connoisseur Magazine from 1982 to 1991. Along with his memoirs of his time at the Met, he is also the author of books on a number of art-related subjects, including art forgeries, Grant Wood, Andrew Wyeth, Tutankhamen, and the 12th-century walrus ivory crucifix known as the Bury St. Edmunds Cross. Additionally, in 1999, he wrote the text for the Art For Dummies book in the "...For Dummies" series.

== Personal life ==
In 1953, Hoving was married to Nancy Bell, a Vassar College graduate whom he met at a house party in Princeton. She was the daughter of Elliott V. Bell (1902–1983), a writer for The New York Times who managed the two successful gubernatorial campaigns for his friend, Thomas E. Dewey. They had a daughter.

Hoving died of lung cancer at his home in Manhattan, New York City, on December 10, 2009.

== In popular culture ==
Hoving appeared in Who the #$&% Is Jackson Pollock?, a 2006 documentary by Harry Moses about a supposed "lost" Jackson Pollock painting, where he dismissed the claims, believing that true connoisseurs are the only ones who can identify the real from fake paintings and that fingerprints and forensic evidence are secondary. The clincher, he stated, was that the 'Pollock' painting had a gesso ground, something that Pollock never used.

He was the subject of the titular profile in A Roomful of Hovings and Other Profiles, a 1969 collection of biographical pieces by John McPhee.

== Works ==
- Hoving, Thomas (2005). Master Pieces: The Curator's Game. W. W. Norton Company. ISBN 9780393328387.
- Hoving, Thomas (1999). Art for Dummies. IDG Books Worldwide. ISBN 978-0764551048.
- Hoving, Thomas (1997). False Impressions: The Hunt for Big-Time Art Fakes. New York: Simon & Schuster. ISBN 0-684-81134-0.
- Hoving, Thomas (1993). Making the Mummies Dance: Inside the Metropolitan Museum of Art. New York: Simon & Schuster. ISBN 978-0-671-88075-0.
- Hoving, Thomas. King of the Confessors: A New Appraisal. cybereditions.com: Christchurch, NZ, 2001.
- Hoving, Thomas. King of the Confessors. Simon & Schuster: New York, 1981.
- Hoving, Thomas. Tutankhamun. The Untold Story. Simon & Schuster: New York, 1978.
- Artful Tom, A memoir // Artnet

== Bibliography ==
- Watson, Peter (2007). The Medici Conspiracy. New York: Public Affairs. ISBN 978-1-58648-438-5.
- "Outdoorsman of the Big City", Life, April 29, 1966.
- McPhee, John (1969). A Roomful of Hovings. New York: Farrar, Straus and Giroux. ISBN 9780374515010.

Cultural offices
Preceded by James J. Rorimer	Director of the Metropolitan Museum of Art; 1967–1977	Succeeded by Philippe de Montebello
Political offices
Preceded by Newbold Morris	Parks Commissioner of New York City; 1966–1967	Succeeded by August Heckscher II
