= Boston Art Commission =

Public art organization in Boston, Massachusetts

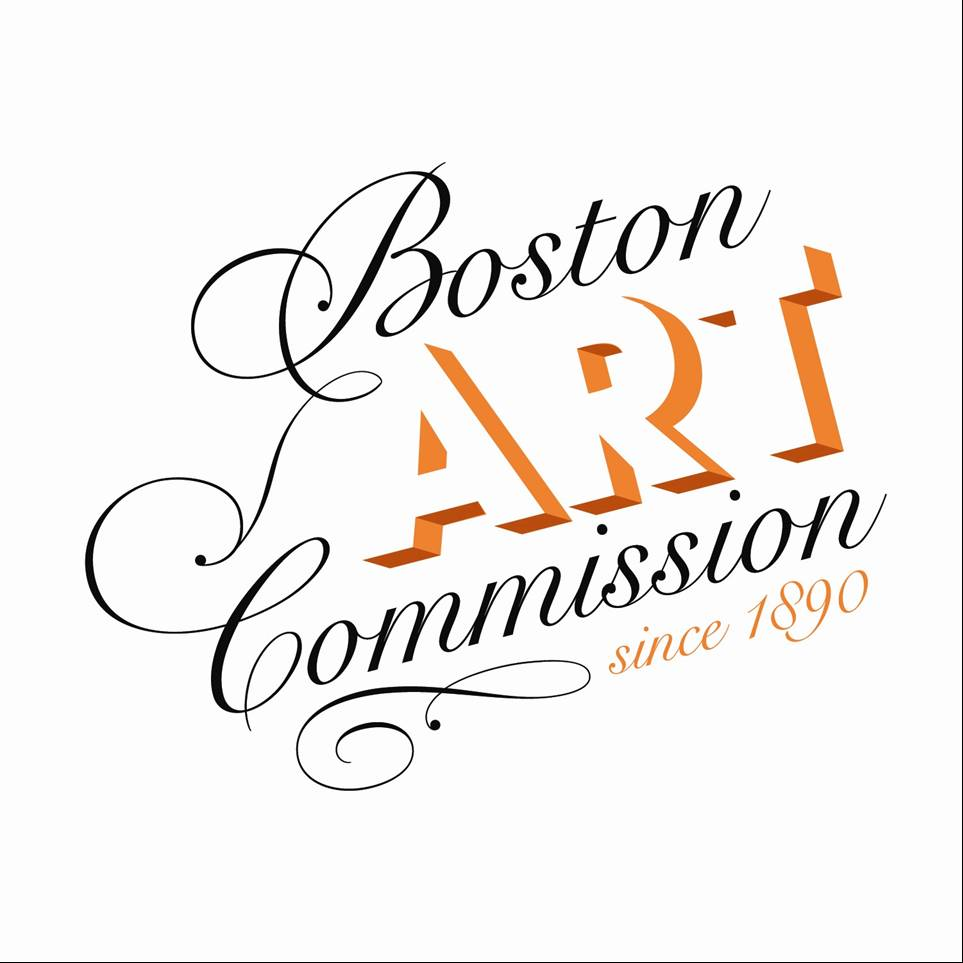
The Boston Art Commission

The Boston Art Commission, established in 1890, exercises legal authority to approve and site new public art on property owned by the City of Boston. Woven through the urban landscape, site-specific artworks identify Boston as a place with long history and a great capacity for innovation. These artworks, both permanent and temporary, range from traditional and new media public art pieces to municipal design elements, such as wayfinding systems and artistic lighting. In addition, the Art Commission has care and custody of all paintings, murals, statues, bas-reliefs, sculptures, monuments, fountains, arches and other permanent structures intended for ornament or commemoration on City property. It is the conviction of the Boston Art Commission that, in order to engender and support a thriving artistic consciousness within the city, community involvement shall extend beyond everyday appreciation to meaningful engagement in the creation, evolving interpretation and ongoing care of artworks throughout Boston's neighborhoods.

The Art Commission is appointed by the Mayor and consists of nine Boston residents, each nominated by a Boston cultural institution. Art Commission meetings are held on the second Tuesday of each month.

== Collections ==
Boston's wide range of public art works mirror key cultural debates and the ever-progressing political and social conditions of the city and the nation. Today, artists and community members work with the Mayor's Office and the Boston Art Commission to ensure that Boston's public art conveys the diversity of the city's past and current populations. The community aspect of initiating a piece of public art is critical in Boston and the city emphasizes community organizing and neighborhood projects supported by the Mayor's office through Neighborhood Coordinators. Therefore, the majority of public art pieces begin as a community effort in which the selection of a site, artist, and design are reliant on community support and participation. Additionally, the Art Commission strives to promote a varied selection of artistic styles and media. Art Commission archives, as well as the City Archives in West Roxbury, are open to the public by appointment.

== PaintBox Program ==
PaintBox aims to highlight local artists within their community and, in doing so, brighten up the streets and deter the vandalization of utility boxes. Through PaintBox, the Art Commission asks Boston artists to get out on the streets of their neighborhoods and help create an ongoing dialogue about art by painting utility boxes. The individual boxes may vary in theme and technique depending on the artist, but as the program is city-wide, PaintBox has become a dynamic art installation in itself. This program is privately funded through corporate donations and uses no tax dollars.
