= James Rorimer =

American museum curator

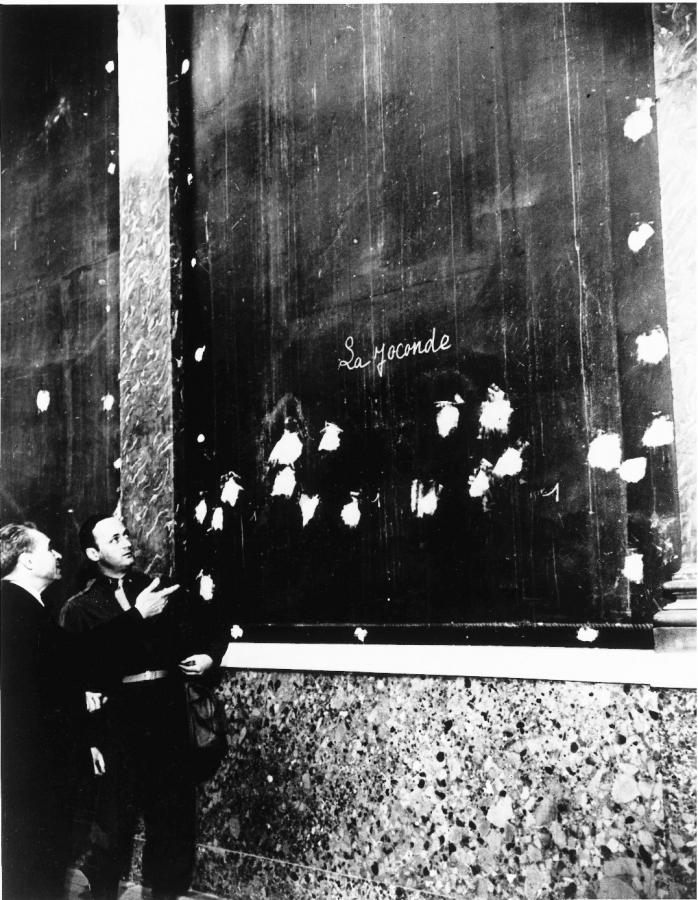
- James Rorimer (right), 1944

Director of the Metropolitan Museum of Art
- In office 1955–1966
- Preceded by: Francis Henry Taylor
- Succeeded by: Thomas Hoving

Personal details
- Born: James Joseph Rorimer; September 7, 1905 Cleveland, Ohio
- Died: May 11, 1966 (aged 60) New York, NY
- Spouse: Katherine Serrell (m. 1942)
- Children: 2
- Parent(s): Louis Rorimer; Edith Joseph
- Education: Harvard University

James Joseph Rorimer (September 7, 1905 – May 11, 1966), was an American museum curator and former director of the Metropolitan Museum of Art, where he was a primary force behind the creation of the Cloisters, a branch of the museum dedicated to the art and architecture of Medieval Europe. During World War II, Rorimer served in the U.S. Army's Monuments, Fine Arts and Archives Section, a.k.a. the "Monuments Men," protecting cultural sites and recovering stolen art work.

== Early life and work ==
Rorimer was born in Cleveland, Ohio, on September 7, 1905, the son of Edith (née Joseph) and Louis Rorimer. His family was Jewish, and their surname had originally been "Rohrheimer".

He attended high school at the University School in Cleveland. He spent 1920–1922 studying at the Ecole Gory in Paris before returning to complete his studies in the United States at Harvard University. At Harvard he studied under the museologist Paul J. Sachs and the art historian Walter Cooke. In 1927, Rorimer graduated from Harvard, magna cum laude, with a degree in fine arts.

== Career ==
Immediately out of college, he was hired by the Metropolitan Museum of Art, beginning a career with the Met that would last his entire adult life. From his initial position as an assistant in the Decorative Arts department he quickly rose through the ranks to become Curator of Medieval Art in 1934. Having worked closely with the previous curator, his mentor Joseph Breck, Rorimer used his new role to continue Breck's most important project: the planning and construction of the Cloisters, the new medieval extension to the Met.

In 1938, the Cloisters opened and Rorimer was named its curator, a position which brought with it new duties as fundraiser and developer for the new collection. Among the pieces purchased by Rorimer for the Cloisters are many of the collection's modern-day "signature works", including The Hunt of the Unicorn tapestries.

=== World War II ===
Rorimer's career at the Met was interrupted by the United States' entry into World War II, and he signed up as an infantryman in the United States Army in 1943. He was soon appointed to a job more suited to his specialized skills, as an officer of the Monuments, Fine Arts and Archives Section (MFAA) in Normandy and Paris, and, later, in Germany.

While in Paris, Rorimer had an auspicious encounter with Rose Valland, an art historian and employee of the Galerie Nationale du Jeu de Paume. During the German occupation of France, the Reichsleiter Rosenberg Taskforce—the Nazi organization in charge of the systematic looting of art and cultural artifacts—designated the Jeu de Paume museum as the central location for storing and sorting their stolen treasures. Valland was the only member of the museum's original staff retained by the Nazis. She spied on the Nazis, who did not realize that she spoke German, and kept detailed records on the transportation of artwork stolen by members of the Third Reich. She passed information on to the French Resistance and to Rorimer.

While in Germany, Rorimer was promoted to chief of the MFAA Section of the Seventh Army Western Military District, where he was tasked to uncover and preserve significant works of art stolen by the Nazis. By all accounts he relished his role as one of the "Monuments Men," and was responsible for seizing the art collections of both Göring and Goebbels.

=== Postwar career ===
After the war, Rorimer returned to the Met. In 1949, he became Director of the Cloisters, reporting directly to the Met's director, Francis Henry Taylor. In 1950, Rorimer published an account of his World War II experience called Survival: The salvage and protection of art in war. On Taylor's resignation in 1954, Rorimer was placed on the short list of candidates to fill his role, and he became director of the museum eight months later in 1955.

As director of the Met, Rorimer proved a capable administrator, though his directorship was plagued by contentious battles with trustees and the museum's staff. Nonetheless, the Met acquired many new and significant works during his 11-year tenure, including Rembrandt's Aristotle Contemplating the Bust of Homer, and attendance at the museum tripled from 2 million to 6 million visitors annually. In September and October 1965, under Rorimer's leadership, the Museum hosted the first International Council of Museums annual meeting held outside of Europe.

== Personal life ==
In 1942, Rorimer married Katherine Serrell. They had two children, Anne and Louis.

Rorimer died in his sleep on May 11, 1966, of a heart attack.

== In popular culture ==
Rorimer was an inspiration for the character of James Granger, portrayed by Matt Damon in the George Clooney-directed film The Monuments Men, released in February 2014.

Cultural offices
Preceded by Francis Henry Taylor	Director of the Metropolitan Museum of Art; 1955–1966	Succeeded by Thomas Hoving
