= Lincoln Kirstein =

American writer and art connoisseur (1907–1996)

- Lincoln Kirstein by Walker Evans

Personal details
- Born: May 4, 1907 Rochester, New York, U.S.
- Died: January 5, 1996 (aged 88) New York City, U.S.
- Spouse: Fidelma Cadmus (m. 1941; died 1991)
- Parent(s): Louis E. Kirstein; Rose Stein
- Education: Berkshire School
- Alma mater: Harvard University
- Occupation: Writer, philanthropist
- Known for: Co-founder of the New York City Ballet
- Awards: Presidential Medal of Freedom (1984); National Medal of Arts (1985)

Military service
- Years of service: 1943–1945
- Rank: Private First Class
- Unit: MFAA
- Battles/wars: World War II

Lincoln Edward Kirstein (May 4, 1907 – January 5, 1996) was an American writer, impresario, art connoisseur, philanthropist, and cultural figure in New York City, noted especially as co-founder of the New York City Ballet. He developed and sustained the company with his organizing ability and fundraising for more than four decades, serving as the company's general director from 1946 to 1989. According to the New York Times, he was "an expert in many fields", organizing art exhibits and lecture tours in the same years.

== Early life ==
Kirstein was born in Rochester, New York, to Jewish parents, the son of Rose Stein and Louis E. Kirstein (1867–1942). His brother was George Kirstein, his sister was Mina Kirstein and his paternal grandparents were Jeanette (née Leiter) and Edward Kirstein, a successful Rochester clothing manufacturer who ran E. Kirstein and Sons, Company. His maternal grandfather was Nathan Stein, a senior executive at the Stein-Bloch & Co., in Rochester. He grew up in a wealthy Bostonian family and attended the private Berkshire School, along with George Platt Lynes, graduating in 1926.

He then attended Harvard, the alma mater of his father, vice-president of Filene's Department Store, graduating in 1930. At Harvard, he founded the Society for Contemporary Art.

== Career ==
=== Early career ===
In 1927, while an undergraduate at Harvard, Kirstein was frustrated that the literary magazine The Harvard Advocate would not invite him to join its editorial board despite his having published several well-regarded pieces in the magazine. With friend Varian Fry (who met his wife Eileen through Lincoln's sister Mina), he convinced his father to finance the Hound & Horn, a new literary quarterly. After graduation, he moved to New York in 1930, taking the quarterly with him. The publication gained prominence in the artistic world and ran until 1934 when Kirstein decided to focus his energy and resources on the career of George Balanchine and the development of the School of American Ballet.

His interest in ballet and Balanchine started when he saw Balanchine's Apollo performed by the Ballets Russes. Kirstein became determined to bring Balanchine to the United States. In October 1933, together with Edward Warburg, a classmate from Harvard, and Vladimir Dimitriew, Balanchine's manager, they started the School of American Ballet in Hartford, Connecticut. In 1934, the studio moved to the fourth floor of a building at Madison Avenue and 59th Street in New York City. Warburg's father, Felix M. Warburg, invited the group of students from the evening class to perform at a private party. The ballet they performed was Serenade, the first major ballet choreographed by Balanchine in the United States. Just months later, Kirstein and Warburg founded, together with Balanchine and Dimitriew, the American Ballet, which later became the resident company of the Metropolitan Opera. According to Kirstein, this arrangement was unsatisfactory because the opera company failed to provide the ballet company with financial resources and artistic freedom. He died of heart failure on January 5, 1996 in New York City at 88.

=== World War II and Monuments Men ===
Kirstein's theatrical career was interrupted by the United States' entry into World War II. He enlisted in 1943, and before going overseas, started working on a project gathering and documenting soldier art for a prospective exhibit and book titled Artists Under Fire. He was not able to find a major book publisher, but selections from his efforts were published in Life Magazine and exhibited in part at the Museum of Modern Art, the Library of Congress, and the National Gallery of Art. In the spring of 1944, Kirstein traveled to London for the U.S. Arts and Monuments Commission, and after a month, he was transferred to the unit in France that came to be known as the Monuments, Fine Arts, and Archives (MFAA) program. The section was devoted to rescuing and preserving European art. In January 1945, Kirstein was promoted to private first class in Patton's Third Army, and his unit moved to Germany. Kirstein was involved with retrieving artworks around Munich and from the salt mines at Altaussee. His article "The Quest for the Golden Lamb" about the quest was published in Town & Country in September 1945, the same month he was discharged from the army.

=== Ballet ===
In 1946, Balanchine and Kirstein founded the Ballet Society, which was renamed the New York City Ballet in 1948. In a letter that year, Kirstein stated, "The only justification I have is to enable Balanchine to do exactly what he wants to do in the way he wants to do it." Kirstein served as the company's general director from 1946 until 1989.

In a 1959 monograph titled What Ballet Is All About Kirstein wrote: "Our Western ballet is a clear if complex blending of human anatomy, solid geometry and acrobatics offered as a symbolic demonstration of manners—the morality of consideration for one human being moving in time with another."

In 1976, poet Vernon Scannell said that Kirstein "regarded dancers not as artists but as acrobats; their skills were, he maintained, entirely physical and he felt his involvement with the dance was a salutary escape from the cerebral and sedentary life into a world that was closer to that of the athlete than the artist." Kirstein's and Balanchine's collaboration lasted until the latter's death in 1983.

=== Literary output ===
Kirstein wrote a great deal over 60 years. His bibliography was eventually almost 600 works. He published volumes on the artists he championed. He also wrote about other subjects that interested him, including Hollywood stars, the cats in fairy tales, tap dancers, and Buddhist temples. Kirstein felt his involvement in writing, starting with Hound & Horn, had helped him have many adventures in life.

== Personal life ==
Beginning in 1919, Kirstein kept a diary, continuing with the practice until the late 1930s. In writing a 2007 biography of Kirstein, The Worlds of Lincoln Kirstein, Martin Duberman drew on these diaries, as well as Kirstein's numerous letters, to gain insight into Kirstein's personal life.

Kirstein wrote about enjoying sex with various men, including Harvard undergraduates, sailors, prostitutes, and casual encounters in the showers at the 63rd Street YMCA. He had longer affairs with dancer Pete Martinez and artist Dan Maloney. He had both platonic relationships and many that started as casual sex and developed into long-term friendships.

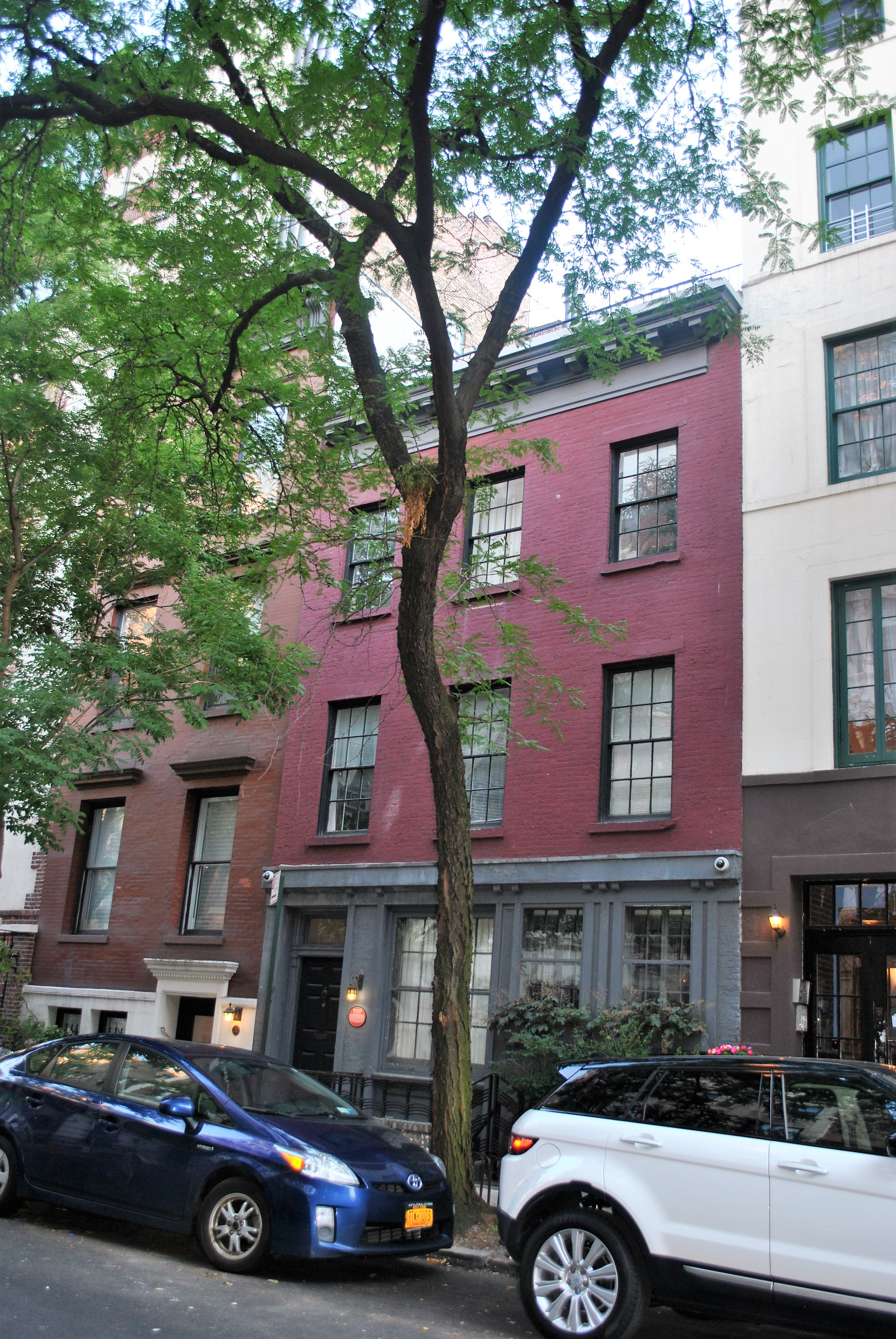
Lincoln Kirstein House, East 19th Street

He also maintained relationships with women. In 1941, he married Fidelma Cadmus, a painter and the sister of the artist Paul Cadmus. Kirstein and his wife enjoyed an amicable if sometimes stressful relationship until her death in 1991, but she withdrew from painting and then from life, suffering breakdowns that eventually were more serious than his. Some of his boyfriends lived with them in their East 19th Street house; "Fidelma was enormously fond of most of them." The New York art world considered Kirstein's bisexuality an "open secret", although he did not publicly acknowledge his sexual orientation until 1982.

Kirstein's eclectic interests, ambition and keen interest in high culture, funded by independent means, drew a large circle of creative friends from many fields of the arts. These included Glenway Wescott, George Platt Lynes, Jared French, Bernard Perlin, Pavel Tchelitchev, Katherine Anne Porter, Barbara Harrison, Gertrude Stein, Donald Windham, Cecil Beaton, Jean Cocteau, W.H. Auden, George Tooker, Margaret French Cresson, Walker Evans, and Sergei Eisenstein, among others.

In his later years, Kirstein struggled with bipolar disorder – mania, depression, and paranoia. He destroyed the studio of friend Dan Maloney. He sometimes had to be constrained in a straitjacket for weeks at a psychiatric hospital. His illness did not generally affect his professional creativity until the end of his life. He also suffered two heart attacks in February 1975.

=== Legacy ===
English critic Clement Crisp wrote: "He was one of those rare talents who touch the entire artistic life of their time. Ballet, film, literature, theatre, painting, sculpture, photography all occupied his attention."

Kirstein helped organize a 1959 American tour for musicians and dancers from the Japanese Imperial Household Agency. At that time, Japanese Imperial court music, gagaku, had only rarely been performed outside the Imperial Music Pavilion in Tokyo at some of the great Japanese shrines.

Kirstein commissioned and helped to fund the physical home of the New York City Ballet: the New York State Theater building at Lincoln Center, designed in 1964 by architects Philip Johnson and John Burgee. Despite its conservative modernist exterior, the glittery red and gold interior recalls the imaginative and lavish backdrops of the Ballets Russes. He served as the general director of the ballet company from 1948 to 1989.

Kirstein was among the public figures at the core of the effort to save Olana, the home of Frederic Edwin Church, before it was designated a National Historic Landmark in 1965 and subsequently became a New York State Historic Site.

On March 26, 1984, President Ronald Reagan presented Kirstein with the Presidential Medal of Freedom for his contributions to the arts.

Kirstein was also a serious collector. Soon after the opening at Lincoln Center of the New York Public Library for the Performing Arts, he contributed a significant amount of historic dance materials to the Jerome Robbins Dance Division. Before his death in 1996, Kirstein also donated his personal papers, artworks, and other materials related to the history of dance and his life in the arts to the division. Kirstein was also the primary patron of the artist Paul Cadmus, Fidelma's brother, buying many of his paintings and subsidizing his living expenses. Cadmus had difficulty selling his work through galleries because of the erotically charged depictions of working class and middle-class men, which provoked controversy.

Kirstein was rendered in a variety of media by artists he was friends with, or supported in their careers. These include "Walking Man", by Gaston Lachaise, and "Dans La Nuit (1935)", also by Lachaise.

In 2007, the Metropolitan Museum of Art presented A Tribute to Lincoln Kirstein (1907–1996) celebrating the centennial of his birth and his gift to the Museum of various artworks. The Museum of Modern Art (New York) presented an exhibition focused on Kirstein in 2019.

=== Honors ===
- Presidential Medal of Freedom, U.S.
- Handel Medallion, NYC, U.S.
- Brandeis University Notable Achievement Award, U.S.
- National Medal of Arts, U.S., 1985.
- Royal Society of Arts, Benjamin Franklin Medal, UK, 1981.
- National Society of Arts and Letters, National Gold Medal of Merit Award, U.S.
- National Museum of Dance Mr. & Mrs. Cornelius Vanderbilt Whitney Hall of Fame inductee, 1987.

== Theatrical credits ==
- The Saint of Bleecker Street, [Original, Play, Drama, Play with music], Production Supervisor. December 27, 1954, to April 2, 1955
- Misalliance, [Revival, Play, Comedy] New York City Drama Company, Managing director. March 6 to June 27, 1953
- Billy the Kid, [Original, Ballet], Librettist. Choreography by Eugene Loring, music by Aaron Copland, design by Jared French. Premiered May 24, 1938.
- Filling Station, [Original, Ballet, One Act], Librettist. Choreography by Lew Christensen, music by Virgil Thomson, design by Paul Cadmus. Premiered January 6, 1938.

== Published works ==
- 1929 – A Marriage Message for Mary Frost & James Maybon from Lincoln Kirstein, Paris, Boston privately published by Kirstein
- 1932 – Flesh Is Heir: An Historical Romance, a novel, New York: Brewer, Warren & Putnam
- 1934 – Nijinsky, anonymous collaboration (ghostwriting) with Romola Nijinsky, with a foreword by Paul Claudel, London: Victor Gollancz/Toronto: Ryerson Press
- 1935 – Dance: A Short History of Classic Theatrical Dancing, New York: G.P. Putnam's Sons
- 1938 – Photographs of America: Walker Evans, in: Walker Evans: American Photographs, New York: Museum of Modern Art
- 1939 – Ballet Alphabet: A Primer for Laymen, New York: Kamin Publishers
- 1943 – American Battle Painting: 1776–1918, Washington, D.C.: National Gallery of Art, Smithsonian Institution/New York: Museum of Modern Art
- 1943 – The Latin-American Collection of the Museum of Modern Art, New York: The Museum of Modern Art
- 1947 – The Drawings of Pavel Tchelitchew, and his last book, published in 1994, was Tchelitchev, a full-scale study that used a variant spelling of the artist's name.
- 1947 – "Henri Cartier-Bresson: Documentary Humanist", in: The Photographs of Henri Cartier-Bresson (with another text by Beaumont Newhall), New York: Museum of Modern Art
- 1952 – The Classic Ballet: Basic Technique and Terminology with Muriel Stuart, New York: Knopf
- 1959 – What Ballet Is All About: An American Glossary, with photographs by Martha Swope, Brooklyn, N.Y.: Dance Perspectives
- 1965 – Rhymes and More Rhymes of a Pfc., a book of poems. The poet W.H. Auden praised this book as "the most convincing, moving and impressive" book he had read about World War II.
- 1967 – Whitehouse Happening, a play about President Lincoln's assassination
- 1967 – The Dance Encyclopedia, by Anatole Chujoy, P.W. Manchester and Kirsten
- 1969 – W. Eugene Smith: Success or Failure, Art or History, in: W. Eugene Smith: His Photographs and Notes, New York: Aperture
- 1970 – Dance: A Short History of Classic Theatrical Dancing
- 1970 – Movement and Metaphor: Four Centuries of Ballet, New York and Washington: Praeger Publishers
- 1973 – Elie Nadelman, New York: Eakins Press
- 1973 – The New York City Ballet with photographs by Martha Swope and George Platt Lynes, New York: Knopf. ISBN 0-394-46652-7
- 1975 – Nijinsky Dancing
- 1978 – Thirty Years: Lincoln Kirstein's The New York City Ballet: expanded to include the years 1973–1978, in celebration of the company's thirtieth anniversary
- 1980 – Rhymes of a Pfc (rev. ed. 1980), Boston: David R. Godine. ISBN 0-87923-330-3
- 1983 – Ballet, Bias and Belief: Three Pamphlets Collected and Other Dance Writings, New York: Dance Horizons. ISBN 0-87127-133-8
- 1984 – Paul Cadmus, New York: Imago Imprint
- 1984 – Fifty Ballet Masterworks: From the 16th Century to the 20th Century
- 1987 – Quarry: A Collection in Lieu of Memoirs, Pasadena, California: Twelvetrees Press, ISBN 0-942642-27-9
- 1987 – The Poems of Lincoln Kirstein New York: Atheneum. ISBN 0-689-11923-2
- 1989 – Memorial to a Marriage, a history and meditation on the Adams Memorial, by Augustus Saint-Gaudens and Stanford White.
- 1991 – By with to and from: A Lincoln Kirstein Reader, edited by Nicholas Jenkins, New York, N.Y.: Farrar Straus and Giroux
- 1992 – Puss in Boots, by Kirstein and Alain Vaes
- 1994 – Tchelitchev, Santa Fe, New Mexico: Twelvetrees Press, ISBN 0-942642-40-6
- 1994 – Mosaic: Memoirs, New York: Farrar, Straus and Giroux
- 2007 – Lincoln Kirstein: A Bibliography of Published Writings, 1922–1996, New York: Eakins Press Foundation

== See also ==
- Roberts Commission
- Nazi Plunder
- Rescuing Da Vinci
- The Rape of Europa
- Monuments, Fine Arts, and Archives program
- Monuments Men Foundation for the Preservation of Art
- The Monuments Men In this film the character of Pvt. Preston Savitz, played by Bob Balaban, is based loosely on Kirstein.
