= The Monuments Men (book) =

2009 nonfiction book by Robert Edsel

The Monuments Men: Allied Heroes, Nazi Thieves, and the Greatest Treasure Hunt in History
- Front cover
- Author: Robert M. Edsel; Bret Witter
- Language: English
- Subject: Art theft
- Genre: Narrative nonfiction
- Publisher: Center Street
- Publication date: 2009
- Publication place: United States
- Media type: Print, e-book, audiobook
- Pages: 473
- ISBN: 978-0316240079

The Monuments Men: Allied Heroes, Nazi Thieves, and the Greatest Treasure Hunt in History is a 2009 nonfiction book by Robert M. Edsel and Bret Witter. The book recounts the efforts of the members of the Monuments, Fine Arts, and Archives program, also known as "Monuments Men", during and after World War II to protect Europe's cultural heritage and to locate and return works of art looted by the Nazis.

The book was Edsel's second work on the subject, following the 2006 pictorial history Rescuing Da Vinci. Drawing on extensive archival research, it helped revive interest in the largely forgotten program. The Monuments Men reached number one on the New York Times best-seller list and was later adapted into a 2014 film, directed by and starring George Clooney.

== Background ==
Robert M. Edsel was born in Texas and headed a successful oil exploration company until selling it in 1995. He was spending time in Europe when he began wondering how a large amount of the area's artwork and architecture had survived the considerable devastation of World War II. He became more interested in the topic after reading Lynn H. Nicholas's 1994 book The Rape of Europa, which details the Nazi plunder of Europe's art during the war. Edsel got in touch with Nicholas and offered to help produce and finance a documentary based on her book. That film ultimately released in 2007 to positive reviews.

Edsel, who had previously known little about World War II or art history, became immersed in the subjects. He established a Dallas-based office and hired a staff with the aim of researching the so-called "Monuments Men" – a group of artists, historians, and museum curators who worked for the American and British militaries attempting to find and preserve important artworks and cultural monuments. In 2006, Edsel published Rescuing Da Vinci, a book consisting of 460 photographs displaying a visual history of the Monuments, Fine Arts, and Archives program for which the Monuments Men worked.

In 2007, Edsel successfully lobbied the U.S. Congress to pass a resolution formally recognizing the efforts of the Monuments Men during World War II. On the day of the resolution's passing – June 6, the 63rd anniversary of D-Day – Edsel formed the Monuments Men Foundation for the Preservation of Art, a nonprofit organization with the stated goal of "preserv[ing] the legacy of the unprecedented and heroic work of the Monuments Men". The foundation would be renamed the Monuments Men and Women Foundation in 2022. The organization worked to put together biographies of many of the over 350 Monuments Men members, most of whom had already died. Additionally, the foundation sought more information on the many still-missing pieces of art from the war, with a hotline established for people to call with any potential tips.

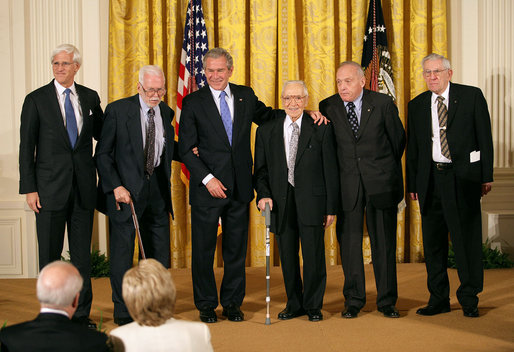
Edsel (far left) alongside members of the MFAA as they receive the National Humanities Medal from President George W. Bush

Later in 2007, the Monuments Men Foundation was a recipient of the National Humanities Medal. Edsel was assisted with the writing of The Monuments Men by Bret Witter, who also co-wrote the 2008 book Dewey: The Small-Town Library Cat Who Touched the World.

=== Publication ===
The Monuments Men was published in 2009 by Center Street. It was released in a 473-page hardback edition along with audio and e-book formats. The book reached number one on the New York Times best-seller list for combined print and e-book nonfiction following the 2014 release of the book's film adaptation.

== Synopsis ==
The Monuments Men covers the operations of the Monuments, Fine Arts, and Archives (MFAA) unit beginning with its formation as a result of the Roberts Commission in 1943. The unit became an active part of the war effort following the Allied invasion of Normandy, and was tasked with both the protection of Europe's cultural monuments during the war as well as locating and safely returning the many pieces of art stolen by the Nazis during their occupation of enemy territory. While there were around 350 people working for the MFAA by the group's end in 1951, during its early period prior to the end of hostilities there were only eight operating in Northern Europe and 27 in Italy. These members worked close to the front lines, and were frequently lacking in transportation, equipment, and accurate maps. At least two MFAA members were killed in action.

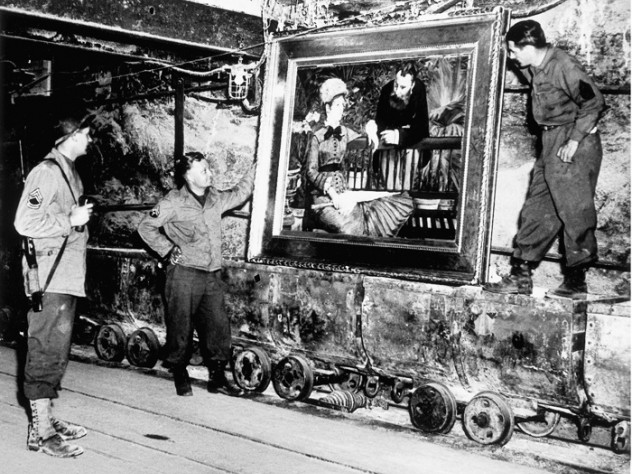
Members of the military with Manet's In the Conservatory

The members of the MFAA were primarily recruited from the art community. They were highly educated but placed into low-ranking officer positions in the military. Included in Edsel's narrative are James Rorimer, who would later become the director of the Metropolitan Museum of Art, and Lincoln Kirstein, who helped found the New York City Ballet. Edsel also details the contributions of Rose Valland, an employee of the French Jeu de Paume museum during Nazi occupation who documented the artwork being stolen by the Nazis and was instrumental in their retrieval.

The book recounts the Monuments Men's 1945 discoveries of two particularly important caches of stolen art: one in the castle of Neuschwanstein, on the German-Austrian border, where 21,000 pieces were eventually recovered, and one in the Austrian salt mines of Altaussee The latter find consisted of 6,714 paintings and sculptures, including the Ghent Altarpiece as well as the Michelangelo sculpture the Bruges Madonna. Edsel describes the group's good fortune in capturing the Altaussee cache, as leading up to its discovery a German officer had repeatedly gone against orders to blow the mine up along with all of its contents.

The MFAA was also tasked with safely returning the artwork to its rightful owners. The Bruges Madonna, for instance, was packaged for its removal from Altaussee with such care that a member of the Monuments Men stated that they could likely "bounce her from alp to alp, all the way to Munich, without doing her any harm". The MFAA eventually returned over five million pieces, including many paintings and works of sculpture but also books and scrolls, reliquaries, stained glass stolen from cathedrals, 5,000 church bells that the Nazis had planned to melt down, and more.

== Reception ==
The Monuments Men released to generally favorable reviews. In Time International, William Lee Adams wrote that "historical details come thick and fast, but Edsel manages to keep the narrative breezy". The Toronto Sun's Hans Werner called it a "gripping story" and praised Edsel's passion as well as Witter's contributions as co-writer. Writing for The Jerusalem Post, reviewer Marilyn Henry was impressed with Edsel's work in keeping the memory of the MFAA alive while detailing its members' "courage, skill, and moxie". The Boston Globe liked that the book highlighted the personalities of its subjects and called it "a difficult work to put down", while admitting that it was occasionally "overly theatrical".

Other reviewers were critical of the authors' decision to dramatize aspects of the narrative. The Associated Press's Carl Hartman warned that "statements that recall films 'based on a true story' may put some readers off". In The New Criterion, Marco Grassi called the book "compelling" but believed that a more "straightforward" approach that minimized the unnecessary inventions of dialogue and character development would have been more effective. The Evening Chronicle's Anthony Looch praised the authors' extensive research while regretting the book's "disjointed, over-the-top style".

== Film adaptation ==
In 2012, it was announced that George Clooney would be adapting The Monuments Men into a feature film directed by and starring himself. Released in 2014, the film also starred Matt Damon, Bill Murray, and John Goodman. On the review aggregator website Rotten Tomatoes, 30% of the film's 257 critics' reviews are positive. The website's consensus reads: "Its intentions are noble and its cast is impressive, but neither can compensate for The Monuments Men's stiffly nostalgic tone and curiously slack narrative." The film gave its characters different names from their real-life counterparts, and its writers received criticism for historical inaccuracies.
