= Ralph Warner Hammett =

American architect (1896–1984)

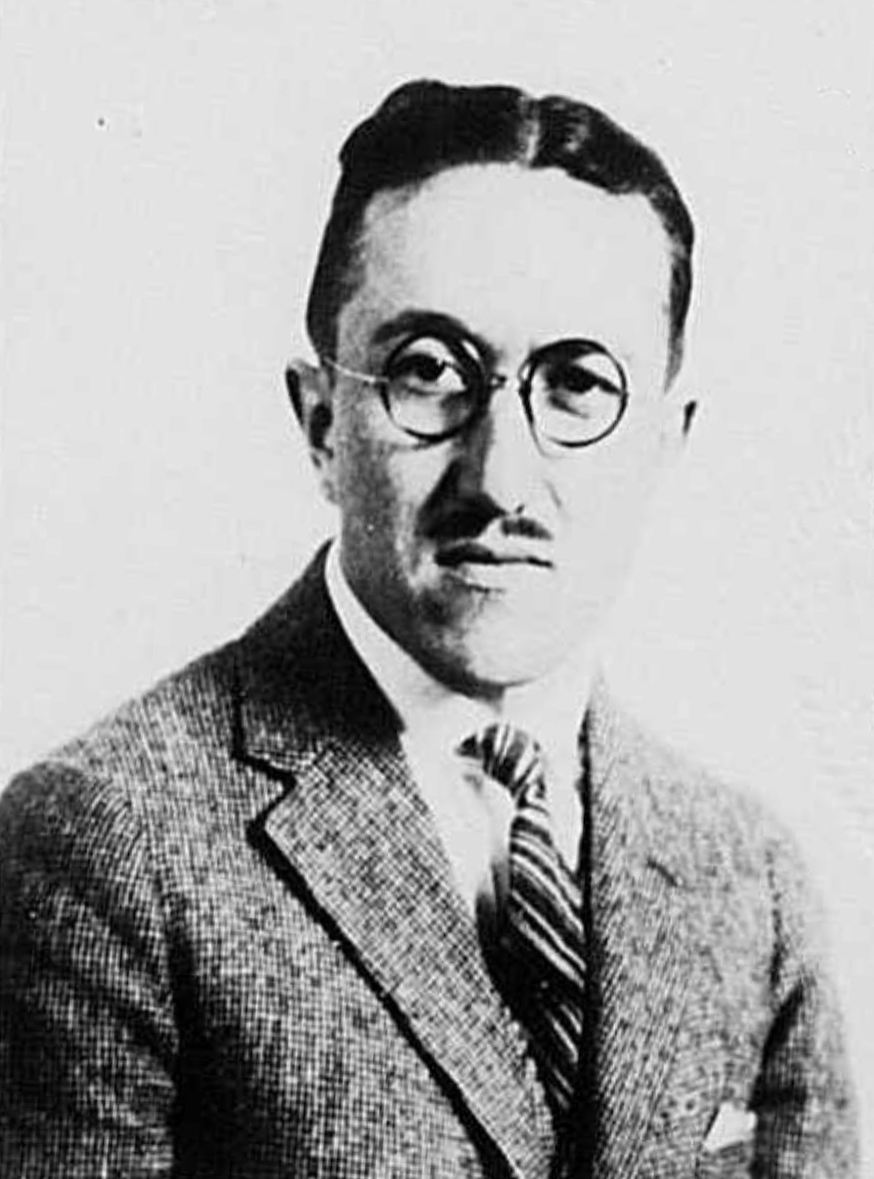
- Born: June 26, 1896; Mankato, Minnesota, U.S.
- Died: July 11, 1984 (aged 88); Rochester, Minnesota, U.S.
- Education: University of Minnesota; Harvard University
- Occupations: Architect, academic

Ralph Warner Hammett (1896–1984) was an American architect and professor. Hammett earned his first degree in architecture came from the University of Minnesota in 1919, and another in 1923 from Harvard University. At Harvard, he was awarded the prestigious Rome Prize.

After a period in academia at the University of Michigan, Hammett joined the United States Army Civil Affairs Training School at Harvard University in 1943. He enlisted in the United States Army in late August 1943, and was assigned to the European Civil Affairs Division.

In 1944, Hammett was stationed in Paris as a Monuments Officer with the Communications Zone (“Com Z”). It was during this period that he assisted in establishing a card catalogue of important European monuments arranged by location. At the same time, field reports were coming in from Monuments Men in the field and these reports were merged into Hammett's catalogue. The resulting catalog became a centralized location for the most up-to-date information on monuments and fine art available during the World War II and was central to the success of the Monuments, Fine Arts, and Archives program.

After the war, Hammett returned to academia as a professor at the University of Michigan. As an architect, Hammett designed the interior of the Abraham Lincoln Memorial in Springfield, Illinois and Courthouse Place in Chicago.

Hammett died on July 11, 1984, in Rochester, Minnesota.

A character based on Hammett was portrayed by Bill Murray in the 2014 film, The Monuments Men, which details the story of the Monuments, Fine Arts, and Archives program.
