= Bonzos =

The Bonzos was the name of some Austrian agents the British recruited to prevent the destruction of many Old Masters collected by Adolf Hitler. He planned to destroy them if he lost World War II.

== See also ==
- Monuments, Fine Arts, and Archives program
