= Rose Valland =

French art curator and resistance member (1898–1980)

- Born: Rose Antonia Maria Valland; 1 November 1898; Saint-Étienne-de-Saint-Geoirs, Isère
- Died: 18 September 1980 (aged 81)
- Citizenship: French
- Education: École nationale des beaux-arts de Lyon (1922); École nationale supérieure des beaux-arts (1925); École du Louvre (1931); University of Paris; Collège de France
- Occupation: Museum curator
- Known for: Commission for the Recovery of Works of Art
- Partner: Joyce Helen Heer (?–1977)
- Awards: Legion of Honour; Commandeur of the Order of Arts and Letters; Médaille de la Résistance; Officer's Cross of the Order of Merit; Medal of Freedom

Rose Antonia Maria Valland (1 November 1898 – 18 September 1980) was a French art curator, member of the French Resistance, captain in the French military, and one of the most decorated women in French history. She secretly recorded details of the Nazi plundering of National French and private Jewish-owned art from France. Working with the French Resistance, she saved thousands of works of art.

== Early life ==
Valland was born in Saint-Étienne-de-Saint-Geoirs, Isère, the daughter of a blacksmith. Like many gifted pupils from humble backgrounds, she received a scholarship to an école normale, a teacher school. She graduated in 1918, with the plan of becoming an art teacher. She studied art at the École nationale des beaux-arts de Lyon, graduating in 1922. Valland then topped the competitive exam for art teacher training and underwent two years of training at the École nationale supérieure des beaux-arts in Paris, graduating in 1925. She then began to study art history at the École du Louvre and the University of Paris. She also worked as a high school drawing teacher. She graduated in 1933 with a special diploma from the École du Louvre, and engaged in graduate studies at the Collège de France. In 1932, Valland became a volunteer assistant curator at the Jeu de Paume Museum.

== World War II ==
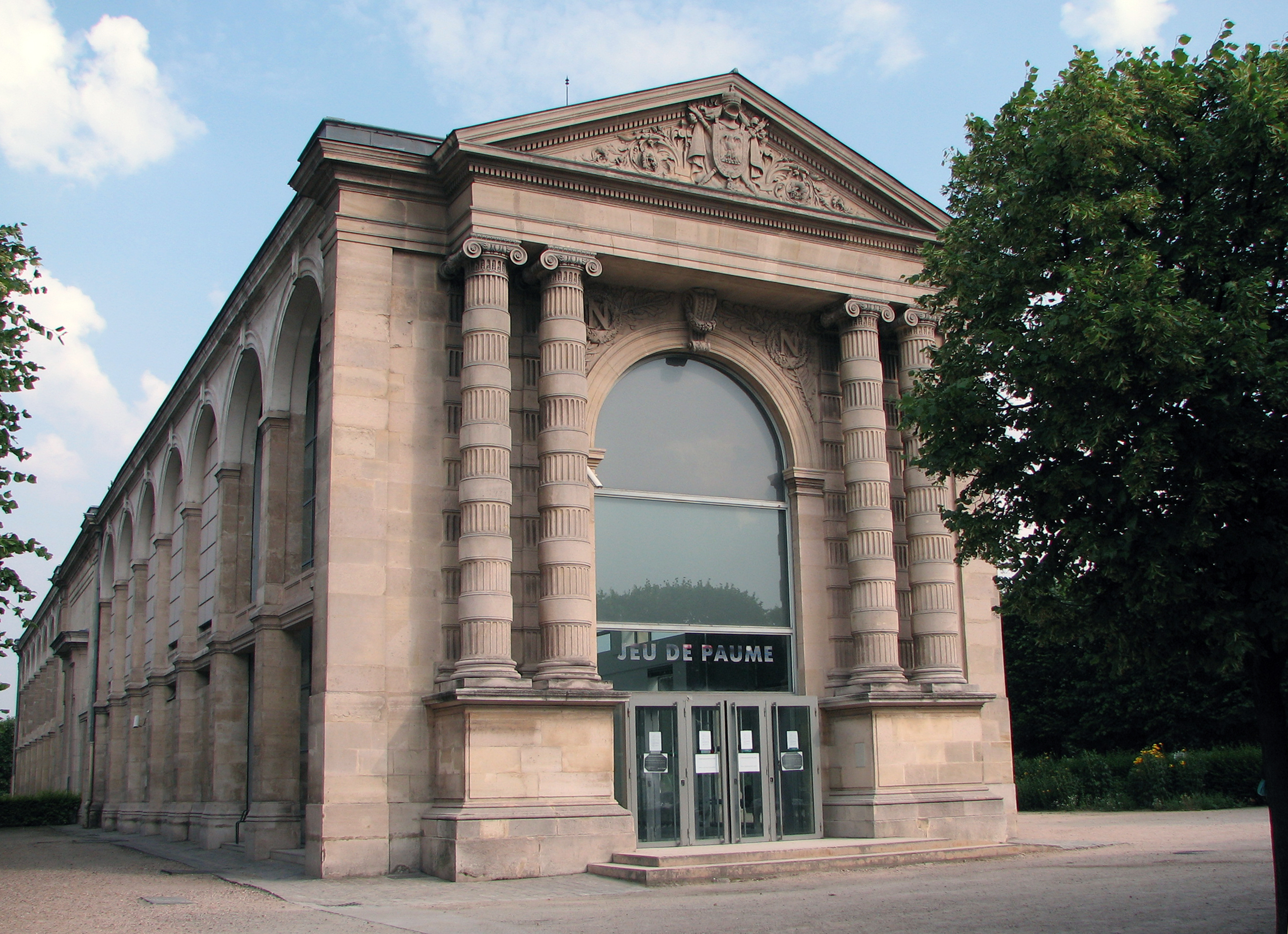
Galerie nationale du Jeu de Paume

In 1941, during World War II, Valland was put in paid service and became the overseer of the Jeu de Paume Museum at the time of the German occupation of France. Through the Sonderstab Bildende Kunst (Special Staff for Pictorial Art) of the Einsatzstab Reichsleiter Rosenberg für die besetzten Gebiete (The Reich Leader Rosenberg Institute for the Occupied Territories), or ERR, the Germans began the systematic looting of artworks from museums and private art collections throughout France. They used the Jeu de Paume Museum as their central storage and sorting depot pending distribution to various persons and places in Germany.

While the Nazi plundering was being carried out, Rose Valland began secretly recording as much as possible of the more than 20,000 pieces of art brought to the Jeu de Paume Museum. Valland kept secret from the Germans the fact that she understood German. In fact, she never formally studied the language, but her partner who knew and spoke the language, helped her understand German.

Valland would converse with truck drivers employed by the Germans, and she was thus able to learn about artwork being ransacked and taken directly to the railway stations. Valland regularly informed Jacques Jaujard, the Director of the Musėes Nationaux, about the status of Nazi art looting. In addition, for four years she kept track of where and to whom in Germany the artworks were shipped and risked her life to provide information to the French Resistance about railroad shipments of art so that they would not mistakenly blow up the trains loaded with France's priceless treasures. The museum was visited by high-ranking Nazi officials, and Valland was there when Reichsmarschall Hermann Göring came on 3 May 1941 to personally select some of the stolen paintings for his own private collection.

=== Train 40044 ===
On 1 August 1944, a few weeks before the Liberation of Paris on 25 August 1944, Valland learned that Kurt von Behr, the head of the ERR in France, was planning to remove to Germany as much artwork as he could, including many of the modern paintings which they had hitherto neglected. Valland learned that the trucks which had collected the artworks were heading to the Aubervilliers train station on the outskirts of Paris. By the 2 August 1944, 148 crates of paintings containing in total 967 paintings, including works by Braque, Cézanne, Degas, Dufy, Gauguin, Modigliani, Picasso, Toulouse-Lautrec and Utrillo had been loaded on five goods wagons waiting to be hooked up to another 48 goods wagons containing confiscated furniture and personal possessions of deported citizens. Fortunately, these other goods wagons had not yet been loaded which meant the train never left the station on schedule.

Valland was able to give Jaujard a copy of the Nazi shipment order, which listed the train and goods wagon numbers, the contents of each crate and the destination of each goods wagon (either to Kogl Castle at Sankt Georgen im Attergau in Austria or the Nikolsburg depository in Moravia.) This information Jaujard passed on to the Resistance. By 10 August, the train was ready to depart, but by then the French railway workers were on strike. However, two days later the tracks were cleared and being delayed by higher priority trains carrying fleeing Germans and their personal possessions. The train which had the designation 40044 departed, hauling a total of 53 wagons. The overloaded train reached Le Bourget before it suffered a mechanical breakdown. By the time the Germans had fixed the problem 48 hours later, the French Resistance had derailed two trains which blocked the tracks up ahead leaving the train stranded at Aulnay-sous-Bois.

Following the arrival of the Second Armored Division of the French Army in Paris, a small detachment under the command of lieutenant André Rosenberg (the son of exiled art dealer Paul Rosenberg) was sent on 27 August to check out and secure the train. After ejecting some old German soldiers who were escorting the shipment, they opened up some of the crates and found many paintings which Rosenberg had last seen hanging on the walls of his family's apartment in Paris. Finding two crates pillaged and an entire collection of silvers missing, it was arranged for 36 crates to be sent to the Louvre for safekeeping. However, to Valland's frustration, it was another two months before the remainder of the crates were removed from the train and transferred to a secure location.

== Post World War II ==
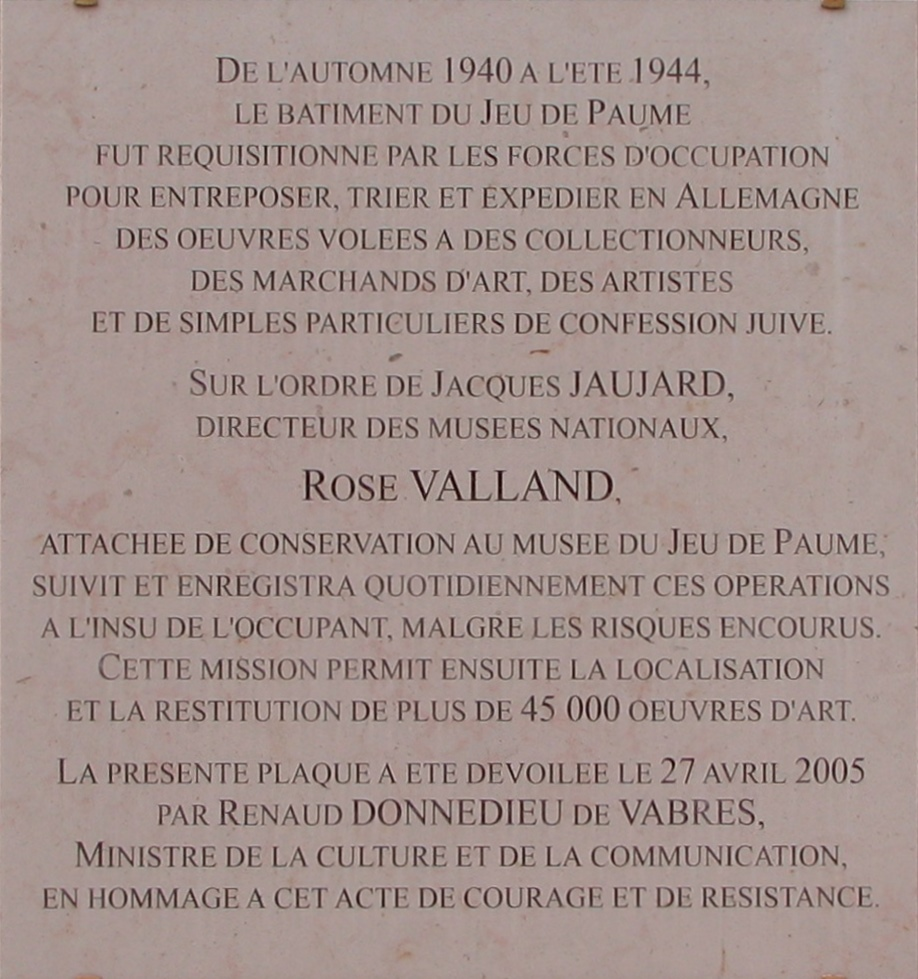
Memorial plaque at the Galerie nationale du Jeu de Paume

Following the liberation of Paris by the Allied Forces, Valland was initially arrested as a suspected Nazi collaborator, because she had been employed at Jeu de Paume. She was soon released once her conduct had been vouched for.

Trusting no one but Jaujard, she initially hesitated to share her records. After Jaujard had put her in touch with Captain James Rorimer of the Monuments, Fine Arts, and Archives program it took months of relationship building before she decided to turn over her most important records. The information Valland was able to supply led to the discovery of multiple repositories of looted art in Southern Germany, most prominently at Neuschwanstein Castle in the Bavarian Alps, where more than twenty thousand works of art and cultural objects were found. She oversaw the return of 1,400 crates of artwork from Neuschwanstein Castle direct to the Jeu de Paume. Valland's records would later assist in speeding up the return of looted artworks to their rightful owners. To assist in her efforts to locate stolen works of art and return them to France, Valland applied for and received a commission first as a lieutenant and then captain in the French First Army on 4 May 1945. She served in Germany for eight years, initially as a member of the "Commission for the Recovery of Works of Art" (Commission de Récupération Artistique) where she was the French government's liaison of the occupation zone in Germany.

Displaying initiative, Valland approached German military staff (whose names she had recorded while at the Jeu de Paume) and was able to confirm the location of several additional, previously unknown repository sites. Valland was a witness at the Nuremberg trials in February 1946 where she confronted Hermann Goering about the artworks he had stolen. In 1946 Valland was put in charge of the Fine Arts activities for the French Oversight Board where she assisted in the recovery of numerous paintings, sculptures, precious coins, and tapestries belonging to France. In a 2013 report to the French Senate, it is estimated that due to the efforts of Valland, it had been possible for the Commission de Récupération Artistique and the Allies to locate approximately 60,000 works, with three-quarters of them returned to France before 1950.

Upon her return to France in 1953, Valland was appointed a conservator of the French Musées Nationaux and in 1954 was named Chair of the Service de protection des oeuvres d'art (Commission for the Protection of Works of Art). In 1961, she wrote about her wartime experiences in a book published under the title, Le front de l'art (republished in 1997). Valland retired in 1968 but continued to work on restitution matters for the French archives. Her valor and dedication resulted in numerous awards from her own and other countries. From the French government Valland received the Legion of Honour, was made a Commandeur of the Order of Arts and Letters and was awarded the Médaille de la Résistance. In 1972, Valland received the Officer's Cross of the Order of Merit of the Federal Republic of Germany. The United States awarded Valland the Medal of Freedom in 1948.

Valland died in 1980 and was buried in her hometown of Saint-Etienne-de-Saint-Geoirs.

== Personal life ==
Valland had a relationship with Joyce Helen Heer (1917–1977), a Liverpool-born secretary-interpreter at the Embassy of the United States. The two women shared an apartment on rue de Navarre in the 5th arrondissement of Paris. The relationship ended upon Heer's death from breast cancer; she was interred in Valland's family vault.

== Legacy ==
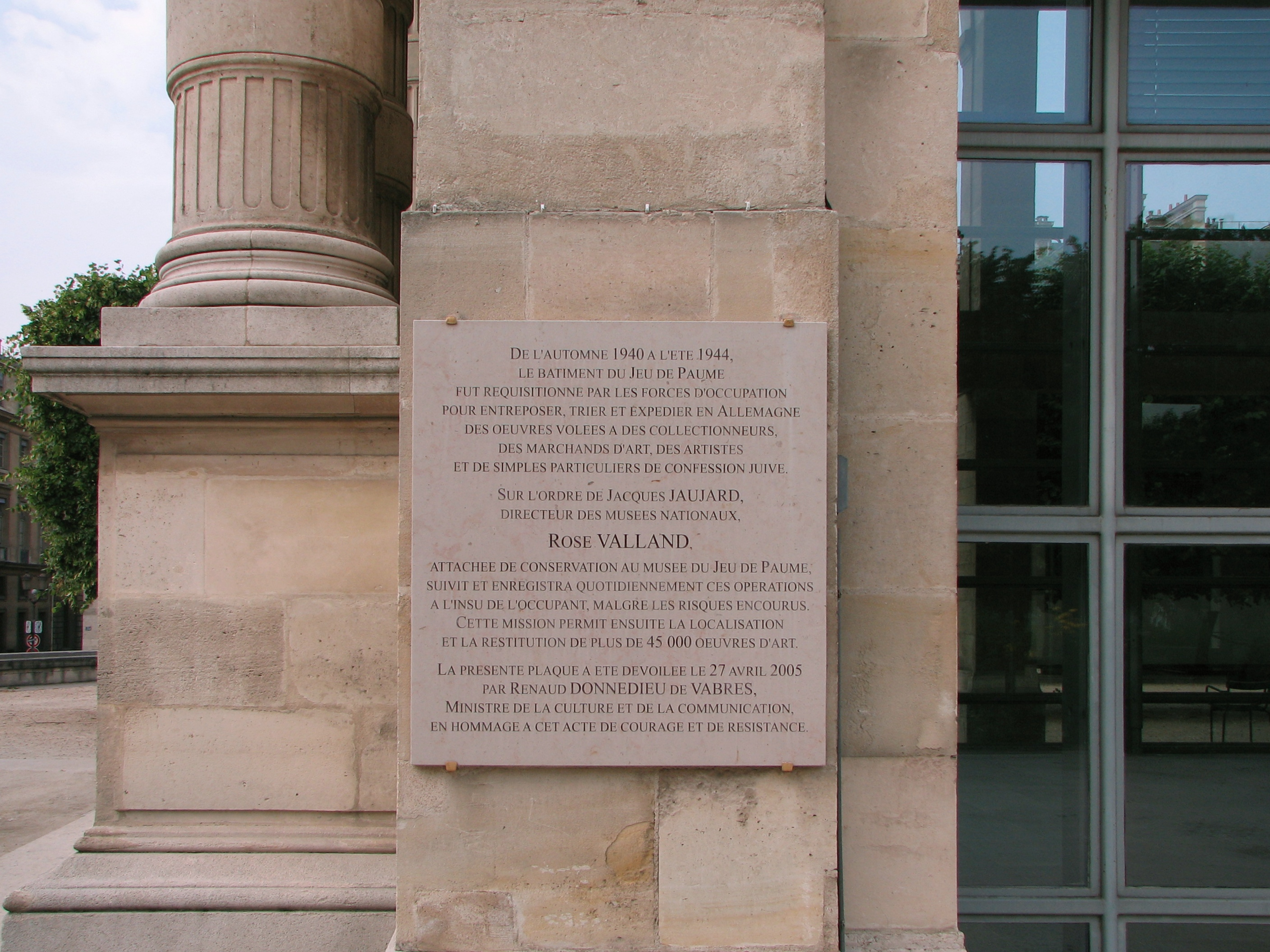
Plaque in front of the Musée du Jeu de Paume

In Paris, France, in her memory, two commemorative plaques were inaugurated: one in front of the Musée du Jeu de Paume, in the Jardin des Tuileries, and the second on the building where she lived with Joyce Heer, in the 5th arrondissement. A Parisian street is also named after her in the 17th arrondissement. Other streets are named after her in several French cities, as in Grenoble.

In 2018, the French postal service issued a stamp commemoring Valland in her memory. A rose was also named after her.

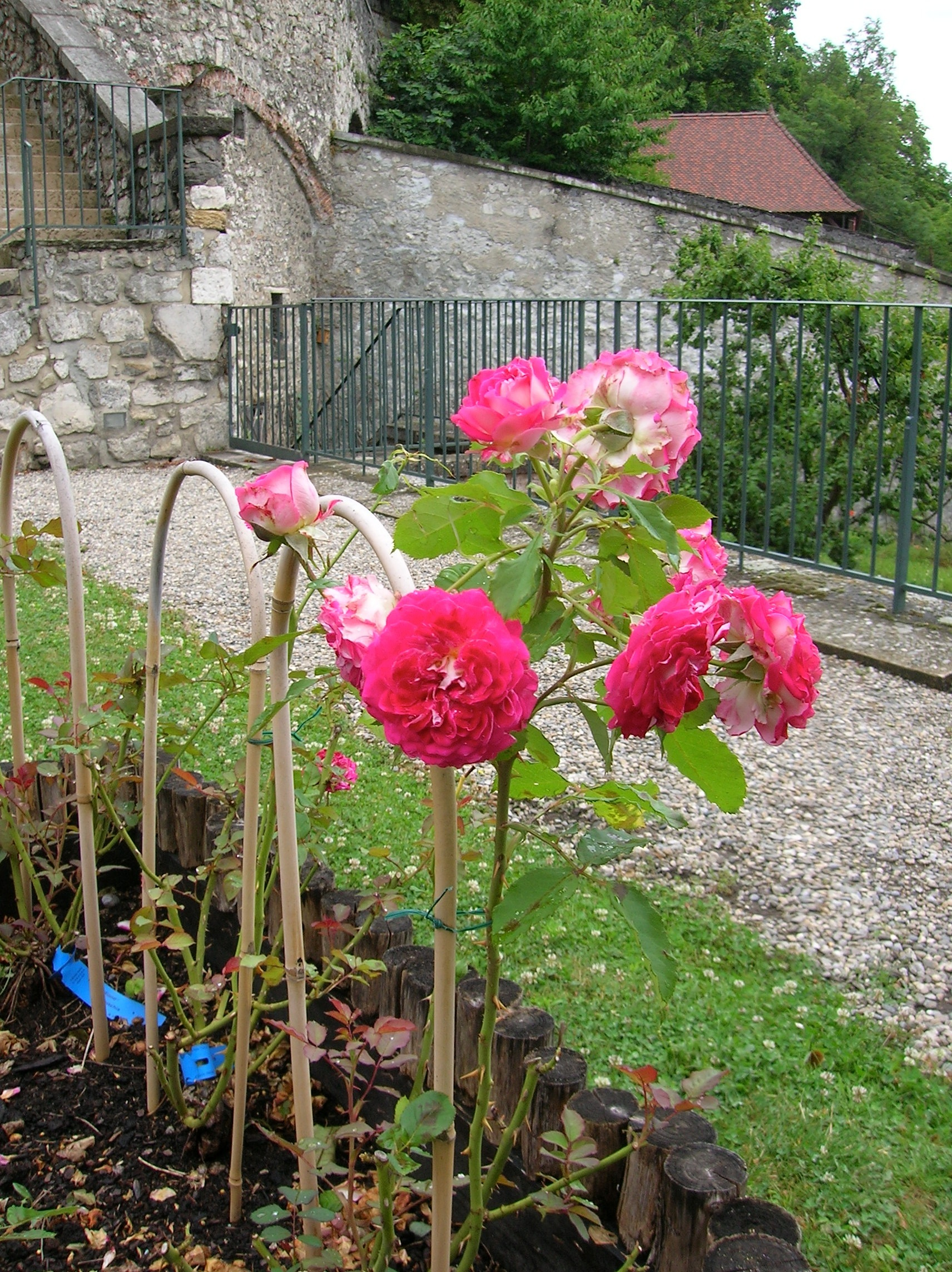
Rose in memory of Rose Valland in France

The Rose Valland Institute, an organization founded by Maria Eichhorn that specializes in tracing Nazi plunder, is named after her.

In 2003, the central square in Saint-Étienne-de-Saint-Geoirs, was renamed Place Rose Valland. The Collège Rose Valland, located at 1 rue Pierre de Coubertin in her home town, is also named in her honor. The Association de la Mémoire de Rose Valland, which was established to honor her memory, is based on Place Rose Valland in her hometown.

On the initiative of the Association de la Mémoire de Rose Valland, a commemorative plaque honoring Valland was unveiled on 25 April 2005 on the façade of the Jeu de Paume.

The French Ministry of Culture and Communication (Ministère de la Culture et de la Communication) has a web portal, called Site Rose Valland Service des musées de France, which lists recovered artworks held in French national museums.

In 2024, an English translation of Valland's memoirs, The Art Front: The Defense of French Collections 1939–1945, was published.

=== In popular culture ===
The 1964 John Frankenheimer film The Train was loosely based on her book, and includes a character named "Mlle Villard". Valland's role in preserving the stolen art was discussed as part of the 1994 book and 2006 documentary, The Rape of Europa.

In 2006, Valland was the subject of Corinne Bouchoux's biography Rose Valland: Resistance at the Museum.

In Sara Houghteling's 2009 novel, Pictures at an Exhibition, the character of Rose Clément is based on Rose Valland. In 2009 Valland was also one of the main subjects of Robert M. Edsel's book The Monuments Men. This would later serve as the basis of the 2014 George Clooney-directed film of the same name, in which Valland was the inspiration for the character of Claire Simone, portrayed by Cate Blanchett .

Michelle Young’s 2025 book The Art Spy recounts Valland’s involvement with the French Resistance and her documenting of the Nazis’ wholesale looting of French art.

== See also ==
- Monuments, Fine Arts, and Archives
- List of Monuments, Fine Arts, and Archives (MFAA) personnel
- Legion of Honour
- List of Legion of Honour recipients by name (V)
- List of foreign recipients of the Legion of Honour by country
- Legion of Honour Museum
