= Monuments Men and Women Foundation =

- Monuments Men and Women Foundation logo
- Type: Not-for-profit organization
- Industry: Cultural Preservation
- Founded: June 6, 2007
- Founder: Robert M. Edsel
- Headquarters: Dallas, Texas
- Website: monumentsmenandwomenfnd.org

The Monuments Men and Women Foundation, formerly known as the Monuments Men Foundation for the Preservation of Art, is an American IRS-approved 501(c)(3) not-for-profit organization, which honors the legacy of those who served in the Monuments, Fine Arts, and Archives program during and after World War II, more commonly known as the Monuments Men and Women. Today, the foundation continues their mission by recovering Nazi looted artworks, documents, and other cultural objects and returning them to their rightful owners. Raising public awareness is essential to the foundation's mission of "Restitution, Education and Preservation".

It was founded in 2007 by Robert M. Edsel, author of Rescuing Da Vinci, The Monuments Men: Allied Heroes, Nazi Thieves and the Greatest Treasure Hunt in History, Saving Italy: The Race to Rescue a Nation's Treasures from the Nazis, and The Greatest Treasure Hunt in History: the Story of the Monuments Men. The film The Monuments Men, scripted, directed by, and starring George Clooney, is based on Edsel's best-seller and was released in February 2014 and has been shown in over 100 countries. The film was also privately shown at the White House for members of President Barack Obama's administration.

The organization was one of the recipients of the 2007 National Humanities Medals presented by President George W. Bush. On October 22, 2015, the United States Congress presented the Monuments Men and Women with the Congressional Gold Medal. Four living members of the MFAA attended the Congressional Gold Medal ceremony, including Monuments Man Harry Ettlinger and Monuments Woman Motoko Fujishiro Huthwaite.

== History ==
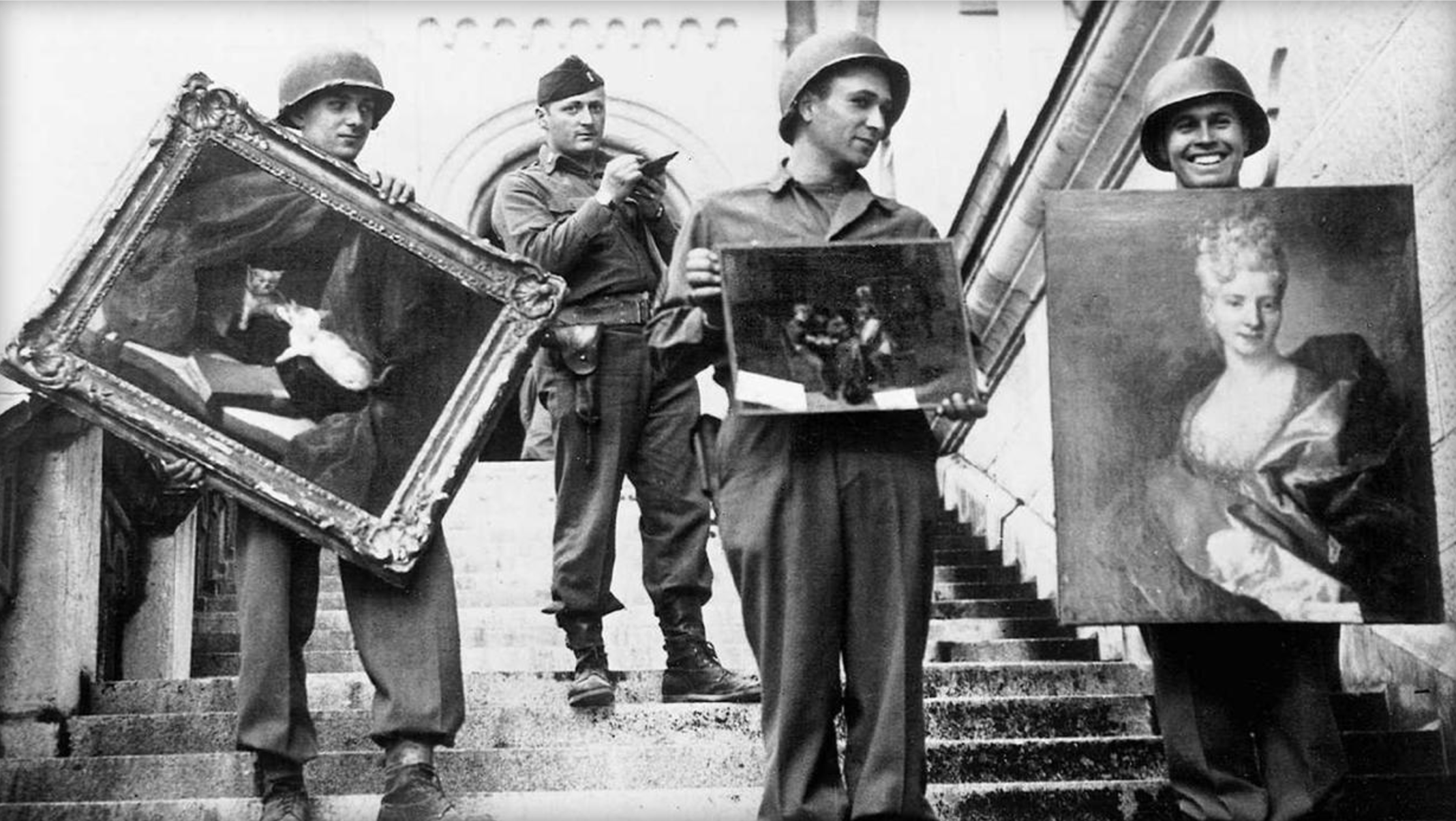
The Monuments Men outside Neuschwanstein Castle, Germany, 1945

The creation of the Monuments Men Foundation was announced by Robert M. Edsel during a ceremony on June 6, 2007, the 63rd anniversary of D-Day, that celebrated Senate and House concurrent resolutions honoring the Monuments Men.

The foundation's mission and accomplishments have received bipartisan recognition by President George W. Bush, President Barack Obama, Secretary of State Hillary Clinton, Speaker of the House John Boehner and Speaker of the House Nancy Pelosi; as well as many other members of Congress and celebrities.

Robert M. Edsel is the foundation's current chairman of the board. In November 2019, Anna Bottinelli (an alumna of the Courtauld Institute of Art and John Cabot University) was nominated the foundation's new president.

The foundation launched the Monuments Men and Women Museum Network in 2021. Participating institutions have a direct connection to a least one member of the Monuments, Fine Arts, and Archives program —known as the "monuments men and women" —and include the Isabella Stewart Gardner Museum, the Courtauld Gallery, and the Berlin State Museums.

In March 2022, the foundation announced the creation of WWII Most Wanted Art playing cards, featuring 52 works of art that are still missing today—to engage the public in the search and return of these paintings, sculptures, and other cultural objects.

In November 2024, the foundation published the first English translation of the 1961 memoir of French monuments woman Captain Rose Valland (1898–1980), The Art Front: The Defense of French Collections 1939–1945.

== Notable discoveries and returns ==
=== ERR Albums ===
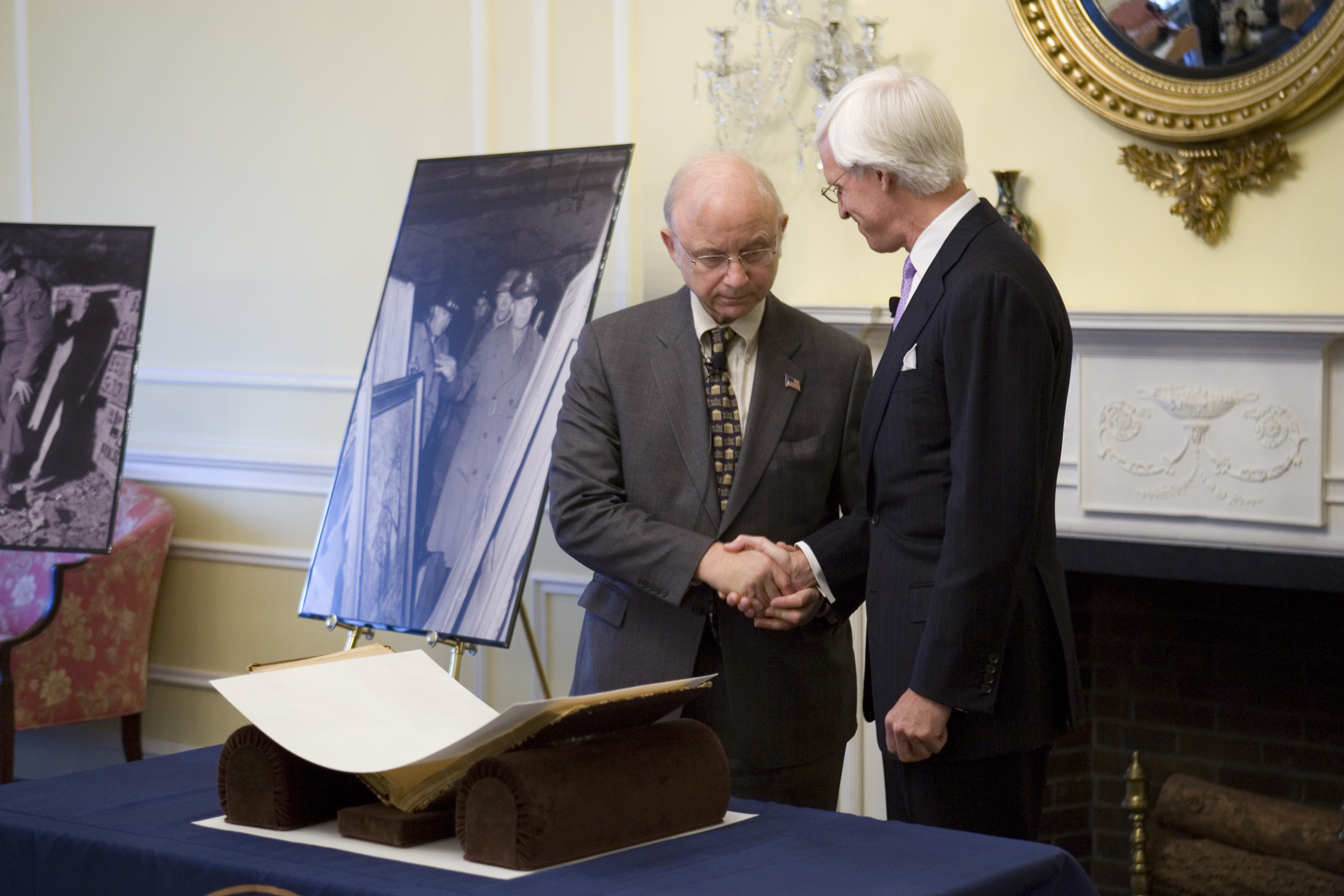
Archivist of the United States Allen Weinstein with Edsel after the donation of Nazi photograph albums

During the course of their research into the whereabouts of lost art, Edsel and the staff of the Monuments Men and Women Foundation discovered four large, leather-bound photograph albums which documented portions of the European art looted by the Nazis. The albums were in the possession of heirs to an American soldier stationed in the Berchtesgaden area of Germany, in the closing days of World War II.

The albums were created by the staff of the Third Reich's Einsatzstab Reichsleiter Rosenberg (ERR), a special unit that found and confiscated the best material in Nazi-occupied countries, to use for exploitation. In France, the ERR engaged in an extensive and elaborate art looting operation, part of Hitler's much larger premeditated scheme to steal art treasures from conquered nations. The albums were created for Hitler and high-level Nazi officials as a catalogue and, more importantly, to give Hitler a way to choose the art for his art museum, the Führermuseum, which was planned to be built in Austria. A group of these photograph albums was presented to Hitler on his birthday in 1943, to "send a ray of beauty and joy into [his] revered life". ERR staff stated that nearly 100 such volumes were created during the years of their art looting operation.

In November 2007, at a ceremony with Archivist of the United States, Allen Weinstein, Edsel announced the discovery of the first two photograph albums and, separately, donated the albums to the National Archives. Weinstein called the discovery "one of the most significant finds related to Hitler's premeditated theft of art and other cultural treasures to be found since the Nuremberg trials".

=== The Murillo Paintings ===
Based in part on the research of the foundation, it was established in 2009 that two paintings on display at Southern Methodist University's Meadows Museum, created by Spanish master Bartolomé Esteban Murillo (1618–1682) were stolen from the Rothschild family in Paris in 1941. The paintings are of Seville's two patron saints, Saint Justa and Saint Rufina, and are estimated to be worth more than US$10 million.

The foundation's research confirmed the existence of ERR cards for both paintings. ERR cards were a crucial part of the Nazi cataloguing system of looted works and are evidence that the paintings were indeed taken as part of the Third Reich's systematic looting process. The Nazi ERR code is still visible on the stretcher of Saint Justa, while it appears to have been rubbed off from the same position on the stretcher of Saint Rufina. The discovery was covered by the Dallas Morning News and other notable outlets. Edsel noted that University and museum officials had "publicly acknowledged the correct provenance of these two paintings by Murillo, and more importantly, have now, by recognizing the Nazi theft of the artwork on the museum's website, contemporaneously endorsed the 'best practices' guidelines of both the American Association of Museums (AAM) and the Association of Art Museum Directors (AAMD)."

=== Hitler's Tapestry ===
On December 16, 2016, the foundation, in conjunction with Dr Nick Mueller and the National World War II Museum, facilitated the return to Germany of a 16th-century Burgundian tapestry, referred to as "Hitler's Tapestry", that once hung in Adolf Hitler's Kehlsteinhaus or Eagle's Nest, in Berchtesgaden, Germany.

Edsel first saw the tapestry in the National World War II Museum in New Orleans, where it had been donated by Cathy Hinz, the daughter of Lt. Col. Paul Danahy of the 101st Airborne. In collaboration with the museum and Hinz, Edsel and his team established that Danahy had removed the tapestry from the Eagle's Nest and subsequently sent it home as a souvenir where it hung in the family dining room.

Further research by the foundation's team located Konrad Bernheimer, the grandson of the Jewish, Munich-based art dealer who sold the tapestry to Hitler's architect in 1938. Bernheimer told Edsel directly that he believed its sale was not forced as the full price was paid. Thomas R. Kline, a Washington D.C.-based attorney who specializes in art restitution, advised the foundation on the case and said multiple factors can go into determining if a sale was forced. Kline suggested that some Jewish gallery owners decided to sell collections for fear the Nazis would inevitably confiscate the works if they refused to sell. Since Bernheimer ultimately made no claim to the tapestry, it was returned to the Bavarian National Museum, the official heir to property once owned by Hitler, Göring, and the Nazi Party.

== Awards ==
=== National Humanities Medal ===
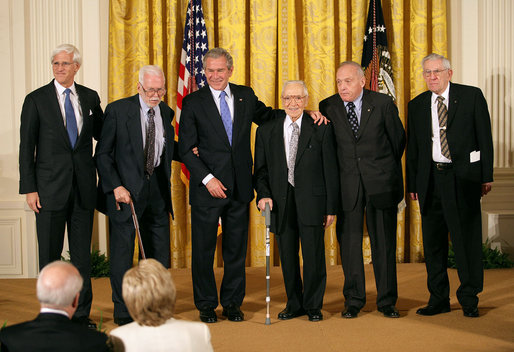
Edsel with President George W. Bush and four Monuments Men

The Monuments Men and Women Foundation is one of the recipients of the 2007 National Humanities Medals. The award cited it for "sustained efforts to recognize the contributions of the scholar-soldiers of the Second World War". The award was presented by the 43rd president of the United States, George W. Bush.

The Foundation's good work helps commemorate the Monuments Men's efforts to rescue and preserve priceless artworks during World War II.

— President George W. Bush

=== Congressional Gold Medal ===
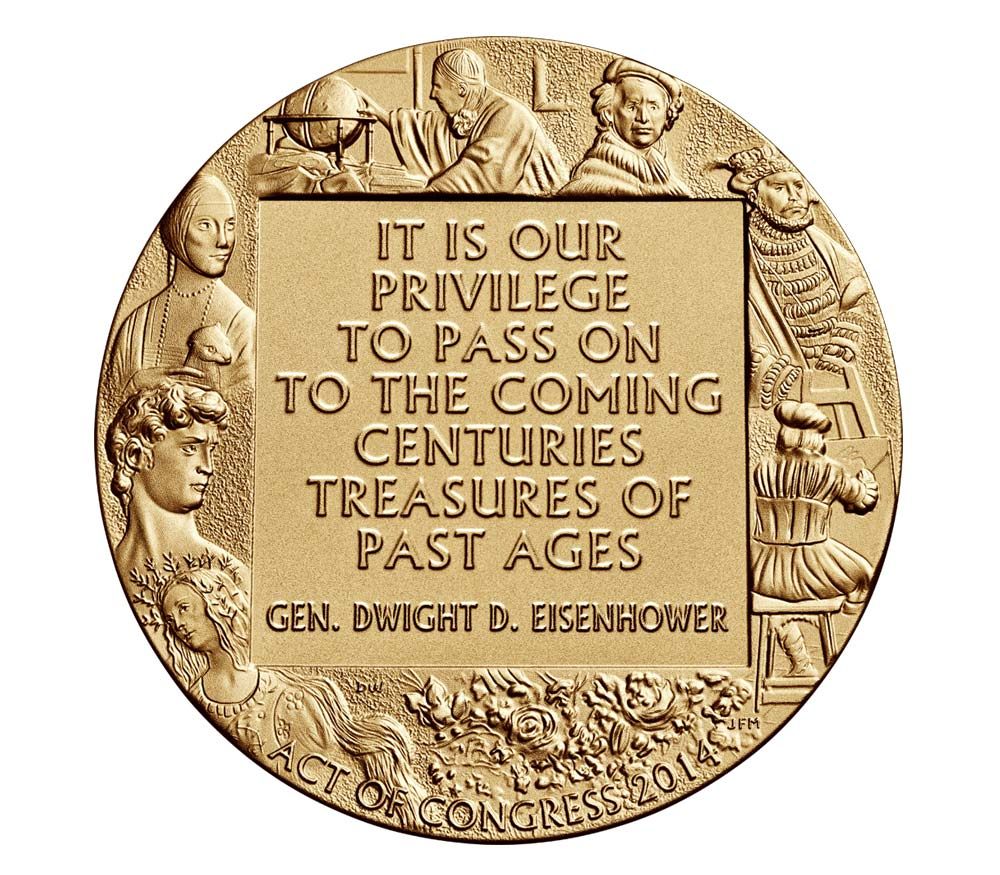
The Foundation worked with officials from the United States Mint and their team of artists on the design of the Congressional Gold Medal.

The Monuments Men and Women received the Congressional Gold Medal on October 22, 2015, after President Barack Obama signed the initial bill in June 2014. Speaker of the House, John Boehner served as the Master of Ceremony at the event which took place in Washington D.C. Additional speakers at the event included then Senate Majority Leader Mitch McConnell, Senate Minority Leader Harry Reid, House Minority Leader Nancy Pelosi, Monuments Man Harry Ettlinger, Monuments Woman Motoko Fujishiro Huthwaite and Robert M. Edsel.

The foundation worked alongside officials from the United States Mint and their team of artists on the design of the Congressional Gold Medal honouring the Monuments Men Foundation; featuring a quote from General Eisenhower.

== Monuments Men and Women Museum Network ==
The foundation launched the Monuments Men and Women Museum Network in 2021. The international network was created to recognize the pre and postwar contributions of the Monuments Men and Women, who influenced the growth and success of member institutions.

=== United States ===
- Airborne & Special Operations Museum (Fayetteville, NC)
- Albright-Knox Art Gallery (Buffalo, NY)
- Amon Carter Museum of American Art (Fort Worth, TX)
- Birmingham Museum of Art (Birmingham, AL)
- Cincinnati Art Museum (Cincinnati, OH)
- Columbus Museum of Art (Columbus, OH)
- Dallas Holocaust and Human Rights Museum (Dallas, TX)
- Dallas Museum of Art (Dallas, TX)
- Hallie Ford Museum (Salem, OR)
- Isabella Stewart Gardner Museum (Boston, MA)
- Kimbell Art Museum (Fort Worth, TX)
- MacArthur Memorial (Norfolk, VA)
- Meadows Museum (Dallas, TX)
- Newfields (Indianapolis, IN)
- The National WWII Museum (New Orleans, LA)
- Pennsylvania Academy of Fine Arts Museum (Philadelphia, PA)
- Philbrook Museum of Art (Tulsa, OK)
- Princeton University Art Museum (Princeton, NJ)
- Smith College Museum of Art (Northampton, MA)
- Toledo Museum of Art (Toledo, OH)
- Williams College Museum of Art (Williamstown, MA)

=== Europe and the United Kingdom ===
- Alte Nationalgalerie (Berlin, Germany)
- Anhaltische Gemäldegalerie Dessau (Dessau, Germany)
- Bode-Museum (Berlin, Germany)
- Courtauld Gallery (London, U.K.)
- Gemäldegalerie (Berlin, Germany)
- Neues Museum (Berlin, Germany)
- Staatliche Kunsthalle Karlsruhe (Karlsruhe, Germany)

=== Australia and New Zealand ===
- Auckland Institute and Museum (Auckland, New Zealand)

== Film ==
The 2014 film The Monuments Men is loosely based on the non-fiction book The Monuments Men by Robert Edsel and Bret Witter. It follows an Allied group from the Monuments, Fine Arts, and Archives program who are tasked with finding and saving pieces of art and other culturally important items before Nazis destroy them during World War II after the "Nero Decree". The film stars an ensemble cast including George Clooney, Matt Damon, Bill Murray, John Goodman, Jean Dujardin, Bob Balaban, Hugh Bonneville, and Cate Blanchett. A formal portrait was taken of the cast with Robert M. Edsel and Monuments Man Harry Ettlinger as part of the film's promotional material.
