= The Monuments Men =

2014 film by George Clooney

- Theatrical release poster
- Directed by: George Clooney
- Written by: George Clooney; Grant Heslov
- Based on: The Monuments Men: Allied Heroes, Nazi Thieves and the Greatest Treasure Hunt in History by: Robert M. Edsel; Bret Witter
- Produced by: George Clooney; Grant Heslov
- Starring: George Clooney; Matt Damon; Bill Murray; John Goodman; Jean Dujardin; Bob Balaban; Hugh Bonneville; Cate Blanchett
- Cinematography: Phedon Papamichael
- Edited by: Stephen Mirrione
- Music by: Alexandre Desplat
- Production companies: Columbia Pictures; Fox 2000 Pictures; Smokehouse Pictures; Studio Babelsberg
- Distributed by: Sony Pictures Releasing (United States and Canada); 20th Century Fox (International)
- Release dates: February 7, 2014 (United States); February 20, 2014 (Germany)
- Running time: 118 minutes
- Countries: Germany; United States
- Language: English
- Budget: $70–91 million
- Box office: $158.7 million

The Monuments Men is a 2014 war film directed by George Clooney, and written and produced by Clooney and Grant Heslov. The film stars an ensemble cast including Clooney, Matt Damon, Bill Murray, John Goodman, Jean Dujardin, Bob Balaban, Hugh Bonneville and Cate Blanchett.

The film is based on the 2007 non-fiction book The Monuments Men: Allied Heroes, Nazi Thieves and the Greatest Treasure Hunt in History by Robert M. Edsel and Bret Witter. It follows an Allied group from the Monuments, Fine Arts, and Archives program that is given the task of finding and saving pieces of art and other culturally important items before Nazis destroy or steal them during World War II.

The Monuments Men was co-produced by Columbia Pictures (in association with 20th Century Fox) and Babelsberg Studio. It received mixed reviews from critics and grossed $158.7 million worldwide against a $70 million budget.

== Plot ==
In 1943, the Allies are successfully pushing back the Axis powers in Italy. Frank Stokes convinces President Roosevelt that victory will be meaningless if the artistic treasures of Western civilization are lost and is directed to assemble an Army unit of museum directors, curators, art historians, and an architect. The "Monuments Men" will guide Allied units in the search for stolen art so it can be returned to the rightful owners.

In July 1944, the Allies are ashore in France and Claire Simone, a French curator, has been forced to assist German officer Viktor Stahl in the theft of art which goes to Adolf Hitler's Führermuseum or other Nazi officials such as Hermann Göring. She confronts Stahl at a railyard after learning her gallery's collection has been loaded on a train for Germany, to no avail.

Stokes' unit finds its work frustrated by Allied officers who refuse to endanger their troops for the sake of his mission. The unit splits up to cover more ground, with varying degrees of success. James Granger meets Simone, but she refuses to cooperate, suspecting the Americans want to confiscate the stolen art for themselves. British officer Donald Jeffries is killed sneaking into occupied Bruges to save Michelangelo's Madonna of Bruges. Richard Campbell and Preston Savitz learn that Van Eyck's Ghent Altarpiece, removed by the priests of Ghent Cathedral for safekeeping, was stolen during transit. Viktor Stahl, hiding as a farmer, is arrested when they identify the paintings in his house as stolen masterpieces from the Rothschild Collection. In December 1944, Walter Garfield and Jean Claude Clermont blunder into a firefight in the countryside. Garfield is unable to find medical help for a wounded Clermont, who dies.

Simone agrees to help after Granger shows her the German Nero Decree ordering widespread destruction in the event of German collapse. She witnesses the Monuments Men return a looted painting to a Jewish family, and provides a comprehensive listing of stolen art and the rightful owners. The team learns of artwork hidden in mines and castles, such as Neuschwanstein, but realizes they are competing with Soviet forces who are also seizing artwork from its occupation zone of Germany as war reparations. Colonel Wegner is also systematically destroying entire art caches.

The team's successes include discovery of a mine hiding over 16,000 art pieces and discovery of the German national treasury's entire gold reserve. As the war ends in May 1945, the team finds another mine in Austria that appears to have been demolished. Racing to beat the Soviets, they find the entrances blocked by the locals to prevent the Nazis from destroying the contents. The team evacuates sculptures, the Ghent Altarpiece, and the Madonna of Bruges, but are unable to retrieve the entire collection before the Soviets arrive.

Stokes reports to President Truman that the team recovered vast quantities of artwork and culturally significant items and requests to stay in Europe to oversee further searching and restoration. When Truman asks Stokes if his efforts were worth the lives of the men he lost, he says they were. Truman then asks if in thirty years anyone will remember those men died for a piece of art. The elderly Stokes, showing his grandson the Madonna of Bruges in 1977, says "Yeah."

== Cast ==
- George Clooney as Lieutenant Frank Stokes, loosely based on George L. Stout
  - Nick Clooney plays an aged Stokes
- Matt Damon as Lieutenant James Granger, loosely based on James Rorimer
- Bill Murray as Sergeant Richard Campbell, loosely based on Ralph Warner Hammett and Robert K. Posey
- John Goodman as Sergeant Walter Garfield, loosely based on Walker Hancock
- Jean Dujardin as 2nd Lieutenant Jean-Claude Clermont
- Bob Balaban as Private Preston Savitz, loosely based on Lincoln Kirstein
- Hugh Bonneville as 2nd Lieutenant Donald Jeffries, loosely based on Ronald E. Balfour
- Cate Blanchett as Claire Simone, loosely based on Rose Valland
- Serge Hazanavicius as René Armand, loosely based on Jacques Jaujard
- Sam Hazeldine as Colonel Langton
- Dimitri Leonidas as Private Sam Epstein, loosely based on Harry L. Ettlinger
- Grant Heslov as the Army Field Surgeon
- Miles Jupp as Major Fielding
- Justus von Dohnányi as Viktor Stahl, loosely based on Kurt von Behr
- Holger Handtke as Colonel Wegner
- Zahari Baharov as Major Elya, a Red Army officer tasked with finding artworks stolen by the Nazis.
- Buddy Elias as Agent Ute Nicolai
- Michael Brandner as Dentist

== Production ==
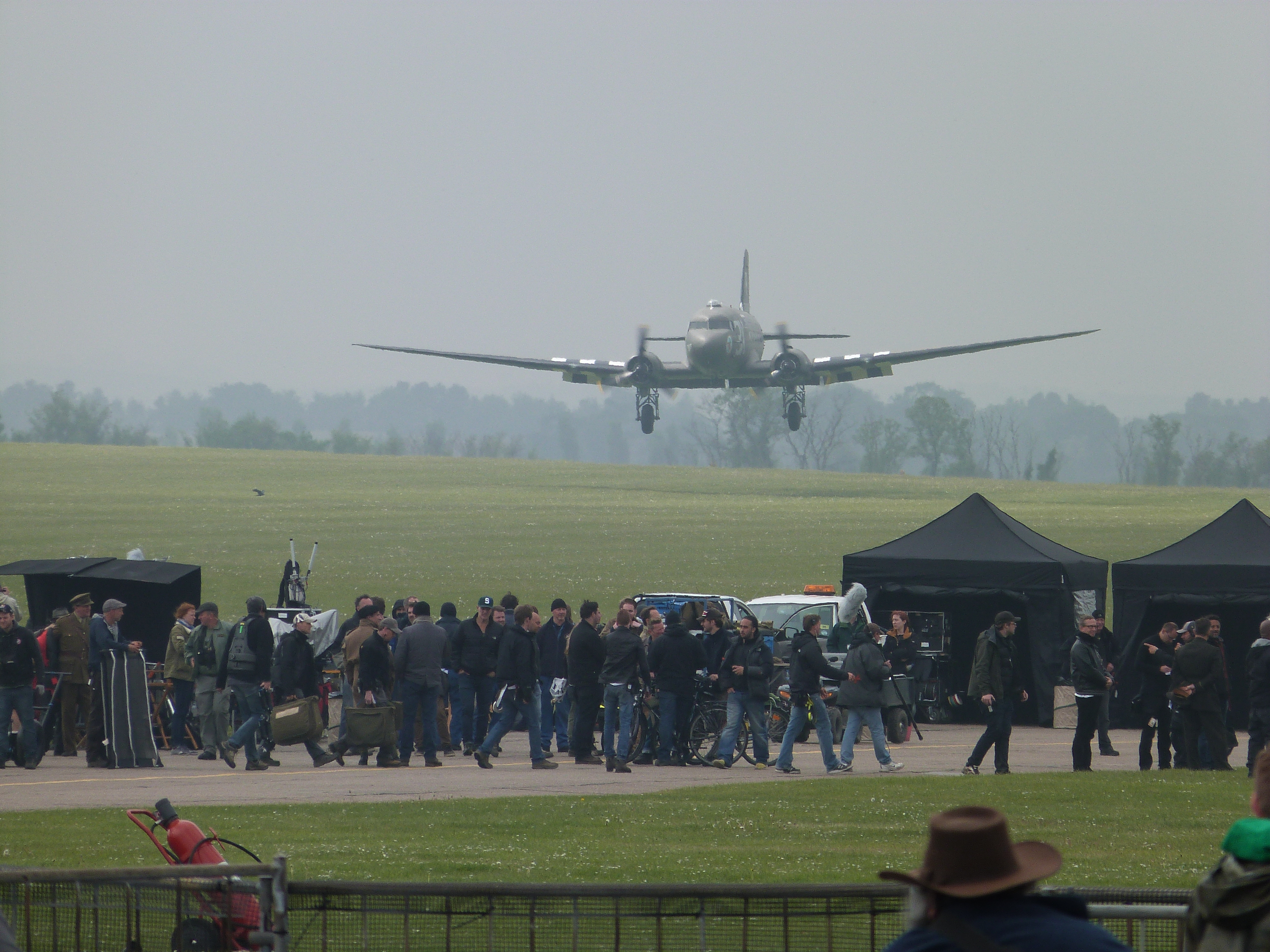
Douglas C-47 Skytrain landing at Duxford Air Field during filming at Imperial War Museum Duxford

=== Development ===
A co-production between Columbia Pictures (in association with 20th Century Fox) and Germany's Studio Babelsberg, the film was funded by the German Federal Film Fund (DFFF) with €8.5 million, Mitteldeutsche Medienförderung, Medienboard Berlin-Brandenburg as well as Medien- und Filmgesellschaft Baden-Württemberg. Casting was held in February 2013 for thousands of extras for the military scenes.

=== Filming ===
Principal photography began in early March 2013, at the Babelsberg Studios in Potsdam, Germany, in the Berlin-Brandenburg region, and the Harz. The mines around Bad Grund, particularly the Wiemannsbucht and the Grube Hilfe Gottes, were used in the filming of outdoor scenes. Other outdoor locations were the towns of Lautenthal, Clausthal-Zellerfeld, Goslar, Halberstadt, Merseburg and Osterwieck. Some of the scenes, including flights and American war base footage, were filmed at Imperial War Museum Duxford, Cambridgeshire, UK. A farm in Ashford in Kent was also used. Filming was scheduled to last until the end of June 2013, wrapping up in Rye, East Sussex.

== Release ==
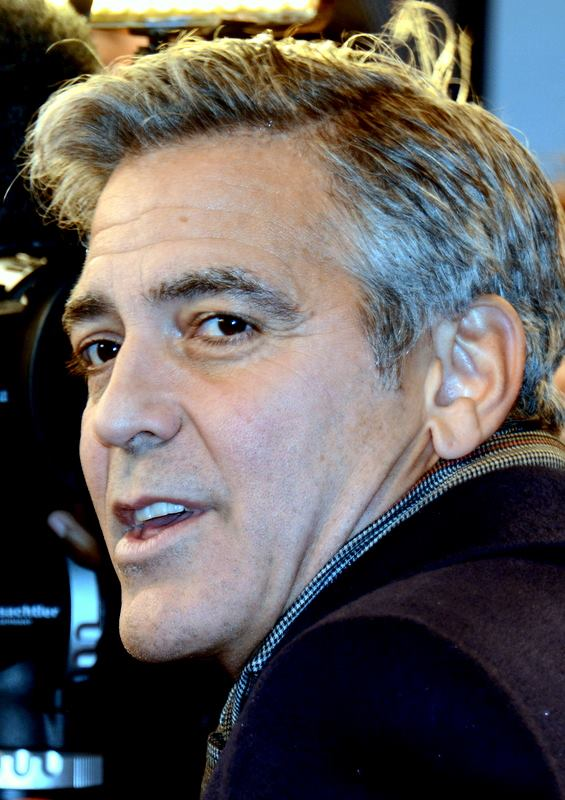
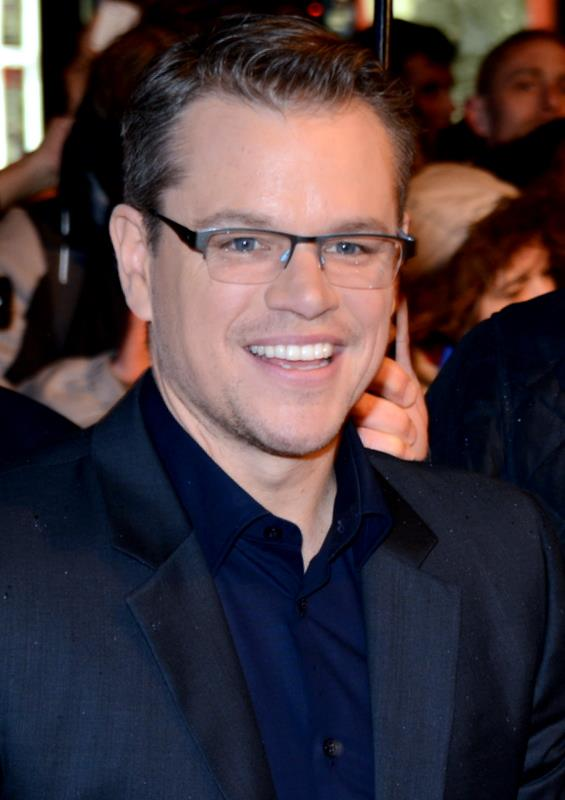
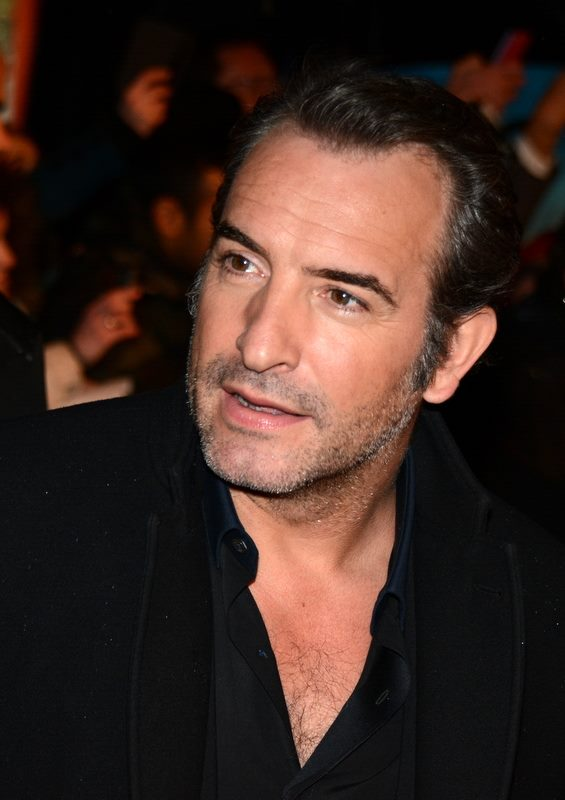
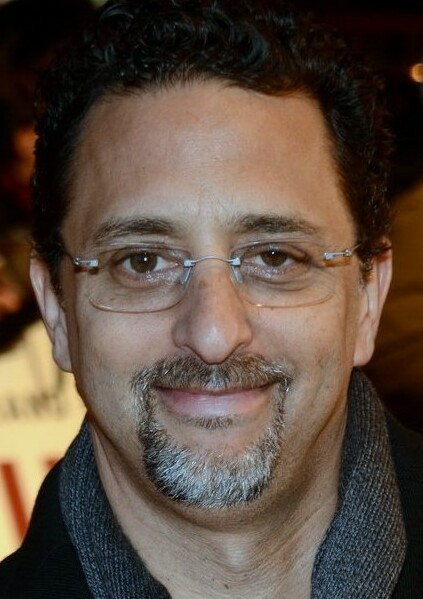
George Clooney, Matt Damon, Jean Dujardin and producer Grant Heslov in Paris at the film's French premiere, February 2014

The film was originally set to be released on December 18, 2013, and a trailer was released on August 8, 2013. The release was pushed back to February 2014, because issues balancing humor with the serious nature of the subject matter caused post-production to take longer than expected.

The film was screened on February 7, 2014, at the 64th Berlin International Film Festival. It was also screened at UNESCO, on 27 March 2014, on the occasion of the panel discussion "Modern Day Monuments Men and Women" on the preservation of heritage in times of conflict and the fight against the illicit trafficking of cultural property.

== Critical response ==
The Monuments Men received mixed reviews from film critics. On review aggregator Rotten Tomatoes, the film has a 30% approval rating, based on 257 reviews. The website's critical consensus reads: "Its intentions are noble and its cast is impressive, but neither can compensate for The Monuments Men's stiffly nostalgic tone and curiously slack narrative." On Metacritic, the film has a weighted average score of 52 out of 100, based on reviews from 43 critics, indicating "mixed or average reviews". Audiences surveyed by CinemaScore gave the film a grade "B+" on scale of A to F.

Peter Travers in Rolling Stone gave it three out of four stars, noting that while some of the dialogue and emotions seemed inauthentic, the physical production and cinematography were "exquisite", with shooting done on locations in Germany and England. In comparing the film with contemporary ones, he considered it a "proudly untrendy, uncynical movie," where the story involved people seeking something more valuable than money. He added, "Clooney [as director] feels there's much to be learned from these unsung art warriors...The Monuments Men is a movie about aspiration, about culture at risk, about things worth fighting for. I'd call that timely and well worth a salute." He also wrote that the film contains "a tone shift that may leave escapism junkies feeling betrayed."

Richard Roeper from the Chicago Sun-Times called the film an "...engaging, shamelessly corny and entertaining World War II adventure inspired by true events"; he gave it 3 out of 4. Richard Corliss from Time stated that "...[r]ather than juicing each element to blockbuster volume, Clooney has delivered it in the tone of a memorial lecture, warm and ambling, given by one of the distinguished academics he put in his movie."

== Historical accuracy ==
The film is based on real events, but the names of all characters were changed, and a number of further adjustments were made to the historical facts in the interests of drama. According to Clooney, "80 percent of the story is still completely true and accurate, and almost all of the scenes happened". The accounts of some events were altered to serve the film's dramatic portrayal of the retrieval of these treasures.

During the Nazi period, a huge number of European art treasures pillaged by the Germans had been stored in the Altaussee salt mine near the town of Bad Aussee. In the film, it is stated that 'local miners' had blown up the mine to prevent the contents being destroyed. In 1945 a British Special Operations Executive mission, codenamed Bonzos and led by Albrecht Gaiswinkler, was responsible for saving the looted art stored in Austrian salt mines. These personnel had been parachuted into the Aussee area, where Gaiswinkler raised a force of around 300 men, armed them with captured German weapons, and spent the last weeks and months of the war harassing local German forces. When the Americans arrived, his information helped them capture several prominent Nazis. He and his colleagues had captured the salt mine, prevented the destruction of the artworks held there, and were able to hand over "a number of Nazi treasure hoards, including a good copy of the Mona Lisa (which is subject of debate) and the Austrian Imperial Crown Jewels". Other artworks rescued included Hubert and Jan van Eyck's Ghent Altarpiece.

Nigel Pollard of Swansea University was critical of the lack of historical accuracy, and wrote: "There's a kernel of history there, but The Monuments Men plays fast and loose with it in ways that are probably necessary to make the story work as a film, but the viewer ends up with a fairly confused notion of what the organisation Monuments, Fine Arts, and Archives program (MFAA) was, and what it achieved. The real organisation was never a big one (a few dozen officers at most), but the film reduces it to just seven men to personalise the hunt for the looted art: five Americans, one British officer, the first to be killed off (Hugh Bonneville), and a Free French officer, marginalising the British role in the establishment of the organisation. This is presented as set up at Clooney's [Stokes'] initiative after the bombing of Monte Cassino (so, after February 1944). In fact, its origins actually went back to British efforts in Libya in 1942, and it already existed (albeit with teething troubles) when the Allies invaded Sicily in July 1943." Historian Alex von Tunzelmann, noted several historical faults and said of the plot: "If you're getting the sense that the film is episodic and poorly structured, unfortunately you'd be right", and "There are far too many characters, so the screenplay splits them up into little groups and sends them off on various errands. Some of these are more exciting than others – but they do not add up to a satisfying plot. A TV series might have been a better vehicle for the "monuments men" stories than a feature film... The story is fascinating, but this film's good intentions are hampered by its lack of pace, direction, tone and properly fleshed-out characters."

== See also ==
- Rescuing Da Vinci (2006 book)
- The Rape of Europa (1994 book and 2006 documentary film)
- The Train (1964 film)
- The Hessen Affair (2009 film)
- Woman in Gold (2015 film)
