= Kirstein Building =

Historic commercial building in New York, United States

- U.S. National Register of Historic Places
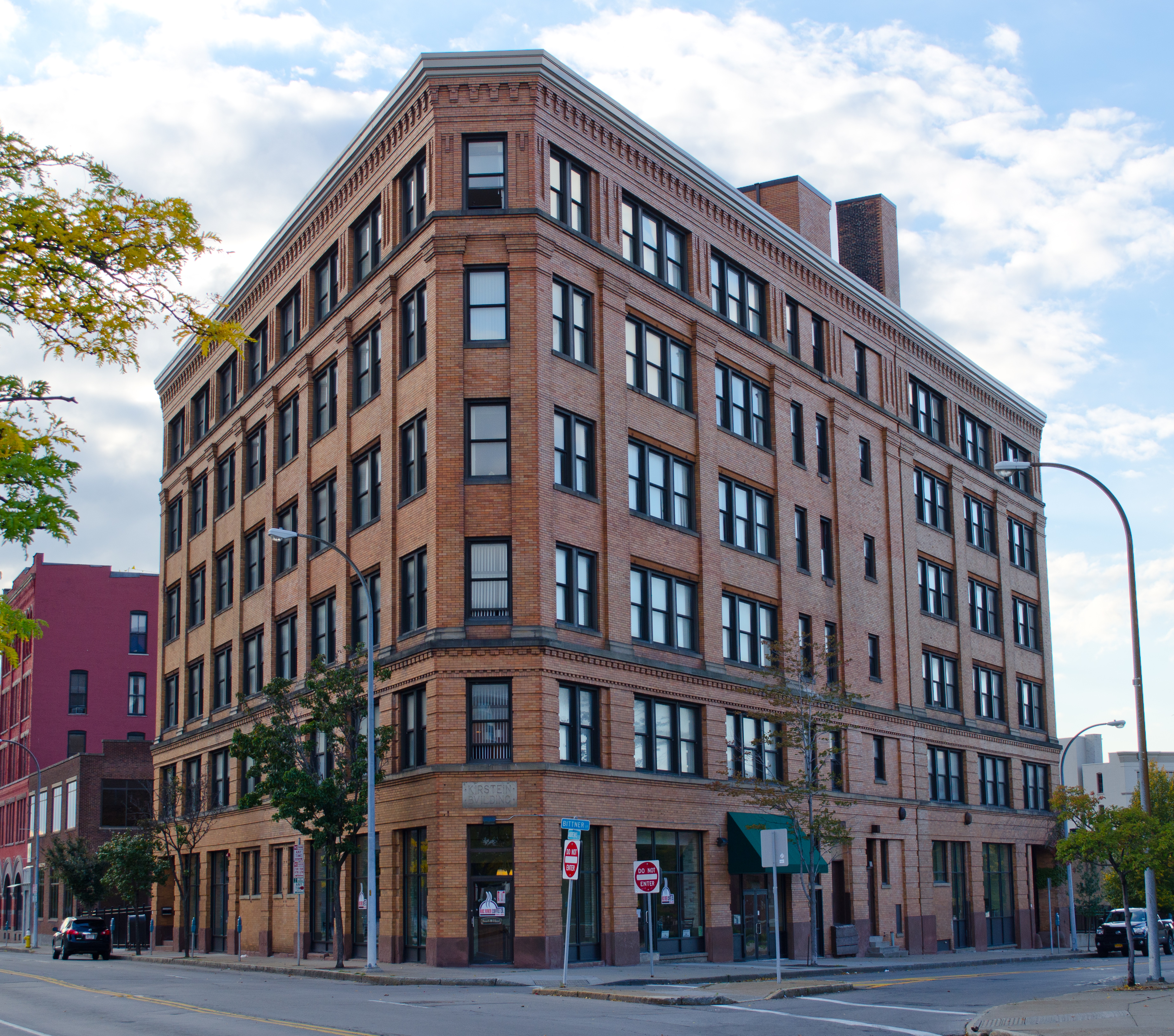
- Kirstein Building, October 2006

- Location within New York Location within the United States
- Location: 242 Andrews St., Rochester, New York
- Coordinates: 43°9′36″N 77°36′28″W
- Area: less than one acre
- Built: 1908
- Architectural style: Classical Revival
- MPS: Inner Loop MRA
- NRHP reference No.: 85002844
- Added to NRHP: October 04, 1985

The Kirstein Building is a historic industrial and commercial building located in Rochester in Monroe County, New York. It is a six-story, large triangular yellow brick structure with Classical Revival details. It was built in 1908 for E. Kirstein and Sons, Co., later Shuron Optical Company, a manufacturer of optical products. The company continued to use the building for offices and production until 1965.

It was listed on the National Register of Historic Places on October 4, 1985.
