= Robert M. Edsel =

American businessman and author

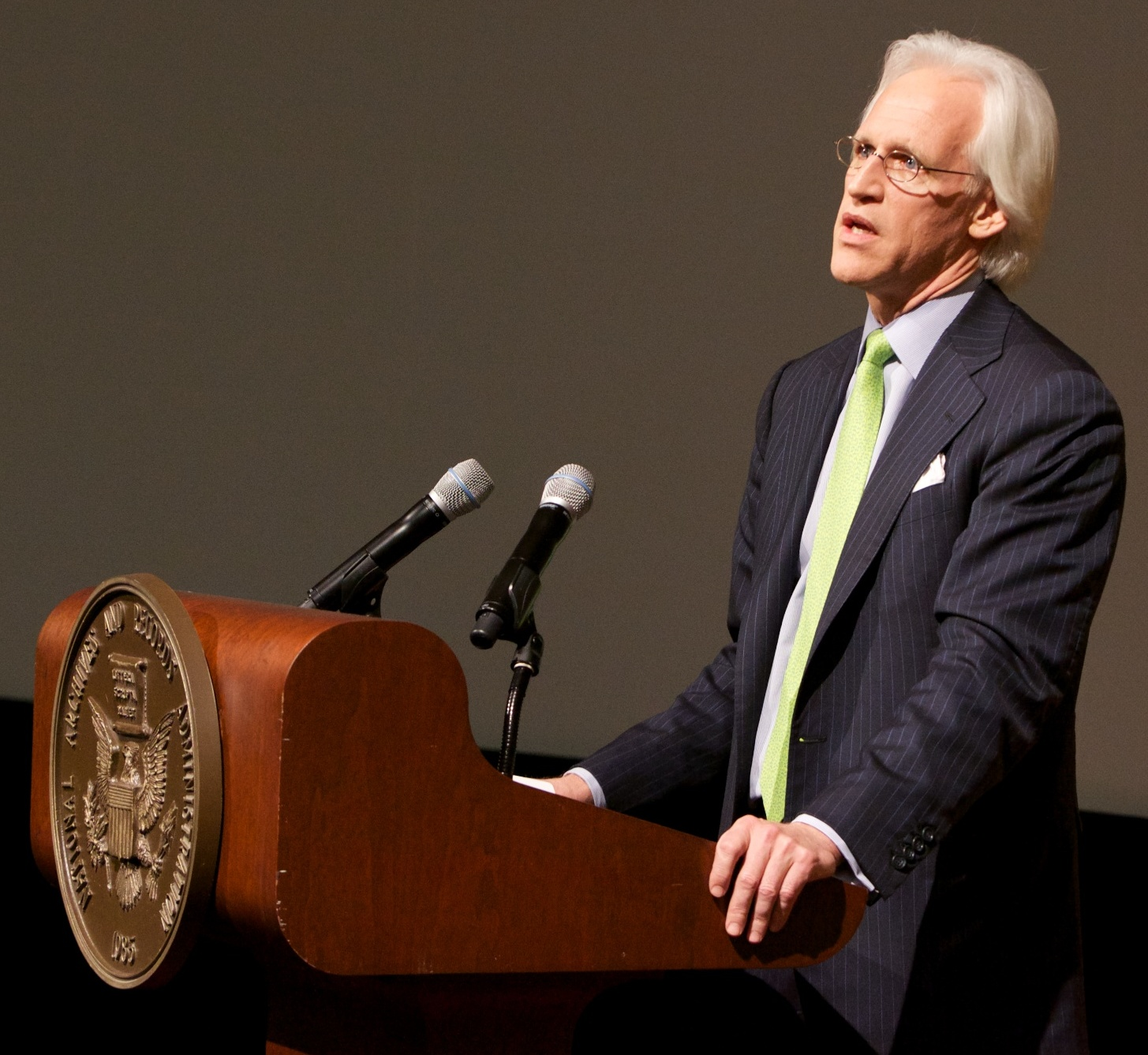
- Born: December 28, 1956 (age 69); Oak Park, Illinois, United States
- Notable work: The Monuments Men: Allied Heroes, Nazi Thieves and the Greatest Treasure Hunt in History; Saving Italy: The Race to Rescue a Nation's Treasures from the Nazis
- Parent(s): Norma Louise (née Morse); Alpha Ray Edsel
- Website: www.robertedsel.com

Robert Morse Edsel (born December 28, 1956) is an American businessman and author. He has written five non-fiction books: Rescuing Da Vinci (2006); The Monuments Men (2007); Saving Italy (2013); The Greatest Treasure Hunt in History (2019); and Remember Us (2025). A film based on his book, The Monuments Men, directed by and starring George Clooney, was released in February 2014.

Edsel is the co-producer of the documentary film, The Rape of Europa (2007). He is also founder and chairman of the Monuments Men and Women Foundation for the Preservation of Art, which received the 2007 National Humanities Medal under President George W. Bush. The foundation has donated four albums of photographic evidence of the Third Reich's theft of art treasures to the United States National Archives.

== Early life and education ==
Robert M. Edsel was born in 1956, in Oak Park, Illinois, and raised in Dallas, Texas. He is the son of Norma Louise (née Morse), a housewife, and Alpha Ray Edsel, a stockbroker. Edsel was formerly a nationally ranked tennis player.

In 1981, he began his business career in oil and gas exploration. His company, Gemini Exploration, pioneered the use of horizontal drilling technology throughout the early 1990s. By 1995, Gemini had become the second most active driller of horizontal wells in the United States. Edsel sold the company’s assets to Union Pacific Resources Company, and the following year, he moved to Europe with his family.

In the late 1990s, while living in Florence, Edsel began to think about the methods and planning used to keep art out of the hands of Adolf Hitler and Nazi Germany. Following a divorce in 2000, Edsel moved to New York City, where he began a serious effort to learn about and understand the issue.

By 2004, those efforts had become a full-time career, and he established a research office in Dallas, his hometown. By 2005, he had gathered thousands of photographs and other documents, and began writing the manuscript for Rescuing Da Vinci, which was published in 2006. The book received wide attention.

In September 2009, Edsel’s second book, The Monuments Men: Allied Heroes, Nazi Thieves and the Greatest Treasure Hunt in History, a narrative account of the Monuments Men, was published by Center Street, a division of Hachette Book Group. The book has been translated and published in more than 25 languages. George Clooney wrote, directed and starred in a movie of the same name based on Edsel's book, The Monuments Men (2014).

Edsel's third book, Saving Italy: The Race to Rescue a Nation's Treasures from the Nazis (2013), was published by W. W. Norton and debuted on the New York Times bestseller list. Saving Italy tells the dramatic story of the Monuments Men's efforts to locate and recover that country’s innumerable art treasures that had been stolen by the Nazis. Beginning with the near destruction of Leonardo da Vinci’s The Last Supper by British bombing, Edsel introduces a major but largely overlooked Nazi figure, SS General Karl Wolff. Edsel describes Wolff's harrowing negotiations with OSS leader Allen Dulles, America’s senior spy in Europe, related to the artworks and preserving Paris after the Nazis' retreat.

In 2025, Edsel's fifth book, Remember Us: American Sacrifice, Dutch Freedom, and a Forever Promise Forged in World War II, was released by Harper Collins Horizon.

Edsel co-produced a documentary film, The Rape of Europa (2007), based on Lynn Nicholas' eponymous book. Narrated by Joan Allen, the film was well received by critics and began a theatrical run in September 2007 at the Paris Theatre in New York City. In addition, Edsel has created The Greatest Theft in History educational program.

== Monuments Men Foundation ==
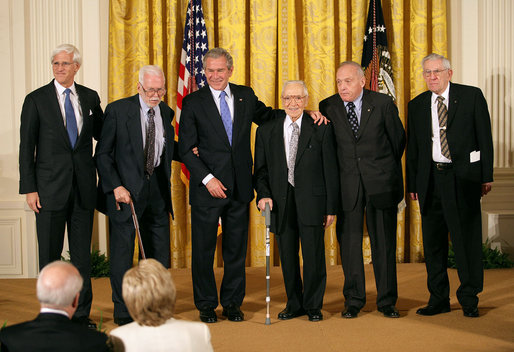
Edsel with President George W. Bush and four Monuments Men.

In 2007, Edsel created the Monuments Men Foundation for the Preservation of Art. The foundation's mission is "to preserve the legacy of the unprecedented and heroic work of the men and women who served in the Monuments, Fine Arts, and Archives (“MFAA”) section, known as “Monuments Men,” during World War II, by raising public awareness of the importance of protecting and safeguarding civilization’s most important artistic and cultural treasures from armed conflict, but incorporating these expressions of man's greatest creative achievements into our daily lives." He announced the foundation's creation during a ceremony on June 6, 2007, the 63rd anniversary of D-Day, to celebrate Senate and House concurrent resolutions honoring the Monuments Men.

The Monuments Men Foundation was one of ten recipients of the 2007 National Humanities Medal, an honor which was presented by President Bush during a ceremony held in the East Room of The White House on November 15, 2007. The National Humanities Medal is the highest honor given for excellence in the Humanities field.

== Photograph albums ==
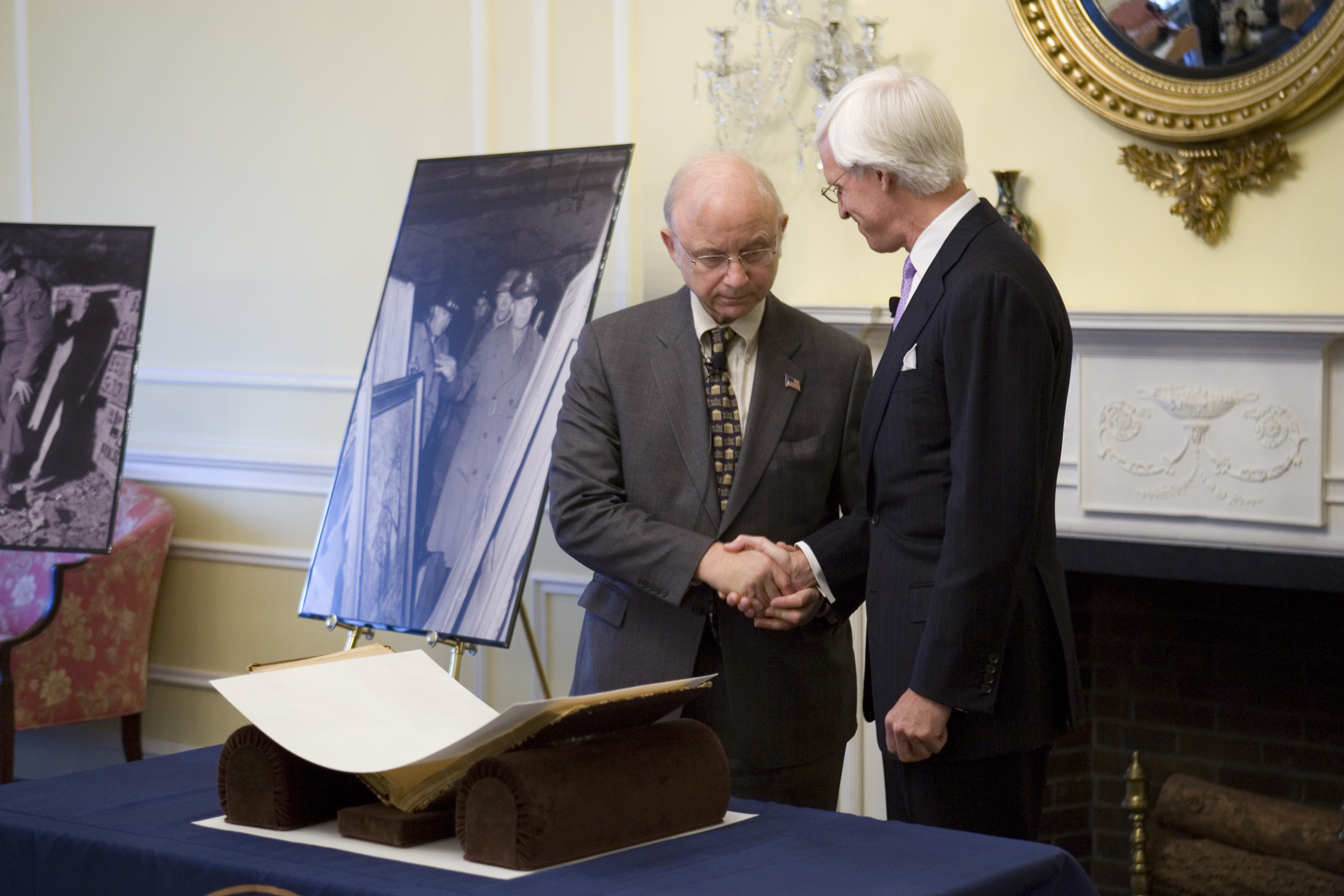
Archivist of the United States Allen Weinstein with Edsel after the donation of Nazi photograph albums.

During the course of their research into the whereabouts of lost art, Edsel and the staff of the Monuments Men Foundation discovered four large, leather-bound photograph albums which documented portions of the European art looted by the Nazis. The albums were in the possession of heirs to an American soldier stationed in the Berchtesgaden area of Germany, in the closing days of World War II.

The albums were created by the staff of the Third Reich’s Einsatzstab Reichsleiter Rosenberg (ERR), a special unit that found and confiscated the best material in Nazi-occupied countries, to use for exploitation. In France, the ERR engaged in an extensive and elaborate art looting operation, part of Hitler’s much larger premeditated scheme to steal art treasures from conquered nations. The albums were created for Hitler and high-level Nazi officials as a catalogue and, more importantly, to give Hitler a way to choose the art for his art museum in Austria. A group of these photograph albums was presented to Hitler on his birthday in 1943, to "send a ray of beauty and joy into [his] revered life." ERR staff stated that nearly 100 such volumes were created during the years of their art looting operation.

In November 2007, at a ceremony with Archivist of the United States Allen Weinstein, Edsel announced the discovery of the first two photograph albums and, separately, donated the albums to the National Archives. Weinstein called the discovery "one of the most significant finds related to Hitler’s premeditated theft of art and other cultural treasures to be found since the Nuremberg trials."

== Awards ==
In 2014, Edsel received the Records of Achievement award from the Foundation for the National Archives, for "'bringing to life the storied history of the men and women' who served in the Monuments Men".

Edsel received the International “Leonardo – The Immortal Light” Award, bestowed by the International Committee Leonardo da Vinci in recognition of his contributions to the protection and promotion of cultural heritage.

== See also ==
- Notable alumni of St. Mark's School of Texas
- Monuments, Fine Arts, and Archives program
- Monuments Men Foundation for the Preservation of Art
- Nazi plunder
- Rescuing Da Vinci
- Roberts Commission
- The Rape of Europa
