= Rescuing Da Vinci =

Book by Robert M. Edsel

- Rescuing Da Vinci cover jacket
- Author: Robert M. Edsel
- Language: English
- Subject: Art, photographic, history
- Genre: Nonfiction
- Publisher: Laurel publishing, LLC
- Publication date: 2006
- Publication place: United States
- Media type: Print (Hardback)
- Pages: 304 pp.
- ISBN: 0-9774349-0-7
- OCLC: 144222153

Rescuing Da Vinci is a largely photographic, historical book about art reclamation and preservation during and after World War II, written by American author Robert M. Edsel, published in 2006 by Laurel Publishing.

== Summary ==
This book focuses on an aspect of World War II that is largely ignored in many history books – the Nazi looting of Europe and Russia and the Allied recovery and repatriation of stolen art. Little known to the general public, Hitler diverted his attention from the prosecution of the war to the systematic theft of Europe's great art. His dream was to build the world's greatest collection – The Führermuseum – in his hometown of Linz, Austria. European museum officials took extraordinary measures to protect art from Hitler and the ensuing war. When U.S. forces prepared to enter Europe, they assembled a special force of largely American and British museum directors, curators, and art historians known as the Monuments, Fine Arts, and Archives program (MFAA) section, attached to the Allied armies.

These "Monuments Men" attempted to minimize damage to European monuments and architecture, and to track down stolen works of art. Their effort would become one of the greatest "treasure hunts" in history. In the end, Allied forces located more than 1,000 repositories in mines and castles across Europe, many of which were filled with art, sculpture, furniture, archives, and other cultural property stolen by the Nazis. Edsel notes that thousands of pieces are still missing, such as Raphael's Portrait of a Young Man from the Czartoryski Museum in Kraków, Poland.

Rescuing Da Vinci tells this story through brief text and more than 460 photographs, 60 of which are in color. This group of photographs has never been published in a single book, and many have not been seen in decades. Images such as Michelangelo's David entombed in brick for protection or a Rembrandt Self Portrait sitting atop crates in a salt mine, capture the story in ways beyond words.

== Organization ==
Forewords to Rescuing Da Vinci were written by Lynn Nicholas, author of The Rape of Europa (a scholarly 1994 book on the same subject), and Dr. Edmund Pillsbury, former director of the Kimbell Art Museum in Fort Worth, Texas.

Nine chapters document the history from Hitler's artistic ideals and his premeditated theft of Europe to the formation of the MFAA and their recovery and restitution of thousands of works of art and other cultural properties. Edsel closes the book with a chapter on the destroyed and lost monuments and works of art that are a continued legacy of Hitler's destruction.

Each chapter begins with several pages of text, followed by dozens of photographs with detailed captions. Also included are maps that mark the location of the Mona Lisa at all stages during the war, the location of all fourteen known Leonardo da Vinci paintings, and the locations of major Nazi repositories in Germany and Austria.

== Themes ==
=== Nazi destruction ===
While art theft is not commonly associated with the Nazi reign, and perhaps thought by some to be insignificant in comparison to the number of lives lost during World War II at the hands of Hitler, Edsel points out that it was another premeditated and destructive plan of the Nazis. By classifying contemporary artists and their work as "degenerate," Hitler sought to rid Europe of what he considered to be undesirable artwork. Hundreds of paintings were removed from museums, many destroyed by Nazis in symbolic burnings. Catalogues reprinted in Rescuing Da Vinci list works of art in other countries which Hitler desired for his own museum, and that he was determined to obtain, by whatever means necessary. Edsel points out that the cultural loss inflicted by Nazi plundering cannot be ignored in discussing Nazi destruction.

=== Jewish Holocaust ===
This book also reveals often-ignored aspects of the Nazi plan to rid Europe of its Jewish population. Photographs showing warehouses of furniture and household items from pianos to children's toys, all of which had been looted from Jewish families, symbolize the reach and extent of the Holocaust. Museums and mines full of stolen paintings show the work of the ERR, the organization in France that "legalized" the seizure of Jewish collections and property.

=== Restitution ===
The effects of Nazi looting are still being felt in the early 21st century. Many victims and their families are just now having stolen paintings returned to them. Some of these cases, such as that of Maria Altmann, have made headlines. Rescuing Da Vinci shows the beginning stages of this restitution work, performed by the MFAA 60 years ago. Edsel argues that many more cases such as Altmann's will surface in the coming years.

=== Americanism ===
Rescuing Da Vinci points out the strengths and good deeds of the U.S. military. It also demonstrates the appreciation of foreign governments for the United States' actions. However, some argue that it relies too heavily on the effects of the American involvement. "Although Rescuing Da Vinci mentions Allied officers throughout Europe, the focus is primarily on Americans and could benefit from greater mention of European contributions." (Shauna Isaac, The Art Newspaper)

== Research ==
Edsel spent years researching the subject before writing Rescuing Da Vinci. He used researchers in more than a dozen countries to search foreign archives for photographs, as well as performing extensive research at the National Archives in College Park, Maryland. He and his team continue to research MFAA personnel in order to develop biographies on all and honor their achievements.

== Reception ==
In this book Robert Edsel and his extraordinary team of researchers have retrieved and reproduced for the general public a rare collection of photographs illustrating the dramatic vicissitudes of Europe's masterpieces and the people who held them dear. No one who has seen these pictures will ever again view a painting in a museum or an historic building without being reminded of the terrible dangers which may have befallen it and marveling at the miracle of its survival.... This book and its unforgettable images will surely help in that endeavor, and Robert Edsel is to be commended for commemorating here the terrible events of World War II and the heroic efforts of the "Monuments Men" to save Europe's artistic treasures.

— Lynn Nicholas, author of The Rape of Europa

Rescuing Da Vinci uses period photographs rather than words to tell the story of Hitler's desire to rid Germany of 'degenerate art' and the campaign to loot the best of European art from conquered territories. ... The one that stays in my mind is Rembrandt's Nightwatch, safely home once more, being unrolled on a carpet... How must it have felt to take such a precious painting off its stretchers and roll it up?

— Marion Boddy-Evans, About.com

In his first literary effort, oil magnate-cum-art lover Edsel succeeds with flying colors. Complete with hundreds of never-before-seen photos, many of them in full color, the book is as much a feast for the eyes as it is food for thought. Throughout Rescuing Da Vinci beats the pulse of excitement that accompanies any good mystery, and it leaves the reader dying to know where still-uncovered works of art may be.

— Stephanie Ramsay, Jewish Independent

== Related films ==
A 2007 film, The Rape of Europa, was co-produced by Edsel and Actual Films. A 2014 film, The Monuments Men, stars George Clooney (who also produced and directed) and has a prominent cast.

== See also ==
- Monuments, Fine Arts, and Archives program
