= Monuments, Fine Arts, and Archives program =

Allied program to help protect cultural property (1943-1946)

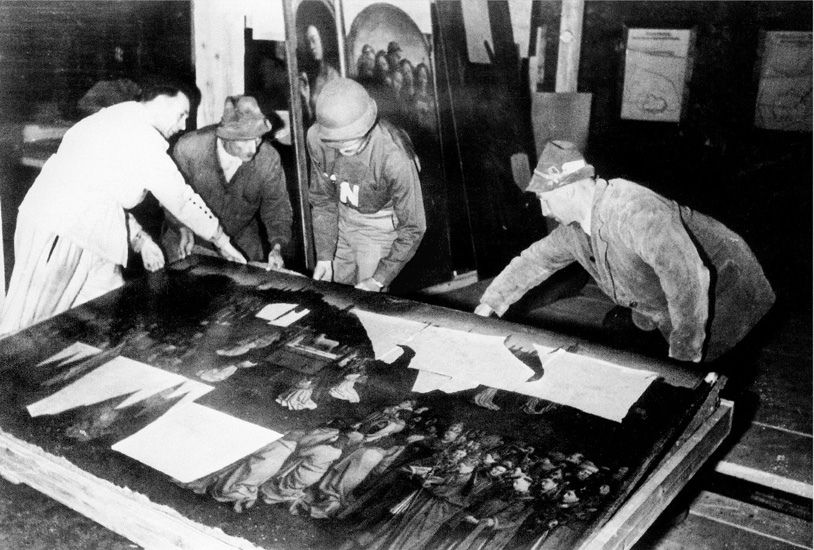
- The Ghent Altarpiece during recovery from the art depot in the Altaussee salt mine, 1945
- Formation: 1943
- Dissolved: 1946
- Parent organization: Civil Affairs and Military Government Sections of the Allied armies

The Monuments, Fine Arts, and Archives Section Unit (MFAA) was a program established by the Allies in 1943 to help protect cultural property in war areas during and after World War II. The group of about 400 service members and civilians worked with military forces to protect historic and cultural monuments from war damage, and as the conflict came to a close, to find and return works of art and other items of cultural importance that had been stolen by the Nazis or hidden for safekeeping. Spurred by the Roberts Commission, MFAA branches were established within the Civil Affairs and Military Government Sections of Allied armies.

Many of the men and women of the MFAA, also known as "Monuments Men", went on to have prolific careers. Largely art historians and museum personnel, many of the American members of the group had formative roles in the growth of the United States’ most prominent cultural institutions, including the National Gallery of Art, the Metropolitan Museum of Art, the Isabella Stewart Gardner Museum and the New York City Ballet. Members from other allied powers, such as the United Kingdom and France, also found post-war success in museums and other institutions across the world. Some of them are portrayed and honored in the 2014 film The Monuments Men.

Monuments Men Foundation for the Preservation of Art, a US non-profit founded by American author and philanthropist Robert M. Edsel was created with the stated mission of preserving the legacy of those who served in the MFAA. The Foundation seeks to further the mission of the MFAA by recovering Nazi looted artworks, documents, and other cultural objects and returning them to their rightful owners. Monuments men and women have worked directly with the Foundation, including Harry L. Ettlinger and Motoko Fujishiro Huthwaite.

== Formation ==
Even before the U.S. entered World War II, art professionals and organizations such as the American Defense Harvard Group and the American Council of Learned Societies (ACLS) were working to identify and protect European art and monuments in harm’s way or in danger of Nazi plundering. The groups sought a national organization affiliated with the military which would have the same goal. Francis Henry Taylor, director of the Metropolitan Museum of Art, took their concerns to Washington, D.C. Their efforts ultimately led to the establishment by U.S. President Franklin D. Roosevelt of the "American Commission for the Protection and Salvage of Artistic and Historic Monuments in War Areas" on June 23, 1943.

What began as a brain trust of the art world's finest during the war became a group of 345 men and women from 13 countries that comprised the Monuments, Fine Arts and Archives Section unit. They spent 1945 seeking out more than 1,000 troves containing an estimated 5 million pieces of artwork and cultural items stolen from wealthy Jews, museums, universities, and religious institutions. For six years after the surrender, a smaller group of about 60 Monuments Men continued scouring Europe as art detectives.

Commonly referred to as the Roberts Commission after its chairman, Supreme Court Justice Owen J. Roberts, the group was charged with promoting the preservation of cultural properties in war areas, including the European, Mediterranean, and Far Eastern Theaters of Operations, providing that this mission did not interfere with military operations. Headquartered at the National Gallery of Art in Washington D.C., the Commission drew up lists of and reports on European cultural treasures and provided them to military units, in hopes that these monuments would be protected whenever possible.

The Commission helped establish the MFAA branch within the Civil Affairs and Military Government Sections of the Allied armies, led by Major L. Bancel LaFarge. After the war, the Roberts Commission helped the MFAA and Allied Forces return Nazi-confiscated artworks to rightful owners. It also promoted public awareness of looted cultural works. The group was dissolved in June 1946, when the State Department took over its duties and functions.

General Dwight D. Eisenhower facilitated the work of the MFAA by forbidding looting, destruction, and billeting in structures of cultural significance. He also repeatedly ordered his forces to assist the MFAA as much as possible. This was the first time in history an army attempted to fight a war and at the same time reduce damage to cultural monuments and property:

Prior to this war, no army had thought of protecting the monuments of the country in which and with which it was at war, and there were no precedents to follow.... All this was changed by a general order issued by Supreme Commander-in-Chief [General Eisenhower] just before he left Algiers, an order accompanied by a personal letter to all Commanders...the good name of the Army depended in great measure on the respect which it showed to the art heritage of the modern world.

— Lt. Col. Sir Leonard Woolley, Monuments, Fine Arts, and Archives Officer

== War operations ==
As Allied Forces made their way through Europe, liberating Nazi-occupied territories, the Monuments Men were present in very small numbers at the front lines. Lacking handbooks, resources, or supervision – even precedent for their work – this initial handful of officers relied on their museum training and overall resourcefulness to perform their tasks. They worked in the field under the Operations Branch of SHAEF (Supreme Headquarters Allied Expeditionary Force, Europe, commanded by Eisenhower), and were actively involved in battle preparations. In preparing to take Florence, which was used by the Nazis as a supply distribution center due to its central location in Italy, Allied troops relied on aerial photographs provided by the MFAA which were marked with monuments of cultural importance so that pilots could avoid damaging such sites during bombings.

When damage to monuments did occur, MFAA personnel worked to assess it and buy time for the eventual restoration work that would follow. Monuments officer Deane Keller had a prominent role in saving the Campo Santo in Pisa after a mortar round started a fire that melted the lead roof, which then bled down the iconic 14th century fresco-covered walls. Keller led a team of Italian and American troops and restorers in recovering the remaining fragments of the frescoes and in building a temporary roof to protect the structure from further damage. Restoration of the frescoes continues even today.

Countless other monuments, churches, and works of art were saved or protected by personnel of the MFAA section, whose dedication to their work would frequently draw them ahead of battle lines. Entering liberated towns and cities ahead of ground troops, Monuments Men worked quickly to assess damage and make temporary repairs before moving on with Allied Armies as they conquered Nazi territory.

Two monuments officers were killed in Europe, both near the front lines of the Allied advance into Germany. Captain Walter Huchthausen, an American scholar and architect attached to the U.S. 9th Army, fell to small arms fire in April 1945 somewhere north of Essen and east of Aachen, Germany. Major Ronald Edmond Balfour, a British scholar attached to the Canadian First Army, died from a shell-burst in March 1945 while operating beyond the Allied front line in Cleves, Germany.

== Art repositories ==
American and allied forces in Europe discovered hidden caches of priceless treasures. While many were the product of looting by Adolf Hitler and the Nazis, others had been legitimately evacuated from museums, churches, public buildings, and elsewhere for safekeeping. Monuments Men oversaw the safeguarding, cataloguing, removal and packing of all works from all these repositories.

In Italy, museum officials had sent their holdings to various countryside locations such as the Tuscan villa of Montegufoni, which housed some of the Florentine collections. As Allied forces advanced through Italy, the German army retreated north, stealing paintings and sculptures from these repositories as they fled. As German forces neared the Austrian border, they were forced to store most of their loot in various hiding places, such as a castle at Sand in Taufers and a jail cell in San Leonardo.

Beginning in late March 1945, Allied forces began discovering these hidden repositories in what became the "greatest treasure hunt in history". In Germany alone, U.S. forces found about 1,500 repositories of art and cultural objects looted from institutions and individuals across Europe, as well as German and Austrian museum collections that had been evacuated for safekeeping. Soviet forces also made discoveries, such as treasures from the extraordinary Dresden Transport Museum. Hundreds of the artifacts were surrendered by, or had their locations reported by, SS General Karl Wolff as part of Operation Sunrise, his secret negotiation with the Office of Strategic Services. These included the contents of the Uffizi and Pitti palaces, and paintings by Titian and Botticelli.

Some of the repositories discovered by Monuments Men in Germany, Austria, and Italy were:

- Berchtesgaden, Germany: The 101st Airborne Division, known as the "Screaming Eagles", found more than 1,000 paintings and sculptures stolen by German Reichsmarschall Hermann Göring. The cache had been transferred from his country estate, Carinhall, and moved to Berchtesgaden in April 1945.
- Bernterode, Germany: Americans found four coffins containing the remains of Germany’s greatest leaders, including those of Frederick the Great (Frederick II of Prussia) and field marshal Paul von Hindenburg. Also found in the mine were 271 paintings, including court portraits from the Prussian Sanssouci palace in Potsdam, Germany, which had been hidden behind a locked door and a brick wall nearly five feet thick. The site was originally used as an ammunition and military supply complex manned by hundreds of slave laborers.
- Merkers, Germany: The Kaiserode mine at Merkers was discovered by the U.S. 3rd Army under General George S. Patton in April 1945. Reichsbank gold, along with 400 paintings from the Berlin museums and numerous other crates of treasures were also discovered. Discoveries also included gold and personal belongings from Nazi concentration camp victims.
- Neuschwanstein Castle, Germany: Over 6,000 items stolen by the ERR (Einsatzstab Reichsleiter Rosenberg, Alfred Rosenberg’s task force that handled the "legalized" looting of Jews) from private collectors in France were found here, including furniture, jewelry (see Nazi gold), paintings and other belongings. Monuments Man Capt. James Rorimer oversaw the evacuation of the repository, which also held ERR documents.
- Altaussee, Austria: This extensive complex of salt mines served as a huge repository for art stolen by the Nazis, but it also contained holdings from Austrian collections. More than 6,500 paintings alone were discovered at Altaussee. The contents included: Belgian-owned treasures such as Michelangelo’s Madonna of Bruges stolen from the Church of Our Lady in Bruges, and Jan van Eyck’s Ghent Altarpiece stolen from Saint Bavo Cathedral in Ghent; Vermeer’s The Astronomer and The Art of Painting which were to be focal points of Hitler’s Führermuseum in Linz, Austria; and paintings from the Capodimonte Museum in Naples, Italy that had been stolen by the Hermann Göring Tank Division (Fallschirm-Panzer Division 1 Hermann Göring) at Monte Cassino in Italy.
- San Leonardo, Italy: In the jail cell of this far northern town, Allied officials discovered paintings from the Uffizi that had been hurriedly unloaded by retreating German troops. Among the masterpieces were paintings by Sandro Botticelli, Filippo Lippi and Giovanni Bellini.

== Restitution ==
In addition to preserving and cataloguing stolen and displaced treasures, MFAA efforts established pathways for restitution; initially, this took place in the form of return to a rightful owner, when identified.

=== Central Collecting Points ===
Centralized collection depots began being established in the immediate aftermath of the war. In early May 1945, Lt. Col. Geoffrey Webb, British MFAA chief at Eisenhower’s headquarters, proposed that U.S. forces quickly prepare buildings in Germany so that they might receive large shipments of artworks and other cultural property found in the numerous repositories. Eisenhower directed his subordinates to immediately begin preparing such buildings, ordering that art objects were to be handled only by MFAA personnel. Suitable locations with little damage and adequate storage space were difficult to find.

The first Central Collecting Point (CCP), the Marburg Central Collecting Point, opened in the wake of Germany's unconditional surrender. Shortly after U.S. forces established two other CCP within the U.S. Zone in Germany: Munich Central Collecting Point and Wiesbaden. Secondary collecting points were also established in various German towns, including: Bad Wildungen, Bamberg, Bremen, Goslar, Heilbronn, Nuremberg, Oberammergau, Vornbach, and Würzburg. One of the more critical of these secondary collecting points was the Offenbach Archival Depot, where officials processed millions of Nazi-looted books, archives, manuscripts, Jewish objects such as Torah scrolls, and property seized from Masonic lodges.

In summer 1945, Capt. Walter Farmer became the Wiesbaden Collecting Point's first director. When his superiors ordered that he send to the U.S. 202 German-owned paintings in his custody, Farmer and 35 others who were in charge of the Wiesbaden collection point gathered to draw up what has become known as the Wiesbaden manifesto on 7 November 1945, declaring "We wish to state that, from our own knowledge, no historical grievance will rankle so long or be the cause of so much justified bitterness as the removal for any reason of a part of the heritage of any nation even if that heritage may be interpreted as a prize of war." Among the co-signers was Lt. Charles Percy Parkhurst of the U.S. Navy.

Once an object arrived at a collecting point, it was recorded, photographed, studied, and sometimes conserved so that it could be returned to its country of origin as soon as possible. Some objects were easily identifiable and could be quickly returned, such as the Veit Stoss Altar of Veit Stoss from St. Mary's Basilica in Kraków, which had been discovered in the Nuremberg Castle. Others, such as unmarked paintings or library collections, were much more difficult to process. Among the facilities were:

- Marburg Central Collecting Point: Monuments officer Walker Hancock established at the end of World War II the first Collecting Point for art depots in central Germany with the help of German institutions. After one year, in the middle of August 1946, the institution was dissolved and the remaining objects were moved to Wiesbaden.
- Munich Central Collecting Point: Monuments officer Lt. Craig Hugh Smyth established the Munich CCP in July 1945. He converted the former Führerbau, which housed Hitler’s office, into a functional art depot complete with photography studios and conservation labs. This facility primarily housed art stolen by the ERR from private collections and Hitler’s collection found at Altaussee.
- Wiesbaden Central Collecting Point: Monuments officer Capt. Walter Farmer helped establish this facility in July 1945. Art from the Berlin museums and other items found in the mines at Merkers were processed here. Museum collections stored at Siegen and Grasleben also were sent to Wiesbaden.
- Offenbach Archival Depot: Established in July 1945 in the I.G. Farben building on the Main River just outside Frankfurt, Offenbach primarily served as an archival depot. Because the OCP housed the largest collection of Jewish cultural property in the world, including the entire holdings of the Rothschild Library in Frankfurt and cultural objects from Masonic lodges, restitutions were complicated. Identification of the millions of books, religious objects and other materials was tedious. Many of the owners had become victims of the Holocaust leaving no one alive to pursue claims. The facility was closed in 1948 and its remaining unclaimed items were transferred to Wiesbaden.

== Occupation of Japan ==
As the war neared its end in Japan in 1945, Monuments Men George Stout and Major Laurence Sickman recommended creating an MFAA division there. Consequently, the Arts and Monuments Division of the Civil Information and Education Section of GHQ of the Supreme Command of the Allied Powers in Tokyo was established. Stout was the Chief of the Division from about August 1945 until the middle of 1946.

Langdon Warner, archaeologist and curator of Oriental art at Harvard’s Fogg Museum, advised the MFAA Section in Japan from April to September 1946. Other members included Howard Hollis, Lt. Col. Harold Gould Henderson, Lt. Sherman Lee, and Lt. Patrick Lennox Tierney.

== MFAA personnel ==
The American museum establishment led the efforts to create the MFAA section. Its members included museum directors, curators, and art historians, as well as those who aspired to join their ranks. Many major museums employed one or more MFAA officers before or after the war, including the National Gallery of Art, the Metropolitan Museum of Art, the Museum of Modern Art, the Toledo Museum of Art, and the Nelson-Atkins Museum of Art.

Many other Monuments Men were or became professors at esteemed universities such as Harvard, Yale, Princeton, New York University, Williams College, and Columbia University, among others. Paul J. Sachs’ famous "Museum Course" at Harvard had educated dozens of future museum personnel in the decades preceding World War II. S. Lane Faison's passion for art history was passed on to hundreds of students and future museum leaders at Williams College in the 1960s and 1970s, some of whom are currently directors at major United States museums.

Upon returning home from service overseas, many former MFAA personnel led the creation or improvement of some of the leading cultural institutions in the United States. MFAA personnel became founders, presidents, and members of cultural institutions such as the New York City Ballet, the New York City Landmarks Preservation Commission, the American Association of Museums, the American Association of Museum Directors, the Archaeological Institute of America, the Society of Architectural Historians, the American Society of Landscape Architects, the National Endowment for the Humanities, and the National Endowment for the Arts, as well as respected artists, architects, musicians, and archivists.

Several portraits of British Monuments Men and Women are in the permanent collection of National Portrait Gallery, London.

== Awards ==
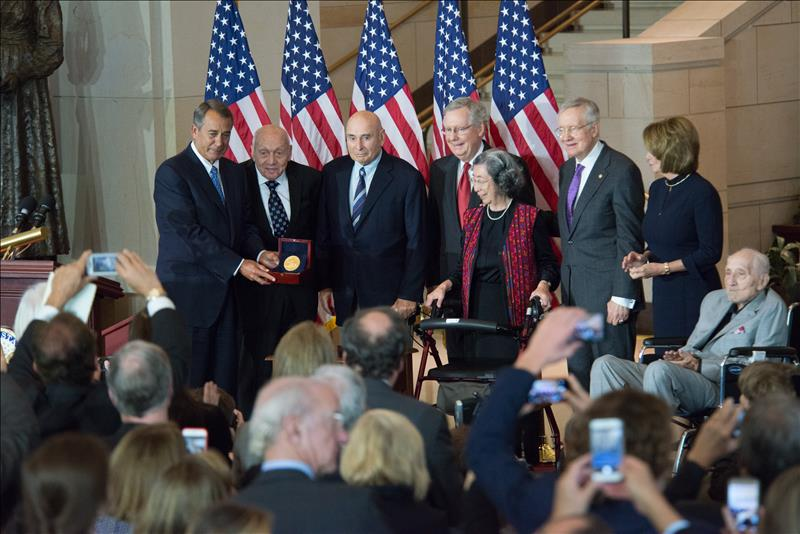
Surviving members receiving the Congressional Gold Medal in 2015

- Monuments Men Congressional Gold Medal
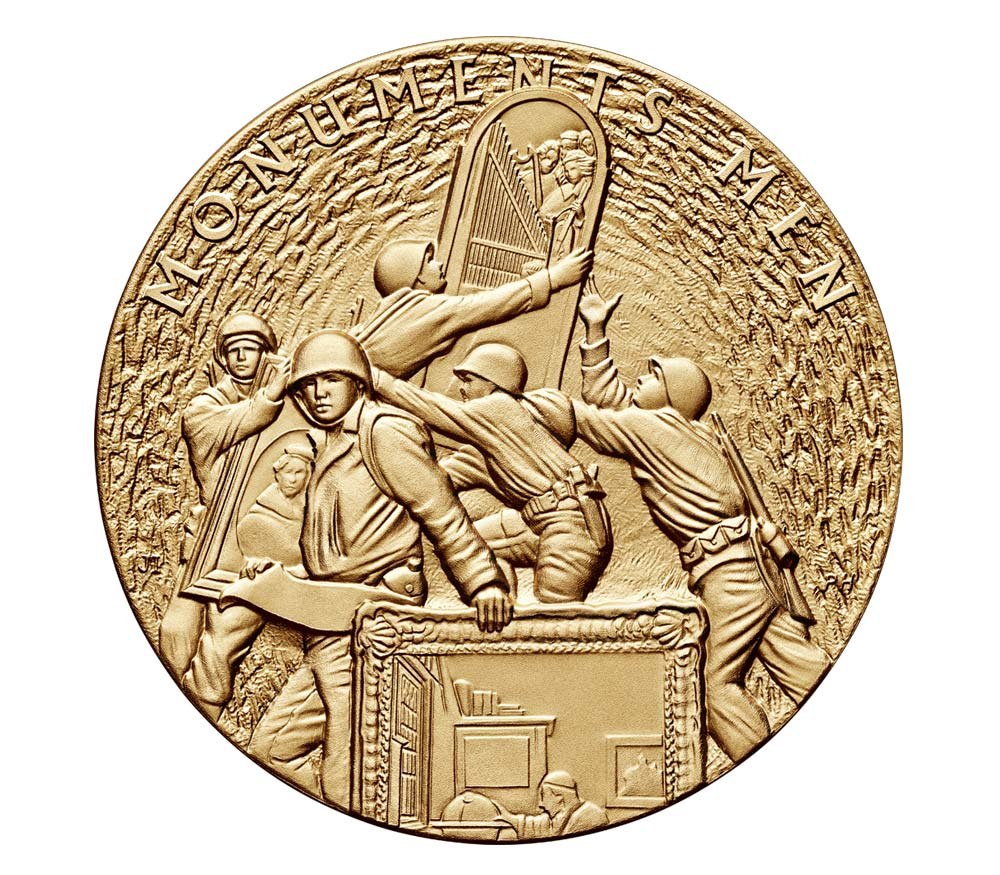
  Front
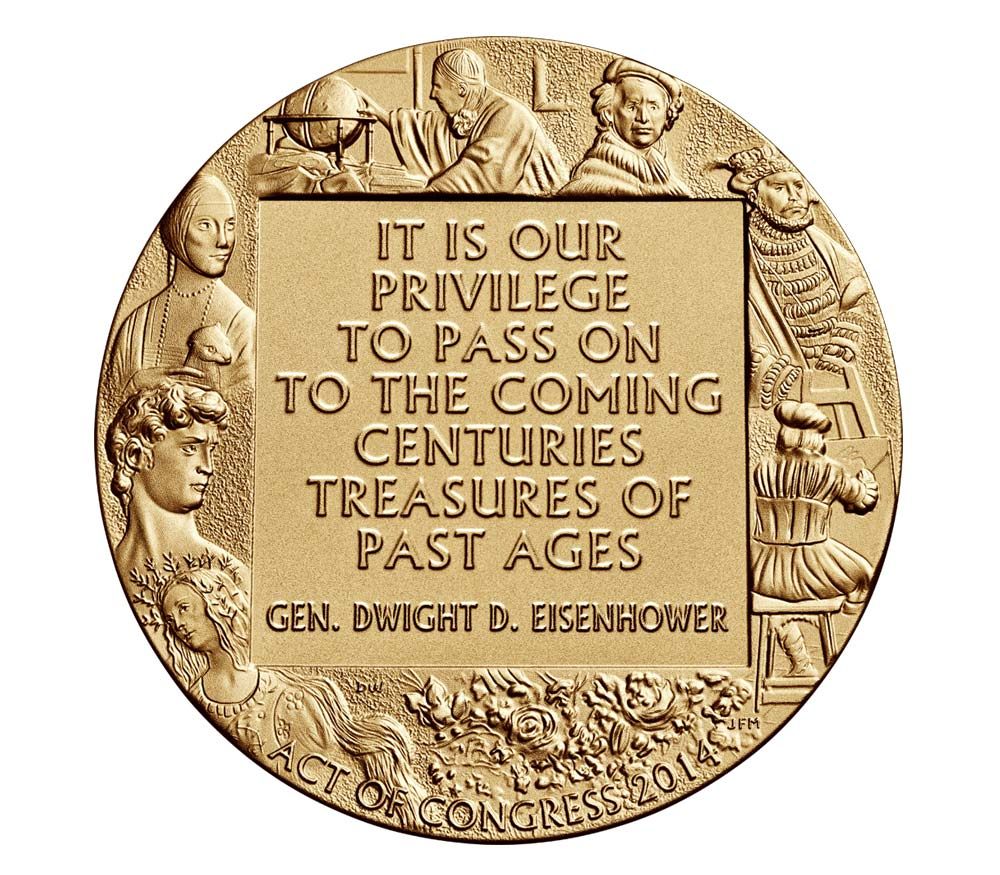
  Reverse
  Presented 9 June 2014.
  2007 National Humanities Medal, was awarded to the Monuments Men Foundation for the Preservation of Art on behalf of the US.
- 2009 honorary Doctor of Fine Arts, by MassArt
- On 19 May 2014, the United States House of Representatives voted to pass the Monuments Men Recognition Act of 2013, a bill that would award the Monuments Men a Congressional Gold Medal "in recognition of their heroic role in the preservation, protection, and restitution of monuments, works of art, and artifacts of cultural importance during and following" World War II. Representatives praised the Monuments Men for preserving cultural heritage. The award was given after several years of tireless work on the part of the Monuments Men Foundation for the Preservation of Art, and its founder Robert M. Edsel.

== 2014 film ==
The Monuments, Fine Arts, and Archives program is the subject of the 2014 Sony Pictures and 20th Century Fox film The Monuments Men. The film, which stars George Clooney, Matt Damon, Jean Dujardin, Cate Blanchett, and John Goodman, is based on Robert M. Edsel's New York Times best-selling 2007 book The Monuments Men: Allied Heroes, Nazi Thieves and the Greatest Treasure Hunt in History.

== See also ==
- Art repatriation
- Art theft and looting during World War II
- Counterintelligence Corps
- Soviet plunder
