= List of memorials to James Madison =

This is a list of memorials to James Madison, Founding Father and fourth president of the United States.

== Artworks ==
- Statue of James Madison, 1976

== Buildings ==
- James Madison Memorial Building, the official national memorial to Madison, part of the Library of Congress
- Madison Square Garden

== Cities, towns, or villages ==
- Madison, Connecticut
- Madison, Georgia
- Madison, Maine
- Madison, Mississippi
- Madison, Missouri
- Madison, New Hampshire
- Madison, New Jersey
- Madison, Pennsylvania
- Madison, Wisconsin, the capital of Wisconsin
- Madison Lake, Minnesota

== Counties ==
- Madison County, Alabama
- Madison County, Arkansas
- Madison County, Florida
- Madison County, Georgia
- Madison County, Idaho
- Madison County, Illinois
- Madison County, Indiana
- Madison County, Iowa
- Madison County, Kentucky
- Madison County, Mississippi
- Madison County, Missouri
- Madison County, Montana
- Madison County, New York
- Madison County, North Carolina
- Madison County, Ohio
- Madison County, Tennessee
- Madison County, Texas
- Madison County, Virginia
- Madison Parish, Louisiana

== Educational institutions ==
- James Madison College at Michigan State University
- James Madison High School
- James Madison Middle School
- James Madison University
- James Madison High School (Portland, Oregon)

== Topographical features ==
- Madison Range
- Madison River
- Mount Madison

== Military structures ==
- Fort Madison, stockade fort used during the Creek War
- Fort Madison, fort used during the War of 1812. Subsequent community that grew around the fort came to be called Fort Madison.
- Fort Madison, Nuku Hiva, first United States naval base in the Pacific Ocean

== Military vessels ==
- USS James Madison (1807) was commissioned in 1807.
- USS Madison (1812) was a 14-gun schooner launched in 1812.
- USS Madison (1832) was a Van Buren-class schooner, designed by Edward Preble and built in 1832.
- USS James Madison (SSBN-627), in commission 1963–1992.

== Parks and public spaces ==
- Madison Square in New York City
- Madison Square in Savannah, Georgia

== Streets ==
- Madison Avenue in New York City
- Madison Avenue in North Belfast, United Kingdom
- Madison Street in Chicago

== Other ==
- James Madison Institute
- James Madison Memorial Fellowship Foundation

== See also ==
- Madison Township (disambiguation)
- Presidential memorials in the United States
