= Pennsylvania Railroad World War II Memorial =

Memorial in Philadelphia, Pennsylvania, US

- 30th Street Station; Philadelphia, Pennsylvania; United States
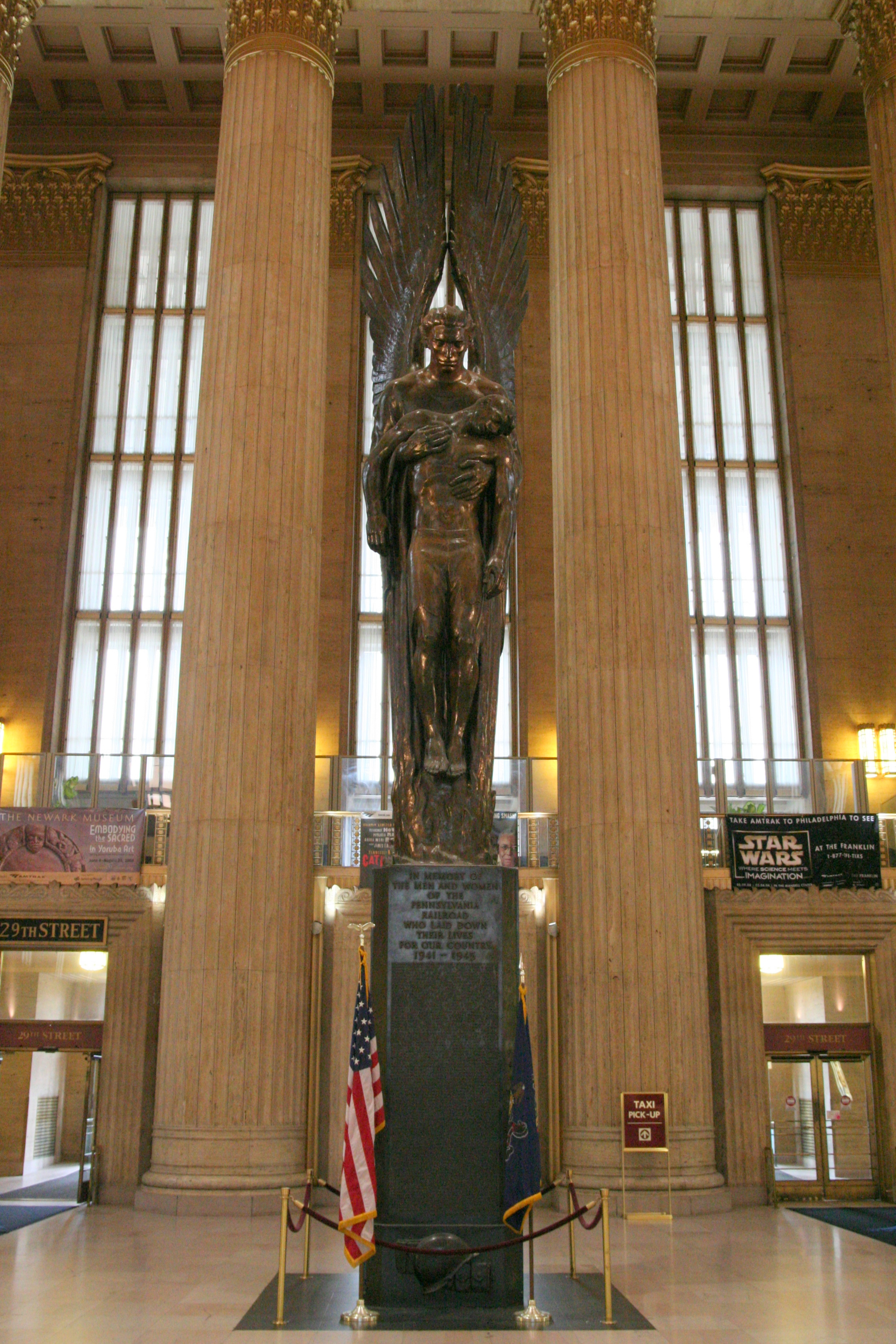
- For the 1,307 PRR employees who died in World War II.
- Unveiled: August 10, 1952: Height: 39 ft (12 m); Weight: 10.5 short tons (9.5 t)
- Location: 39°57′21″N 75°10′57″W; Philadelphia, PA
- Designed by: Walker Hancock
- "In memory of the men and women of the Pennsylvania Railroad who laid down their lives for our country 1941–1945." "That all travelers here may remember those of the Pennsylvania Railroad who did not return from the Second World War."; The memorial is also inscribed with the names of the 1,307 employees.

Philadelphia Register of Historic Places
- Designated: September 12, 2001

The Pennsylvania Railroad World War II Memorial is a monument on the main concourse of 30th Street Station in Philadelphia, Pennsylvania. It commemorates the 1,307 Pennsylvania Railroad employees who died in World War II.

== History ==
The monument features a 28-foot (8.53 m) heroic-sized bronze sculpture, Angel of the Resurrection, that portrays Michael the Archangel lifting up the soul of a dead soldier from the "flames of war". The sculpture is set upon an 11-foot (3.35 m) black-granite base, with two inscribed dedications and four bronze plaques listing the 1,307 names in alphabetical order. The work was designed and created by Walker Hancock (1901–1998), Instructor of Sculpture at the Pennsylvania Academy of the Fine Arts. Hancock served in the U.S. Army during World War II, and had been one of the "Monuments Men" who recovered art looted by the Nazis.

The monument is unusual in its intense verticality, which was inspired by the tall Corinthian columns of the concourse's east colonnade behind it. Viewing the monument is particularly dramatic in the morning, when it is silhouetted against sunlight streaming through the four-story windows between the columns. It remains Hancock's most famous work, and was his personal favorite.

The memorial was dedicated on August 10, 1952. Army General Omar Bradley, chairman of the Joint Chiefs of Staff, spoke at the ceremony. It was unveiled by Army Sergeant Robert E. Laws, a sheet-metal worker at the Pennsylvania Railroad's Altoona Works and a recipient of the Medal of Honor for his bravery in combat in the Philippines.

The two inscriptions read:

- IN MEMORY OF THE MEN AND WOMEN OF THE PENNSYLVANIA RAILROAD WHO LAID DOWN THEIR LIVES FOR OUR COUNTRY 1941–1945.
- THAT ALL TRAVELERS HERE MAY REMEMBER THOSE OF THE PENNSYLVANIA RAILROAD WHO DID NOT RETURN FROM THE SECOND WORLD WAR.

Hancock bequeathed his one-third-scale plaster model to the Museum of Fine Arts, Boston. Following years in storage, it was restored and placed on permanent exhibit in the new Art of the Americas Wing, in November 2010.

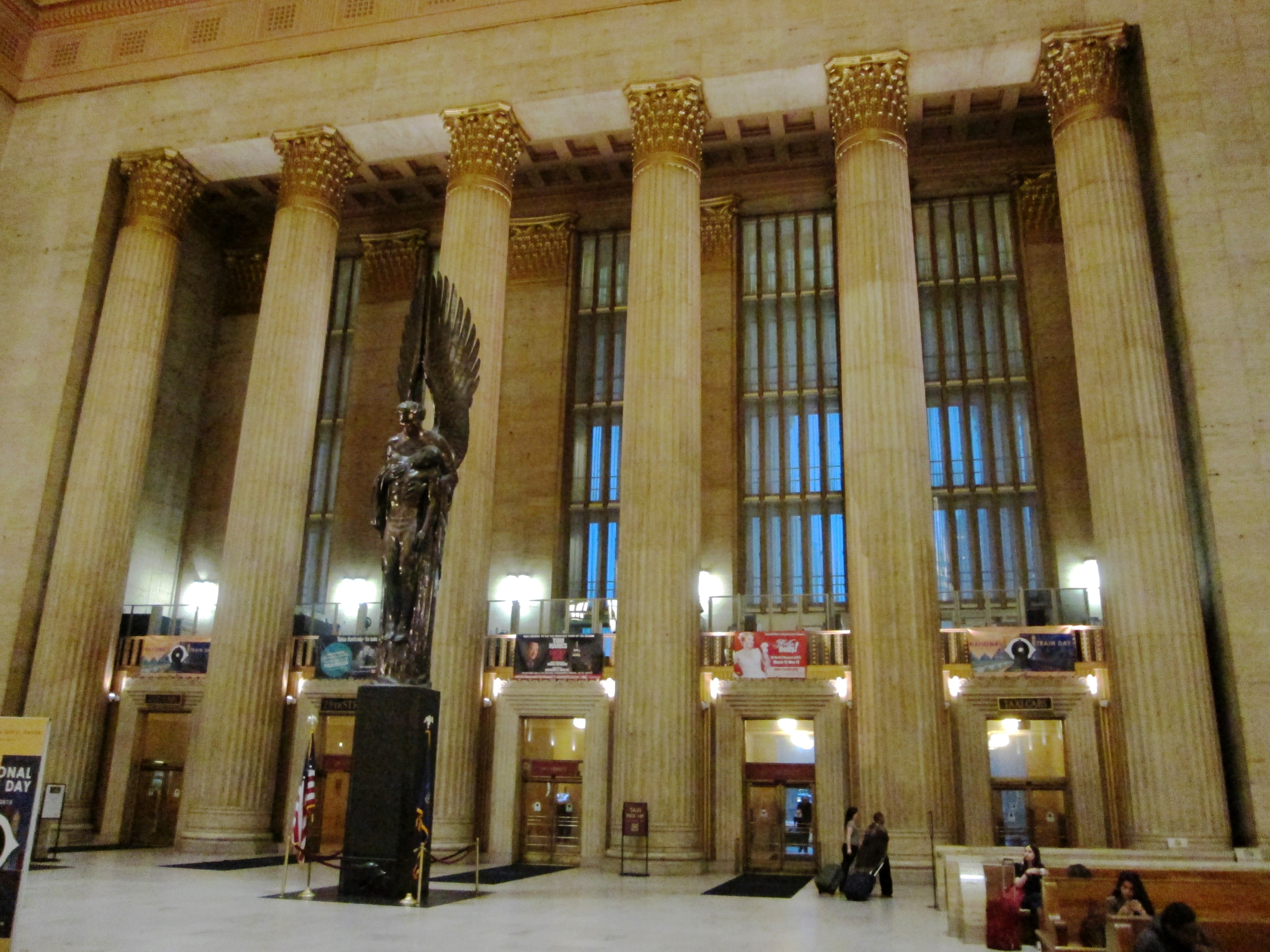
Main Concourse, 30th Street Station, looking east.

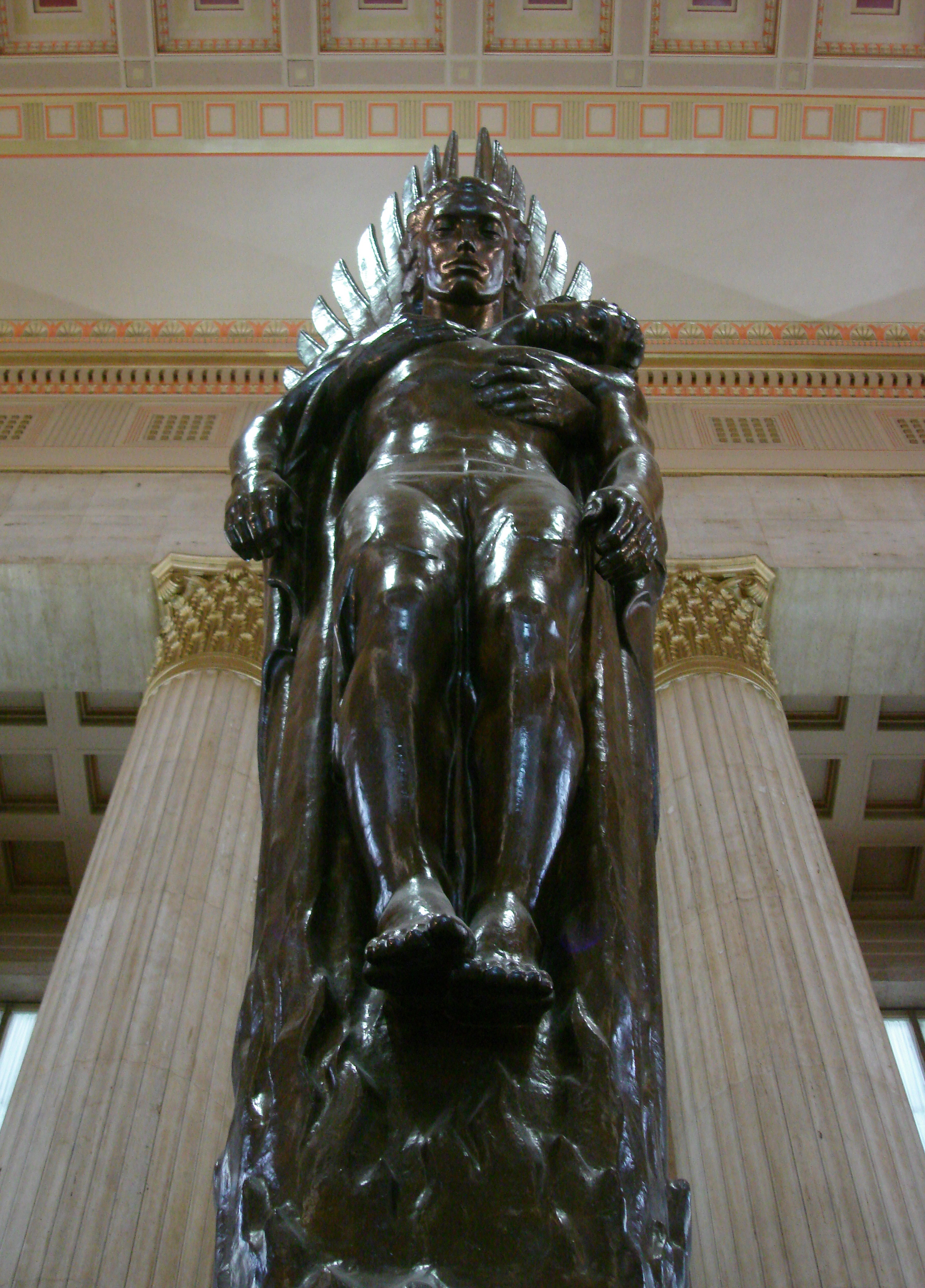
The sculpture viewed from below.

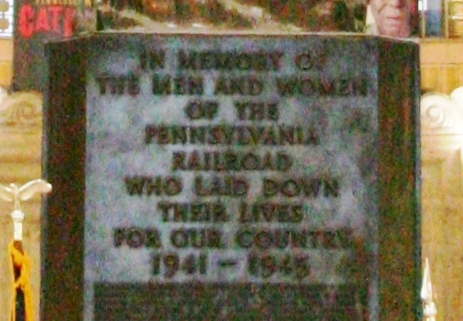
Inscription on the front of the monument; another is on the back.

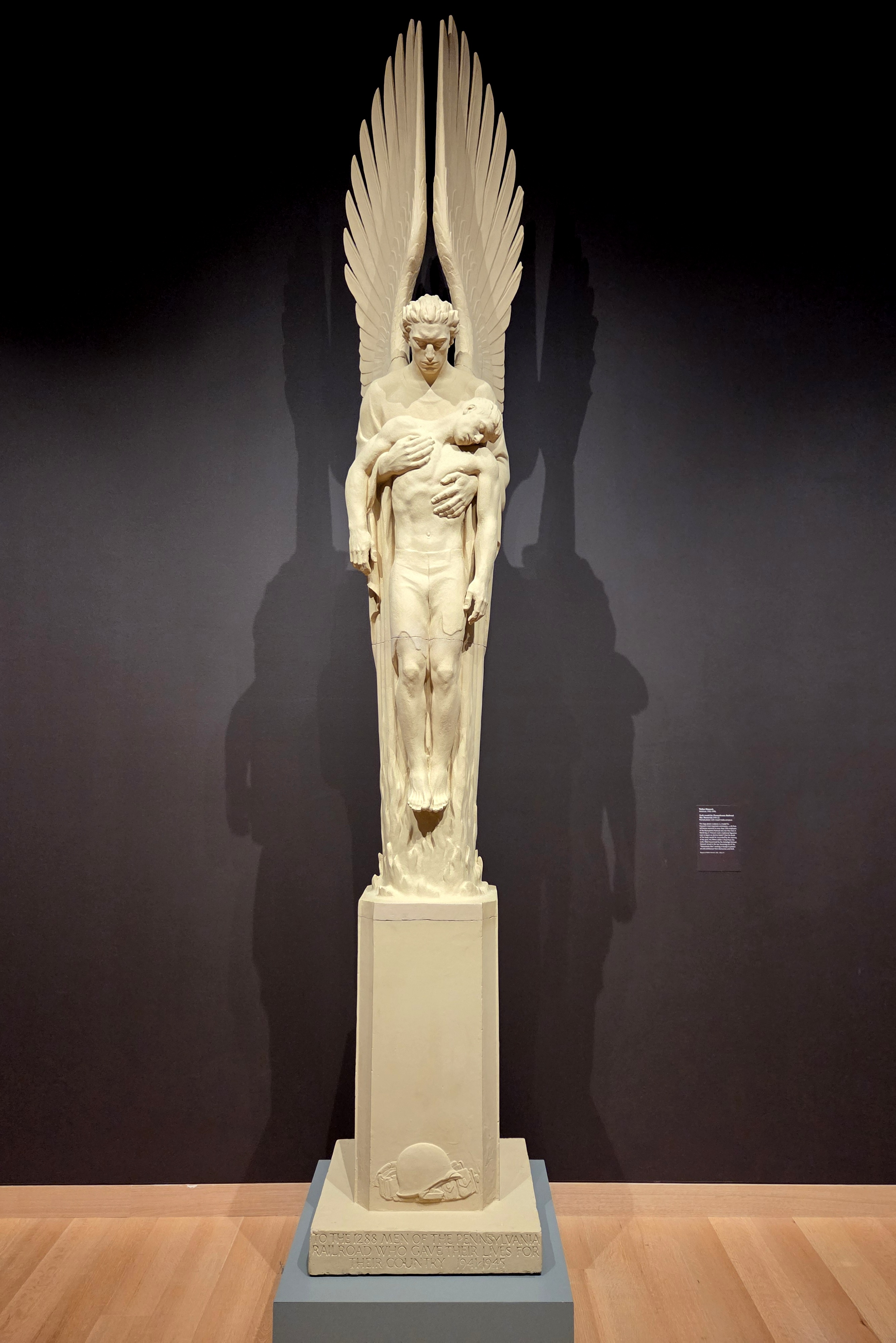
One-third-scale model at the Museum of Fine Arts, Boston
