= Walker Hancock =

American sculptor (1901–1998)

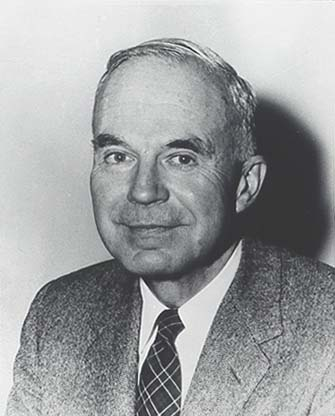
- Hancock, c. 1960
- Born: June 28, 1901; St. Louis, Missouri, U.S.
- Died: December 30, 1998 (aged 97); Gloucester, Massachusetts, U.S.
- Education: School of Fine Arts, Washington University in St. Louis; Pennsylvania Academy of the Fine Arts; American Academy in Rome
- Notable work: Pennsylvania Railroad World War II Memorial; James Madison, Library of Congress; Soldiers' Memorial, St. Louis, Missouri
- Style: Monumental sculptures
- Awards: National Medal of Arts (1989); Presidential Medal of Freedom (1990)

Walker Kirtland Hancock (June 28, 1901 – December 30, 1998) was an American sculptor and teacher. He created notable monumental sculptures, including the World War I Soldiers' Memorial (1936–1938) in St. Louis, Missouri; and the Pennsylvania Railroad World War II Memorial (1950–1952) at 30th Street Station in Philadelphia, Pennsylvania. He made major additions to the National Cathedral in Washington, D.C., including Christ in Majesty (1972), the bas relief over the High Altar. Works by him are in the collections of the United States Military Academy at West Point, New York; the Library of Congress; the United States Supreme Court Building; and the United States Capitol.

During World War II, Hancock was one of the Monuments Men, who recovered art treasures looted by the Nazis. Congress awarded him the National Medal of Arts in 1989, and President George H. W. Bush awarded him the Presidential Medal of Freedom in 1990.

== Education and early career ==
External videos
- Interview with Walker Hancock (1989), National Sculpture Society, via YouTube.

He was born in St. Louis, Missouri, the son of Walter Scott Hancock, a lawyer, and wife Anna Spencer. He had four younger sisters, and attended St. Louis public schools and Central High School. From age 14, he attended Wednesday night and all-day Saturday classes at the St. Louis School of Fine Arts at Washington University in St. Louis. He graduated from high school in 1919, and spent the summer taking classes at the University of Wisconsin–Madison. He enrolled at Washington University in the fall, and the following summer worked as an assistant to his teacher, Victor Holm, helping to complete the sculpture program for the Missouri State Monument at Vicksburg National Military Park. In Fall 1920, Hancock transferred to the Pennsylvania Academy of Fine Arts in Philadelphia, Pennsylvania, to study under Charles Grafly.

As a first-year student at PAFA, he won the 1921 Edmund Stewardson Prize. The following two years he won 1922 and 1923 Cresson Traveling Scholarships, enabling him to travel to Europe. His Bust of Toivo (1924, Museum of Fine Arts, Boston; Cape Ann Museum, Gloucester, MA) was awarded PAFA's 1925 George D. Widener Memorial Gold Medal.

Bust of Toivo was Hancock's submission for the 1925 Rome Prize, and he was one of the thirty painters, sculptors and architects selected as winners. He spent the next four years studying at the American Academy in Rome.

Hancock returned to Philadelphia from Rome in late-April, 1929, only to learn that Charles Grafly had been gravely injured in an automobile accident the night before. On his deathbed, Grafly asked Hancock to succeed him as PAFA's Instructor of Sculpture. Hancock held that position from 1929 to 1967, with interruptions for his war service and two years as sculptor-in-residence at the American Academy in Rome (1956–58).

== World War II ==
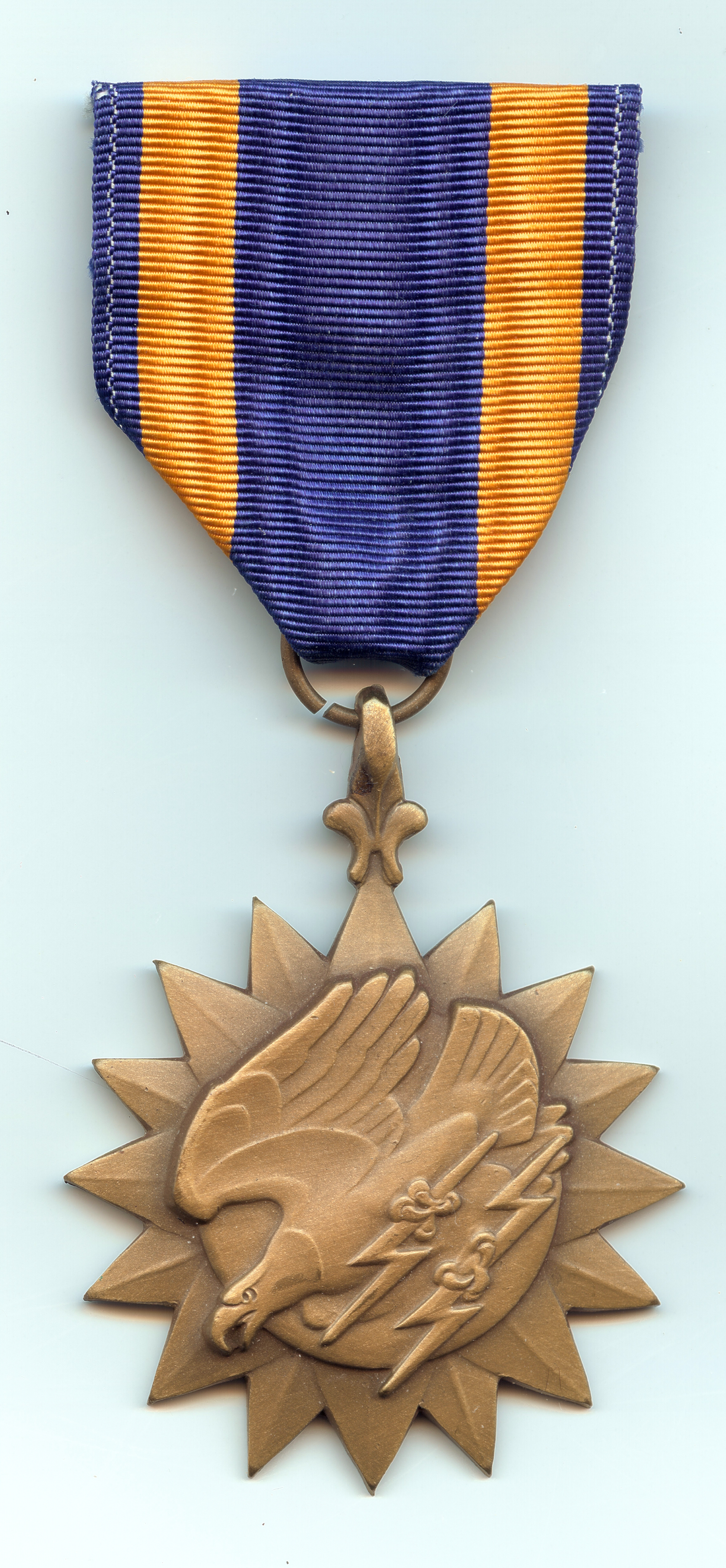
Air Medal (1942)

Because Hancock spoke fluent Italian, he was recruited into U.S. Army intelligence, where he wrote a handbook for soldiers serving in Italy. Hancock won the national competition to design the Air Medal (1942), established by President Franklin D. Roosevelt, to honor "any person who, while serving in any capacity in the Army, Navy, Marine Corps or Coast Guard of the United States subsequent to September 8, 1939, distinguishes, or has distinguished, himself by meritorious achievement while participating in an aerial flight."

On December 4, 1943, three weeks before being shipped overseas, Hancock and Saima Natti (1905–1984) were married in a chapel at the National Cathedral in Washington, D.C. Later, he would make major additions to the cathedral, including the altarpiece for the Good Shepherd Chapel (1957); half-life-size statues of Ulrich Zwingli (1965) and Martin Luther (1967); Christ in Majesty (1972), the bas relief over the High Altar; and a heroic-sized bronze statue of Abraham Lincoln (1984).

=== Monuments men ===
Hancock was posted to London in early 1944, where he researched and wrote reports on monuments and art works in occupied France.

"He was one of 10 officers sent to the continent after D-Day to implement the Allied Expeditionary Force's policy to avoid, wherever military exigency would permit, damage to structures, documents or other items of historical or artistic importance and to prevent further deterioration of those already damaged. With personnel and equipment for this seemingly hopeless task in short supply, Captain Hancock had to rely on his ingenuity, resourcefulness, and extensive knowledge of European cultural history to rescue countless treasures from dampness, fire, weather and the depredations of looters and troops requiring billets."

Immediately following the May 8, 1945 German surrender, Hancock set up the first so-called Central Collecting Point, in the city of Marburg. Under his leadership, tens of thousands of artworks, books and documents were inventoried and temporarily stored, mainly in the Marburg State Archives. For photographic documentation of the works, he cooperated with the Bildarchiv Foto Marburg.

To protest the "Westward Ho" operation, in which some 200 German-owned masterpiece paintings were shipped to the National Gallery of Art in Washington, D.C., potentially permanently, he resigned his position in the late fall of 1945 and returned to the United States.

== Personal ==
Hancock became Charles Grafly's protégé, and worked as his summer studio assistant at "Fool's Paradise," Grafly's home in the Lanesville section of Gloucester, Massachusetts. Following Grafly's 1929 death, Hancock purchased "Deep Hole," a Lanesville abandoned granite quarry and a popular swimming hole for local quarrymen, a number of whom became his models.

He began building a house/studio on the quarry property in 1930. The house/studio seems to have been habitable by 1936, when Hancock first listed "Lanesville, Mass." as his address in the catalogue of PAFA's annual exhibition. Grafly had been able to commute to teach at PAFA, taking an early train from Gloucester to Boston, then another for the long trip from Boston to Philadelphia. Hancock did the same, with Mondays and Fridays as travel days, while sleeping in a Philadelphia rented room during the work week.

Hancock met a Gloucester schoolteacher, Saima Natti, the sister of one of his models, who would become his wife in 1943. Their daughter Saima Deane was born in 1947.

Saima Natti Hancock, his wife of 40 years, died in 1984.

Hancock retired to Lanesville, where he died on December 30, 1998.

== Works ==
=== Zuni Bird Charmer ===
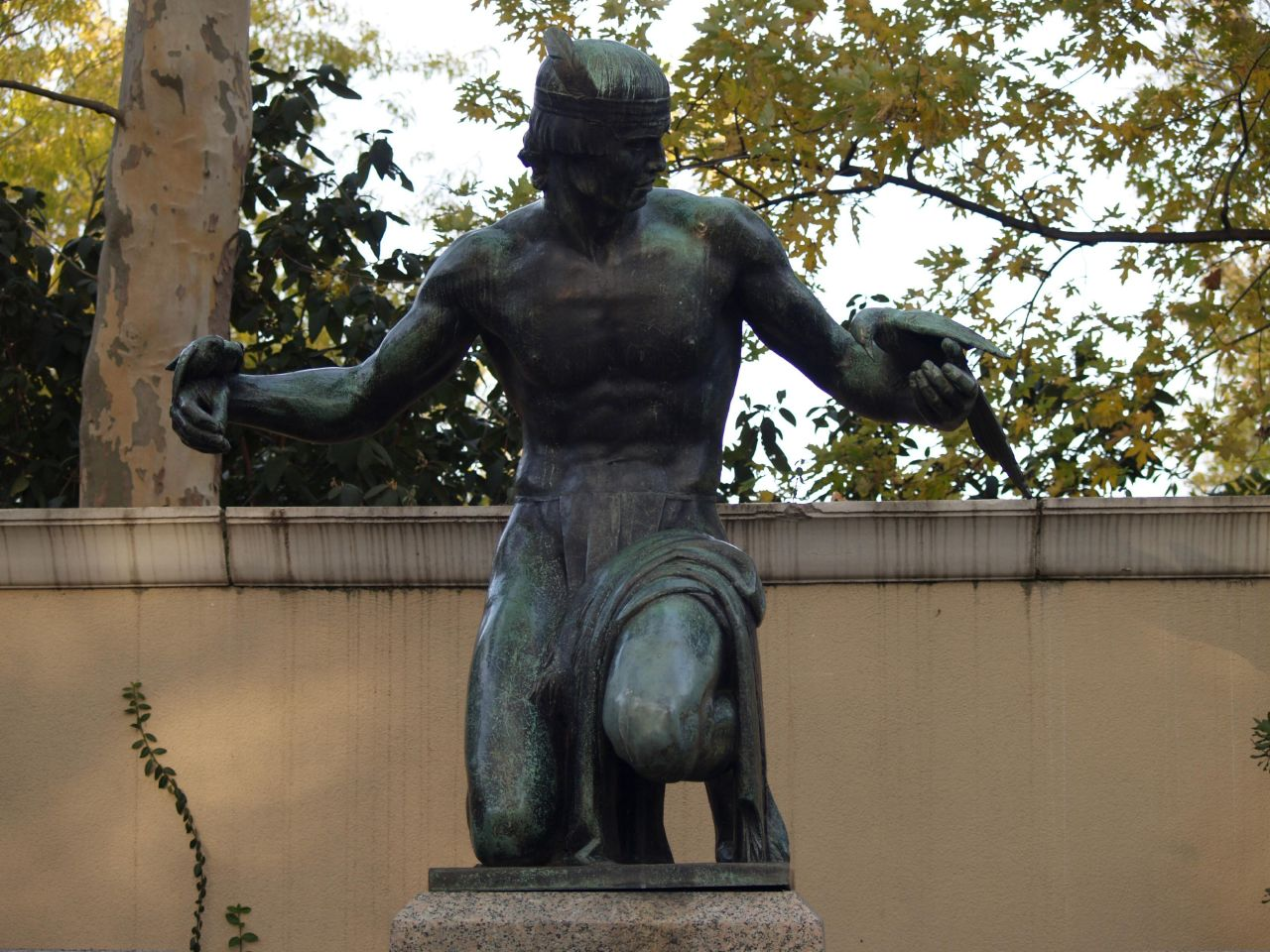
Zuni Bird Charmer (1931), St. Louis Zoo

Hancock's first major commission was the Jessie Tennille Maschmeyer Memorial Fountain (1931–32) for the St. Louis Zoo. A drinking fountain featuring a pedestal flanked by twin basins, the severe Art Deco-Pueblo architecture of its granite base served as inspiration for Hancock's central figure, a Zuni Bird Charmer. The larger-than-life-sized figure of a loin-clothed kneeling man with a bird perched on each wrist, won Hancock PAFA's 1932 Fellowship Prize. The fountain is located beside the east entrance to the zoo's Bird House.

=== The Spirit of St. Louis ===
Charles Lindbergh worked as a flight instructor and airmail pilot in St. Louis, Missouri in the 1920s. On May 20–21, 1927, he piloted a locally-built plane, The Spirit of St. Louis, on the first successful solo non-stop trans-Atlantic flight—from Long Island, New York, to Paris, France. This won him the $25,000 Orteig Prize, and made him an international celebrity. Later that year, Lindbergh lent his awards, trophies and memorabilia to the Missouri Historical Society, which exhibited them at the city's Jefferson Memorial Building. Lindberg deeded the collection to the historical society in 1935, and in 1941 commissioned Hancock to create a work honoring those who had sponsored and built The Spirit of St. Louis. Hancock's marble bas-relief plaque – an allegorical figure of Louis IX of France (Saint Louis) launching a falcon into flight – was installed at the Missouri History Museum in 1942.

=== Pennsylvania Railroad World War II Memorial ===
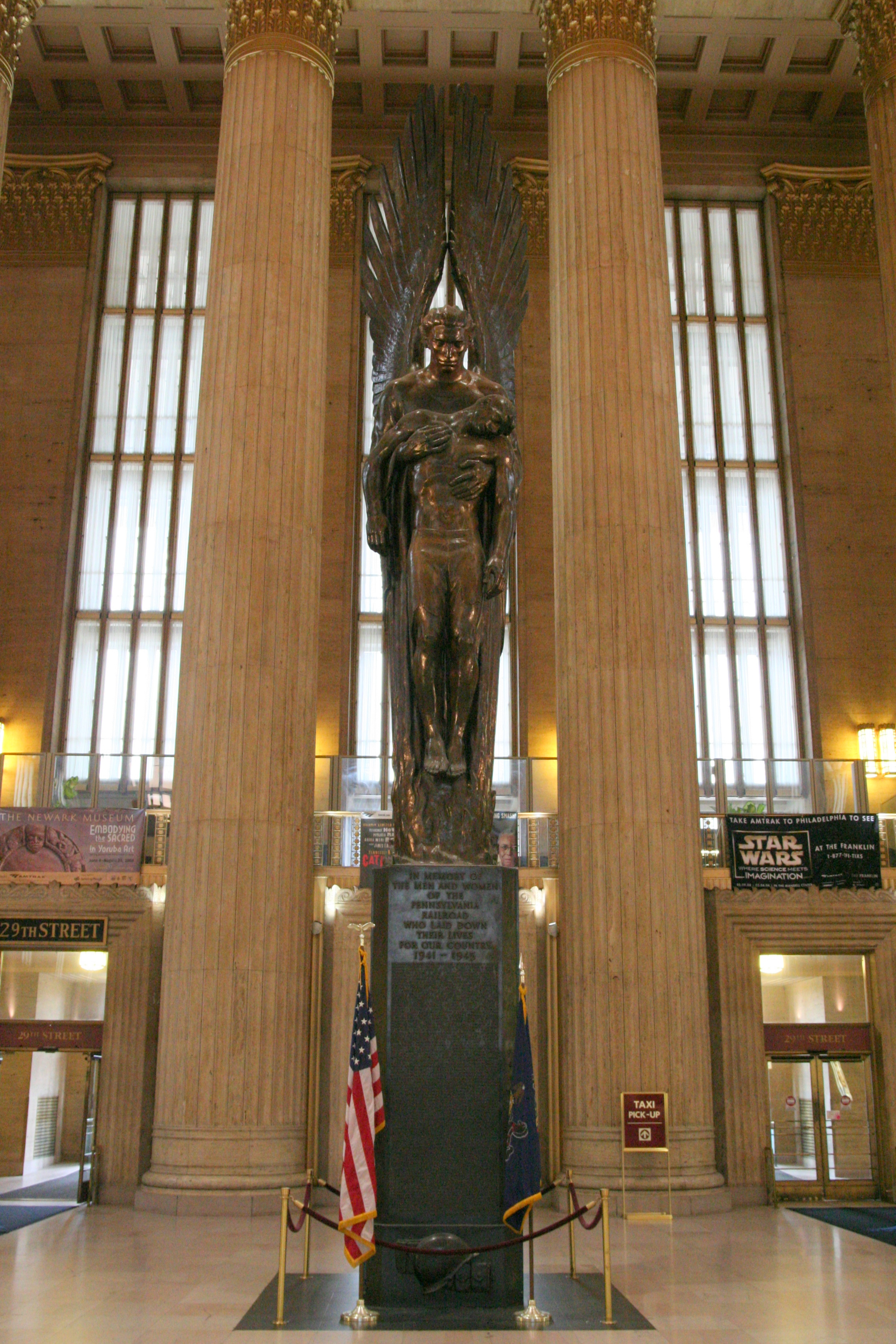
Angel of the Resurrection (1950-1952), Pennsylvania Railroad World War II Memorial, 30th Street Station in Philadelphia

Perhaps Hancock's most famous work is the Pennsylvania Railroad World War II Memorial (1950–1952), at 30th Street Station in Philadelphia. The 39-foot (11.9 m) monument is dedicated to the 1,307 PRR employees who died in the war, and their names are listed on bronze panels on its tall, black-granite base. Hancock's heroic bronze, Angel of the Resurrection, depicts Michael the Archangel raising up a fallen soldier from the Flames of War. It was Hancock's favorite of his sculptures.

=== Stone Mountain ===
In 1964, Hancock took over supervision of the Confederate Memorial at Stone Mountain, Georgia. The proposed relief carving, the size of a football field, had been begun in 1917 by Gutzon Borglum. Borglum was dismissed in 1925, and replaced by Augustus Lukeman. (Borglum went on to design and carve Mount Rushmore.) No work had been done since 1928. Hancock simplified Lukeman's model, eliminating the horses' lower bodies and legs, and made design adjustments as problems arose with the carving or stone. Hancock modeled towers to flank the carving, but they were never executed due to lack of money. Roy Faulkner completed the carving of the memorial in 1972.

=== The Garden of Gethsemane ===
Hancock created an immersive sculpture group, The Garden of Gethsemane (1965–66), for Trinity Episcopal Church in Topsfield, Massachusetts. On one side of a garden, a larger-than-life-size kneeling figure seen from behind, Christ Praying, agonizes about offering himself up for crucifixion, while on the other side his disciples, Peter, James, and John, huddle together asleep. The sculpture group was commissioned as a memorial to Jonathan Myrick Daniels, an Episcopal seminarian who was murdered in Alabama in 1965 during the Civil Rights Movement.

A replica of Hancock's 2-part Garden of Gethesemane is at the Abbey of Our Lady of Gethsemani, a Trappist monastery outside Bardstown, Kentucky. A replica of Christ Praying is at Daniels's alma mater, the Episcopal Divinity School in Cambridge, Massachusetts.

In 1991, Jonathan Myrick Daniels was designated a martyr of the Episcopal Church. His day of remembrance is August 14 on the liturgical calendar.

=== James Madison ===
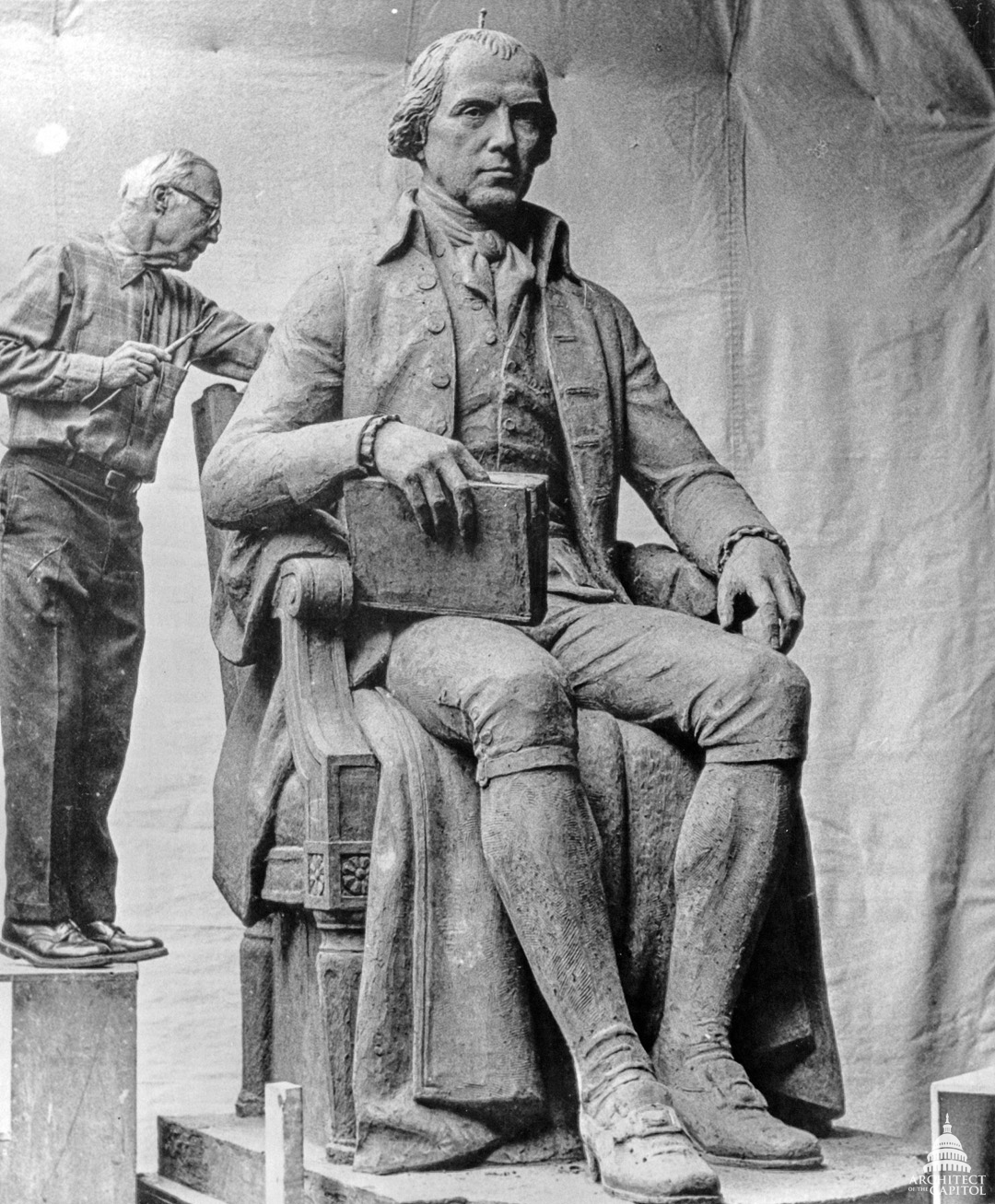
Walker Hancock with his clay model of James Madison, March 1974

Hancock was commissioned in 1971 to create a heroic statue of James Madison, to be the centerpiece of the lobby of the planned James Madison Memorial Building, an expansion of the Library of Congress.

While a delegate to the Congress of the Confederation (1781-89), Madison had advocated for the creation of a congressional library, and submitted a 9-page list of books that should be part of its collection. After the British burned the first congressional library in August 1814, “President Madison approved an act of Congress appropriating $23,590 for the purchase of a large collection of books belonging to Thomas Jefferson,” thus ensuring the congressional library's continuation.

Hancock created a twice-life-size seated figure of Madison, deep in thought, his right index finger marking a page from the Encyclopèdie Mèthodique (Paris, 1783), the first book on Madison’s 1787 list. Hancock modeled Madison in clay in his studio in Lanesville, Massachusetts, and his plaster of Madison was shipped to Pietrasanta, Italy, where local stonecarvers cut it in Carrara marble.

The 4-ton marble statue returned by ship in 1976, encased in a cage of heavy wooden timbers. To set the statue upon its pedestal, workers used rigging to hover the cage over the pedestal. Blocks of ice were inserted between the timbers under the statue's base, and the rigging lowered the statue onto the blocks of ice. The cage was quickly disassembled and removed. Guided by guy-ropes securing it from multiple angles, the statue slowly lowered itself onto the pedestal as the blocks of ice melted.

Hancock's 9-foot-tall James Madison and the James Madison Memorial Building were both formally dedicated on April 24, 1980.

=== List of works ===
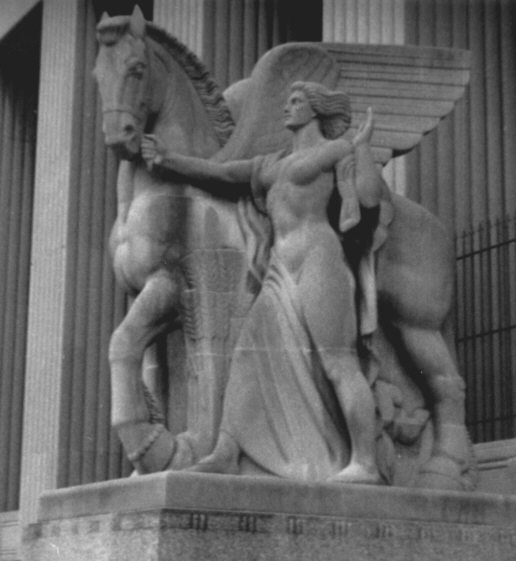
Vision (1936–1938), Soldiers' Memorial, St. Louis, Missouri – one of four monumental sculpture groups that flank the entrances

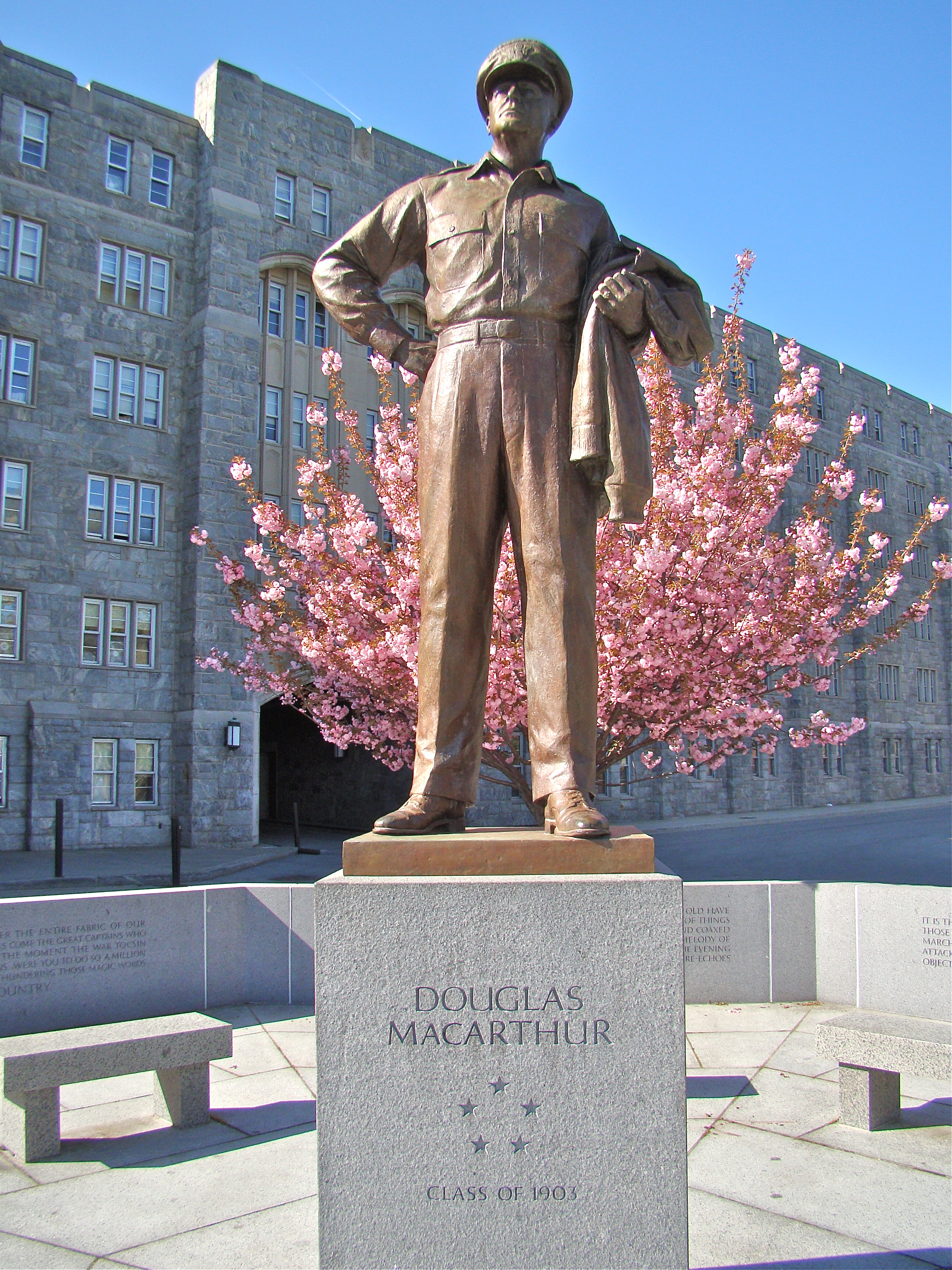
General Douglas MacArthur (1969), United States Military Academy, West Point, New York

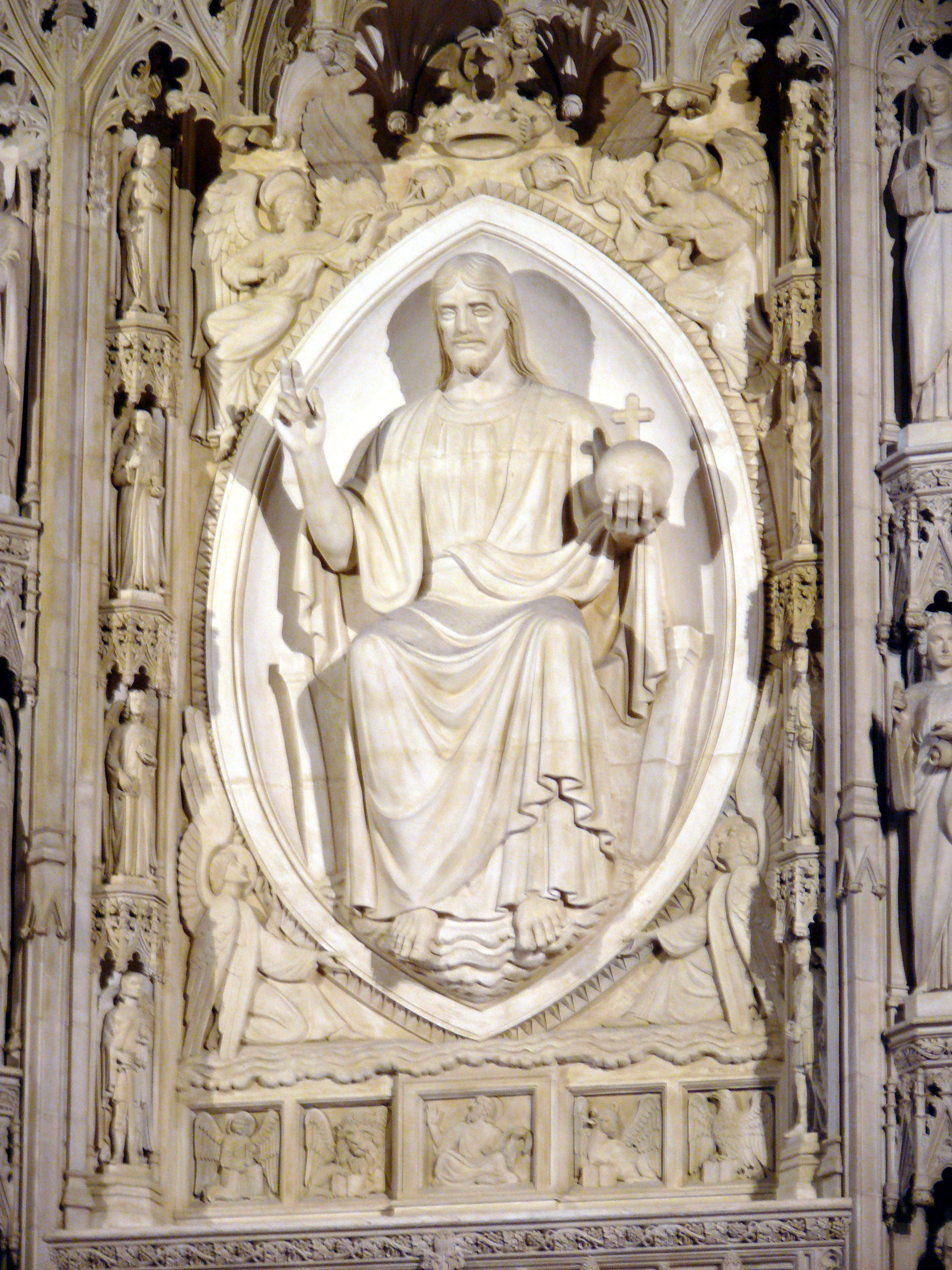
Christ in Majesty (1972), High Altar, National Cathedral, Washington, DC

- Fountain sculpture: Dancing Tritons (bronze, 1928–29), Parrish Art Museum (former building), 25 Jobs Lane, Southampton, Long Island, New York.
- Zuni Bird Charmer (bronze, 1931–32), Bird House, St. Louis Zoo, St. Louis, Missouri.
- Pedimental sculpture group: The Bond of Postal Union (limestone, 1934), Pennsylvania Avenue facade, New Post Office Building (now William Jefferson Clinton Federal Building), Washington, D.C. (with Adolph Alexander Weinman).
- 5 bas relief busts: Beatty, Foch, Pershing, Diaz, Jacques, (bronze, 1934–35), Liberty Memorial, National World War I Monument, Kansas City, Missouri.
- Architectural sculpture, 5 bas relief panels: The Round Up, First Plowing, Coming of the Railroad, Pioneer Founders, River Traffic (limestone, 1936), north façade, Kansas City City Hall, Kansas City, Missouri.
- 4 monumental sculpture groups: Vision, Courage, Sacrifice, Loyalty (granite, 1936–1938), Soldiers' Memorial, St. Louis, Missouri.
- Bas relief panel: The Post Rider (marble, 1936–1938), West Springfield Post Office, West Springfield, Massachusetts.
- Bust: Piatt Andrew (bronze, 1938), Museum of Franco-American Cooperation, Blérancourt, France.
  - A replica is at American Friends Service Committee Headquarters in New York City.
- Triton Fountain (plaster, 1938–39, destroyed), 1939 New York World's Fair, Flushing, Queens, New York City.
  - A one-third-scale bronze version of one of the triton figures is at Elizabeth Gordon Smith Park, Gloucester, Massachusetts.
- Head of a Finnish Boy (terracotta, 1939), Cape Ann Museum, Cape Ann, Massachusetts. Waino E. Natti, later Hancock's brother-in-law, was the model.
  - Head of a Finnish Boy (terracotta, 1939, this cast 1957), Pennsylvania Academy of the Fine Arts. Hancock's plaster model was lent to PAFA in 1957, and accidentally destroyed while on display. Hancock replaced the shattered bust with a terracotta replica.
- Judge Charles Lincoln Brown (marble, 1940), Philadelphia Municipal Courthouse, 1801 Vine Street, Philadelphia, Pennsylvania.
- Bust: Stephen Collins Foster (bronze, 1941), Hall of Fame for Great Americans, Bronx, New York City.
- Frank P. Brown Medal (bronze, 1941), awarded by the Franklin Institute, Philadelphia, Pennsylvania.
- Bas relief plaque: The Spirit of St. Louis (marble, 1941–42), Missouri History Museum, St. Louis, Missouri. Hancock's allegory for Charles Lindbergh's 1927 flight across the Atlantic Ocean features Saint Louis (King Louis IX of France) launching the flight of a falcon.
- Air Medal (1942).
- World War II Memorial Tablet (bronze, 1947–1949), Central High School, St. Louis, Missouri. Inscription: "Central High School: To Those Who Gave Their Lives For Their Country, 1941–1945."
- Bust: Robert Frost (bronze, 1950), Museum of Fine Arts, Boston, Boston, Massachusetts.
- Angel of the Resurrection (bronze, 1950–1952), Pennsylvania Railroad World War II Memorial, 30th Street Station, Philadelphia, Pennsylvania
  - Hancock's one-third-scale plaster model is at the Museum of Fine Arts, Boston.
- President Dwight David Eisenhower Inaugural Medal (gold, 1953), Corcoran Gallery of Art, Washington, D.C.
  - Hancock also created the 1957 inaugural medal, which features profiles of both President Eisenhower and Vice-president Richard M. Nixon.
- John Joseph Eagan (bronze, 1953–1955), American Cast Iron Pipe Company, Birmingham, Alabama.
- Relief bust: Andrew W. Mellon (marble, 1954), National Gallery of Art, Washington, D.C.
- Bust: Woodrow Wilson (bronze, 1956), Hall of Fame for Great Americans, the Bronx, New York City
- Bust: Governor Percival P. Baxter (bronze, 1956), Maine State House, Augusta, Maine
- Bas relief panel: World War II and Korean War Memorial (1957), Loudon County Courthouse, Leesburg, Virginia
- John Paul Jones (bronze, 1957), William M. Reilly Memorial, Philadelphia Museum of Art Sculpture Garden, Philadelphia, Pennsylvania
- The Good Shepherd (Istrian stone, 1957), Bowker Memorial Fountain, All Saints Episcopal Church, Worcester, Massachusetts
  - In 1995, Hancock donated a bronze version to St. Mary's Episcopal Church, Rockport, Massachusetts, as a memorial to his wife
- Architectural sculpture: Three Angels with Palm Branches (limestone, 1959–60), Military Chapel, Lorraine American Cemetery and Memorial, Saint-Avold, France. Carved by M. Juge.
- Vice President Alben W. Barkley (bronze, 1960–1963), Kentucky State Capitol, Lexington, Kentucky
- Paul Weeks Litchfield, (bronze, 1961), Goodyear Tire and Rubber Company, Akron, Ohio
- Confederate Memorial (granite, 1917–1972), Stone Mountain, Georgia. Hancock supervised its completion, 1964–1972.
- The Garden of Gethsemane (bronze, 1965–66), Trinity Church, Topsfield, Massachusetts
  - A replica is at The Abbey of Our Lady of Gethsemani, Bardstown, Kentucky
  - A replica of Christ Praying is at the Episcopal Divinity School, Cambridge, Massachusetts.
- Air (bronze, 1978–1982), Fairmount Park, Philadelphia, Pennsylvania
- Arion on a Dolphin (bronze, 1989), Dunn Tower, Methodist Hospital, Houston, Texas.
- Bust: W. E. B. DuBois (marble, 1993), Memorial Hall, Harvard University, Cambridge, Massachusetts

==== United States Military Academy (West Point) ====
- General Douglas MacArthur (bronze, 1969), MacArthur Monument (West Point). A duplicate of this is at the MacArthur Memorial, Norfolk, Virginia
- Bust: General Leslie R. Groves (bronze, 1975).
- Flight Memorial (bronze, 1992).

==== Washington National Cathedral ====
- Christ the Good Shepherd Altarpiece (limestone, 1957), Good Shepherd Chapel. Carved by Roger Morigi.
- Niche figure of Ulrich Zwingli (limestone, 1965). Carved by Roger Morigi.
- Niche figure of Martin Luther (limestone, 1967). Carved by Roger Morigi.
- Christ in Majesty (limestone, 1972), bas relief over the High Altar. Carved by Roger Morigi (with Frank Zic).
- Statue of Abraham Lincoln (bronze, 1984), west end of the Nave

==== Library of Congress ====
- Bust: Stephen Foster (marble, 1951–52), James Madison Memorial Building. Hancock designed the bust in the style of an antebellum sculptor such as Hiram Powers, and carved it in marble himself.
- James Madison (twice-life-size seated figure, marble, 1974–1976), James Madison Memorial Building.

==== United States Supreme Court Building ====
- Bust: Chief-Justice Earl Warren (marble, 1977)
- Bust: Chief-Justice Warren E. Burger (marble, 1983)
  - Bronze versions of this are at the National Portrait Gallery, the Minnesota State Capitol, the Swem Library at the College of William and Mary, and elsewhere

==== United States Capitol ====
- Bust: Vice-President Hubert H. Humphrey, Jr. (marble, 1981–82)
- Bust: Vice-President Gerald R. Ford (marble, 1984–85)
  - Replicas at Gerald R. Ford Presidential Museum, Grand Rapids, Michigan; Lyndon Baines Johnson Presidential Library, Austin, Texas; and elsewhere
- Bust: Vice-President George H. W. Bush (marble, 1990–91)
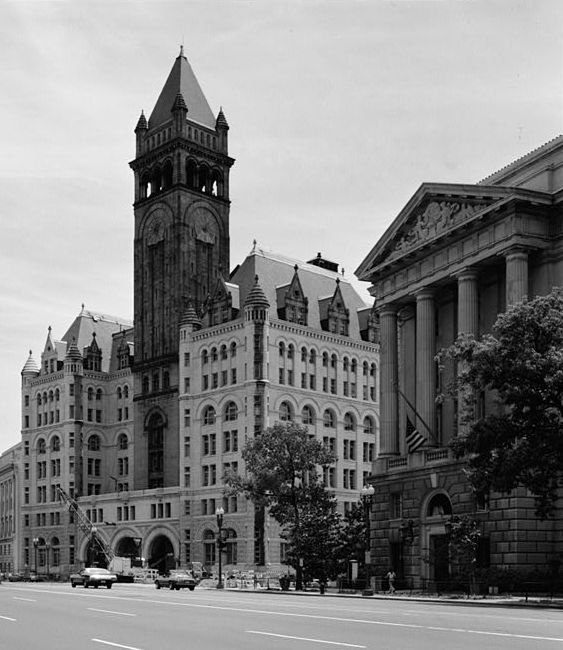
At upper right: The Bond of Postal Union pediment (1934), New Post Office Building (now part of the William Jefferson Clinton Federal Building), Washington, D.C.

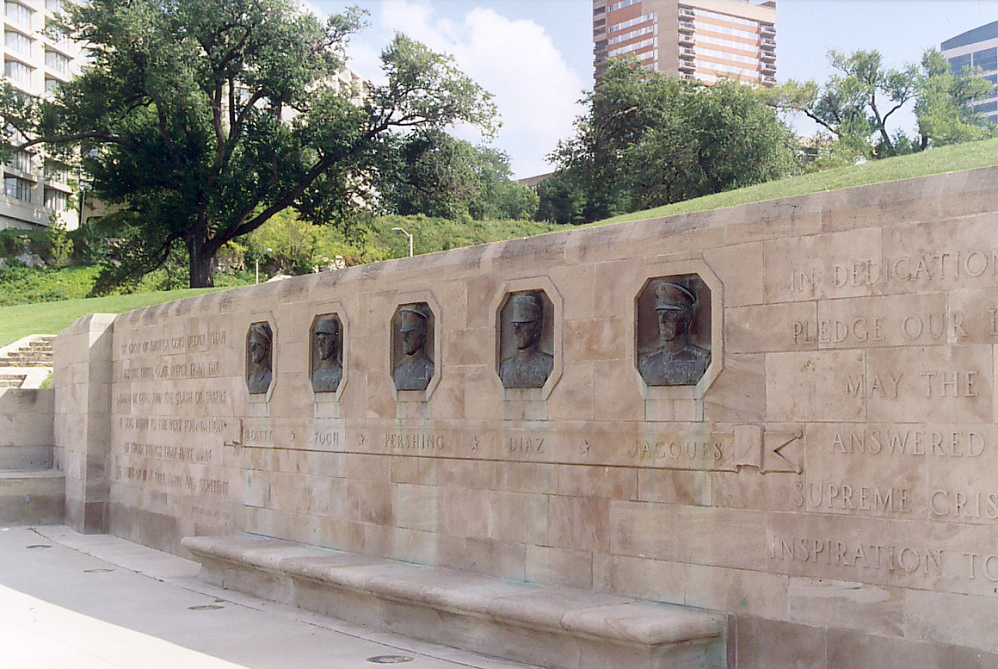
Bas relief busts (1934–35), Liberty Memorial, Kansas City, Missouri

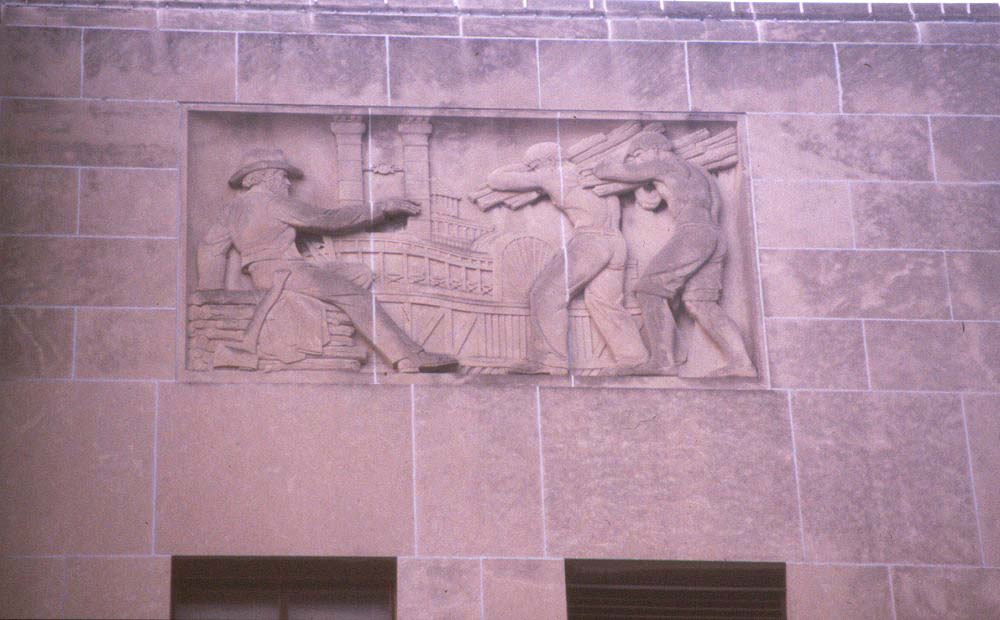
River Traffic (1936), Kansas City City Hall, Missouri.

John Paul Jones (1957), Philadelphia Museum of Art Sculpture Garden, Philadelphia, Pennsylvania

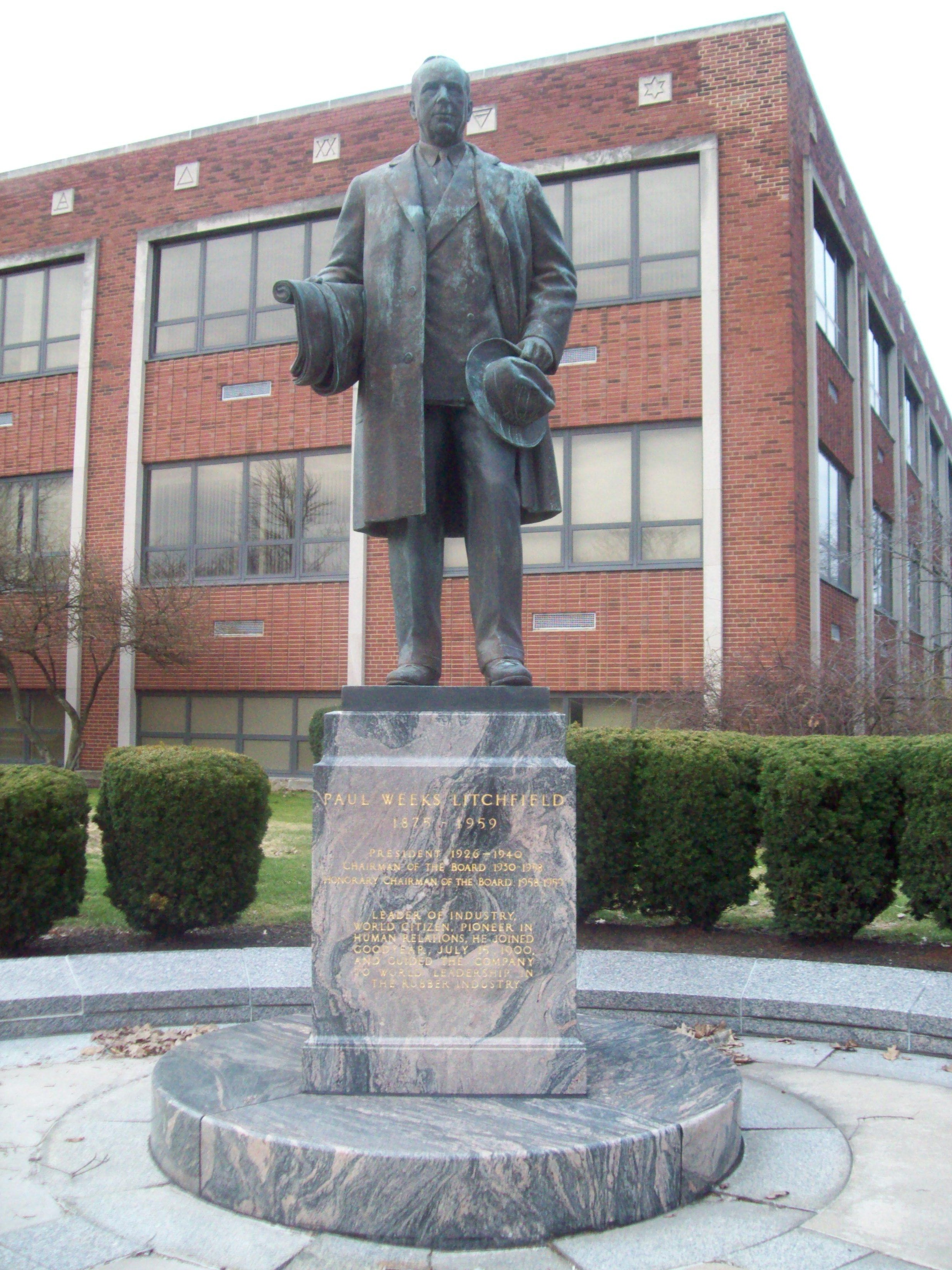
Paul Weeks Litchfield (1961), Goodyear Tire and Rubber Company, Akron, Ohio

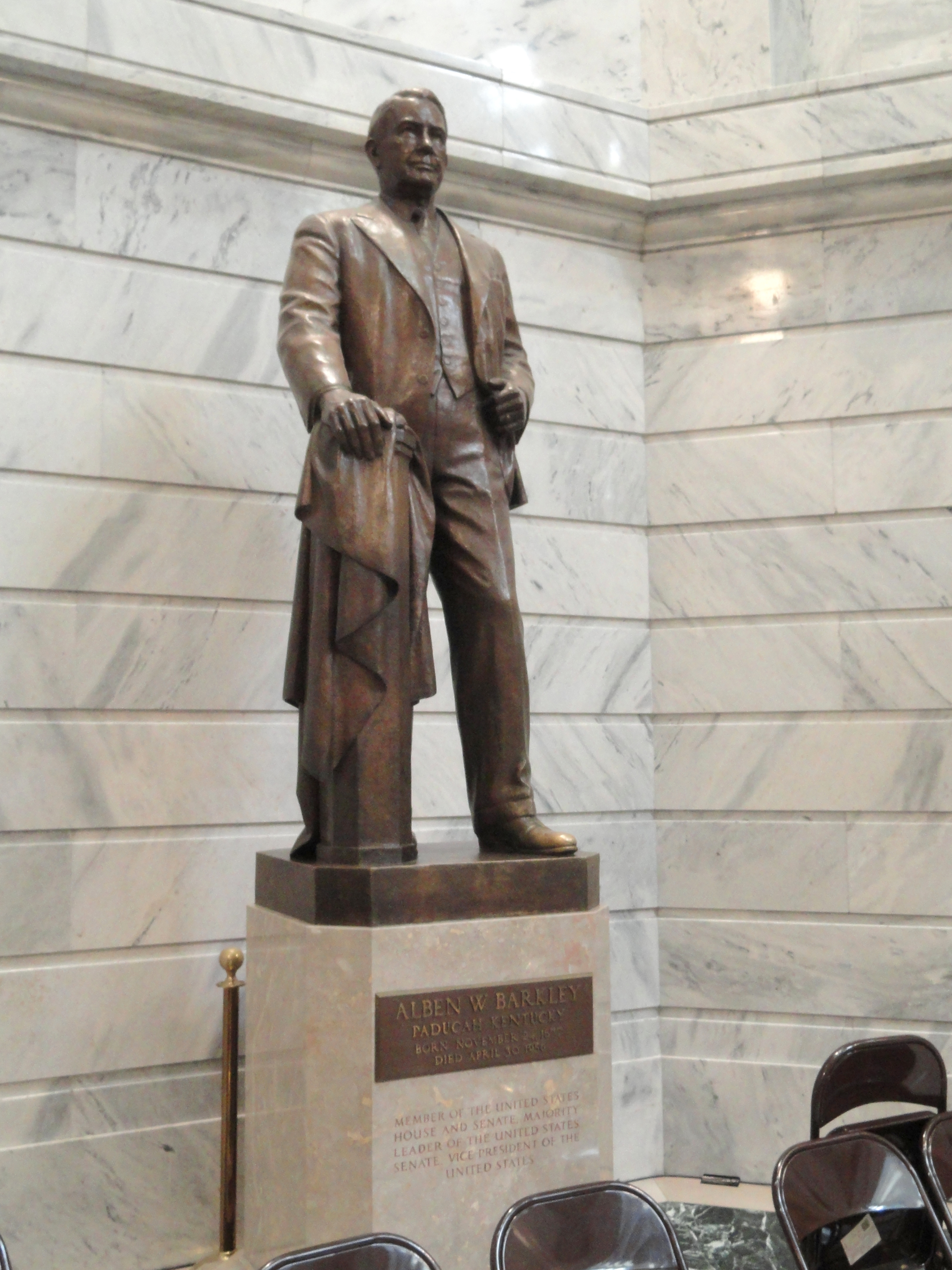
Vice President Alben W. Barkley (1960–1963), Kentucky State Capitol.

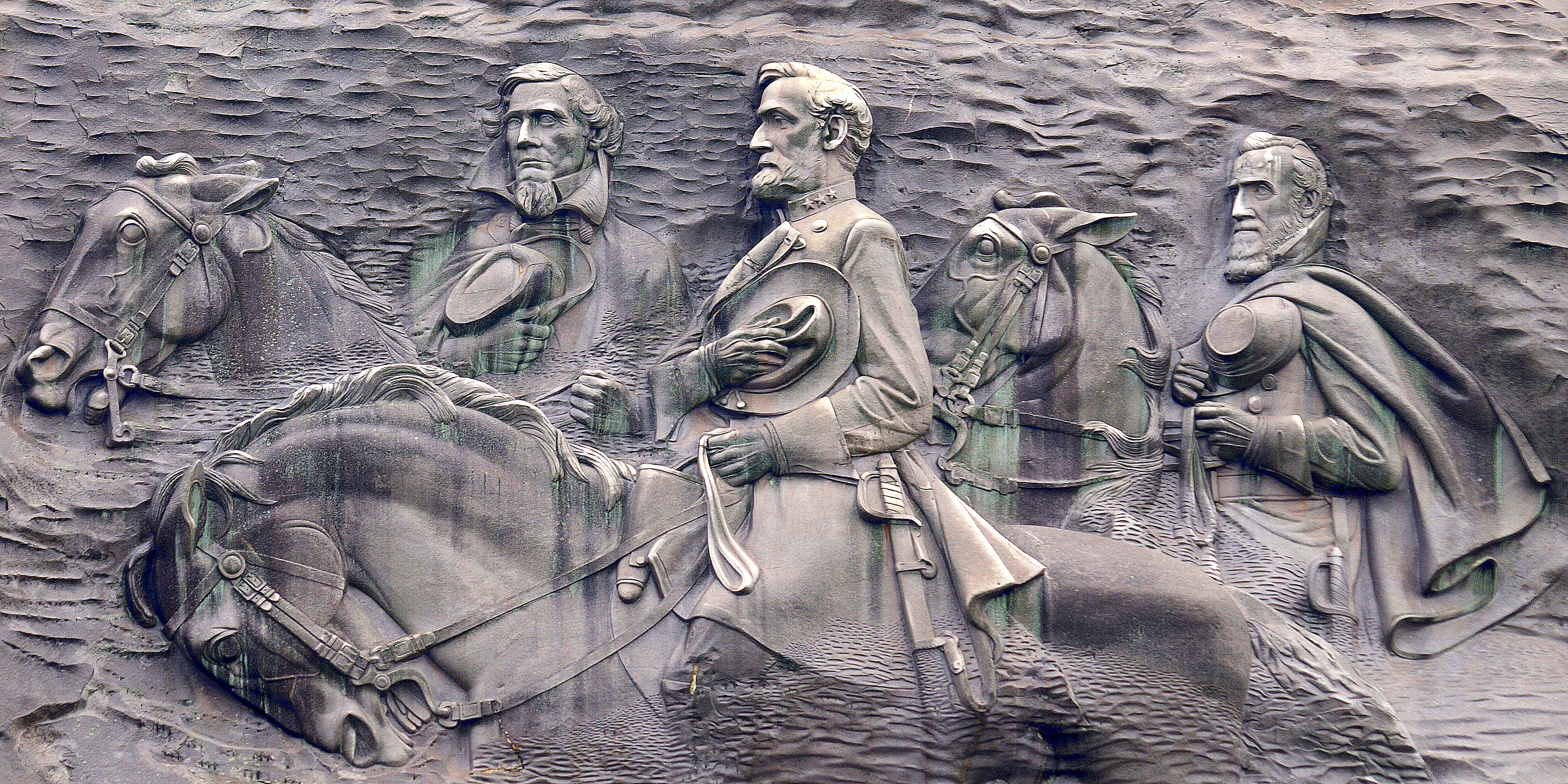
Confederate Memorial (1917–1972), Stone Mountain, Georgia. Hancock supervised its completion, 1964–1972

James Madison Memorial (1971-1980), James Madison Memorial Building, Library of Congress, Washington, D.C.

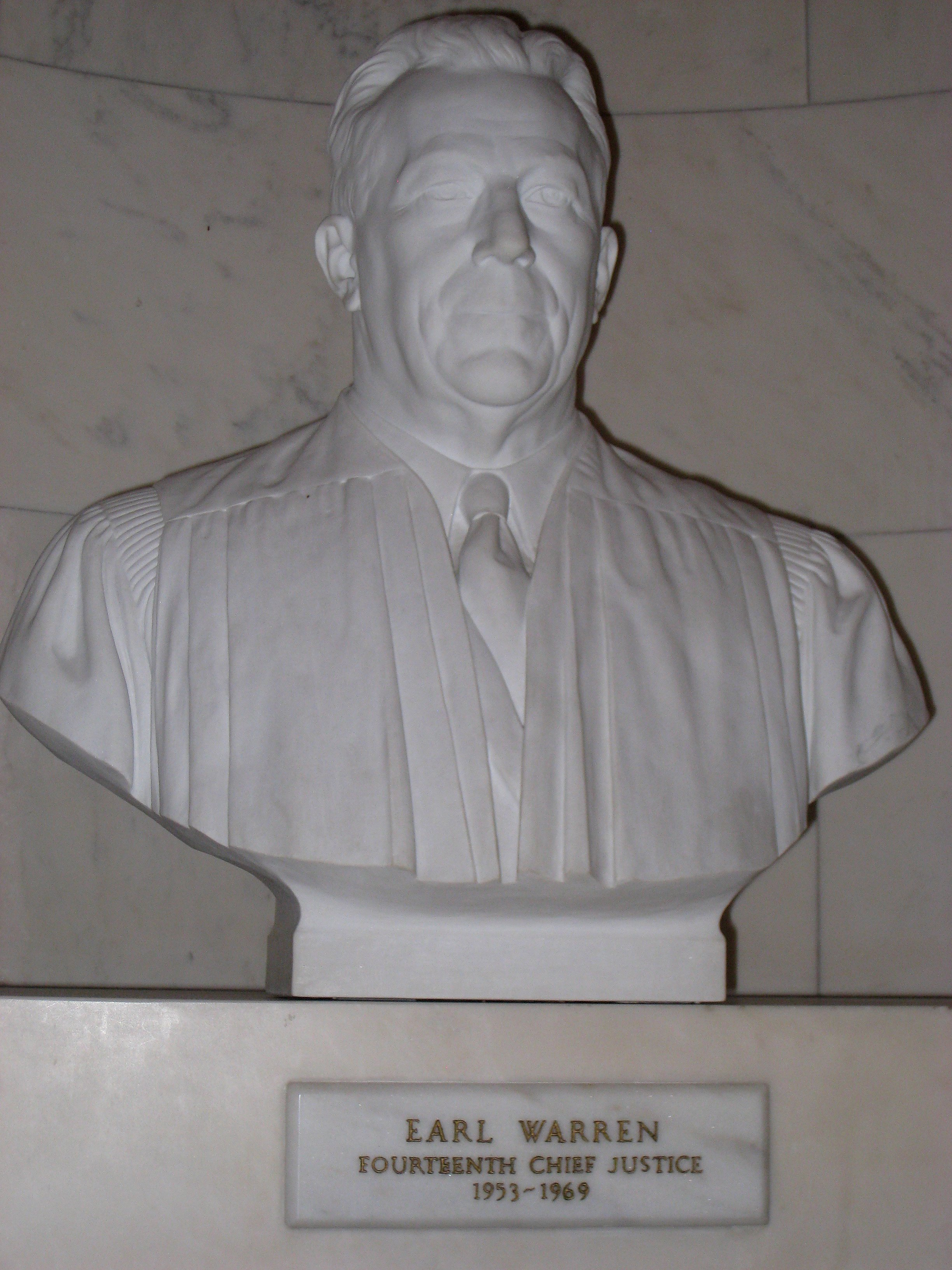
Chief Justice Earl Warren (1977), U.S. Supreme Court Building, Washington, D.C.

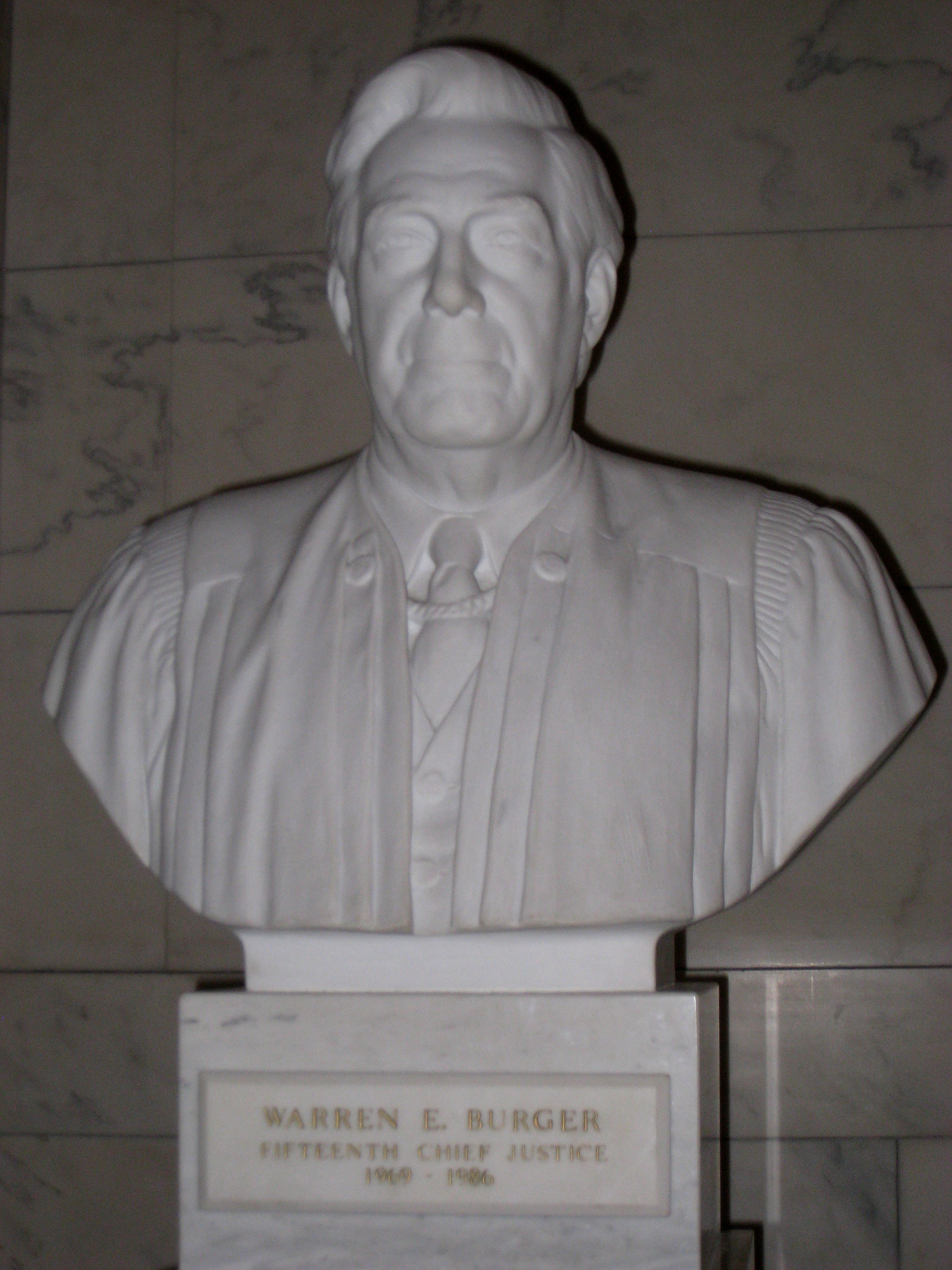
Chief Justice Warren E. Burger (1983), U.S. Supreme Court Building, Washington, D.C.

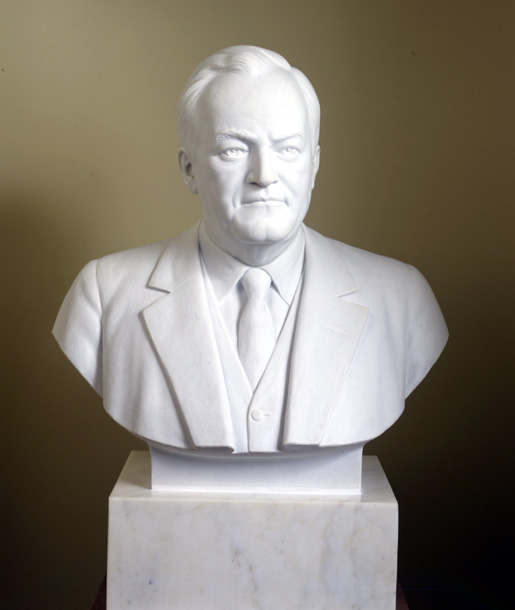
Hubert H. Humphrey (1982), United States Senate Vice Presidential Bust Collection, U.S. Capitol

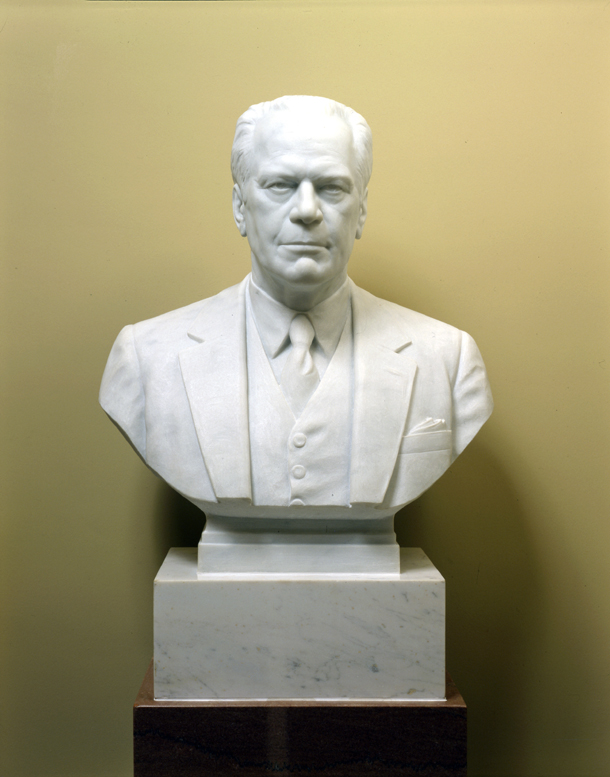
Gerald R. Ford (1985), United States Senate Vice Presidential Bust Collection, U.S. Capitol

== Honors ==
Hancock's sculpture was part of the art competition at the 1932 Summer Olympics in Los Angeles, California.

Hancock was elected an Associate member of the National Academy of Design in 1936, and an Academician in 1939. He was inducted into the American Academy of Arts and Letters in 1941.

For his military service, Hancock was awarded the American Campaign Medal, the World War II Victory Medal, and the European-African-Middle Eastern Campaign Medal.

Hancock served as a member of the Smithsonian Institution's National Collection of Fine Arts Commission. For his body of work, he was awarded the Pennsylvania Academy of the Fine Arts' Medal of Honor in 1953, and the National Sculpture Society's Herbert Adams Medal of Honor in 1954.

In 1971, Hancock received the Golden Plate Award of the American Academy of Achievement.

The U.S. Congress awarded Hancock the National Medal of Arts in 1989. President George H. W. Bush awarded him the Medal of Freedom in 1990.

In 2025, the Cape Ann Museum in Gloucester, Massachusetts hosted the exhibition Portrait of a Sculptor—Walker Hancock / Michael Lafferty. Michael Lafferty had been Walker Hancock's friend and photographer for more than 40 years, and the exhibition mixed Lafferty's photographs and commentary with Hancock's sculptures.

== Legacy ==
The Cape Ann Historical Association mounted a 1989 retrospective exhibition of Hancock's work. It later published his autobiography, A Sculptor's Fortunes (1997).

Hancock endowed Massachusetts's Walker Hancock Prize, given for excellence in the arts. The National Sculpture Society has an annual prize named for Hancock.

Hancock's papers are at the Archives of American Art, Smithsonian Institution, and in the Hancock Family Archives in Gloucester, Massachusetts.

Several of Hancock's works can be found at Saint Mary's Episcopal Church, Rockport, Massachusetts. He and his wife are buried nearby at Seaside Cemetery, Gloucester, Massachusetts.

In the 2014 film The Monuments Men, the Sgt. Walter Garfield character played by John Goodman is loosely based on Hancock.
