= Marburg Central Collecting Point =

The Marburg Central Collecting Point, also known as the Marburg Central Art Collecting Point, was the first art depot in Post-World War II Germany. It was established by the U.S. Office of Military Government in the university town of Marburg to collect art looted or evacuated from museums, libraries, archives, castles, etc. before and during World War II and return them to their rightful owners. The Collecting Point existed between May 1945 and mid-August 1946.

== Previous history ==
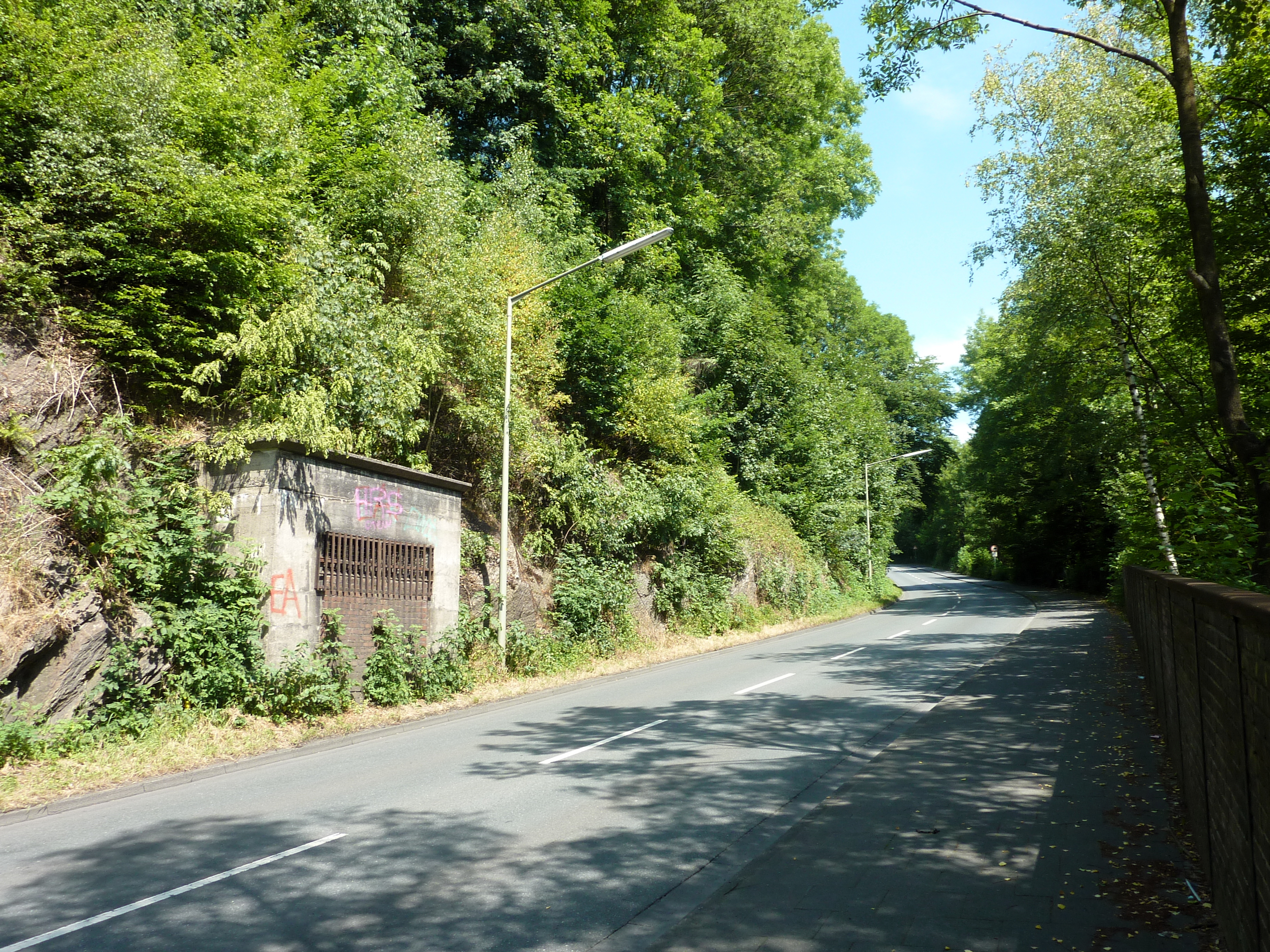
Mouth hole of the Hain mine in Siegen

In 1943, the American government established the American Commission for the Protection and Salvage of Artistic and Historic Monuments in War Areas. This commission, unofficially called the Roberts Commission after its chairman Supreme Court Justice Owen J. Roberts, had lists drawn up of monuments in Europe that were worthy of protection and were to be secured against further damage immediately after the withdrawal of military units. For practical implementation, a special military section called the Monuments, Fine Arts, and Archives program, or MFA&A for short, was founded, whose art protection officers were informally referred to as "Monuments Men" because of their activities. In addition, the unit was to collect the cultural assets that had been looted from the occupied countries, primarily by the Reichsleiter Rosenberg Taskforce, and return them to their original owners.

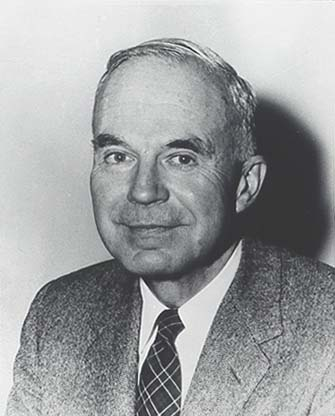
Walker Hancock c. 1960

In the fall of 1944, the first officers following the Allied front line, which was slowly shifting eastward from France, reached German soil. George L. Stout and Walker Hancock became aware of a large cache of artifacts in a former iron ore mine near Siegen during their stay in war-torn Aachen. During their subsequent visit to the Hain mine in early April 1945, the two officers discovered in a separate and guarded room nearly 600 paintings, hundreds of sculptures and other objects that were already attacked by mold due to the prevailing high humidity. To secure the artworks, Stout and Hancock decided to evacuate them as quickly as possible. However, because this was not immediately possible due to the ongoing state of war, they continued their inspection trip.

After a stopover in Marburg, they parted ways. While Stout continued south, Hancock turned east and on April 29, 1945, he discovered in a potash mine in Bernterode, in addition to works of art, the Prussian Crown Jewels, the military standard collection, and the sarcophagi of Frederick the Great, Frederick William I, former German President Paul von Hindenburg and his wife Gertrud. In order to prevent the collection from falling into the hands of the Soviet Union, in whose occupation zone the mine was located, the American military government ordered its immediate evacuation.

== The Marburg Collecting Point ==
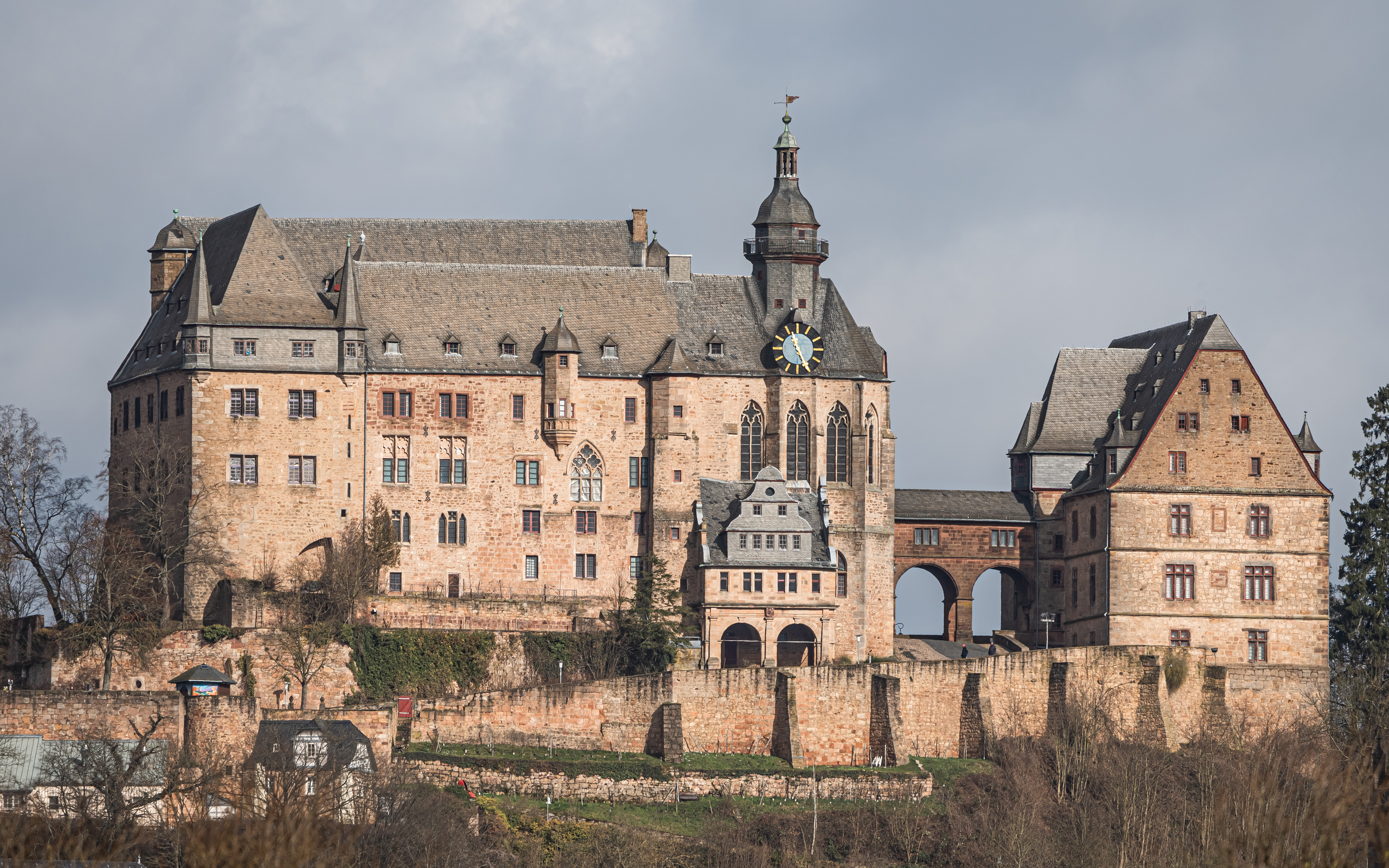
Marburg Castle from south

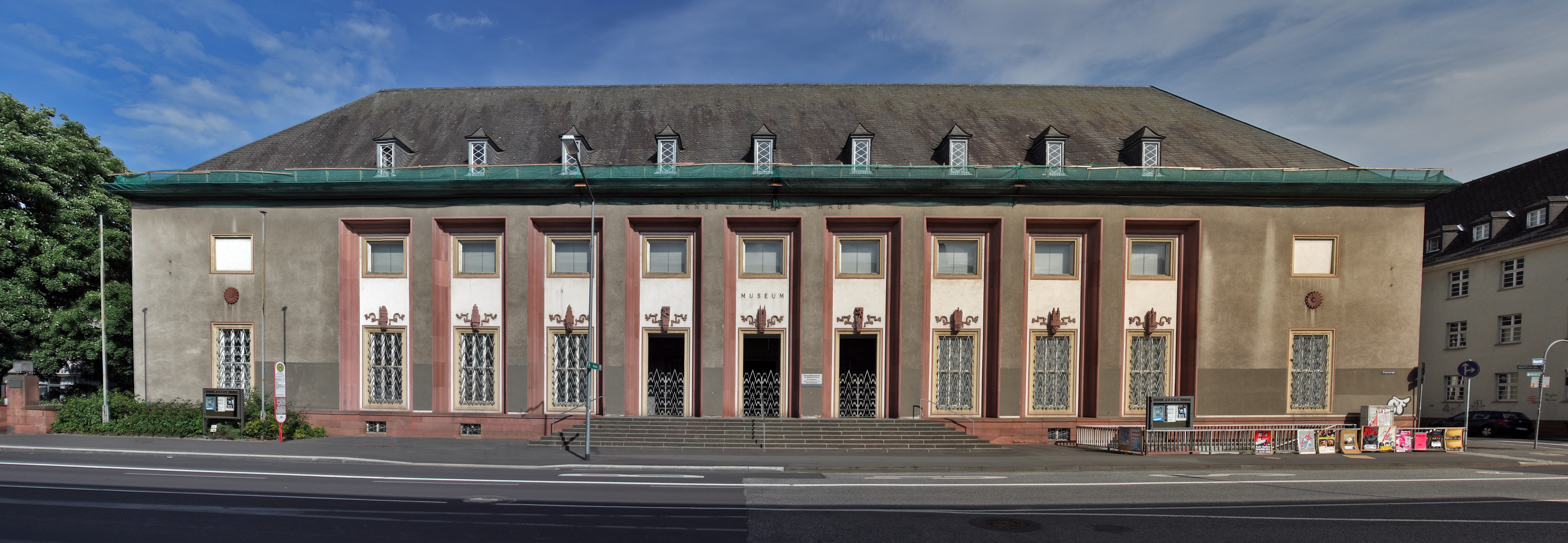
Entrance of the Art Building of the University of Marburg (formerly called "Jubilee Building")

On May 9, 1945, the first objects from the Bernterode depot arrived in Marburg and the Central Collecting Point began its official activities. Several factors were decisive for the choice of the university town in central Hesse: Marburg was located in the American occupation zone, relatively close to other depots in central Germany that were known in the meantime, and had only minor war damage.

Moreover, as early as April 1945, during his inspection tour of Hesse and Thuringia, Hancock had registered three buildings in the city that were suitable for this purpose: The Jubilee building of the university, which is still the seat of the university museum and the institutes of cultural studies together with their collections, the Marburg Castle, and the State Archives, which was inaugurated in 1938. It was there that Hancock set up his office immediately after his return following the unconditional surrender, having had the building occupied by an American military unit vacated and placed "Off Limits."

With the help of the remaining employees of the State Archives and six workers assigned by the employment office, the objects arriving almost daily were magazined. For the inventory of the artworks, Hancock asked for assistance from Richard Hamann, who was both head of the Art history seminar and of the Foto Marburg Bildarchiv (picture archive) and willingly made his staff available. The Art history department was commissioned to prepare index cards for each object and to annotate them with photographs taken by the Bildarchiv. It was Hamann who, together with the mayor of the time, Eugen Siebecke, and the university rector, Julius Ebbinghaus, advocated the organization of an exhibition with the Collecting Point objects to the military government. After the permission was granted, a first exhibition of 30 masterpieces of European painting opened in the University Museum on November 15, 1945. More followed in the museum as well as in the State Archives until the dissolution of the Collecting Point.

To secure the historically significant buildings in Hesse and to provide further support for the collection of objects, Hancock also recruited the working staff of Friedrich Bleibaum, the former provincial conservator of monuments of Hesse. Bleibaum had been active in securing buildings and evacuating valuable Hessian holdings during World War II and remained responsible for these areas on behalf of the Americans, for example, for the works of art he himself had stowed in the bunkers at Bad Wildungen.

=== Objects moved to Marburg and restitution efforts ===
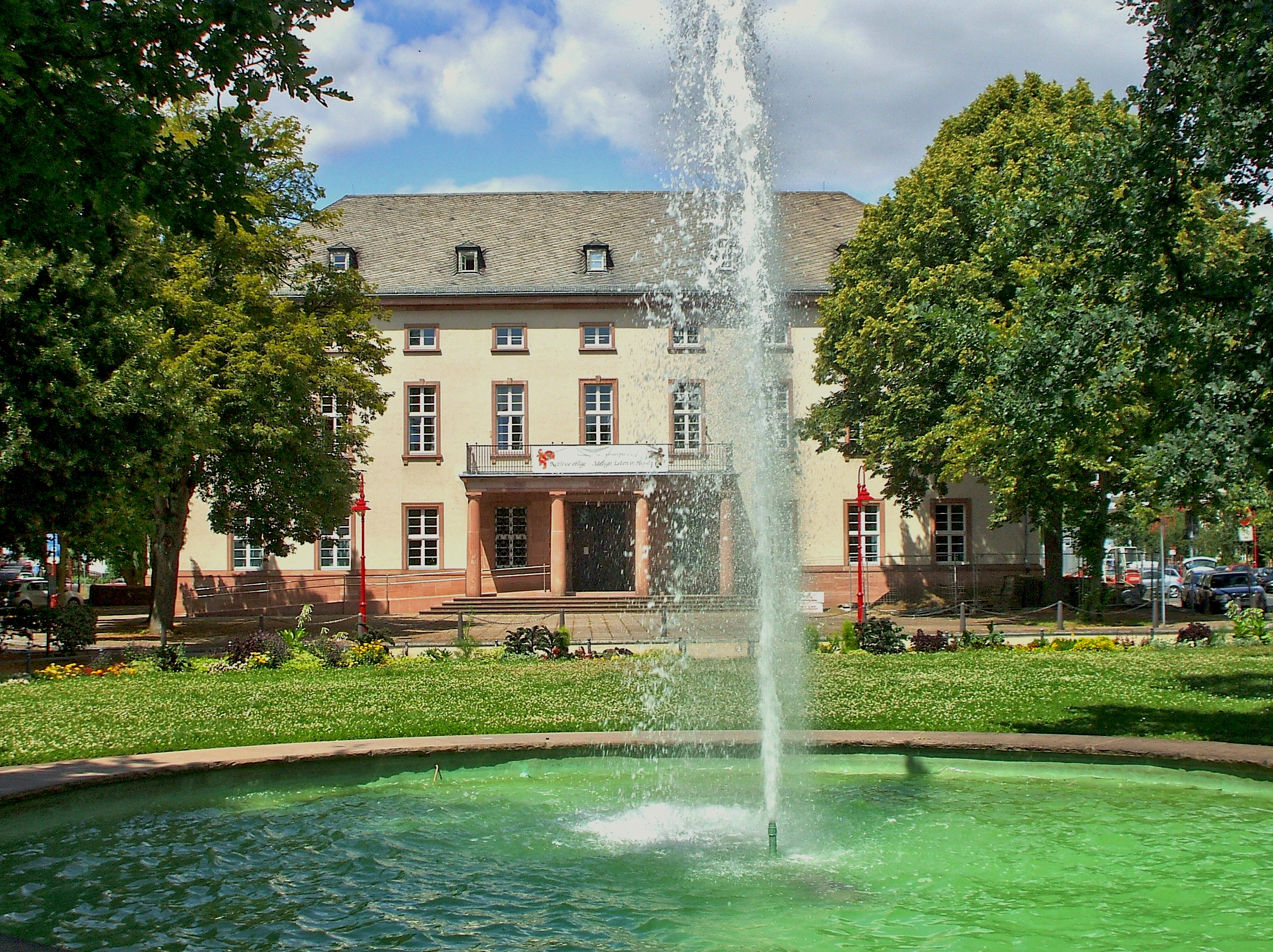
Main entrance of the Marburg State Archives

The most important goal at the Collecting Point was the restitution of the collected holdings, which they primarily suspected to be looted property. For this reason, art protection representatives such as the Belgian Raymond M. Lemaire, the American Edith Standen and the French Rose Valland came to Marburg and sifted through the artworks for suspected looted objects. But contrary to expectations of finding looted objects everywhere in Germany, apparently only a few such objects came to light in Marburg. A total of approximately 200 works, including the treasure from Metz Cathedral, arrived in Marburg from various depots and were returned to their original owners or taken to the Wiesbaden Central Collecting Point for further examination. Due to a lack of personnel and time, no active provenance research could be conducted in Marburg, so that sometimes objects wrongfully acquired by museums or private individuals during Nazism remained undiscovered.

The majority of the more than 4,000 art objects, more than 14,000 books and 17,500 shelf meters of file material came from German museums, churches, archives or private collections, including various Berlin and Rhineland collections, the Museum Folkwang in Essen, the Kunsthalle Düsseldorf etc.

=== Dissolution of the Marburg Collecting Point ===
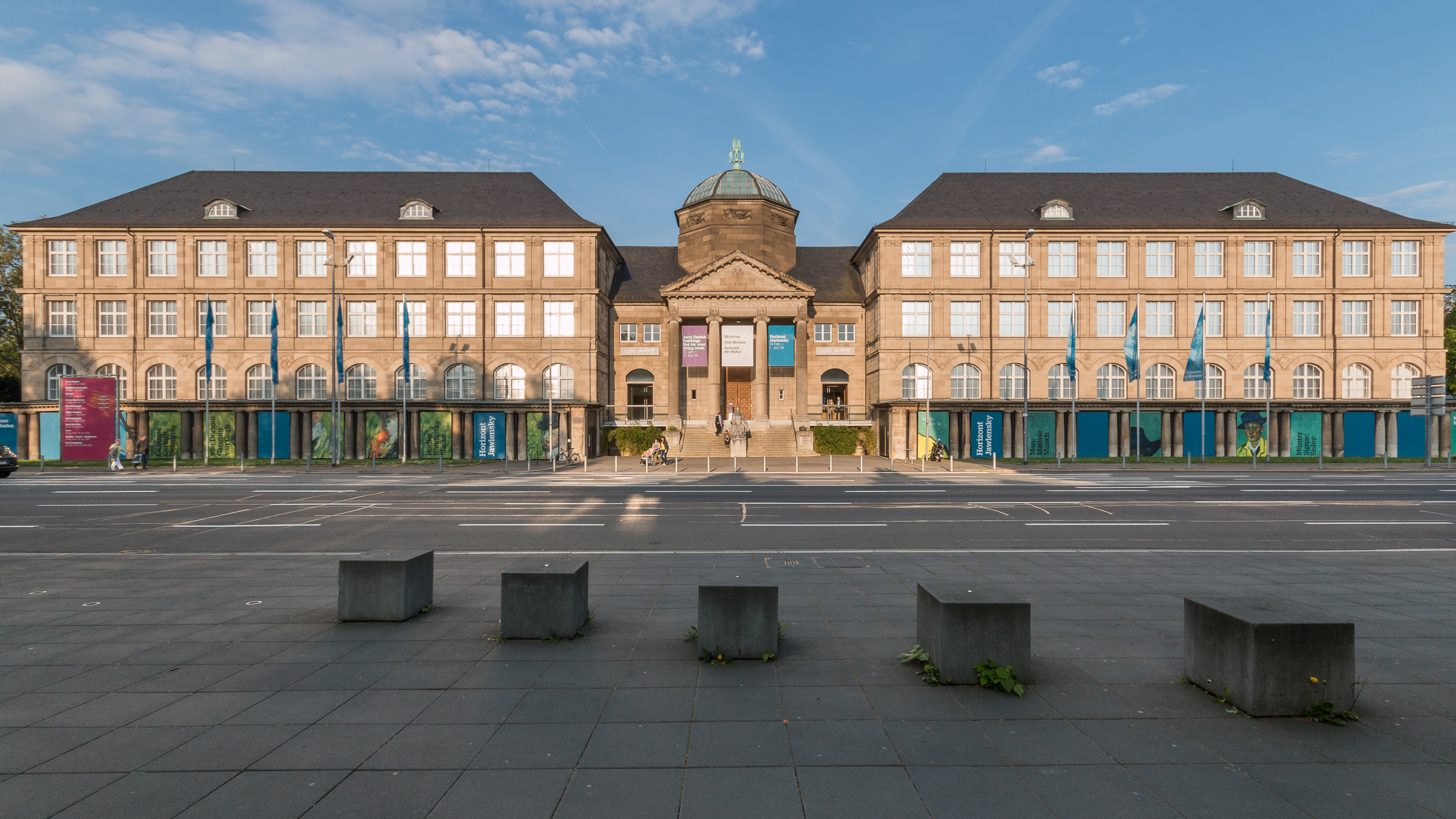
Museum Wiesbaden

After it became clear that the Marburg State Archives did not have the necessary capacity to store the shipments that were still expected, and that the separation of objects at various locations in Hesse (at the Collecting Points in Marburg and Wiesbaden, the Offenbach Archival Depot, and the Bad Wildungen depot) did not seem advisable for security and personnel reasons, the MFA&A officers responsible for Hesse decided to merge the art collecting points in Wiesbaden. Beginning in the spring of 1946, objects from Marburg were transferred to the Museum Wiesbaden, where the U.S. military government had established another Art Collecting Point under the art protection officer Walter Farmer and which offered a larger storage capacity.

At the same time, those objects that the American troops had illegally evacuated from the British occupation zone were moved to Düsseldorf and Dyck castle (this mainly concerned the objects from the Siegen ore mine). As a final measure, the four sarcophagi from the Bernterode depot were transferred to the St. Elizabeth's Church in Marburg in the secret "Operation Bodysnatch," while the military standards went to America as political booty.

Immediately after this operation, Francis Bilodeau, who had followed Hancock as director in December 1945, announced the end of the Marburg Collecting Point on August 17, 1946.

== Cooperation with German institutions ==
The MFA&A was chronically understaffed. Only Walker Hancock, assisted at times by New York conservator Sheldon Keck, and his successor Francis Bilodeau operated in Marburg. Hancock was thus dependent on local support, which is why he drew on personnel from the State Archives, the university, the State Monuments Office, and the Building Department. Even though the collaborations lasted only about 15 months, the cooperation that Hancock reported allowed the Marburg Central Collecting Point to become a methodological model for the collecting centers subsequently established in Munich Central Collecting Point and Wiesbaden. Representatives of the other art repositories, such as Walter Farmer (head of the Wiesbaden Collecting Point) and Gustav André (working at the British Zonal Fine Arts Repository), traveled to the university town in central Hesse to see the procedures at the Collecting Point and to exchange ideas about the joint work.

== In popular culture ==
In the 2014 German-American feature film The Monuments Men, the prequel that led to the founding of the Marburg Art Collecting Point is the subject of discussion. After the visit to the Siegen mine, however, the film abruptly switches to the events in Bavaria that led to the establishment of the Munich Collecting Point.

== Bibliography ==
- Rasch, Marco (2021). Das Marburger Staatsarchiv als Central Collecting Point. Mit Beiträgen von Tanja Bernsau, Susanne Dörler, Sonja Feßel, Iris Lauterbach und Katrin Marx-Jaskulski. Begleitband zur gleichnamigen Ausstellung im Hessischen Staatsarchiv, Marburg, Schriften des Hessischen Staatsarchivs 39. ISBN 978-3-88964-224-0
- Hancock, Walker (1946). Experiences of a Monuments Officer in Germany. In: College Art Journal 5:4, May 1946, pp. 271–311. doi:10.2307/773217
- Hancock, Walker (1997). A Sculptor's Fortunes. Memoir by Walker Hancock with Edward Connery Latham. Gloucester (Mass), Cape Ann Historical Association.
- Walter I. Farmer (2000): The Safekeepers. A Memoir of the Arts of the End of World War II, Berlin/New York, De Gruyter, ISBN 978-3110168976
- Nicholas, Lynn H. (May 1995) [1994]. The Rape of Europa: The Fate of Europe's Treasures in the Third Reich and the Second World War. New York City: Vintage Books. ISBN 978-0-679-40069-1. OCLC 32531154.
- Howe, Thomas Carr (1946): Salt Mines and Castles. The Discovery and Restitution of Looted European Art. Indianapolis, The Bobbs-Merrill Company
