= Soldiers' Memorial =

Memorial and military museum in St. Louis, MO, US

Soldiers Memorial Military Museum

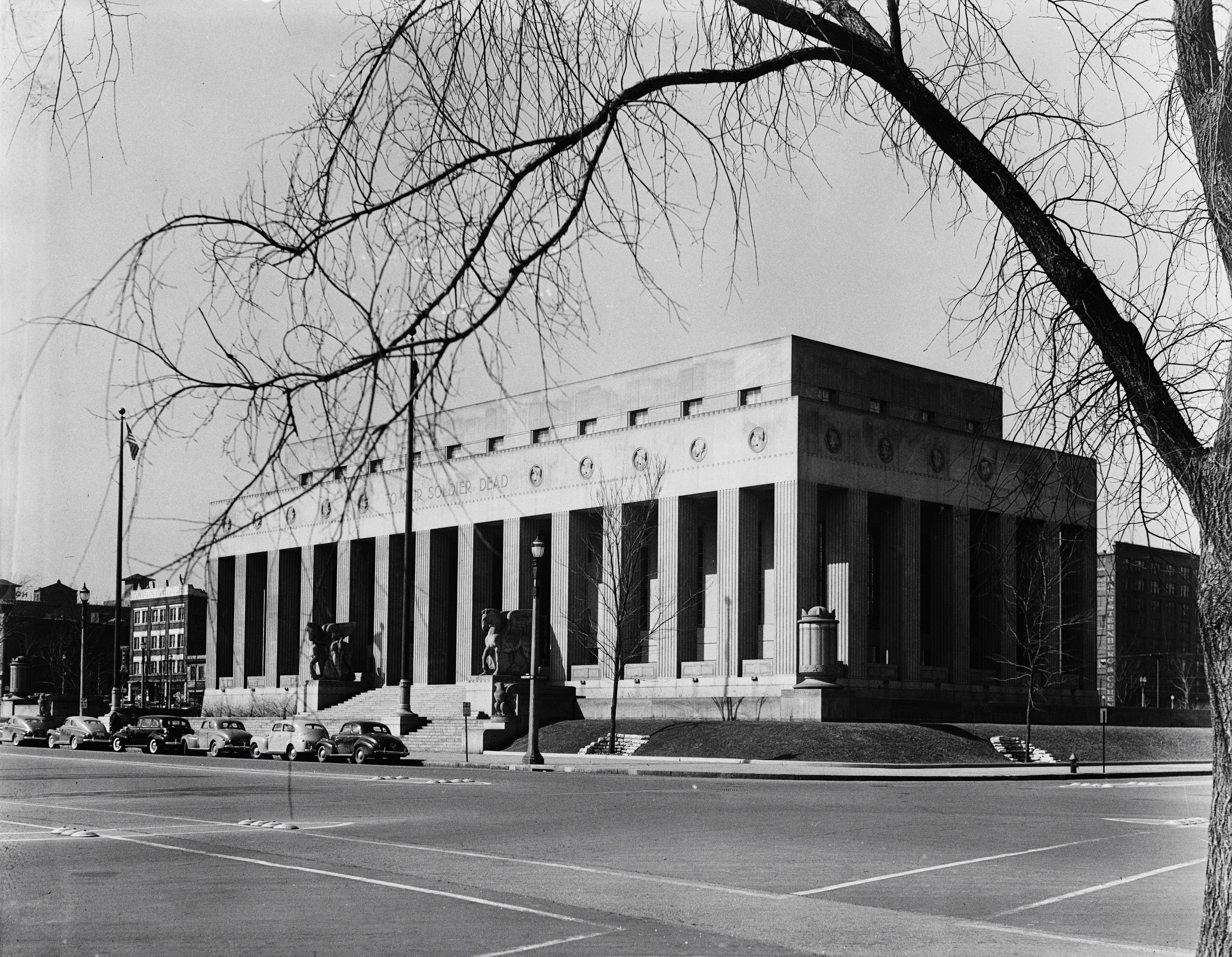
- Soldiers' Memorial in St. Louis
- Location: St. Louis, Missouri
- Coordinates: 38.6290°N 90.2000°W
- Type: Military
- Public transit access: MetroBus; MCT; Red Blue; At Civic Center
- Website: stlouis-mo.gov

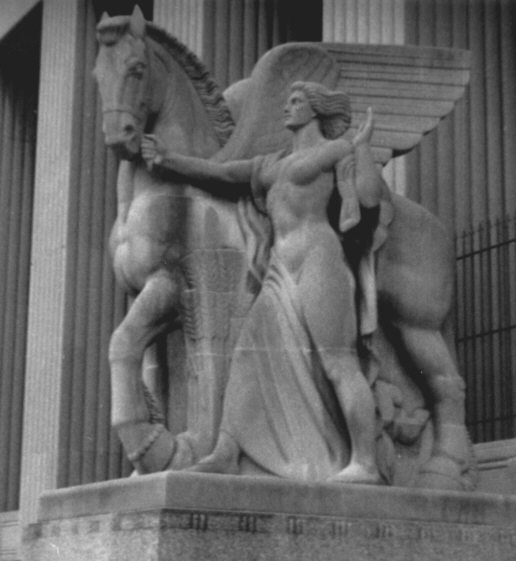
Vision, one of several figures associated with Soldiers' Memorial

The Soldiers Memorial Military Museum in downtown St. Louis, Missouri is a memorial and military museum, at 1315 Chestnut Street, owned by the City of St. Louis and operated by the Missouri Historical Society. Interior east and west wings contain display cases with military displays and memorabilia from World War I and subsequent American wars. The open-air central breezeway contains a massive black marble cenotaph upon which are engraved the names of all of St. Louis' war dead from the first world war.

The building was designed by St. Louis architectural firm Mauran, Russell & Crowell in a stripped Classical style, with a severely simplified form and limited ornament. It was dedicated by Franklin Delano Roosevelt in 1936 and officially opened to the public on Memorial Day, 1938.

Four monumental sculptural groups representing figures of Loyalty, Vision, Courage and Sacrifice by sculptor Walker Hancock stand, with their horses, on the north and south sides of the building. Other architectural sculpture here was completed by Hillis Arnold.
