= Statue of James Madison =

Statue by Walker Hancock in Washington, D.C., USA

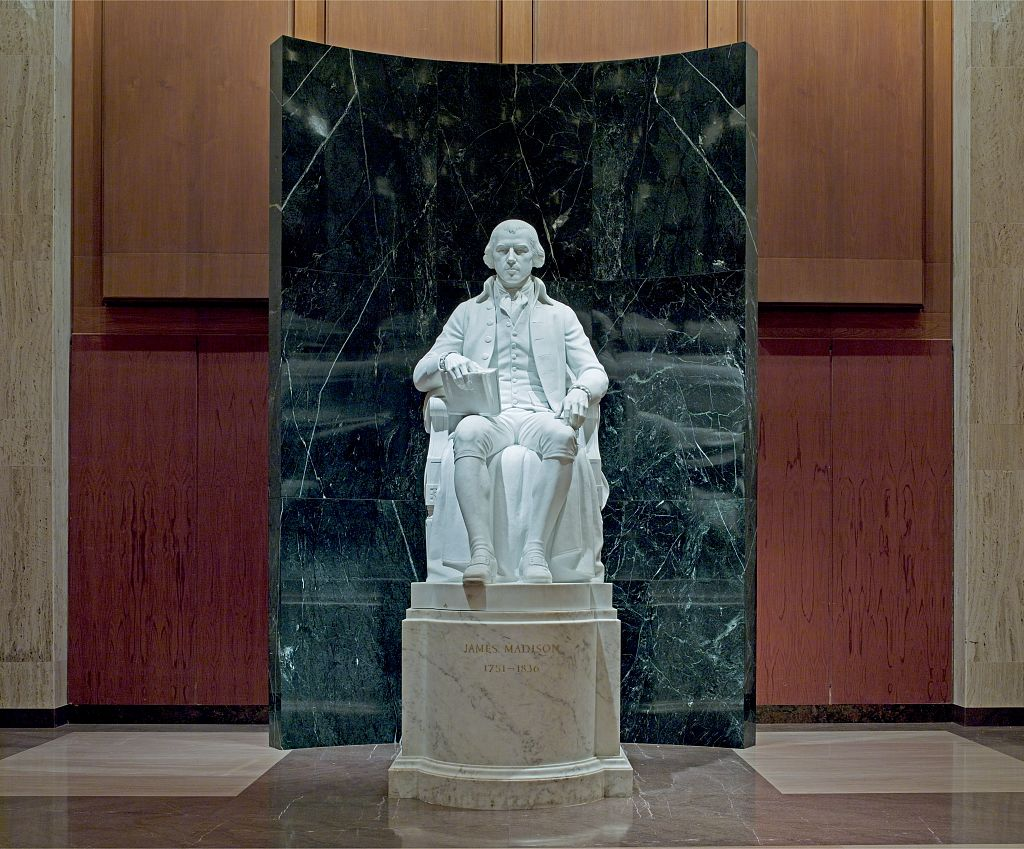
- The statue in 2007
- Artist: Walker Hancock
- Year: 1976
- Medium: Marble sculpture
- Subject: James Madison

A 1976 marble sculpture of James Madison by Walker Hancock is installed in the James Madison Memorial Building, in Washington, D.C., United States.

== See also ==
- 1976 in art
- List of memorials to James Madison
- List of sculptures of presidents of the United States
