= List of Monuments, Fine Arts, and Archives personnel =

This is a list of personnel who participated in the Monuments, Fine Arts, and Archives program under the Civil Affairs and Military Government Sections of the Allied armies between 1943 and 1946. "Expertise" attempts to indicate each person's background and suitability for MFAA at the time of their recruitment; many achieved even greater things in their later lives.

Monuments Men (except where stated, information has come from)
| Name | Rank | Expertise | Nationality | Notes |
|---|---|---|---|---|
| Adams, Edward E | Captain | Interior architect | US | Signatory of the Wiesbaden Manifesto |
| Albright, Frank P | Lieutenant | Archaeologist | US | |
| Amand, Marcel | Lieutenant | Archaeologist | Belgium | |
| Ammons, Jack | Pfc. | | US | Present at Markers salt mine. |
| Anderson, Harry A. | Major | | US | |
| Apgar, Horace | T/Sgt. | | US | Assigned to MFAA in late 1945; worked as an investigator, involved in the retrieval and restitution of Jewish property |
| Appel, William B | S/Sgt. | | US | |
| Archey, Gilbert | Lt. Col. | | New Zealand | |
| Armstrong, Robert G. | S/Sgt. | | US | |
| Arnold, John G | | | US | |
| Avery, Myrtilla | | Medieval art, art history professor emeritus at Wellesley College | US | Volunteer assistant with the American Council of Learned Societies. |
| Baillie Reynolds, Paul Kenneth | Major | Classics scholar and archaeologist | UK | |
| Balfour, Ronald Edmond | Major | Historian and Fellow at King's College, Cambridge | UK | Reported the theft of Michelangelo's Madonna of Bruges. Killed at Kleve 10 March 1945. |
| Barancik, Richard M. | Pfc. | | US | Post-war in 1946, Barancik studied architecture at the University of Cambridge and at the Ecole des Beaux-Arts at Fontainebleau in 1947. After returning from Europe, he finished his degree in Architecture from the University of Illinois. He died on July 14, 2023 at the age of 98, and was reportedly the last surviving member of the MFAA. |
| Baudouin, Frans | | | Belgium | |
| Beaufort, René | | | US | |
| Bell, Harry E. | Major | | US | |
| Bencowitz, Isaac | Captain | Chemist, linguist (native Russian speaker) | US | Joined MFAA April 1946 |
| Bernholz, Charles | | Driver and photographer | US | Joined MFAA in Italy in January 1945 |
| Bilodeau, Francis W. | Pfc. | | US | |
| Bleecker, Paul O. | Pfc. | | US | |
| Boardman, Edward T. | Lieutenant | | US | |
| Boell, Jesse E. | | Assistant Director of the War Records Office, U.S. National Archives | US | |
| Bonilla y Norat, Felix Josè | Lieutenant | Painter, art professor University of Puerto Rico, art critic San Juan Star | Puerto Rico | |
| Bonzom, Eugene | | | Belgium | |
| Boon, Karel Gerald | | | Netherlands | |
| Born, Lester K. | Major | | US | |
| Borouch, Edward J. | T/4 | | US | |
| Bovio, Flora | | | US | |
| Bowie, Mrs. Barbara H. | | | UK | |
| Bradford, John S.P. | Captain | | UK | |
| Breitenbach, Edgar | | Art historian; native German speaker | US | |
| Broerman, Paul | | | Belgium | |
| Brooke, Humphrey | | | UK | |
| Bryant, William C. | Captain | | US | |
| Brye, Hubert de | | | France | |
| Buchman, Julius H. | Captain | | US | |
| Buckingham, Russell H. | Pfc. | | US | |
| Bumbar, Julianna | Lieutenant | | US | Lt. Bumbar accompanied the Veit Stoss altarpiece and da Vinci's Lady with an Ermine back to Poland in 1946. |
| Burks, Bernard D. | Captain | | US | |
| Busey, C. | Captain | | US | |
| Callon, Margaret | | | Spain | |
| Carr, Allan | | | UK | |
| Casson, Stanley | Lt. Col. | | UK | |
| Chadwick, Gordon | Corporal | Architect | US | |
| Chance, R. | Captain | | UK | |
| Charles, Rollo | Captain | Art academic at Ashmolean Museum at Oxford | UK | |
| Cheguillaume, M. J. | | | France | |
| Chevigny, Prince | | | Austria | |
| Child, Sargent Burrage | | | US | |
| Christopher, William R. | | | Austria | |
| Clarke, Roger A. | Lieutenant | | US | |
| Clem, Harold J. | | | US | |
| Conrad, Doda | Lieutenant | Musician | US | Assigned to MFAA mid-1945 |
| Cook, J. M. | Major | | UK | |
| Cook, James O. | S/Sgt. | | US | |
| Cooper, Douglas | Squadron Leader | Art collector and critic; fluent German speaker; interrogator | UK | Noted for his discovery of the Schenker Papers and his investigation into Swiss complicity in the trading of looted artworks |
| Coremans, Paul B. | | Chemist and archivist | Belgium | |
| Corrigan, Gordon F. | Sergeant | | US | |
| Cott, Perry Blythe | Lt. Cdr. | Curator of European and Asiatic art at the Worcester Art Museum in Massachusetts | US | |
| Coulter, J. Hamilton | Lt. Cdr. | | US | |
| Croft-Murray, Edward | Major | Researcher | UK | Served with MFAA in Italy and Austria from 1943 |
| Davie, L.G. | Sgt | Art historian and teacher | UK | Served with MFAA in Greece and Italy. Taught in London and Rye, Sussex |
| Davis, Clyde I | Corporal | | US | |
| Davis, Richard S. | Lieutenant | Director of the museum and library at Cranbrook Academy of Art | US | |
| Dawson, Eric A. | Captain | | UK | |
| de Beer, Esmond Samuel | | | UK | |
| De Vinna, Maurice A., Jr. | | | US | |
| Defino, L. | S/Sgt. | | US | |
| Delsaux | | | Austria | |
| DeWald, Ernest T. | Lt. Col. | Professor of Art at Princeton University | US | Joined MFAA in Italy in 1943 |
| Dewitt, Roscoe P. | Major | Architect | US | |
| Dierkauf | | | Austria | |
| Dignam, Celia | | | Austria | |
| Diraimondo, Charles J. | T/4 | | US | |
| Dixon-Spain, J.E. | Squadron Leader | | UK | |
| Dlugosz, Louis F. | T/4 | | US | |
| Doane, Gilbert Harry | | Director of Libraries and Director of Library School at University of Wisconsin - Madison | US | |
| Dollfus | | | France | |
| Doman, Andrea | | | US | |
| Donn, D.L. | | | UK | |
| Doubinsky, Elie J. B. | | | France | |
| Downey, Glanville | Lieutenant | | US | |
| Dreyfus, Carle | | | France | |
| Druene | | | France | |
| Duchartre, P. L. | | | France | |
| Dunbabin, T. J. | Lieutenant Colonel | | UK | |
| Eden, Peter | | | UK | |
| Ellis, R. H. | Captain | | UK | |
| Enthoven, Roedrick E. | Captain | | UK | |
| Ermatinger, Charles J. | T/4 | Clerk | US | |
| Estreicher, Karol | Major | Art historian | Poland | |
| Ettlinger, Harry L. | T/4 Sgt. | Native German speaker | US | |
| Faison, S. Lane, Jr. | Lt. Cdr. | Professor and department head at Williams College | US | |
| Farmer, Walter I. | Captain | Architect; interior designer | US | Signatory of the Wiesbaden Manifesto; MFAA's first director |
| Fleetwood-Hesketh, P. | | | UK | |
| Fleischner, Charles | Lt. Cdr. | Art historian | US | Joined MFAA in 1946 |
| Florisoone, Michel | | | France | |
| Ford, Dale V. | Lieutenant | | US | |
| France, Leys A. | Captain | | US | |
| Francois, Michel | | | France | |
| French, T. W. | Major | | UK | |
| Fujishiro, Motoko | | | US | |
| Fuller, A. | Captain | | US | |
| Gabriel, Richard F. | Pfc. | | US | |
| Gallagher, Charles F. | | | US | |
| Gangnat, Philippe | | | France | |
| Gardner, Paul | Lt. Col. | Architect; Director of the William Rockhill Nelson Gallery of Art and Mary Atkins Museum of Fine Arts | US | Commanded the MFAA in Italy |
| Gear, William | Major | Art historian and artist | UK | Joined MFAA in mid 1945 and supervised the return of artworks from the Berlin Art Collections |
| Giuli, Thomas | Captain | | US | |
| Glass, Robert | | | Austria | |
| Goldberg, S. L. | T/5 | | US | |
| Goodison, John W. | | | UK | |
| Gould, Cecil | Captain | | UK | |
| Granger-Taylor, Jerry | | | UK | |
| Graswinckel, Dirk Petrus Marius | Major | | Netherlands | Went on to become National Archivist of the Netherlands 1946-1953 and at the request of UNESCO organised and convened the first meeting of the International Council on Archives in 1948. |
| Grier, Harry D. M. | Captain | Architect; director of the Frick Collection | US | Joined MFAA mid 1945 |
| Grinbarg, Morrie S. | Lieutenant | | US | |
| Hald, William | Pfc. | | US | |
| Hall, Ardelia R. | | | US | Joined MFAA in 1945 |
| Halsall | Captain | | US | |
| Hammett, Ralph W. | Captain | Professor of architecture at the University of Michigan 1931-1965 | US | 1943-1945, England and France, Senior MFA&A Officer at G-5 SHAEF [{www.monumentman.org}] |
| Hammon, Stratton | Lt. Col. | architect | US | |
| Hammond, Mason | Lt. Col. | Classics professor at Harvard University; expert in Italian culture; Italian speaker | US | |
| Hammond, N. C. L. | Lt. Col. | | US | |
| Hancock, Walker K. | Captain | Head of the sculpture department at the Pennsylvania Academy of the Fine Arts | US | |
| Hansen, Robert W. | T/4 | Professor Emeritus of Art at Occidental College | US | |
| Harboard, Felix | | | UK | |
| Harris, Clyde K. | Lieutenant | Painter and arts graduate | US | |
| Hartigan, John D. | Major | | US | |
| Hartt, Frederick | Lieutenant | Scholar of Italian art | US | Joined MFAA in Italy in 1944 |
| Harvey, John | | | US | |
| Hathaway, Calvin S. | Captain | Associate curator at the Cooper Union Museum for the Arts of Decoration in New York. | US | |
| Hauschildt, Kurt F. | Lieutenant | | US | |
| Haynes, Denys E. L. | | | UK | |
| Hayward, John F. | | | UK | |
| Heinrich, Theodore A. | Lieutenant | Art curator, administrator and collector | US | Joined MFAA mid 1945 |
| Henderson, Harold G. | Lt. Col. | President of the Japan Society in New York | UK | |
| Henraux, A. S. | | | UK | |
| Henry, Alfred | T/5 | | US | |
| Hensley, Richard G. | Major | | US | |
| Higgins, Stephen | | | France | |
| Hocart, Raymond | Lt. Col. | Professor and crystallographer at the University of Strasbourg | France | Served with the French equivalent of the MFAA, the Commission de Récupération Artistique, in 1945 |
| Holland, Eleanor S. | | | US | |
| Hollis, Howard C. | | | US | |
| Horn, Walter W. | Lieutenant | Professor at the University of California at Berkeley; native German speaker | US | Directed the discovery of the crown jewels of the Holy Roman Empire in a walled up passage of the bunkers under Nuremberg |
| Horne, J. Anthony | Lt. Col. | Director of the Dallas Museum of Fine Arts | US | Joined MFAA in 1946 as its Deputy Chief |
| Howard, Richard Foster | Lt. Col. | Director of the Dallas Museum of Fine Arts | US | In July 1946, joined MFAA Office of Military Government for Germany (OMGUS) as Deputy Chief. A few months later, he succeeded Maj. Bancel LaFarge as Chief. |
| Howe, Thomas Carr Jr. | Lt. Cmdr. | Director of the California Palace of the Legion of Honor, San Francisco | US | |
| Huberman, Harry | Sergeant | | US | |
| Huchthausen, Walter J. | Captain | Director of the Department of Design at the Boston Museum School of Fine Art; member of the faculty at the University of Minnesota | US | Killed by gunfire April 1945, while working to salvage an altarpiece in Germany |
| Hugoboom | Lieutenant | | US | |
| Hutchinson, Lucy | | | Austria | |
| Hyslop, G. | Captain | | UK | |
| Jacka, Pauline | | | Austria | |
| Jaffe, Hans C. L. | | | Netherlands | |
| Jaujard, Jacques | | | France | |
| Jefferson | Colonel | | US | |
| Jenkinson, Hilary | | Archivist at the Public Record Office | UK | |
| Jennings, R. J. | Pfc. | | Austria | |
| Johnson, Lorin K. | Sergeant | | US | |
| Kates, George N. | | | US | |
| Kavli, Guthorm | Captain | | Norway | |
| Keck, Sheldon W. | Lieutenant | Art conservator | US | |
| Keezer, Marcellus B. | | | US | |
| Kelleher, Patrick J. | Captain | | US | |
| Keller, Deane | Captain | Professor at the Yale School of Fine Arts | US | |
| Kern, Daniel J. | Lieutenant | | US | |
| Keyes, James H. | | | Austria | |
| King, Donald Beeson | Flt. Lt. (subsequently Sqn. Ldr.) | Intelligence officer, linguist | UK | Subsequently Keeper of Textiles, Victoria and Albert Museum, London; President, Centre International d'Etudes des Textiles Anciens |
| Kinzie, Joseph R. | Capt | | US | |
| Kirstein, Lincoln E. | Pfc. | Founder of the New York City Ballet; driver, writer and translator | US | |
| Koberstein, Freeman G. | T/4 | | US | |
| Koch, Albert C. | Lieutenant | Architect, widely traveled, did engineering work with Edward D. Stone | US | Went on to develop Techbuilt and Techcrete prefabricated structures. |
| Koch, Robert A. | Lieutenant | Professor of fine arts and archeology at Princeton University | US | |
| Kormendi, Andre | S/Sgt. | | US | |
| Kovalyak, Stephen | Lieutenant | | US | |
| Kuhlke, Richard H. | Lieutenant | | US | Joined MFAA mid 1945; honored by Poland for his work with the MFAA |
| Kuhn, Charles L. | Lt. Cdr. | Director of the Busch-Reisinger Museum; professor at Harvard University | US | |
| La Boulaye, Paul de | | | France | |
| Lacey, George T. | Captain | | US | |
| LaFarge, L. Bancel | Major | Architect | US | Received honors from the United States, France, Belgium, Czechoslovakia, and the Netherlands for his service with MFAA |
| Langui, Emile | | A curator at the Ghent Museum of Fine Arts; Secretary to the Minister of Public Works | Belgium | |
| Lardner, W. C. | Cpl. | | US | |
| Larwood, James B. | Captain | | US | |
| Lazarev, Professor Viktor | | | Soviet Union | |
| Lee, Sherman E. | Lieutenant | Curator of Far Eastern Art at the Detroit Institute of Arts | US | Served with MFAA in Japan; received the Order of the Sacred Treasure and the Legion of Honor |
| Lehmann-Haupt, Hellmut | | Curator of rare books at Columbia University; assistant professor of book arts at Columbia's School of Library Service; visiting lecturer at Smith College and at the University of Illinois; native German speaker | US | Joined MFAA in 1946 |
| Lemaire, Raymond | | | Belgium | |
| Leonard, Stewart | | Bomb-disposal expert; director of the Zanesville Art Institute in Ohio | US | Head of MFAA in Bavaria in 1947; strongly disputed the return of certain artworks to Italy and consequently resigned from MFAA in 1948 |
| Lesley, Everett Parker Jr. | Captain | Scholar and expert on the decorative arts; professor at the University of Minnesota | US | Co-author and signatory of the Wiesbaden Manifesto |
| Lewis | | | Austria | |
| Lindsay, Kenneth C. | Sergeant | Art history professor at Binghamton University | US | |
| Lovegrove, William A. | Lieutenant | Sculptor and diplomat | US | Signatory of the Wiesbaden Manifesto; subsequently worked with the French Commission de Récuperation and received the French Legion of Honor |
| Lucia, A. P. | Sergeant | | US | |
| Maehler, Wolfgang | Pvt. | | US | |
| Markham, S. F. | Major | | UK | |
| Markus, Werner | Pvt. | | US | |
| Marriott, Basil | Captain | | US | |
| Marteau | | | Belgium | |
| Mast, Gerald | | | US | |
| Maxse, Fred, H.J. | Captain | | UK | |
| McCain, William D. | Captain | | US | |
| McDonnell, A. J. L. | Lt. Col. | | UK | |
| McDowall, E. | | | UK | |
| McGinn, Elizabeth A. | T/5 | | US | |
| Meekings, Cecil A.F. | Major | | UK | |
| Merola | | | Austria | |
| Merrill, Keith | Cdr. | Administrator | US | Recruited to MFAA in 1945 as deputy to Lieutenant Lamont Moore to assist with the shipment of 202 German-owned paintings to Washington for safekeeping. This project was the object of protests in the Wiesbaden Manifesto |
| Merrill, Richard P. | Pfc. | | US | |
| Methuen, Lord Anthony | Major | Architect | UK | |
| Miller, Robert M. | T/3 | | US | |
| Minet, Marcelle | | | France | |
| Mitchell, Charles | Captain | | Austria | |
| Monroe, Robert | | | US | |
| Moore, Lamont | Lieutenant | Curator of the education department of the National Gallery of Art in Washington, D.C. | US | |
| Morey, Jonathan T. | Captain | | US | |
| Munby, A. N. L. | | | US | |
| Munich | | | Austria | |
| Munsing, Stefan P. | | Interior designer | US | |
| Murray-Baillie, Hughe | Captain | | UK | |
| Mutrux, E. J. | Captain | | US | |
| Myers, Denys P. | T/5 | Architectural historian | US | |
| Newton, Henry C. | Colonel | | US | |
| Newton, Norman | Lt. Col. | Landscape architecture professor at Harvard University | US | Director of the sub-commission for the MFAA in Italy, from 1942 until 1946. In Italy, he was made Commander of the Order of Saints Maurice and Lazarus, Grand Officer of the Crown of Italy and received the Star of Italian Solidarity |
| Nicholls, John F. | Captain | | UK | |
| Norins, Leslie H. | Captain | | US | |
| Norris, E. Christopher | Squadron Leader | | UK | |
| Ossorio, Frederic E. | Second Lieutenant | | US | Joined MFAA in 1946 as a civilian with a military rank |
| Parkhurst, Charles P. | Lieutenant | National Gallery of Art | US | Signatory of the Wiesbaden Manifesto; made Chevalier of the Legion of Honor |
| Pascale, D. | Cpl. | | US | |
| Peck, Edward S. | | | US | |
| Peebles, Bernard M. | S/Sgt. | Professor emeritus at the Catholic University in Washington, D.C. | US | |
| Pennoyer, Albert Sheldon | Captain | Painter | US | |
| Perry, Lionel | Major | | UK | |
| Phillips, Ewan | Captain | | US | |
| Phillips, John Marshall | Cpl. | Director of the Yale Art Gallery; silver expert | US | Identified Hermann Göring's prized Vermeer painting as a fake by Han van Meegeren |
| Pilliod, Henri E. | | | US | |
| Pinsent, Cecil R. | Capt | | UK | |
| Plaut, James Sachs | Lt. Cdr. | Director of the Institute of Modern Art (later Contemporary Art) in Boston | US | Director of the Art Looting Investigation Unit |
| Pleasants, Frederick R. | | | US | |
| Plumer, James Marshall | | | US | |
| Pomrenze, Seymour J. | Col. | Archivist | US | |
| Popham, Anne | | | UK | Joined MFAA in 1945 |
| Popham, Walter D. | Captain | | US | |
| Posey, Robert K. | Captain | Architect | US | Posey discovered Nazi artworks repository in the salt mine at Altaussee. For his remarkable work with MFAA, he was awarded the Legion of Honor and the Order of Leopold |
| Poste, Leslie I. | Lieutenant | Library and archives specialist | US | |
| Potts, Georgiana | | | Austria | |
| Preston, Stuart | T/Sgt. | | US | |
| Prinet, Jean | | | France | |
| Prochaska, Ladislav L. | Pvt. | | US | |
| Propst, Kenneth H. | Captain | Fine arts graduate | US | During WWII, Propst accepted an assignment as the first Monuments Man in charge of the MFAA Branch of the Office of Military Government for Bavaria, Regierungsbezirk Oberfranken and Mittelfranken. Propst conducted inspections of churches, castles, and repositories in the area surrounding Ansbach and Nuremberg, including Schloss Plassenburg. |
| Putrux, Edward J. | Captain | | US | |
| Puyvelde, Leo van | | | Belgium | |
| Quessenberry, Mary Regan | Major | Fine arts graduate | US | |
| Rae, Edwin C. | Captain | Scholar of medieval Irish sculpture and architecture | US | |
| Ratensky, Samuel | Lieutenant | Architect | US | Signatory of the Wiesbaden Manifesto |
| Reeds, James A. | Sergeant | Medical student at the University of Iowa; German speaker | US | |
| Reeds, John N. | T/5 | Chairman of the chemical engineering department at California State University in Long Beach | US | |
| Risom, Ole C. | Pvt. | | US | |
| Ritchie, Andrew Carnduff | | Director of the Albright–Knox Art Gallery in Buffalo, New York | US | |
| Rivoir, James J. | First Sgt | | US | |
| Robertson, Giles Henry | Major | | UK | |
| Röell, David C. | | Art Advisor to Queen Wilhelmina of the Netherlands and Director of the Rijksmuseum in Amsterdam. | Netherlands | |
| Rogin, Martin | Lieutenant | | US | |
| Rorimer, James J. | Captain | Curator of the Cloisters, Metropolitan Museum of Art in New York | US | |
| Ross, Marvin C. | Captain | Expert on Byzantine, Russian and 18th century French art; curator of Medieval and Decorative Arts at the Walters Art Gallery in Baltimore, Maryland | US | |
| Ross, Malcolm | Major | | UK | |
| Ross, Michael | | | UK | |
| Rousseau, Theodore, Jr. | | Art expert; French speaker | US | Served with ALIU; subsequently became curator of paintings at the Metropolitan Museum of Art in New York |
| Rouvier, Jean | | | France | |
| Sage, R. W. | Lieutenant | | US | |
| Sakin, Eugene | | | Austria | |
| Sami, Rouben | Cpl | | US | Deputy director of Offenbach Archival Depot, once the centralized collection point for the return of books and manuscripts taken by the Nazis |
| Sampson, Selena | T/5 | | US | |
| Sanchez, Manuel | | | US | |
| Sattgast, Charles R. | Capt | | US | |
| Sawyer, Charles H. | Pfc. | Director of the Worcester Art Museum in Massachusetts | US | |
| Scarff, John Henry | | | US | |
| Scarpitta, Salvatore C., Jr. | Seaman, 2nd Class | Sculptor; Italian speaker | US | Joined Italian section of MFAA after escaping from internment in Italy |
| Schmidt, Gerlot W. | S/Sgt. | | US | |
| Schoonbrood, Jack | | | Poland | |
| Selke, George A. | Major | | US | Joined MFAA in November 1945 as Acting Chief of the Education and Religion Office for Land Salzburg. In this position, he worked alongside Monuments Men Capt. Charles R. Sattgast and Lt. Col. Ernest T. DeWald to facilitate the recovery and return of works of art and other cultural objects looted by the Nazis and stored within the jurisdiction of the United States Forces, Austria (USFA). Participated in the movement of the Hertziana Library Collection from the Hallein salt mines, the transfer of Polish works of art and books from Schloss Fichhorn to the Wiesbaden Central Collecting Point, and the removal of a collection of Tibetan artifacts from Schloss Mittersill. Subsequently, Chancellor of the University of Montana. |
| Shepherd, Dorothy G. | | | US | |
| Shipman, Fred W. | | | US | |
| Shrady, Frederick C. | Lieutenant | Sculptor known for his religious works; French speaker | US | |
| Sickman, Laurence | Major | Curator of Oriental art, Nelson-Atkins Museum of Art in Kansas City | US | |
| Sizer, Theodore | Major | Director of the Yale University Art Gallery | US | Joined MFAA in North Africa, Sicily, Italy and Britain; made Commander of the Order of the Crown of Italy |
| Skelton, Dorothy G.S. | | Artist and educator | US | |
| Skelton, R. A. | | | UK | |
| Skilton, John D., Jr. | Lieutenant | Curator at the National Gallery of Art in Washington, D.C. | US | Received the German Merit Cross 1st Class (Verdienstkreuz 1. Klasse) |
| Smyth, Craig Hugh | Lieutenant | Researcher at the National Gallery of Art in Washington | US | Concurred with the Wiesbaden Manifesto (but not a signatory). Received the U.S. Army Commendation Medal, Chevalier of the Legion of Honor and the Netherlands Medal for Service to the States |
| Sponenburgh, Mark R. | Captain | Sculptor, historian, and educator | US | |
| Stach, Jochem | | | Netherlands | |
| Standen, Edith A. | Captain | Secretary to the Widener Collection at Elkins Park, Pennsylvania | US | Canadian born, took US citizenship in 1942 |
| Steer, Kenneth, CBE | Captain | Assistant Archaeologist with the Royal Commission on the Ancient and Historical Monuments of Scotland | UK | Joined MFAA in June 1945 |
| Steiner, Walter | Lieutenant | | US | |
| Stopek, Harry | T/5 | | US | |
| Stout, George L. | Lt. Cdr. | Head of the conservation department at Harvard University's Fogg Art Museum | US | Worked in northern Europe for MFAA until July 1945; posted to Japan in October 1945 |
| Stroell, Miss Barbara | | | Austria | |
| Taper, Bernard | Lieutenant | Investigative Journalist | US | |
| Taylor | Captain | | US | |
| Taylor, Mrs. Katharine W. W. | | | US | |
| Thornton, Asa M. | Captain | | US | |
| Tierney, Patrick Lennox | | Specialist in Asian art history and Japanese art; Japanese speaker | US | A close collaborator with MFAA in Japan although never a member; recipient of the Order of the Rising Sun |
| Tregor, Nison A. | Captain | | US | |
| Tucker, Eve | | | US | |
| Valland, Rose | Captain | Employee of the Galerie nationale du Jeu de Paume in Paris | France | Regarded as a hero by many, Valland secretly documented during the German occupation, at personal risk, transfers of French artworks to Germany. Her records assisted the return of many items to their legitimate owners. Subsequently a member of the French Commission de Récupération Artistique (Commission on Art Recovery). She received the Legion of Honor, the Medal of the Résistance, and was made Commander of the Order of Arts and Letters, Presidential Medal of Freedom, Officer's Cross of the Order of Merit of the Federal Republic of Germany. Subsequently appointed "curator". |
| Van Der Haut, Hendrik | | | Netherlands | |
| Van Nisse, Verschoor | | | Netherlands | |
| Van Nortwick, William B. | Captain | | US | |
| Vanderbilt, Paul | | | US | |
| Vanuxem, Jacques | | | France | |
| Villeret, Bulla de | Major | | France | |
| Vlug, Jan | | | Netherlands | |
| Vorenkamp, Alphonse | Lt. Col. | Professor of art at Smith College in Northampton, Massachusetts | Netherlands | Received the Order of the Dutch Lion |
| Vrecko, Frant | | | Austria | |
| Vries, Dr. A. B. de | | | Netherlands | |
| Vroom, Dr. N. R. A. | | | Netherlands | |
| Wagstaff, G. F. T. | Captain | | UK | |
| Walker, William | Cpl. | | US | |
| Walsh | | | Austria | |
| Ward-Perkins, John Bryan | Lt. Col. | Chair of archaeology at the Royal University of Malta | UK | Worked to protect ancient Roman sites of Lepcis Magna and Sabratha in Libya. Subsequently, worked for MFAA in north Africa and Italy. Post-war, he was named Director of the Allied sub-commission for Monuments and Fine Arts in Italy |
| Warner, Langdon | | archaeologist | US | |
| Waterhouse, Ellis K. | Major | Art historian | UK | Joined MFAA in 1945; identified the painting "Supper at Emmaus", previously attributed to Vermeer, as a fake. |
| Watson, Hon. Mark | | | US | |
| Waugh, Sidney Blehler | Captain | Sculptor and designer | US | Worked in north Africa and Italy, often under fire; received the Silver Star, Bronze Star, Croix de Guerre (twice) and was made Knight of the Order of the Crown of Italy. Helped secure and recover art work and other valuables from the Abbey of Monte Cassino after the Battle of Monte Cassino. |
| Webb, Geoffrey F. | Lt. Col. | Architectural historian; Slade Professor of Fine Art at Cambridge University. | UK | Party to the exposure of the Van Meegeren forgeries. Awarded the bronze Medal of Freedom; the Dutch government showed their appreciation by "awarding" Webb one of Van Meegeren's forgeries: "The Procuress" |
| Westland, Althea | | | UK | |
| Whatmough, J. N. | S/Sgt. | | US | |
| Wijsenbeek, L. J. F. | | | Netherlands | |
| Wilkes, David G. | Lieutenant | | US | |
| Willard, Edward N. | Cpl. | | US | |
| Willess, Lester M. | T/5 | | US | |
| Williams, Lewis S. | Major | | US | |
| Willmot, George F. | Major | Archaeologist | UK | |
| Winkler, Dr. Erik | Captain | Art historian | Czech Republic | |
| Wittmann, Otto, Jr. | Major | Instructor of art history at Skidmore College and curator of the Hyde Collection, both in upstate New York | US | |
| Wolff, Adrienne | | | France | |
| Woolley, Sir Leonard | Lt. Col. | Archaeologist | UK | Archaeological Advisor to the Director of Civil Affairs (at Supreme Headquarters Allied Expeditionary Force), in 1943. Traveled into Sicily, Italy, and Northern Europe. Proponent of the Wiesbaden Manifesto. |
| Yoda, Takayoshi | | Architect | Japan | |
| Young, David K. | Captain | | US | |
| Yuill Ralph W. | Major | | US | |
| Zimmermann, J. E. | Lieutenant | | US | |
