= Charles Parkhurst =

Charles Parkhurst may refer to:

- Charles Henry Parkhurst (1842–1933), American clergyman and social reformer
- Charles Percy Parkhurst (1913–2008), American museum curator who recovered works stolen by Nazis
- Charley Parkhurst (1812–1879), American transgender stagecoach driver and settler
