= Myrtilla Avery =

Historian, art historian (1869–1959)

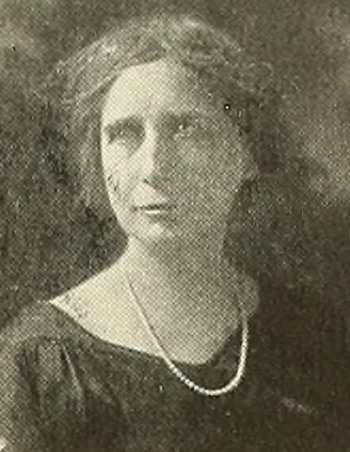
- Myrtilla Avery from the 1929 yearbook of Wellesley College
- Born: November 24, 1868; Katonah, New York, U.S.
- Died: April 4, 1959 (age 90); New York, New York, U.S.
- Occupations: College professor, art historian, medievalist, museum director

Myrtilla Avery (November 24, 1868 – April 4, 1959) was an American classical scholar focused on Medieval art, former chair of the Department of Art at Wellesley College and director of the Farnsworth Art Museum from 1930 to 1937.

== Early life and education ==
Avery was born in Katonah, New York, the daughter of Alfred Franklin Avery and Ophelia Jane Todd Avery. She graduated in 1891 from Wellesley College, majoring in Greek. She started taking classes at University at Albany, SUNY, while working in the university library. By 1895 she earned a bachelor's degree in Library Science. She earned a Master of Arts degree from Wellesley in 1913 and a doctorate in art history from Radcliffe College in 1927. Her master's thesis was titled "Frescoes of the Old and New Testament Series in the Nave of the Upper Church of S. Francis of Assisi".

== Career ==
Avery offered one of the earliest classes in museum studies at the Farnsworth Art Museum and by 1915 she introduced the first art history classes at Wellesley. She became the chair of the Wellesley art department in 1929, succeeding Alice Van Vechten Brown. After serving on Wellesley's faculty for 25 years, she retired from Wellesley in 1937 and was named professor emerita. She was director of the Farnsworth Art Museum from 1930 to 1937. Her successor, at her recommendation, was Sirarpie Der Nersessian.

In 1923, Avery sent "five packing cases, nine trunks, 11 boxes and two suitcases" of donated clothing to Greece for war refugees. In retirement she volunteered for the American Council of Learned Societies. In 1943, the council formed the Committee on the Protection of Cultural Treasures in War Areas and they worked on indexing the most important artworks in Nazi-occupied countries.

== Publications ==
Avery's work was published in scholarly journals including The Art Bulletin.

- "Traveling Pictures and Schoolroom Decoration" (1900)
- "The Alexandrian Style at Santa Maria Antiqua, Rome" (1925)
- Exultet Rolls of South Italy (1937)
- "Miniatures of the Fables of Bidpai and of the Life of Aesop in the Pierpont Morgan Library" (1941)

== Personal life ==
Avery traveled with her widowed mother, who died while they were in Greece in 1922. Avery died in 1959, in New York City, at the age of 90.

== See also ==
- Monuments, Fine Arts, and Archives
- List of Monuments, Fine Arts, and Archives (MFAA) personnel
- Women in the art history field
