= Maureen Gibbon =

American novelist and writer

Maureen Gibbon is an American novelist and writer. She also writes short fiction, nonfiction and reviews books. Her works have been published in several print and online publications. Gibbon has three novels, Paris Red, Swimming Sweet Arrow and Thief.

== Education ==
Gibbon studied at Barnard College in New York and the Iowa Writers' Workshop.

== Career ==
=== Educator ===
Gibbon has taught at Bemidji State University since 2006 in the English department. Gibbon was promoted to professor on Sept. 1, 2015.

Gibbon's courses typically are writing workshops for Bemidji State University's BFA program. Gibbon often offers electives in literature ranging from literature for young adults to travel narratives to understanding literature.

In 2012, Gibbon created and taught Literary Publishing I and II, which focused on creating and running the lit magazine CRE8 and Paper Plains. Prior to CRE8, Gibbon was the faculty advisor for the editorial board of an anthology "New Voices" and an all women's anthology called "Dust and Fire".

=== Author ===
Gibbon's 2010 novel Thief centers on the penpal relationship between Suzanne – who was raped in high school – and Alpha – a convicted rapist. As Suzanne and Alpha's relationship builds, Suzanne finds herself working through her sexual assault.

Gibbon's most recent novel, Paris Red, was featured on NPR's Weekend Edition Saturday with Scott Simon. It was also translated into French under the title Rouge Paris and published in 2014. The American release was in 2015 under the publisher W.W. Norton. Gibbon also wrote the prose collection Magdalena. She's been published in The New York Times, Huffington Post, Playboy and other publications. Gibbon received a Bush Foundation Artist fellowship in 2001, and a Loft McKnight Artists fellowship in 1992 and 1999. She became an artist in residence of the Mill Foundation at the Santa Fe Arts Institute in 2006.

== Personal life ==
Gibbon currently lives in Minnesota.

== Publications ==
=== Books and prose collections ===
- Paris Red: A Novel. W. W. Norton. 20 April 2015. ISBN 978-0-393-24447-2.
- Thief: A Novel. Farrar, Straus and Giroux. 27 April 2010. ISBN 978-1-4299-3236-3.
- Magdalena, White Pine Press, 2007, ISBN 9781893996830
- Swimming Sweet Arrow: A Novel. Little, Brown. 2001. ISBN 978-0-316-09310-1.

=== Other writing ===
- "My Rapist" (2006)
- "Review: 'Books and Islands in Ojibwe Country'" (2003)
- "Playboy: The Complete Centerfolds" (2007)
- "A Tale of Rape to Love or Hate" (2010)
