= Bemidji State University =

Public university in Bemidji, Minnesota, US

- Former names: Bemidji State Normal School (1919–1921); Bemidji State Teachers College (1921–1957); Bemidji State College (1957–1975)
- Type: Public university
- Established: 1919; 107 years ago
- Parent institution: Minnesota State system
- Academic affiliations: Space-grant
- Endowment: $54.5 million (2025)
- Budget: $98 million (2019)
- President: John Hoffman
- Provost: Allen Bedford
- Faculty: 246
- Students: 6,354
- Undergraduates: 5,912
- Postgraduates: 437
- Location: Bemidji, Minnesota, United States; 47.48175°N 94.87557°W
- Campus: Small city
- Colors: Hunter green and white
- Nickname: Beavers
- Sporting affiliations: NCAA: Division I – CCHA, WCHA; Division II – NSIC
- Mascot: Bucky the Beaver
- Website: bemidjistate.edu
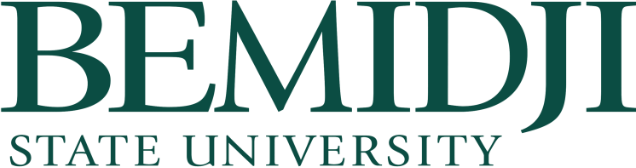

Bemidji State University (BSU) is a public university in Bemidji, Minnesota, United States. Founded as a preparatory institution for teachers in 1919, it provides higher education to north-central Minnesota. It is part of the Minnesota State Colleges and Universities system.

== History ==
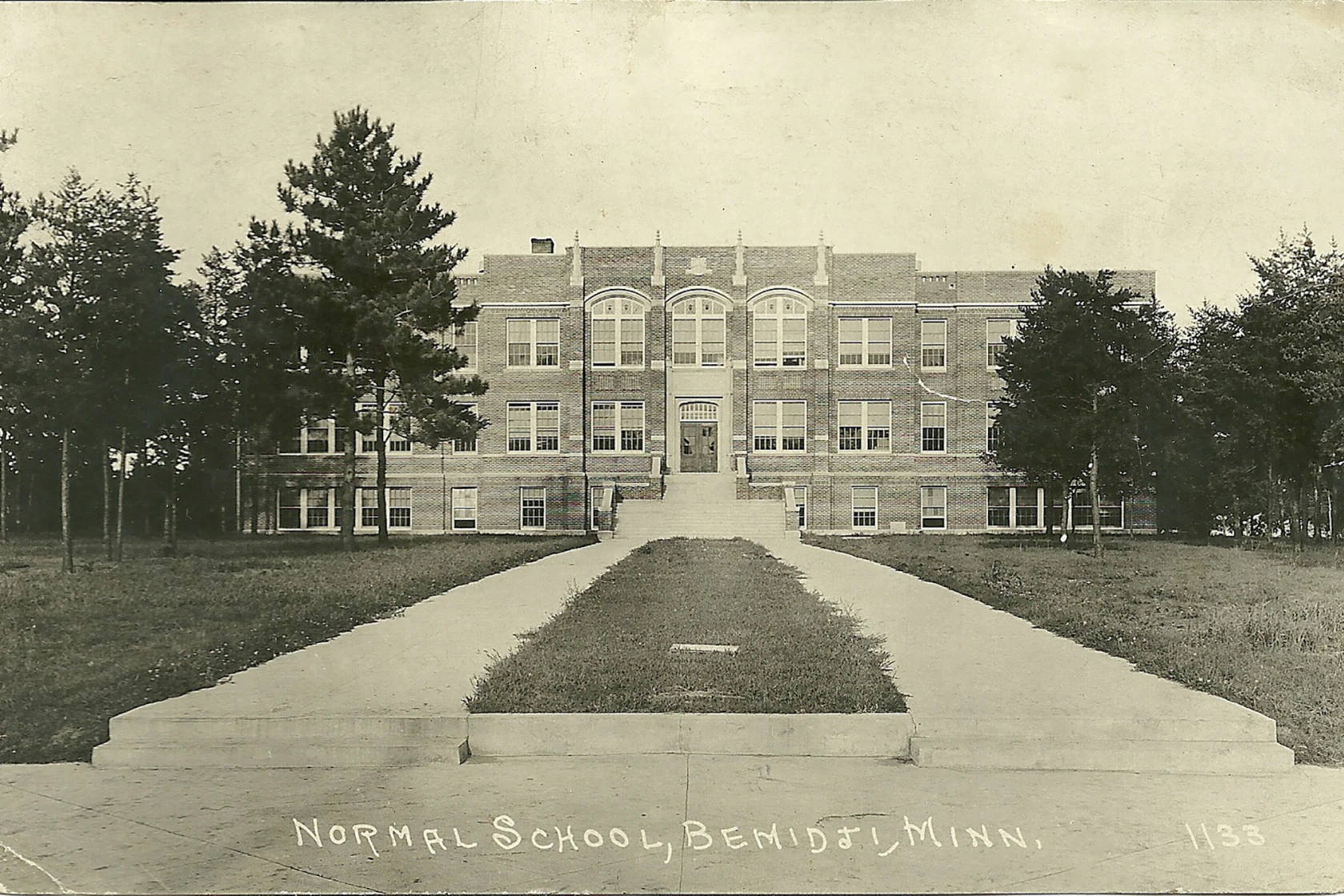
Deputy Hall in 1919, Bemidji State University

BSU was founded in 1919 and opened under the name "Bemidji State Normal School". The first president, Manfred Deputy, was appointed to run the new institution, and the first class consisted of 38 students. The name was changed to "Bemidji State Teachers College" in 1921, then shortened to "Bemidji State College" in 1957. In 1975, it took its current name, Bemidji State University. During the 1998–99 academic year, the Board of Trustees recommended changing the name of the university to Minnesota State University–Bemidji, to reflect a change toward unification within the newly formed Minnesota State Colleges and Universities System after other larger institutions had done so. Prominent vocal and written opposition from students, alumni, and local Bemidji residents forced the board to withdraw the recommendation to change the name.

Current enrollment is about 5,300, with students from 44 US states and 40 countries.

=== Presidents ===
Faith Hensrud was named Bemidji State University's eleventh president on April 20, 2016, and took office on July 1, 2016. She previously worked at the University of Wisconsin-Superior, having served as provost and vice chancellor for academic affairs since 2012. On August 13, 2021, Hensrud announced she would retire effective June 30, 2022.

There have been twelve presidents in the history of Bemidji State University.

	President	Years of service
1	Manfred W. Deputy	1919–1938
2	Charles R. Sattgast	1938–1964
3	Harry F. Bangsberg	1964–1967
4	R.D. Decker	1968–1980
5	Rebecca Stafford	1980–1982
6	Lowell Gillett	1982–1990
7	Leslie Duly	1990–1993
8	M. James Bensen	1994–2001
9	Jon E. Quistgaard	2001–2010
10	Richard Hanson	2010–2016
11	Faith Hensrud	2016–2022
12	John Hoffman	2022–present

== Academics ==
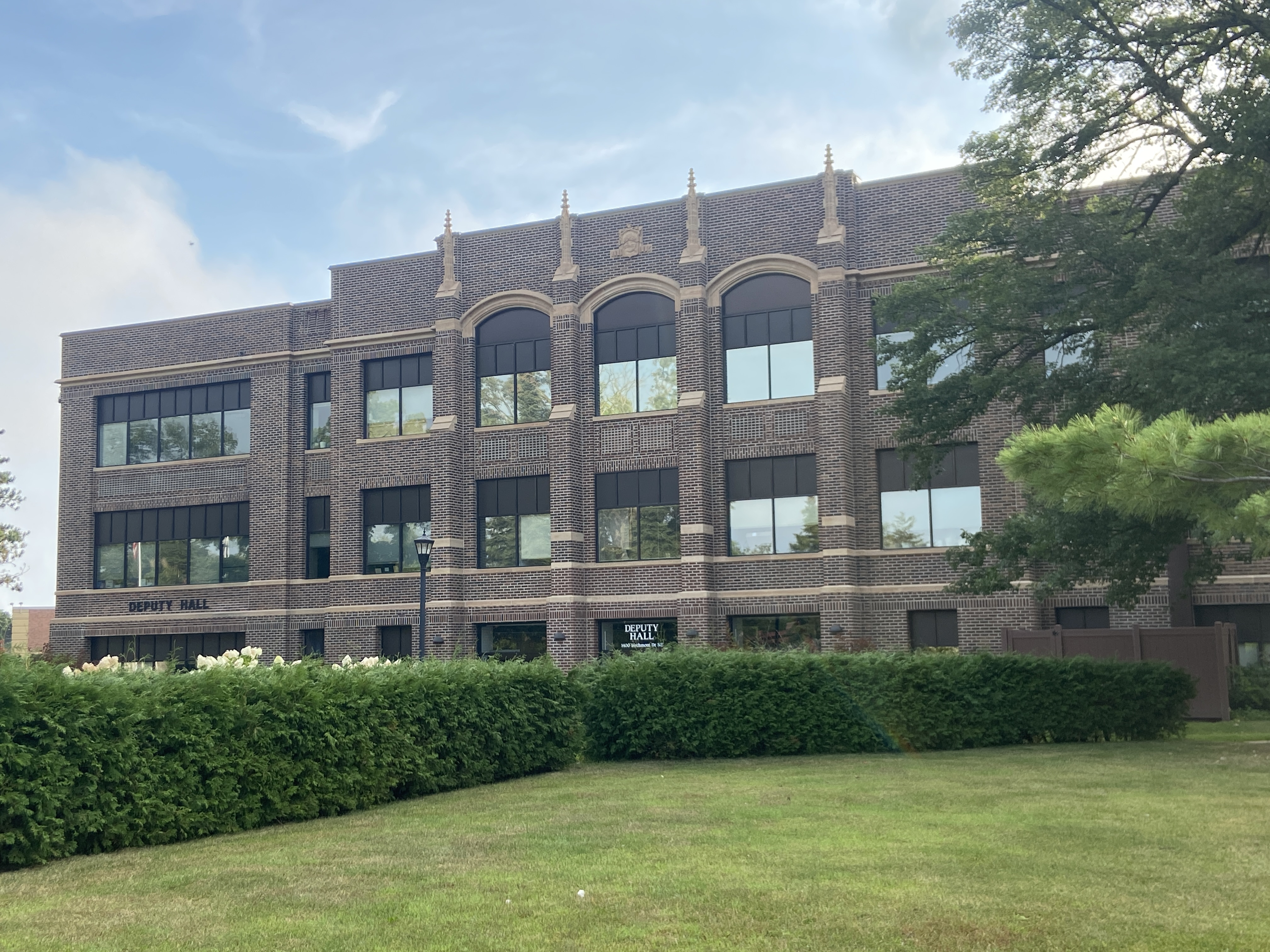
Deputy Hall in 2024

Bemidji State University offers 47 different areas of study. Many courses are available online. BSU offers the only BFA in professional and creative writing in the Minnesota State system. The program includes a minor and certificates in electronic writing, consisting of courses in weblogs, wikis, web content writing, web design, digital rhetoric, and teaching writing with technology. Another unique program at Bemidji State University is the Indigenous Sustainability Studies degree; this is the only such program in the United States. Bemidji State also has a 96% rate of social work majors passing their licensing exams compared to the 76% rate for the entire state. In addition, Sattgast Hall is home to a number of natural sciences programs and pre-professional studies.

Academic rankings

Master's
- Washington Monthly: 455

Regional
- U.S. News & World Report: 92

National
- Forbes: RNP

Bemidji State University accepts approximately 60% of students that apply. They also have an Honors Program which offers classes specific to participating students. Students from their honors program attend regional conferences.

=== Foreign programs ===
For 16 years BSU has had a relationship with Liaoning University, a university in China. Each year a professor from Liaoning University goes to BSU to teach Mandarin and each summer BSU students participate in "Sino-Summer", a month-long visit to China with half of the time spent at Liaoning University and half touring other parts of China including Beijing, Xi'an and Guilin.

== Student life ==
Undergraduate demographics as of Fall 2023
Race and ethnicity	Total
White	79%
Two or more races	6%
American Indian/Alaska Native	5%
Hispanic	4%
Black	3%
Asian	2%
International student	2%
Economic diversity
Low-income (Note: The percentage of students who received an income-based federal Pell grant intended for low-income students.)	31%
Affluent (Note: The percentage of students who are a part of the American middle class at the bare minimum.)	69%

=== Student government ===
The Bemidji State University Student Association holds weekly meetings where the student senate influences life on campus. The members of the student senate are from a diverse group of students based on a number of factors including their year in school. They are voted in by the students through popular elections.

=== Clubs and organizations ===
Bemidji State University provides over 100 clubs and organizations, both on and off campus. These clubs include interests in music, art, culture, outdoors, business, engineering, athletics, faith, and select majors and minors for students interested in research. Bemidji State only has two active Greek life organizations on campus, Theta Tau Epsilon fraternity and Delta Theta Kappa sorority.

=== Residence halls ===
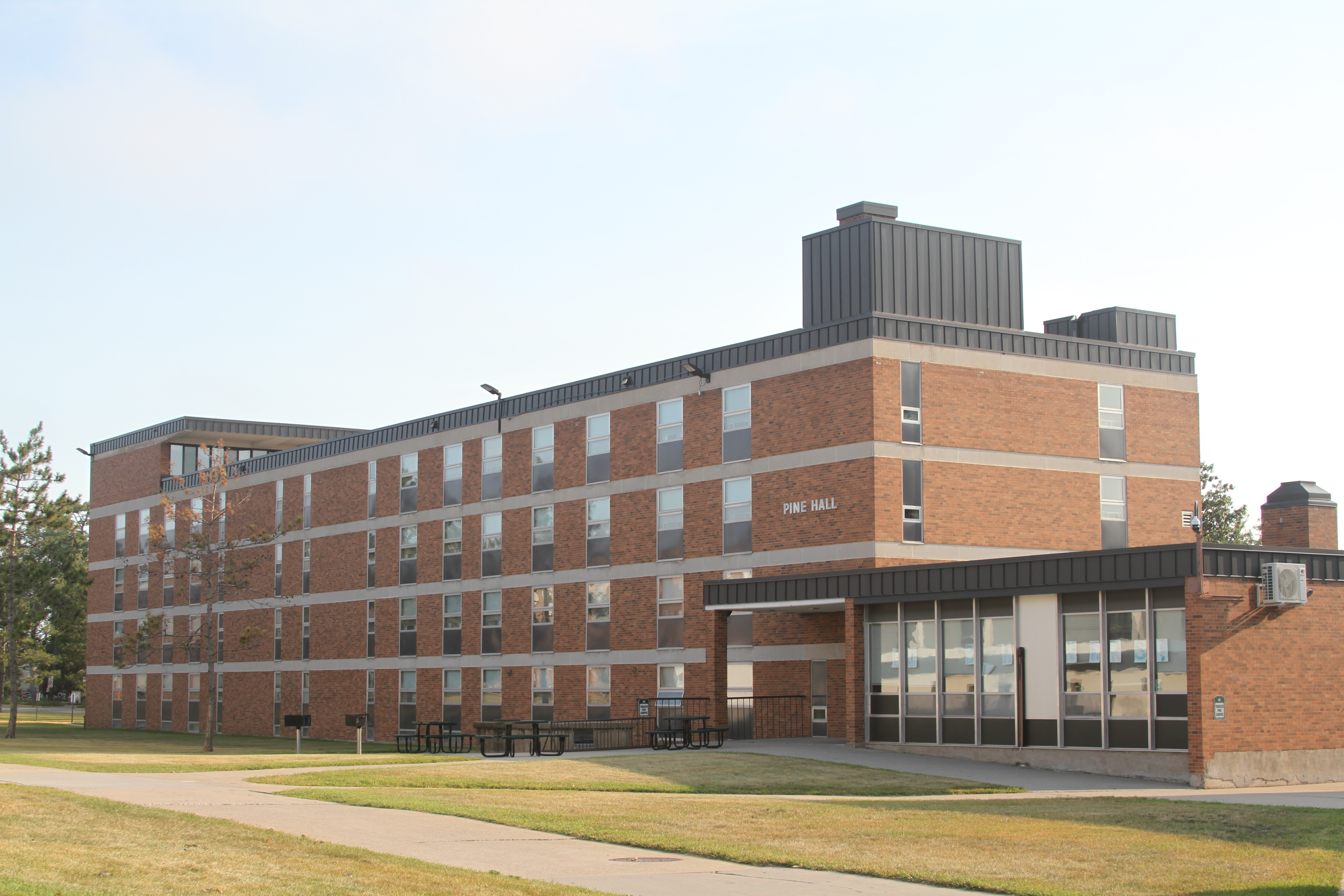
Pine Hall

The university has five residence halls (Linden, Pine, Birch, Oak, and Tamarack), as well as Cedar and University Heights apartments. Freshmen are required to live in either Oak Hall or Tamarack Hall, with few exceptions. Linden offers suites that house two to three people. Pine has single-gender floors with single rooms or two person dorms. Birch is the closest dorms to the academic buildings, and has single and double dorm rooms. Cedar Apartments offers single parents a place to live on campus. It provides a fenced outdoor playground and an indoor play area for children. Tamarack Hall is the tallest building in Beltrami County.

=== Sustainability ===
Bemidji State University is taking steps to reduce their environmental impact and have pledged to be carbon-neutral by 2050. They have an office on campus devoted to sustainability efforts. The sustainability office provides a bike rental service for students called "Bucky's Bikes" and a place where items may be donated and are given away to students at no charge. The Sustainability Office is funded by a student "green fee" of $7.50 a semester.

=== Homecoming tradition ===
In a tradition dating back to the mid-1990s, anytime the team wins homecoming, the players run from the football stadium to nearby Lake Bemidji and dive in. The tradition dates to 1995 when Bemidji State upset the defending conference champion Winona State University in the homecoming game and took their first "victory dip" in the lake. The roots of the tradition date back two years earlier however when, in 1993, an assistant coach attempted to inspire the winless team. He wrote a fictional news story of the upcoming homecoming game. In his account, the team earned an upset homecoming victory and dove into Lake Bemidji in celebration. A real-world victory didn't happen in 1993, nor 1994, but when homecoming victory came in 1995 it was time to get wet. Between 1995 and 2012 the Beavers have won twelve of the seventeen homecoming games.

=== Student publications and news sources ===
Bemidji State University has several student-run publications and news sources. They include CRE8 magazine, the Northern Student Magazine, and KBSU-TV, KBSU FM 90.

CRE8 showcases creative works by writers and artists from northern Minnesota. CRE8 accepts fiction and nonfiction submissions with a word count of 4,000 or less and poetry submissions of 75 lines or less per poem. English instructor Maureen Gibbon created the online magazine.

In 2019, the English department launched the new student publication Paper Plains, with Maureen Gibbon in position as the academic advisor.

The Northern Student became Bemidji State's campus newspaper in 1926. Since its conception, the newspaper has been solely staffed and managed by students, as well as published and distributed weekly at no charge to its readers. In the early 70s, the Northern Student merged with the Mass Comm. Dept. at the influence of James McMahon, the public relations director for Bemidji State at the time, who also served as the newspaper's adviser. In 1988, the newspaper was produced through Newspaper Production, a three-credit Mass Comm. course taught and advised by Louise Mengelkoch. During this period, the Northern Student stopped receiving funds from the Student Activity Fee Allocation Committee, and was produced strictly on advertising revenue. After a lawsuit, the Northern Student and Mass Comm. Dept. separated in 1992, and the newspaper relocated to the Hobson Memorial Union. Al Nohner, director of Communications and Marketing, created a media board of faculty, students, and community members to choose future editors-in-chief and advisers, as well as to advise the newspaper. A few years later, the Northern Student began receiving funds from the Student Activity Fee Allocation Committee again. For over a decade the Northern Student functioned outside the Mass Comm. Dept. In the fall of 2009, the paper was without an adviser. After the paper was threatened with a lawsuit, the media board appointed an adviser, who was forced to retire less than a year later. In May 2010, the newspaper returned to the Mass Comm. Dept., the media board was disbanded, and a new adviser from the Mass Comm. Dept. was appointed. During the following fall, the Northern Student briefly partnered with the Bemidji Pioneer for advertising and began placing issues of the Bemidji Pioneer inside the Northern Student. After three months of publication, it was determined that the two newspapers should remain completely separate.

== Athletics ==
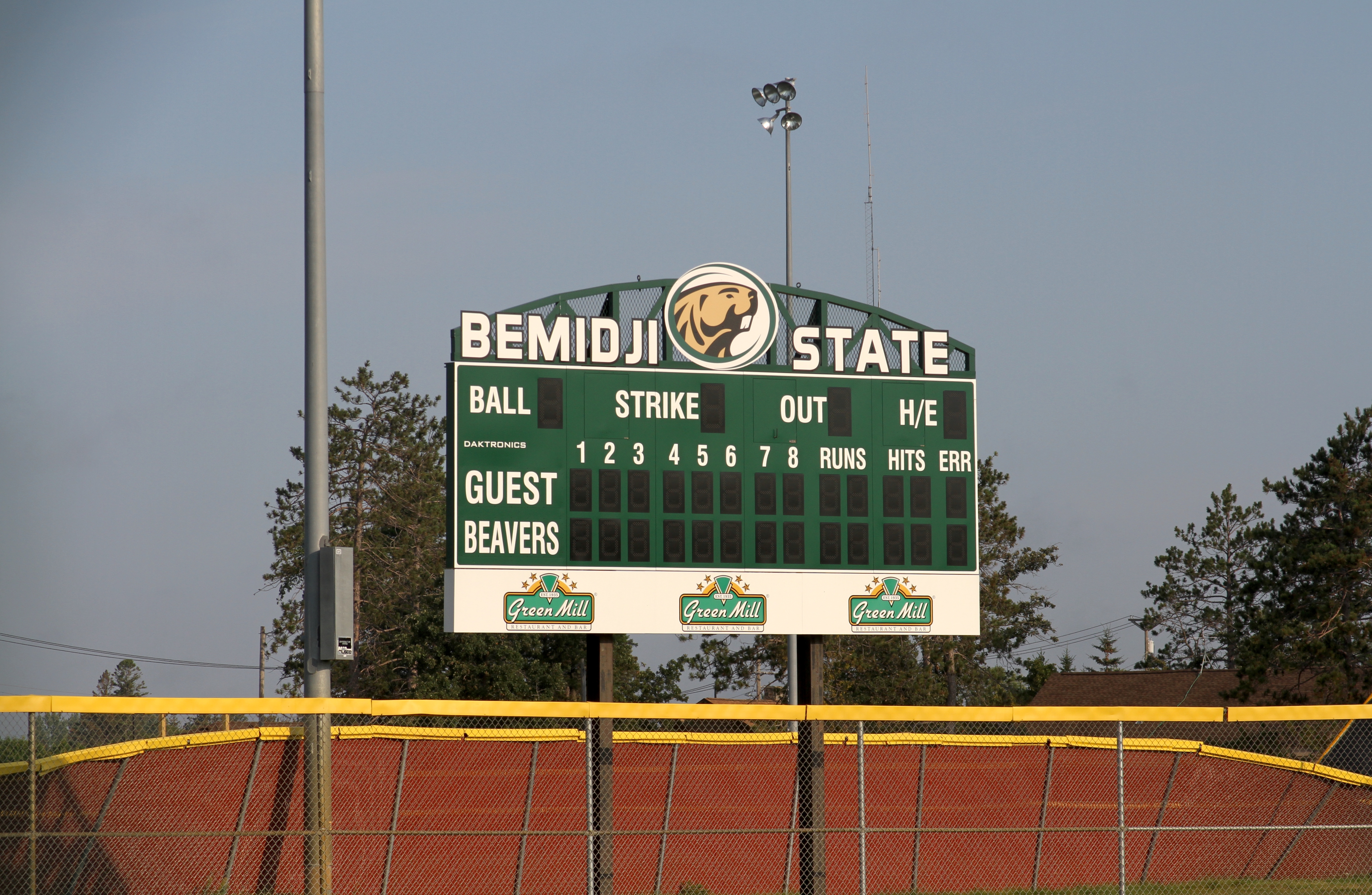
Baseball field scoreboard

The school sports teams are called the Beavers. They are members of the Northern Sun Intercollegiate Conference competing in NCAA Division II, with the exception of men's and women's ice hockey teams, which compete in the Central Collegiate Hockey Association and the Western Collegiate Hockey Association at the NCAA Division I level, respectively.

=== Men's ===
- Baseball
- Basketball
- Football
- Golf
- Ice hockey

=== Women's ===
- Basketball
- Cross country
- Golf
- Ice hockey
- Soccer
- Softball
- Tennis
- Track and field
- Volleyball

== Notable alumni ==
- John A. Ainley Jr., newspaperman and politician
- Rita Albrecht, public servant
- Glen H. Anderson, served in the Minnesota House of Representatives from 1973 – 1990
- Trent Baalke, general manager, Jacksonville Jaguars
- Robert Baril, stand-up comedian
- Steve Bell, football coach
- Bob Bird, politician
- Lem Burnham, NFL player
- John Carlson, politician
- Matt Climie, NHL goalie
- Bob Dettmer, politician
- Dhel Duncan-Busby, CFL receiver
- Rocky Dwyer, professor
- Rob Ecklund, politician
- James Ellisor, basketball player
- Roger Erickson, politician
- Rich Glas, basketball coach
- Frank Haege, professional and college head football coach
- Bob Johnson, politician, farmer, school social worker
- Aaron Kallhoff, college basketball coach
- Brian Leonhardt, NFL tight end
- Michele Leonhart, administrator at the Drug Enforcement Administration
- D. J. LeRoy, football coach
- Andrew Murray, NHL center
- Bob Ness, politician
- Gunner Olszewski, NFL wide receiver
- Marion O'Neill, politician
- Joel Otto, NHL center
- Matt Read, NHL center
- Loren Solberg, politician
- Thomas D. Waldhauser, USMC, Commander of US Africa Command
- Christopher Waller, economist, member of the Federal Reserve Board of Governors
- Patricia Walrath, politician
- Zach Whitecloud, NHL defenseman, Vegas Golden Knights

== Gallery ==
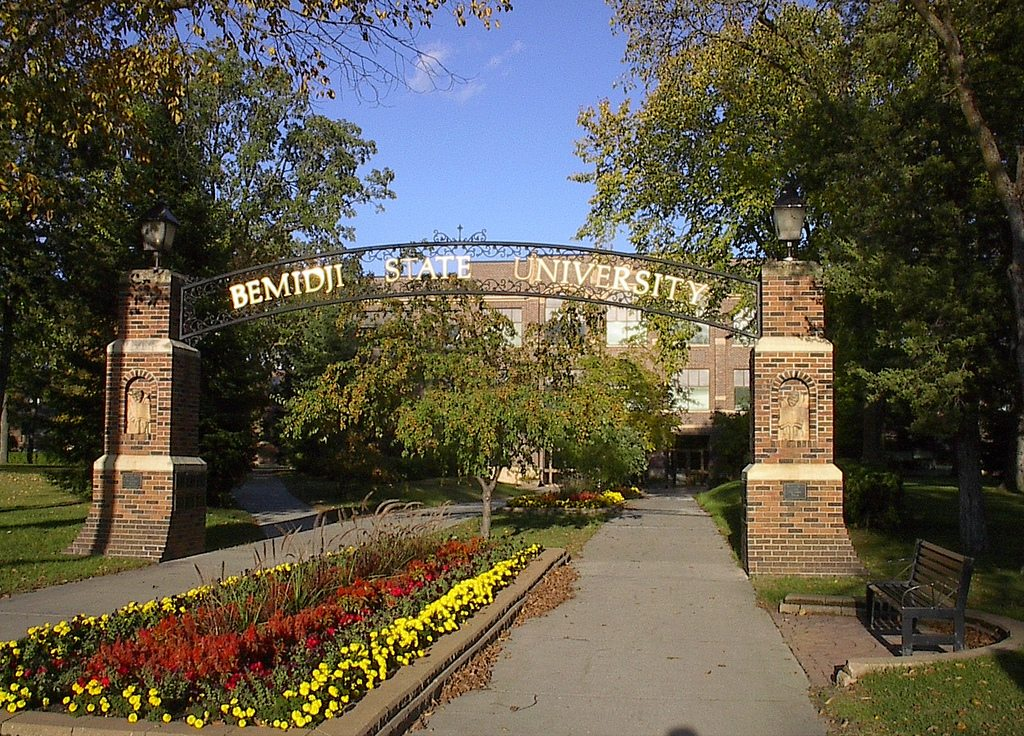
Alumni Arch

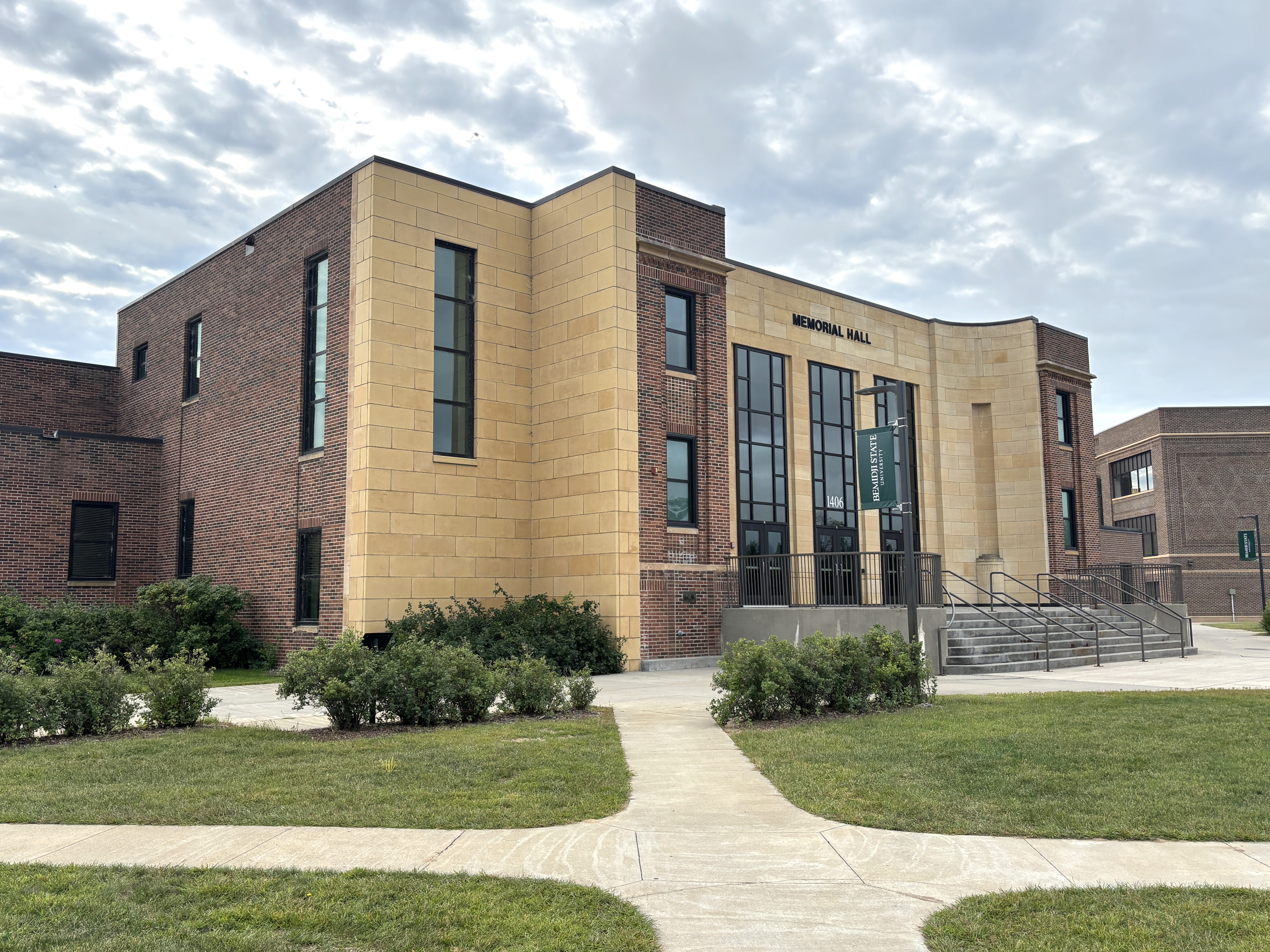
Memorial Hall

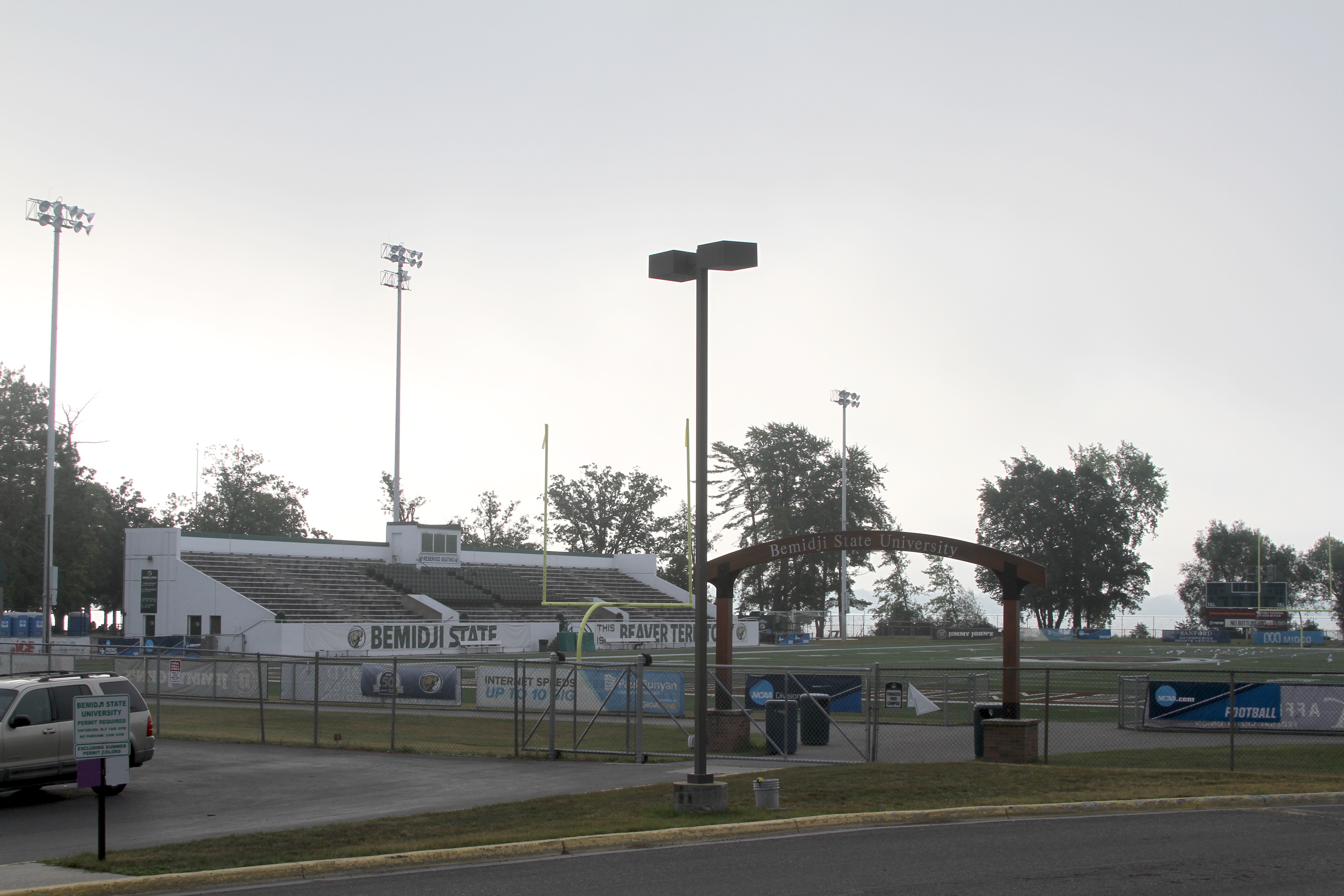
Chet Anderson Stadium

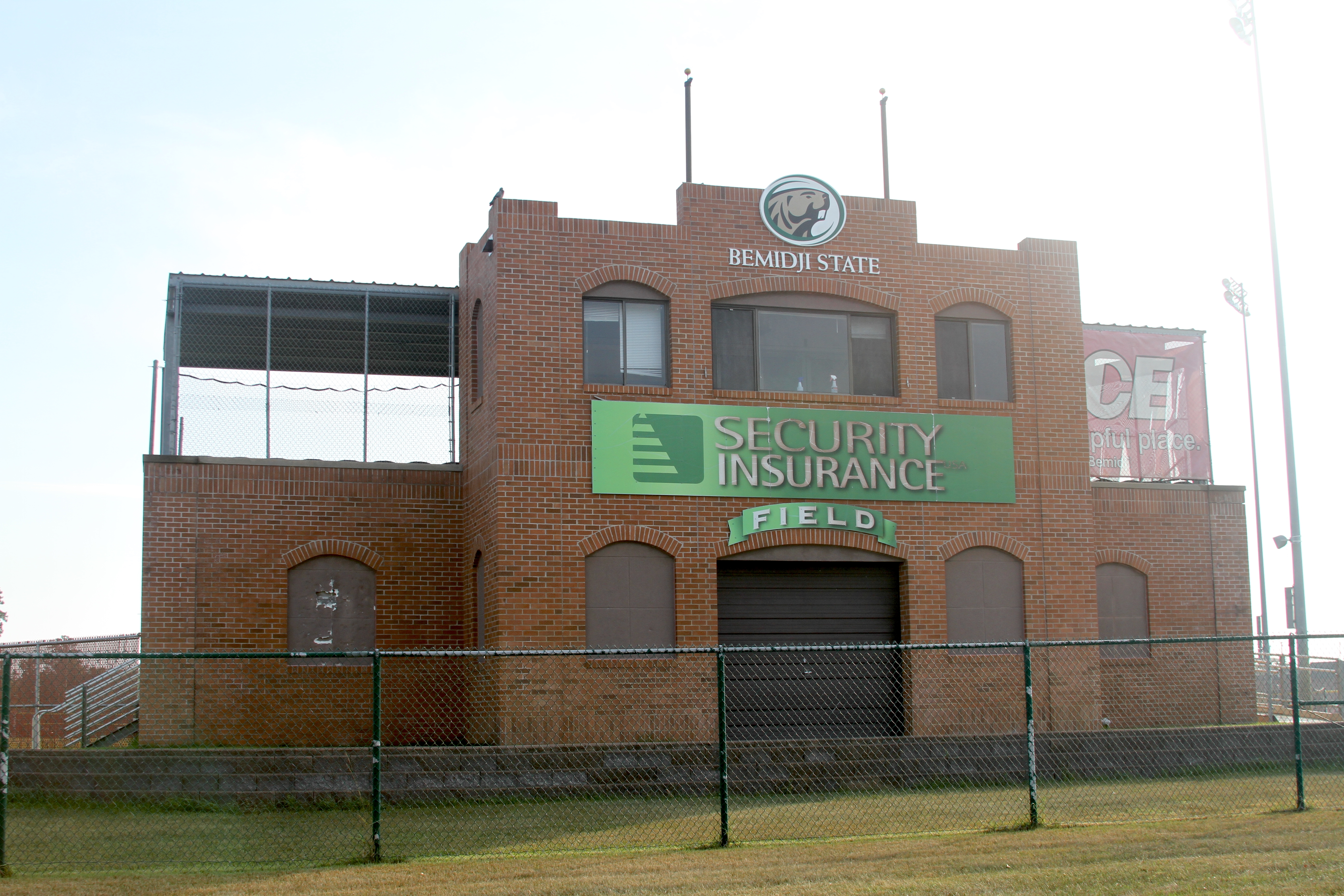
Baseball field Grandstand

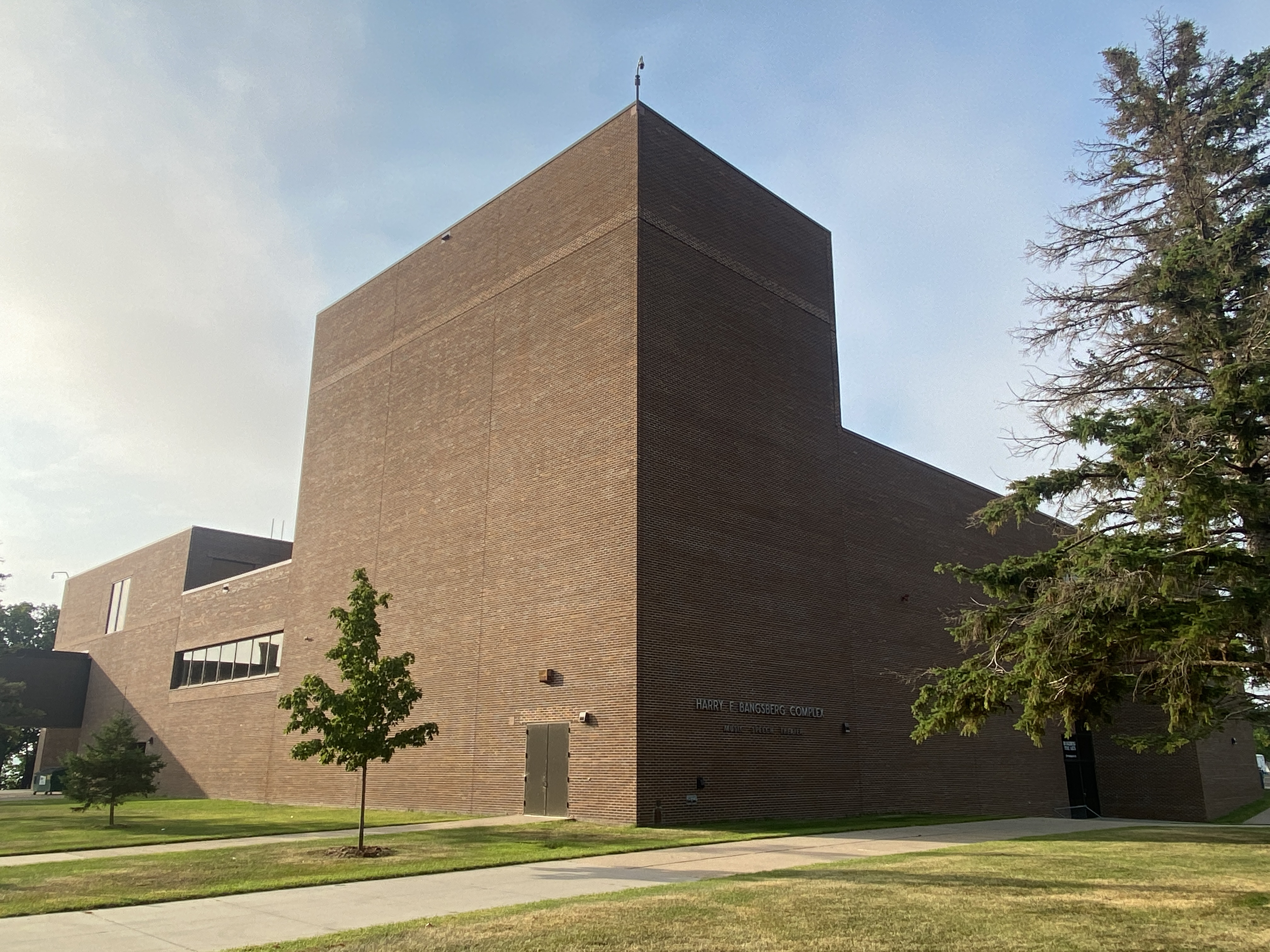
Harry F. Bangsberg Fine Arts Complex

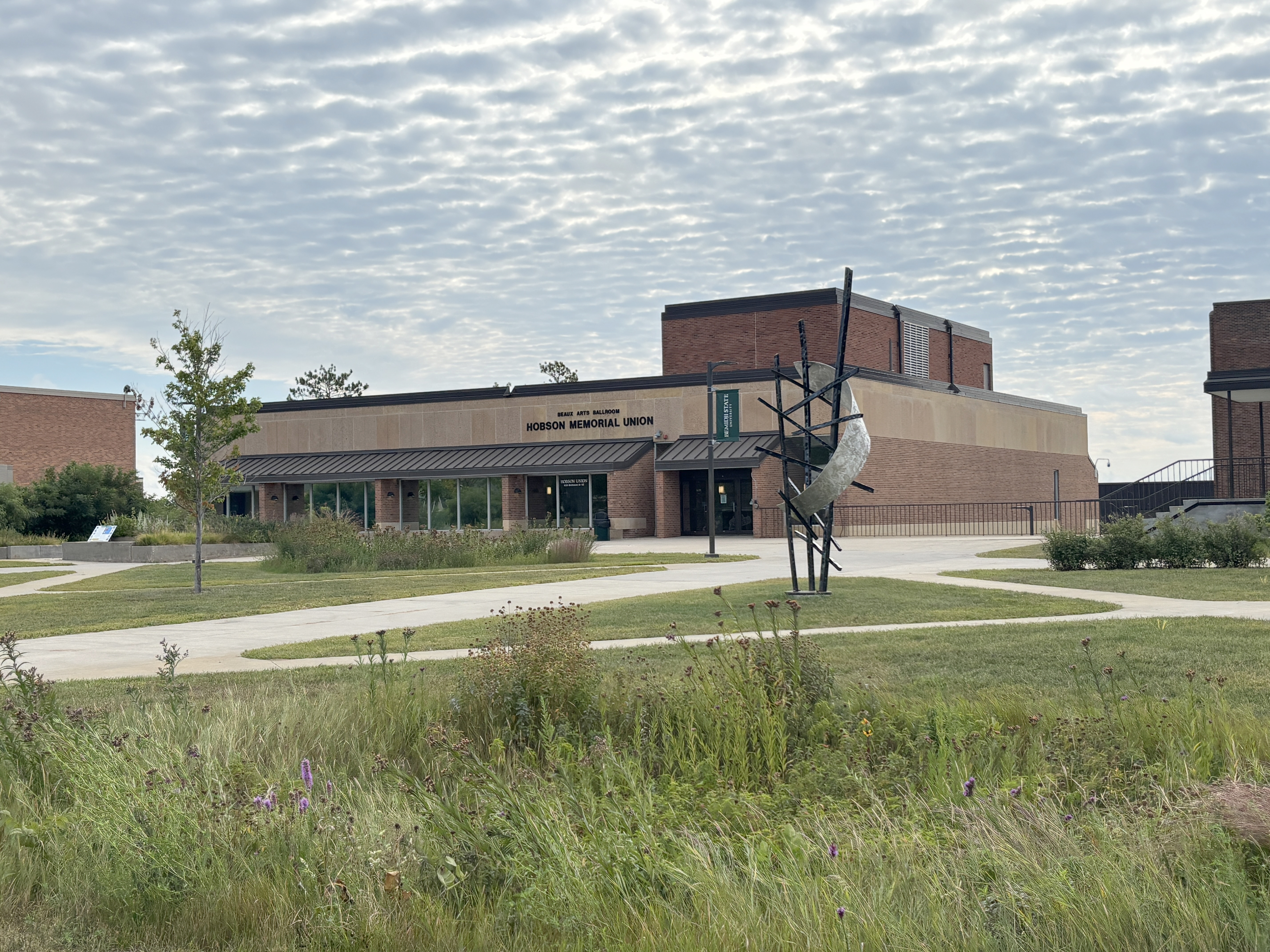
Hobson Union--Beaux Arts Ballroom

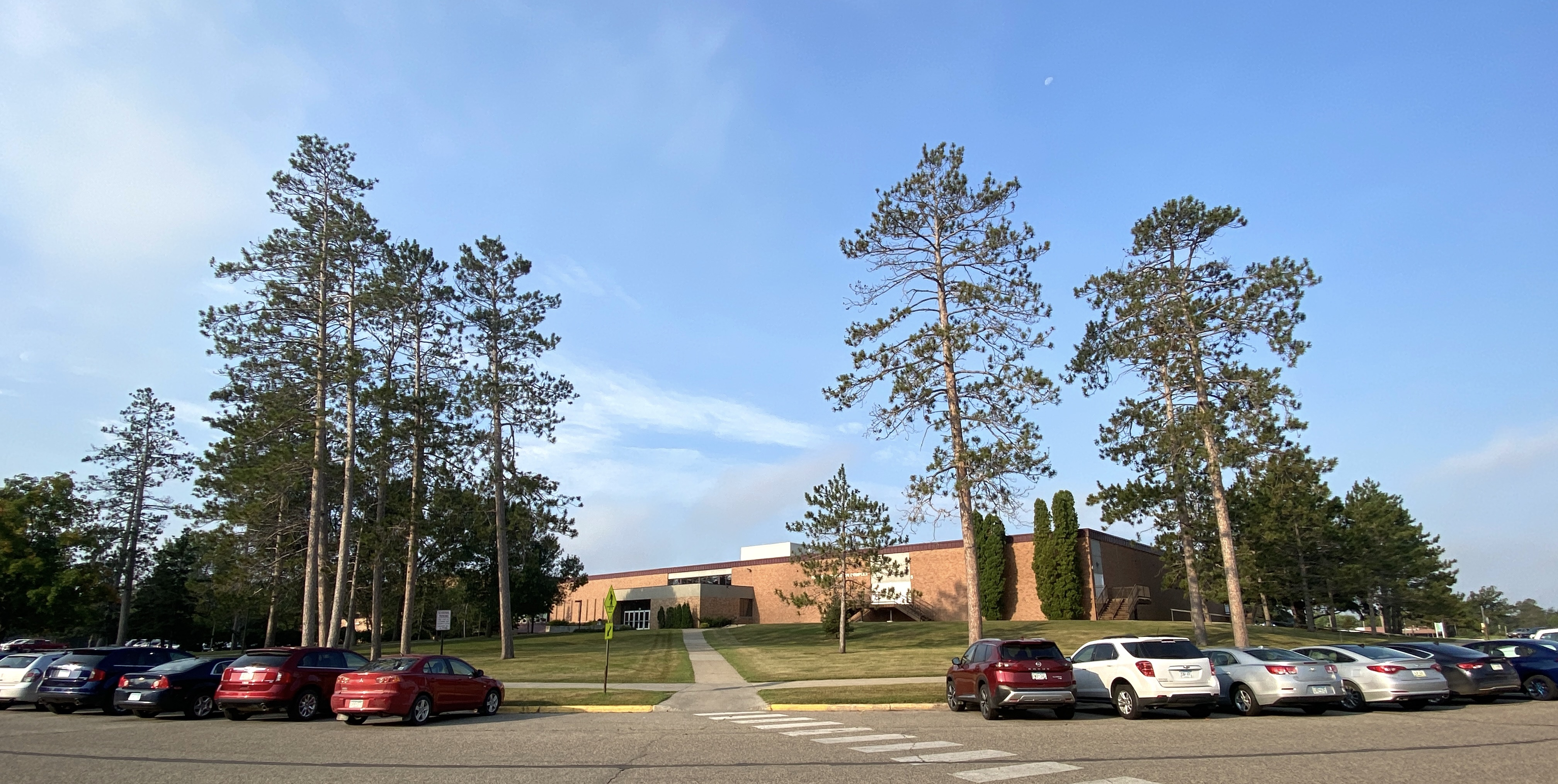
Physical Education Complex

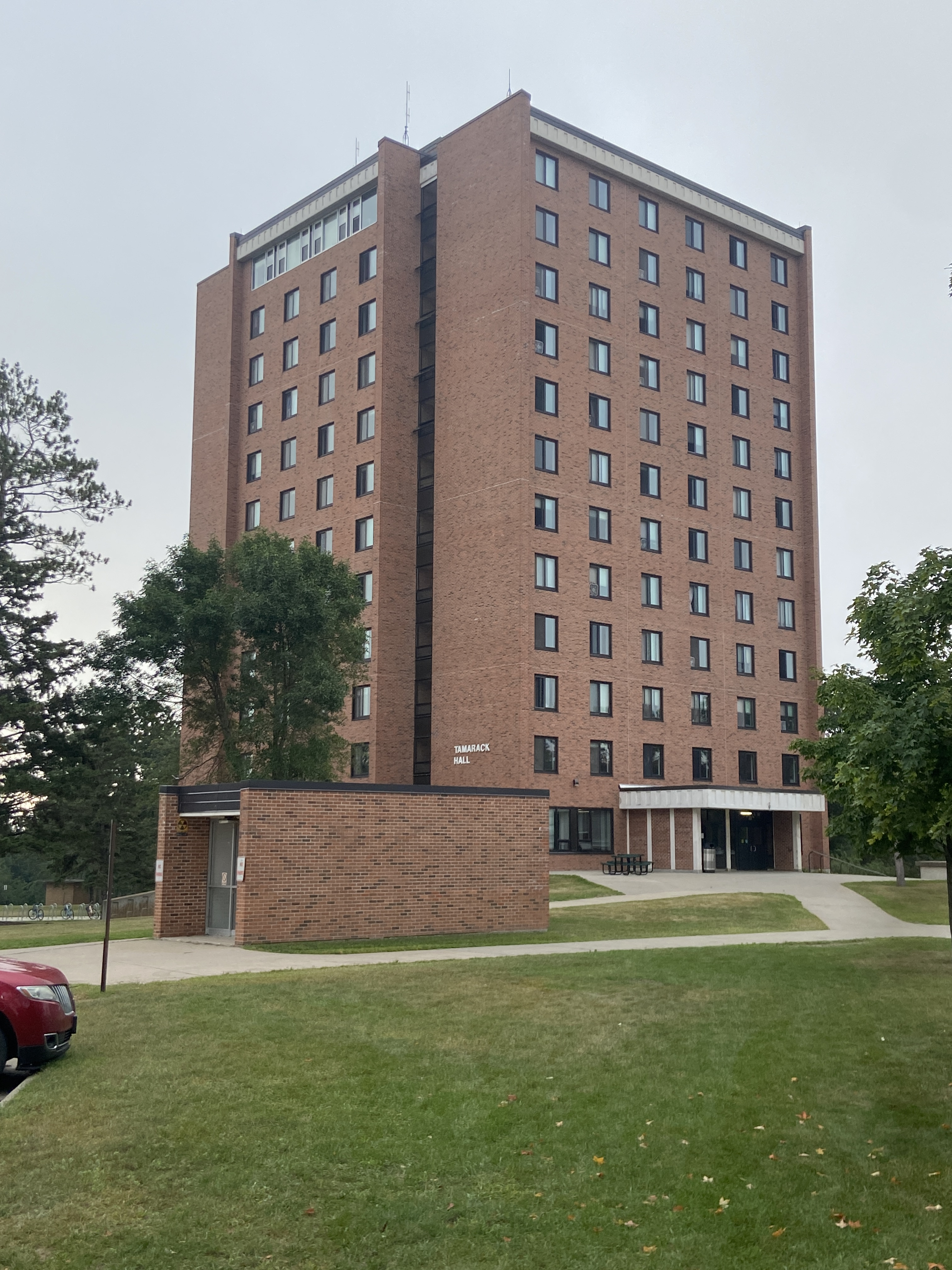
Tamarack Hall

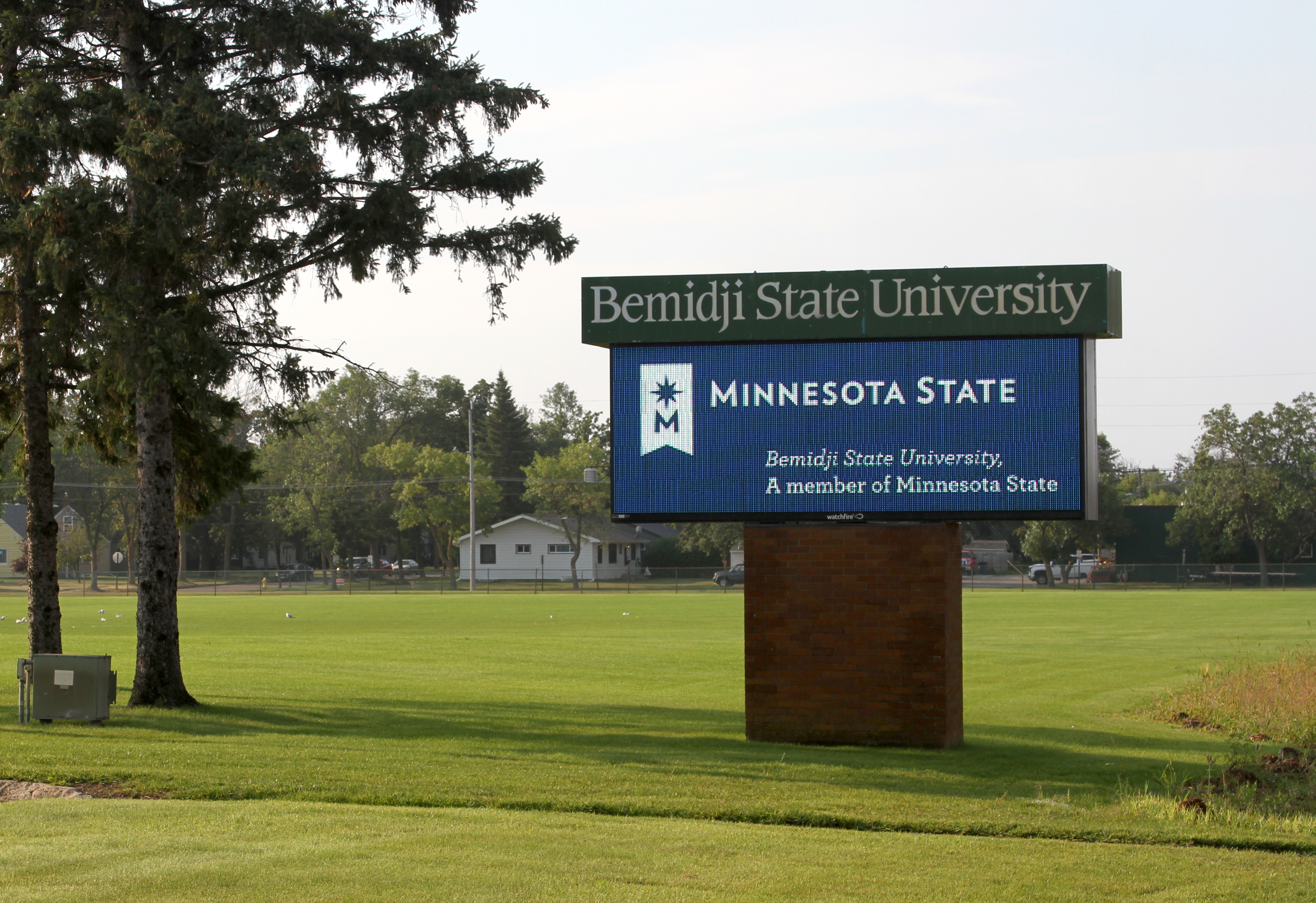
Message sign

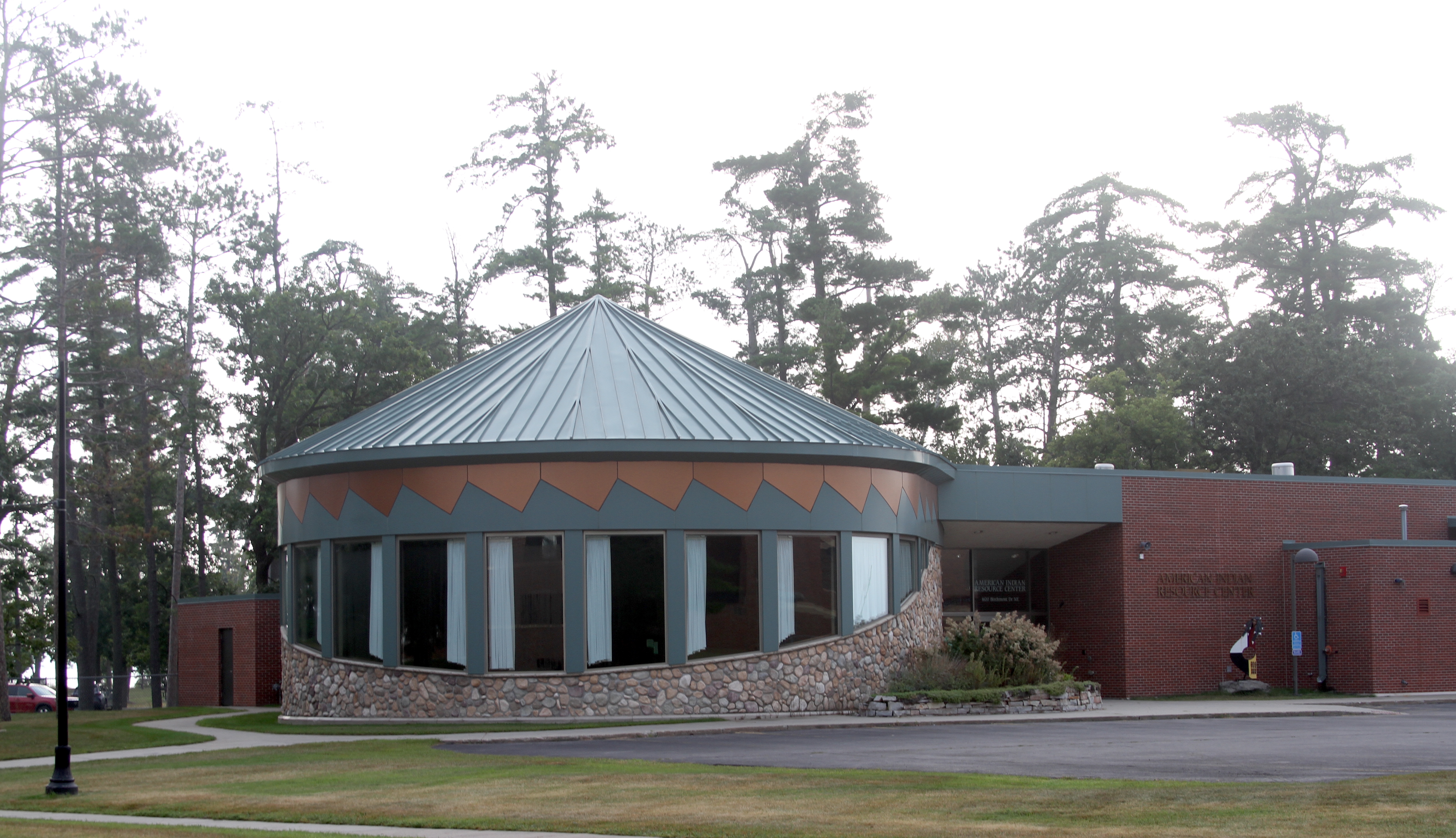
American Indian Resource Center

== See also ==
- List of colleges and universities in Minnesota
- Higher education in Minnesota
