= Edith Standen =

American museum curator and military officer

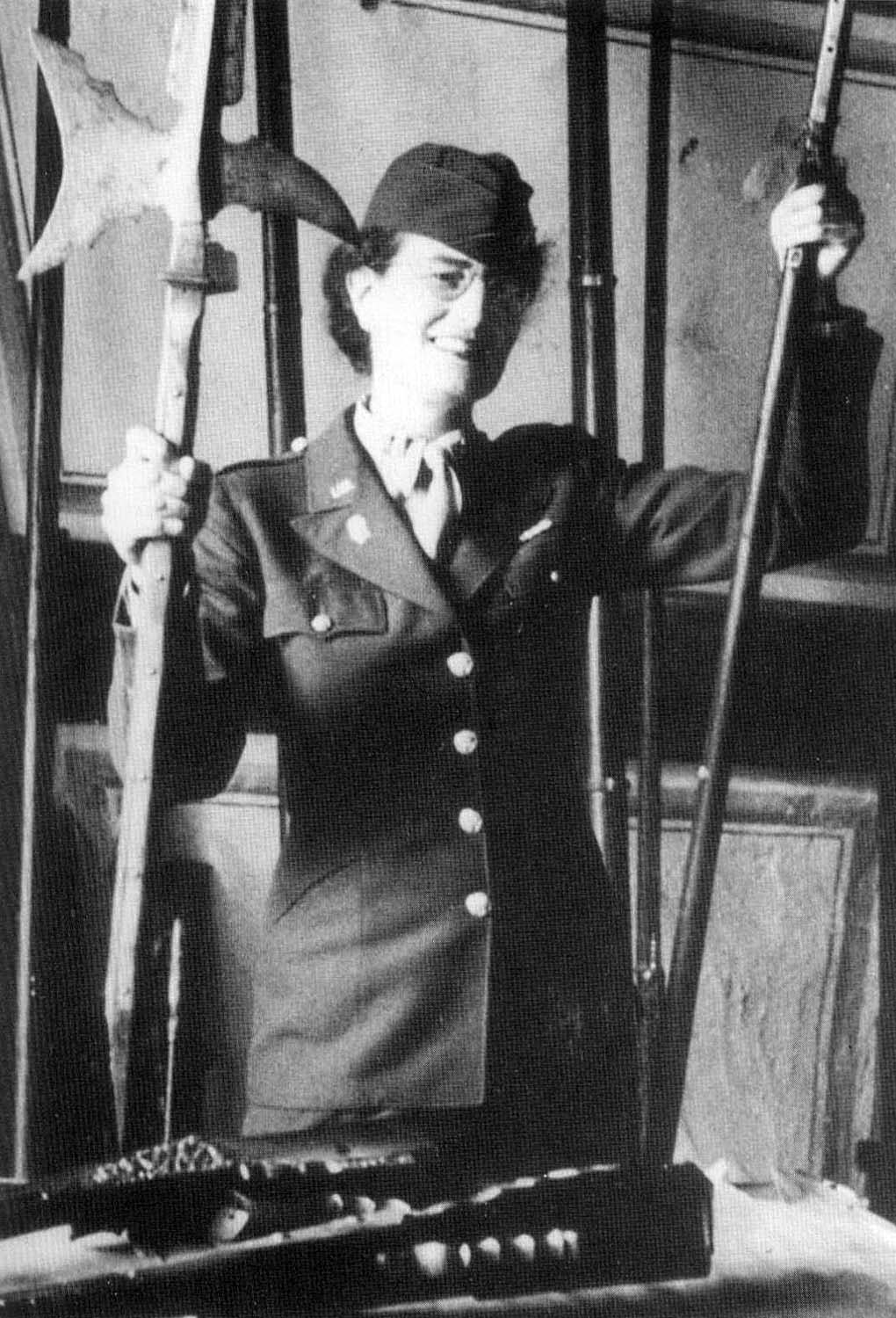
Edith Standen at the Central Collecting Point Wiesbaden, 1946

Edith Standen (February 21, 1905 – July 17, 1998) was an American museum curator and military officer, best known as an expert on tapestries and as one of the "Monuments Men" who located and protected art works after World War II.

== Early life and education ==
Edith Appleton Standen was born in Halifax, Nova Scotia in 1905. Her father Robert Hargreave Fraser Standen was a British Army officer, born in India. Her mother Eleanor Armistead Sumner was born in Paris to American parents. Edith was raised in England and Ireland. Standen earned a B. A. at Somerville College, Oxford in 1926. After moving to the United States she gained further training in museum studies at the Fogg Art Museum, under Paul J. Sachs.

== Career ==
In 1928 Standen emigrated to the United States to work at the Society for the Preservation of New England Antiquities, which was founded by her uncle, William Sumner Appleton. The following year, she took a job with art collector Joseph E. Widener in Elkins Park, Pennsylvania.

She worked on the transfer of Widener holdings to the new National Gallery of Art in 1942. That same year, she joined the Women's Army Corps, and in 1945 was assigned to the Monuments, Fine Arts, and Archives program in Germany. She signed the Wiesbaden manifesto and served for one year as Director and Officer-in-Charge at Wiesbaden Collection Center before she was discharged in 1947.

Upon return to civilian life, Standen became associate curator of Textiles at the Metropolitan Museum of Art in New York City. She published a two-volume guide, European Post-Medieval Tapestries and Related Hangings in the Metropolitan Museum of Art (1985), and dozens of scholarly articles on tapestries and textiles. Standen retired from curator work in 1970, but continued as a consultant and curator emeritus until 1988.

Standen received a Women's Caucus for Art Lifetime Achievement Award in 1988. From 1986 to 1993, already in her eighties, she compiled a biennial newsletter on tapestries, Navette-Shuttle.

== Personal life and legacy ==
Standen became a US citizen in 1942. She died in July 1998, age 93.

Standen donated her papers to the Gallery Archives, National Gallery of Art, Washington D. C.
