= David Röell =

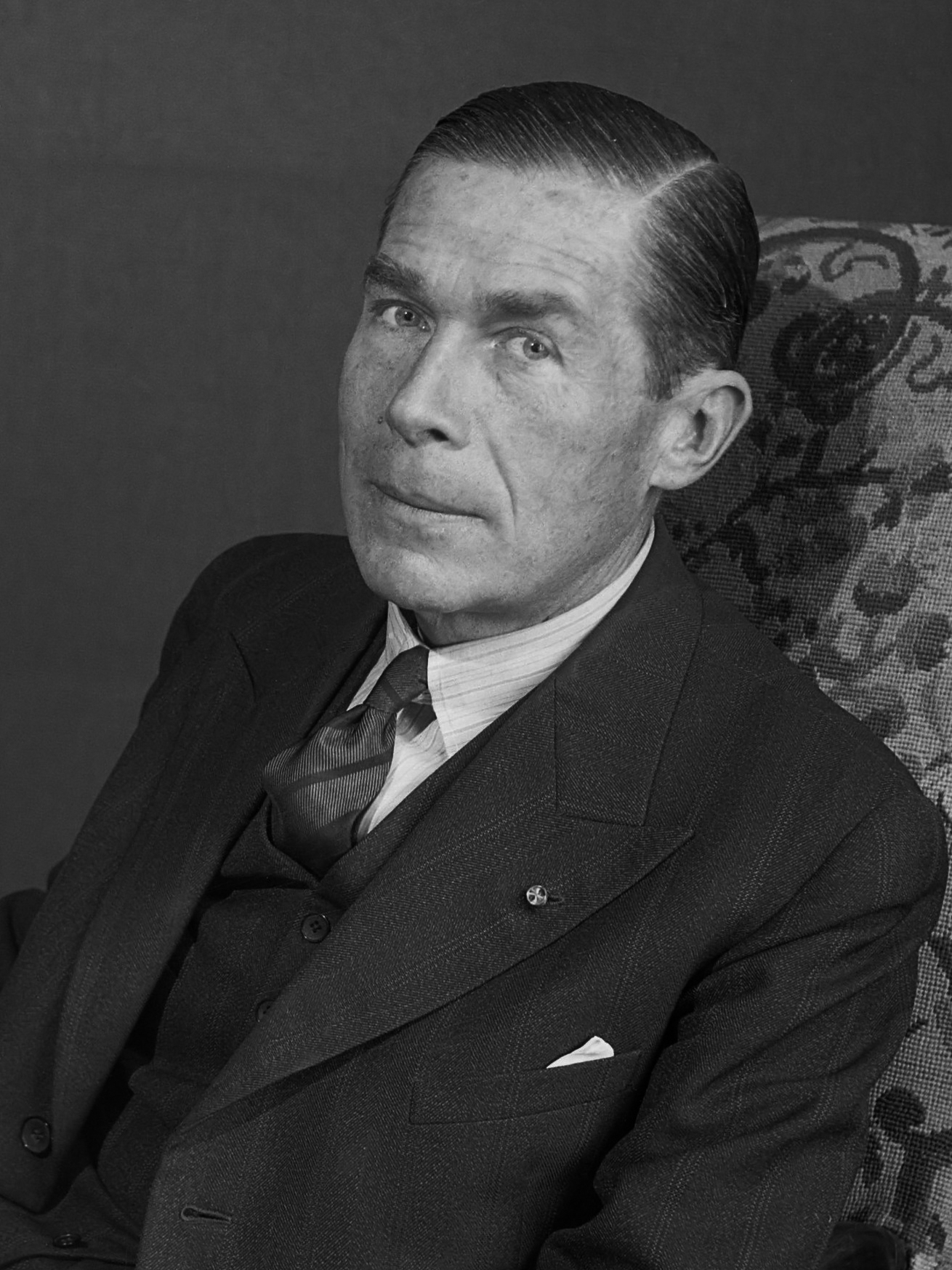
David Röell (1945)

David Cornelis Röell (23 November 1894 – 3 December 1961) was a Dutch museum director.

== Life ==
David Röell was born in Utrecht on 23 November 1894. He studied law and later art history at Utrecht University, after which he worked at the Sorbonne and the École du Louvre on a dissertation on Daniel Marot, which he did not finish. By organizing an exhibition he came into contact with Frederik Schmidt Degener and through him he was appointed to the Rijksmuseum Amsterdam, where he worked from 1924 to 1936. He became curator of the department of painting after three years. He wrote a catalogue of paintings in the Rijksmuseum, which was published in 1934.

Between 1936 and 1945 Röell was director of the museums of Amsterdam, including the Stedelijk Museum, the Historical Museum and the Willet-Holthuysen Museum. He also organized major international exhibitions, and was responsible for a number of extraordinary purchases of international modern art. He directed the museum during the period of Nazi occupation. He worked with Dr Alfred Stange of Bonn University, a member of Board of Directors of German Institute for History of Art in Paris.

Röell was the Rijksmuseum's chief director from 1945 to 1959, succeeding his mentor Schmidt-Degener. Röell renovated and reorganized. In 1952 the entire museum became accessible again and Röell organized successful exhibitions, such as Rembrandt (1956) and Medieval Art in the Northern Netherlands (1958).

In June 1945 Röell co-founded the Netherlands Art Property Foundation and was appointed its chairman. In 1958 Röell became an honorary doctor of the University of Amsterdam. The following year he retired. He died in Amsterdam on 3 December 1961.

== Monuments Man ==
After World War II, Röell became the chief representative of the Dutch government for the restitution of looted works of art. He participated in the activities for the recovery of thousands of works of art and cultural objects looted by the Nazis. His activities developed mainly in the warehouses of Maastricht and Zandvoort, where the objects returned to the Netherlands had to be sorted in order to return them to the museums or private owners to whom they belonged.

The storage place in Zandvoort was organized by the Germans. In 1942, part of it was transferred to a bunker near Maastricht. In Steenwijk near Maastricht, a so-called Reich shelter was built for looted works of art. Prominent Duisers visited there to make their selection.

From the liberation of the area on 17 April 1945, Monuments Men came on site and inspected the storage facilities. Röell was put in possession of the keys that locked the buildings. In August 1945, the operations of restitution began. The Stedelijk Museum celebrated the return of the artworks with a major Vincent van Gogh exhibition.

Röell remained involved in the activities of the Monuments Men until 1950.

== David Roëllprijs ==
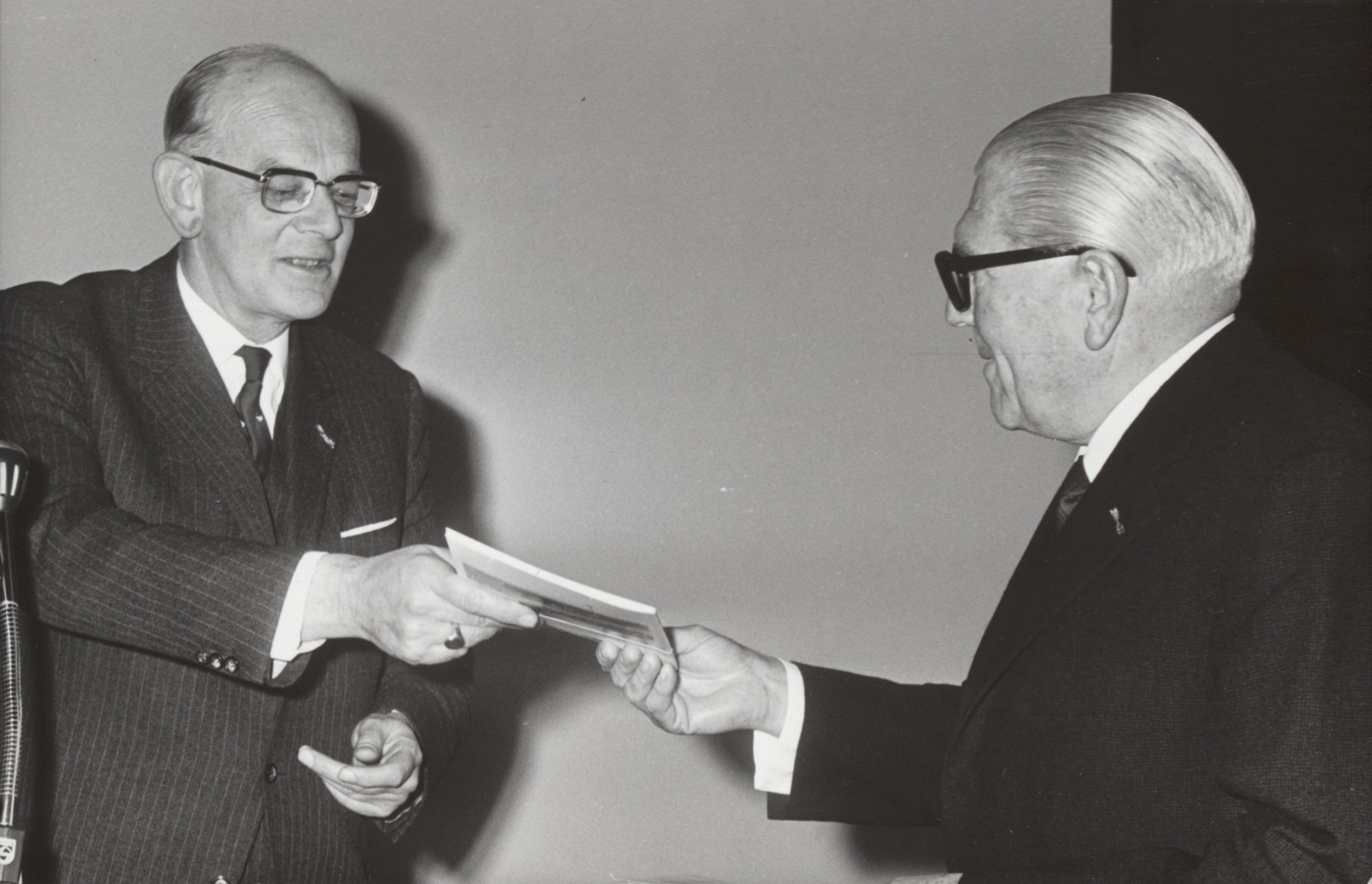
David Roëll Prize 1968 awarded to Prof. Van Eesteren at Rijksmuseum

An oeuvre prize awarded by the Prince Bernhard Fund is named after him: the David Röell Prize

== Publications ==
- Geschiedkundig overzicht der verzamelingen, in: Catalogus der schilderijen, miniaturen, pastels, omlijste tekeningen enz. in het Rijksmuseum te Amsterdam. Amsterdam, 1934.

== Literature ==
- A. VAN SCHENDEL, Bij het afscheid van de hoofddirecteur Röell, in: Bulletin van het Rijksmuseum, 1959.
- A. STARING, Obituary D.C. Röell, in: The Burlington Magazine, 1962.
- F. VAN LENNEP, David Cornelis Röell, in: Jaarboek van de Maatschappij der Nederlandse Letterkunde te Leiden, 1962–1963.
- Pieter J.J. VAN THIEL e.a. (eds), All the Paintings of the Rijksmuseum in Amsterdam: a completely illustrated catalogue, by the department of Paintings of the Rijksmuseum, Maarssen, G. Schwartz, 1976 (herwerking en aanvulling van de catalogus uit 1934).
- John JANSSEN VAN GALEN & Huib SCHREURS, Het huis van nu, waar de toekomst is. Een kleine historie van het Stedelijk Museum Amsterdam, 1895-1995, Naarden, 1995.
- Gijs VAN DER HAM, 200 jaar Rijksmuseum. Geschiedenis van een nationaal symbool, Zwolle, Waanders, 2000.

== See also ==
- Monuments Men
- List of Claims for Restitution for Nazi-looted art
- Nazi plunder
