= Charles Percy Parkhurst =

American museum curator

- Born: January 23, 1913; Columbus, Ohio, U.S.
- Died: June 25, 2008 (aged 95)
- Education: Williams College; Princeton University
- Occupation: Curator
- Known for: Roberts Commission

Charles Percy Parkhurst (January 23, 1913 – June 25, 2008) was an American museum curator best known for his work on the Roberts Commission, tracking down art looted during World War II.

== Early years ==
Charles Percy Parkhurst was born in 1913 in Columbus, Ohio. He entered Oberlin College as a music major, then later a physics student, but after the science department prohibited him from conducting a personal research project, he transferred to Williams College. At Williams, Parkhurst initially studied geology but was inspired by Professor Karl E. Weston, the founder of the Williams College Museum of Art, to major in fine arts and pursue a career in the field. Following his graduation from Williams in 1935, Parkhurst spent the next two years building bridges and roads in Alaska before returning to Oberlin for an M.A., which he completed in 1938. At the urging of his mentor, Clarence Ward, Parkhurst went on to obtain an M.F.A. from Princeton University in 1941. At Princeton, Parkhurst heard lectures by scholars such as Erwin Panofsky, Charles Rufus Marey, George Rawley, and Albert M. Friend. He had a fellowship with Paul J. Sachs, a Byzantine expert, at Dumbarton Oaks, but never a superb linguist, Parkhurst felt that he was unqualified for this position and left to become a research assistant at the National Gallery of Art along with his fellow student Craig Hugh Smyth. For most of World War II, Parkhurst served in the Navy as a gunnery officer in the Mediterranean. In 1943, Franklin Roosevelt established an art recovery division, named the Roberts Commission after its chairman Justice Owen Roberts, to repatriate art stolen by the Nazis. Parkhurst was part of the art recovery group and became deputy chief of Monuments, Fines Arts, and Archives in Germany. Immediately after the War, Parkhurst was promoted to lieutenant and he served with around thirty others at the former national headquarters of the Nazi party in Munich. The group recovered more five million dollars' worth of artifacts and artworks. Though Parkhurst was made a Chevalier de la Légion d'honneur by the French Government in 1948, he had been discharged from the Navy for signing the Wiesbaden Manifesto.

== Working years ==
When Charles Parkhurst returned to the United States from the front, he found a job at the Albright Art gallery in Buffalo, now known as the Albright-Knox Art Gallery, as the assistant curator to Andrew Carnduff Ritchie who had served in Parkhurst’s infantry division. In 1949, he returned to Oberlin as the college’s chair of the Fine Arts Department and the director of the Allen Memorial Art Museum, where he succeeded Clarence Ward. In an interview, Parkhurst explained that at the Allen Memorial Art Museum, "we were collecting for elucidation and delight." At Oberlin, Parkhurst founded the Intermuseum Conservation Laboratory in 1952, which was originally located on the campus but has since moved to Cleveland. This institution was the nation’s first regional, non-profit art conservation center. Parkhurst was appointed the director of the Baltimore Museum of Art in 1962 and married Rima Zevin Julyan that same year. Succeeding long-time director Adelyn Dohme Breeskin, Parkhurst acknowledged, "So I succeeded Adelyn; didn’t replace her. She’s irreplaceable, she’s the queen of museum directors.” Nevertheless, he managed to build up the American decorative arts, painting, and furniture collections. During his tenure as director, a Conservation Department was established in the Museum, a new floor was added to the American Wing, the Wurtzburger Collection of modern sculpture was added to the collection, and several friends groups were put together. Parkhurst also assisted in establishing the Maryland State Arts Council and the Maryland Revolutionary War Bicentennial Commission. Parkhurst once commented that the “Baltimore Museum was one of the great unknown museums at the time.” During that same period, he was also elected president of the American Association of Museums in 1966 and developed an accreditation system for museums similar to the ones used by universities. In 1970, Parkhurst assumed the role as assistant director and chief curator of the National Gallery of Art. He proved to be instrumental in the construction phase of the Gallery’s East Building. He retired from this post in 1983 to teach and curate in the museums at Williams College and Smith College. After his second marriage also ended in divorce, he married Carol Clark in 1986. Charles Parkhurst died in his home in Massachusetts at the age of ninety-five.

== See also ==
- American Association of Museums
- Monuments, Fine Arts, and Archives program
- National Gallery of Art
- Williams College Museum of Art
