= Charles R. Sattgast =

American educator and military officer

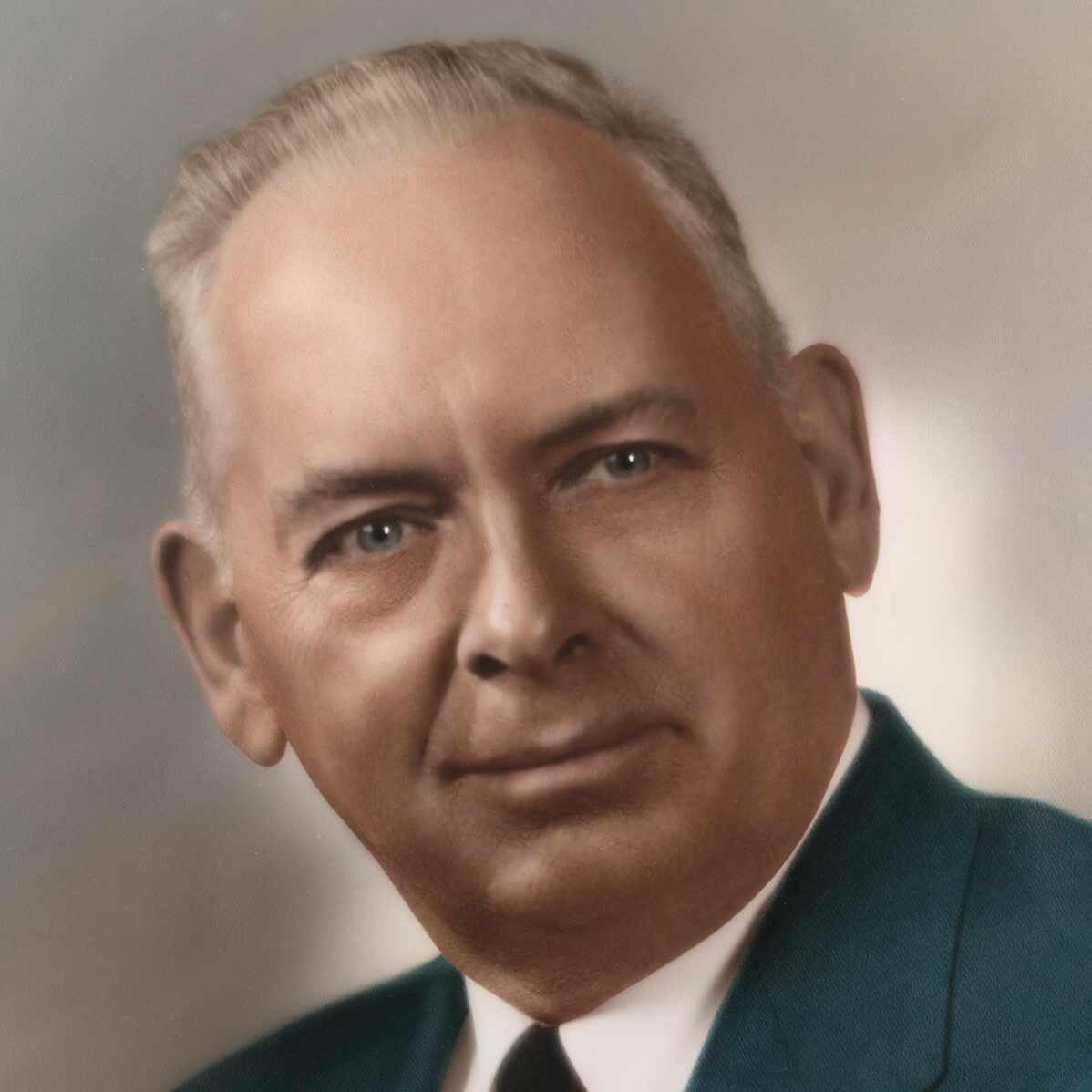
- Sattgast's Bemidji State President photo

President of Sioux Falls College
- In office 1930–1937

President of Bemidji State University
- In office 1938-1964

Personal details
- Born: Charles Richard Sattgast; January 26, 1899 Mount Vernon, Illinois
- Died: March 24, 1964 (aged 65) Rochester, Minnesota
- Resting place: Greenwood Cemetery; Bemidji, Minnesota, U.S.
- Spouse: Bertha G. Summers
- Children: 2
- Profession: Educator soldier

Military service
- Allegiance: United States of America
- Branch/service: United States Army
- Years of service: 1943-1946
- Rank: Major
- Unit: Monuments Men
- Battles/wars: World War II

Charles Richard Sattgast (January 26, 1899 – March 24, 1964), sometimes written as C.R. Sattgast, was an American educator and military officer who took part in the Monuments, Fine Arts, and Archives program (MFAA) or "Monuments men" during World War II. During the war Sattgast was responsible for inspecting the Schloss Fischhorn castle in Salzburg, Austria which led to the repatriation of multiple archival prints which were part of the Nazi plunder from the University of Warsaw, as well as the personal archives of Polish noblemen including Antoni Radziwiłł among others.

== Early life and education ==
Charles Richard Sattgast was born on January 26, 1899, in Mount Vernon, Illinois. Sattgast began his collegiate education at Southern Illinois University before transferring to the University of Illinois Urbana-Champaign where he received his bachelor's degree. Sattgast later studied at Stanford University where he received his master's degree, he later received his PhD from the Teachers College, Columbia University in New York in 1938.

== Career ==
Following his education Sattgast briefly taught in rural Illinois before accepting the position of superintendent of schools in Richfield, Kansas. Sattgast was later appointed as the president of Sioux Falls College in South Dakota from 1930 to 1937. Beginning in February 1938 Sattgast became the president of Bemidji State University in Minnesota (then called the Bemidji State Teachers College), which lasted much of his career from 1938 to 1964. During Sattgast's tenure as president of Bemidji State he oversaw a vast expansion of the university's degree programs in order to offer more liberal arts education programs and spearheaded the postgraduate education program. In addition to new programs, Sattgast also physically expanded the Bemidji State campus from its original 20 acres of land to 74 acres. This expansion the university allowed Sattgast to build new science, art, and industrial program buildings, as well as a new gym.

== Military service ==
During World War II 360 people from the Bemidji State student body and staff served in the war, among them was Sattgast who had took academic leave in 1943 from his duties at the university in order to serve in the United States Army. Sattgast would eventually be part of a group of 345 men called the Monuments, Fine Arts, and Archives program, or "Monument's Men" whose goals were to recover stolen artwork, artifacts, manuscripts, and archival documents from various collections, private institutions, collectors, and museums across Europe during the late war and the immediate postwar era.

During his time in the Army with the Monuments Men Sattgast was responsible for the recovery of five tons (roughly 11023.1 lbs or 4999.994054 kg) of historical documents which were being housed as the Schloss Fischhorn castle in Salzburg, Austria. The documents had been stolen from the Second Polish Republic as part of the broader Nazi plunder, primarily from the University of Warsaw, during the Invasion of Poland and the subsequent Occupation of Poland. Ac cording to the Monuments Men Foundation "nearly 80% of Polish libraries, museums, and scientific workshops had been destroyed, burned down, or looted during the war". Because of Sattgast's efforts to recover so many papers and Polish historical manuscripts the Polish Academy of Sciences awarded Sattgast an honorary lifetime membership as a fellow of the academy, the same honor had been given to the Polish-French nuclear scientist Marie Curie.

== Later life ==
Following World War II Sattgast returned to his position as the president of Bemidji State University in 1946. Sattgast would continue to work for Bemidji State until 1964 when he retired from his position as university president. Sattgast died on March 24, 1964, in Rochester, Minnesota. He is buried in Greenwood Cemetery in Bemidji.

== Legacy ==
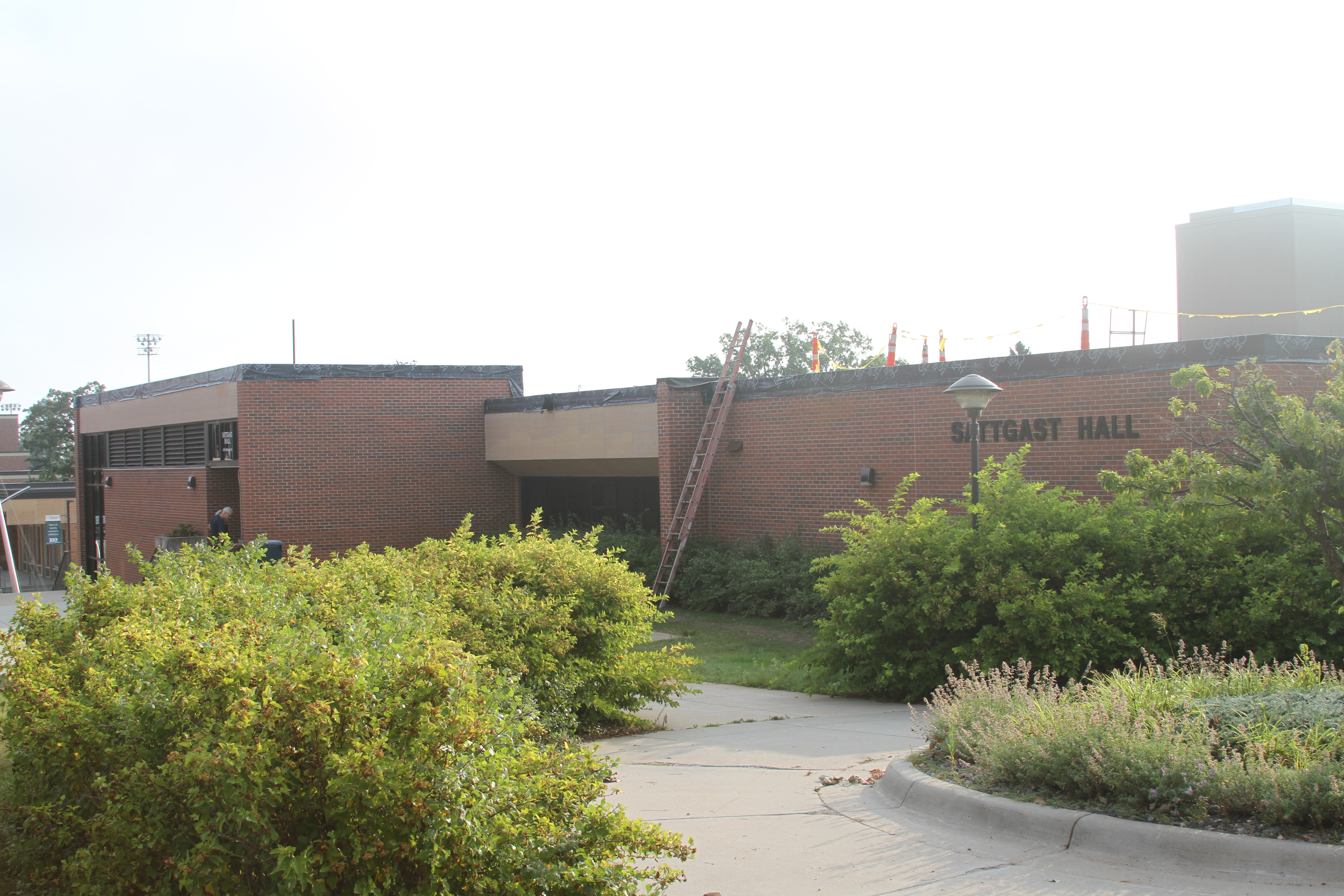
Sattgast Hall at Bemidji State University is named in honor of Sattgast who was the university's president from 1938 to 1964

Sattgast Hall located at Bemidji State University was named in honor of Sattgast in 1962. Sattgast Hall is the primary biology and science building on the Bemidji State campus.

== In popular culture ==
Although not depicted in the film, the 2014 American film The Monuments Men directed by George Clooney features many of the loosely portrayed real-life counterparts to actual Monuments Men of the Second World War, many of which Sattgast worked with such as George L. Stout, James Rorimer, and Ralph Warner Hammett.
