= Walter Farmer =

American historian

Walter Farmer (1911–1997) was a captain in the United States Army Corps of Engineers. He drafted the Wiesbaden manifesto, which resulted in the return of much of the artworks the US Army collected during World War II to their countries of origin.

== Biography ==
Walter Farmer was born in Alliance, Ohio, and received a bachelor's degrees in mathematics and architecture from Miami University in Oxford, Ohio. He went on to be active as a genealogist and was prominent in the museum field in Ohio and Texas. His marriages to both Josselyn Liszniewska and to Renate Hobirk ended in divorce. Farmer died of cancer on 11 August 1997 at the age of 86 at Christ Hospital in Cincinnati. He had a daughter, Margaret Farmer Planton; two grandsons; and a sister, Evelyn Krickbaum.

== Monuments, Fine Arts, and Archives program ==
As part of the Monuments, Fine Arts, and Archives program, Farmer was put in charge of the Wiesbaden art collection point at the end of World War II. The collection points were Allied locations where artwork and cultural artifacts that the Nazi regime had confiscated and hidden throughout Germany and Austria were processed, photographed, and redistributed. In 1996, the German government honored Farmer with the crimson Commander's Cross of the Federal Order of Merit.
