= Andrew Ritchie (art historian) =

Museum director (1907–1978)

Andrew Carnduff Ritchie (1907–1978) was a Scottish-born American art historian specialising in British 18th-century sculpture, a professor, museum director and post-World War II 'Monuments Man'. He was the director of the Albright-Knox Art Gallery in Buffalo, N.Y., director of Painting and Sculpture at the Museum of Modern Art, and director of the Yale University Art Gallery.

== Early life and education ==
Andrew Carnduff Ritchie was born in Bellshill in Scotland in 1907. In 1922 he moved with his family to Pittsburgh. At 17 he took a job at Westinghouse Electric in Pittsburgh in order to fund his higher education. He entered the University of Pittsburgh in 1927, graduating with an MFA degree in medieval studies in 1933.

He then obtained a fellowship to study at the Courtauld Institute of Art, University of London from 1933, graduating with a PhD in 1935. His dissertation topic was English medieval art. While at the Courtauld Andrew Ritchie contributed photographs to the Conway Library whose archive is currently being digitised as part of the Courtauld Connects project.

== Career ==
Returning from England in 1935 he began work as a research assistant and lecturer at the Frick Collection in New York. He also lectured at New York University and Johns Hopkins University.

In 1942 Ritchie was appointed Director of the Albright Art Gallery in Buffalo. He helped organize the first two catalogues of the museum's collection: Catalogue of the Paintings and Sculpture in the Permanent Collection and Catalogue of Contemporary Paintings and Sculpture: The Room of Contemporary Art Collection

During his tenure at Albright he also organised courses for members of local military production plants and units, night classes at the Albright Art School and a series of concerts and dances.

In January 1949 he moved to New York to become the Director of the Department of Painting and Sculpture at the Museum of Modern Art.

In 1957 he left MoMA to head the Yale University Art Gallery. In the mid-1960s, when the art collector Paul Mellon was looking for a university to place his British art collection, Ritchie persuaded him to donate his collection, used as the basis for a new museum, the Yale Center for British Studies (now the Yale Center for British Art). Ritchie also commissioned Louis Kahn to design the museum's innovative building, Ritchie continued to expand the collection. In 1970 he became the first American to be given an honorary doctorate from the Royal College of Art, London.

He retired from Yale in 1971, and then spent a year as Robert Sterling Clark Professor of Art History at Williams College in Massachusetts.

Ritchie died in Sharon, Connecticut on August 12, 1978. The Yale Center for British Art and the Yale University Art Gallery jointly sponsor the annual Andrew C. Ritchie Lecture in memory of his achievements.

== Work with the 'Monuments Men' 1945–1946 ==
In 1945 Ritchie was selected by the Roberts Commission to serve in the Monuments and Fine Arts Section of the United States Army – known as the Monuments Men – as a representative of the Commanding General in Austria, a civilian with the rank of colonel. Between June 1945 and May 1946, he assisted in the repatriation of art stolen by the Nazis.

He went to Munich, the main collecting point for works of art that had been stolen by the Nazis and stored in salt mines in Austria. His role was to supervise the return of works of art to their original countries – France, Netherlands etc. There he dealt with representatives of the various countries who were claiming losses. He was helped in his task by the meticulous details the Nazis kept about the origin of each plundered art work down to the day it arrived at the salt mines and the number of the train that delivered it. These details helped him to establish the veracity of each claim. In addition, the art was very well conserved as the salt mines provided ideal storage with natural air conditioning and a steady temperature. Ritchie was responsible for personally delivering two important items: a self-portrait by Vermeer, and the Habsburg Treasure.

The Vermeer self-portrait, 'The Art of Painting'. Originally owned by the Austrian Czernin family, it was claimed that in 1940 Count Jaromir Czernin had to sell the painting to Hitler under duress in order to save the life of his family. However the Austrian state determined that as it had been sold, the family was not due restitution, and it belonged to the state. Ritchie travelled to Vienna by train with the painting to hand it over to the Kunsthistorisches Museum. He locked himself in a sleeping compartment with the picture and a splendid picnic of pheasant and Burgundy supplied by a French colleague. Subsequently, the ownership of the painting was disputed, and the Czernin family pressed for the painting to be returned to them, but the Austrian authorities decided in 2011 that the sale was not forced and that the Czernin family could not claim ownership.

In order to emphasise the separation of the Austrian state from Germany, Ritchie was tasked to return the whole Habsburg Treasure to Vienna. Hitler had taken this from Austria to Nuremberg to emphasise the unification of the old Habsburg empire. Having requested some railway carriages to transport them, it was found that the packing cases – particularly that containing the 13th century coronation cope were too big for the train so a C-47 plane was commandeered instead.

He was later honoured by France and the Netherlands for this work and received the Cross of the French Legion of Honour.

== Publications ==
- Types and Antitypes of the Passion in English Mediaeval art, 12th-13th Centuries. University of London (Courtauld Institute of Art) 1935.
- English Painters, Hogarth to Constable: Lectures Delivered April 9, 10, 11, 16, 17, 1940, at the Johns Hopkins University.
- Aristide Maillol, with an Introduction and Survey of the Artist's Work in American Collections. Buffalo, NY: Albright Art Gallery, 1945.
- Sculpture in the Twentieth Century. New York: Museum of Modern Art, 1952.
- The New Decade: 22 European Painters and Sculptors. New York: Museum of Modern Art, 1955.
- Masters of British Painting, 1800–1950 [from the collections of] the Museum of Modern Art, New York.
- German Art of the Twentieth Century, by Werner Haftmann, Alfred Hentzen [And] William S. Lieberman. Edited by Andrew Carnduff Ritchie.
