= Wiesbaden manifesto =

The Wiesbaden manifesto is a document written and signed by members of the Monuments, Fine Arts and Archives (MFAA) organization rejecting the plundering and removal of cultural items as spoils of war. The Allies created special commissions, such as the MFAA, to help protect famous European monuments from destruction, and after the war, to travel to territories previously occupied by the Germans to find Nazi art repositories. The allies found these plundered artworks in over 1,050 repositories in Germany and Austria at the end of World War II. The book The Safekeepers: Memoir of the Arts at the End of World War II by former Capt. Walter I. Farmer of the United States Army Corps of Engineers during World War II, chronicles the recovery of and restitution of discovered hidden loot of the Nazi plunder, that were stolen from museums, private collections and libraries and individual Jewish emigrants and death camp prisoners.

In summer 1945, Capt. Walter Farmer became the collecting point's first director. The first shipment of artworks arriving at Wiesbaden included cases of antiquities, Egyptian art, Islamic artifacts, and paintings from the Kaiser Friedrich Museum. The collecting point also received materials from the Reichsbank and Nazi looted Polish liturgical collections. At its height, Wiesbaden stored, identified, and restituted approximately 700,000 individual objects, including paintings and sculptures. The collecting point not only cataloged and restitututed items, but also kept them away from the Soviet Army and wartime reparations.

When his superiors ordered that he send to the U.S. 202 German-owned paintings in his custody, Capt. Farmer and 35 others who were in charge of the Wiesbaden collection point gathered to draw up what has become known as the Wiesbaden Manifesto on November 7, 1945, declaring "We wish to state that, from our own knowledge, no historical grievance will rankle so long or be the cause of so much justified bitterness as the removal for any reason of a part of the heritage of any nation even if that heritage may be interpreted as a prize of war." Among the co-signers was Lieutenant Charles Percy Parkhurst of the U.S. Navy.

After three years of debate, U.S. President Harry S. Truman ordered that the paintings be returned to Germany in 1948.

Farmer received the Order of Merit of the Federal Republic of Germany in 1996.
