= Patentable subject matter in the United States =

Patentable subject matter in the United States is governed by 35 U.S.C. 101. The current patentable subject matter practice in the U.S. is very different from the corresponding practices by WIPO/Patent Cooperation Treaty and by the European Patent Office, and it is considered to be broader in general.

The US Constitution gives the Congress broad powers to decide what types of inventions should be patentable and what should not be, as long as patenting of these inventions "promotes the Progress of Science". Uncontroversially, patenting of research tools, scientific discoveries and scientific theories is excluded, since it would inhibit rather than "promote the Progress of Science".

However, besides research tools etc. there is another (and more controversial) question of whether some patent claims can be too broad and may pre-empt all uses of a particular discovery. The Alice-Mayo test discussed below aims to address this issue.

Since the enactment of the subject matter requirement ca. 1970, the interpretation of the statute changed multiple times. Although Section 101 of Title 35 U.S.C. reads:

Whoever invents or discovers any new and useful process, machine, manufacture, or composition of matter, or any new and useful improvement thereof, may obtain a patent therefor, subject to the conditions and requirements of this title.

and, thus, does not say what is patent-eligible and what is not, US courts felt that some inventions should not be subjected to patent monopoly at all (supposedly because certain claims may be too broad and may pre-empt all uses of a particular discovery), and used U.S.C. 101 as an excuse to enforce their own believes (and not of the US Congress). To quote the SCOTUS in Myriad: "Without this exception, there would be considerable danger that the grant of patents would ‘tie up’ the use of such tools and thereby ‘inhibit future innovation premised upon them.’"

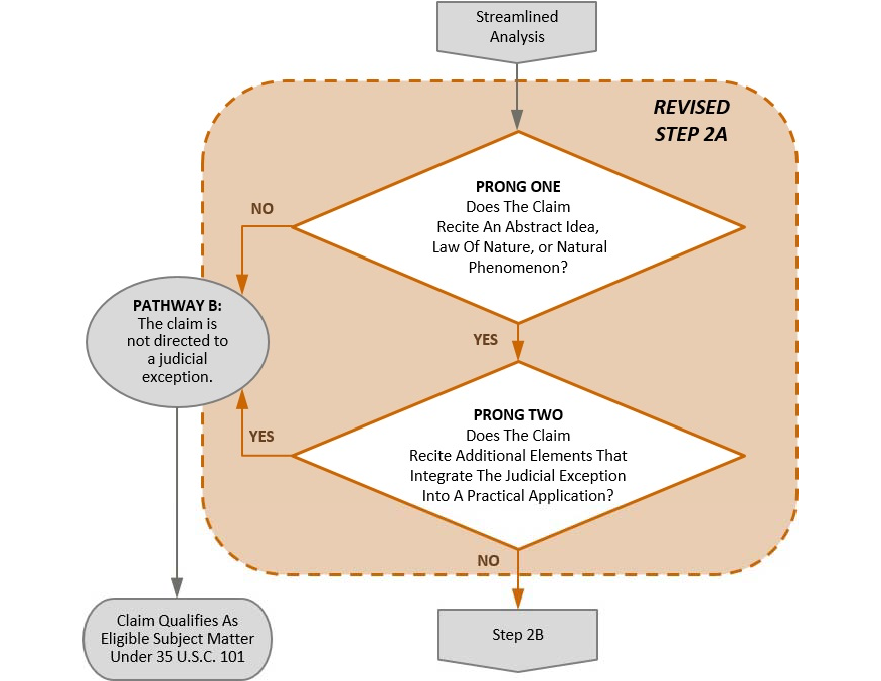
the two-prong patentable subject matter eligibility according to Alice-Mayo framework.

The two particularly contentious areas, with numerous reversals of prior legislative and judicial decisions, have been computer-based (see Software patents under United States patent law) and biological inventions. While these two areas present different types of challenges:

(a) the problem with biological inventions is where the discovery of Nature's work ends and where a human invention begins, i.e. patent monopoly should not encompass a "natural phenomenon or a law of nature".

(b) the problem with the software inventions (such as “mathematical algorithms, including those executed on a generic computer,... [and] some fundamental economic and conventional business practices") is that the scope of such claims is incommensurably broad compared to their contribution to "the Progress of Science" (quid pro quo),

the US Courts rejected early attempts to develop different set of rules for the two challenges and instead tried to find a common approach to these, as well to potential other subject matter eligibility challenges in the future. One amicus curiae plainly called this approach "one attempt [at] a universal framework via amorphous and misguided patent eligibility requirements."

Nevertheless, this approach, known as Alice- Mayo framework, was developed by the SCOTUS in 2012–2014, and has been used by the USPTO and by US courts since. The unified Alice-Mayo approach to subject matter eligibility requires (1) the newly discovered Law of Nature or mathematical formula to be assumed as known, (2) an additional "inventive concept", that limits the application of (1) to a specific and non-trivial use.

There is an important relationship between patent eligibility and non-obviousness tests in the US patent law. The non-obviousness criterion can be easily met, if a claim is based on a discovery of new natural phenomenon/principle/law. In the patentable subject matter analysis, however, this "discovery" is assumed to be prior art, and an "additional inventive concept" must be present in the claim.

Although the details are discussed below, the net result as of year 2023 can be summarized as follows:

Things (including living organisms and nucleic acids) found in nature are not patent-eligible (Funk Bros. Seed Co. v. Kalo Inoculant Co.) even, when isolated from their natural environment (e.g. a protein-encoding gene from a chromosome), but things (even alive) "made by man" may be (Diamond v. Chakrabarty, Association for Molecular Pathology v. Myriad Genetics, Inc.), provided that they are different in a useful manner from their natural predecessor(s).

In the case of computer-implemented methods, the algorithms (even new and non-obvious) per se are not patentable (Gottschalk v. Benson, Parker v. Flook), but their new and useful applications may be patentable (Diamond v. Diehr).

The Mayo, Myriad and Ariosa v. Sequenom patents are similar in being based on a "discovery" of a natural phenomenon or a mathematical law (as in Gottschalk v. Benson), that assures the novelty and non-obviousness of the patent claims. Yet, when this "discovery" is assumed to be a prior art (as the Mayo-Alice test requires), a patentable claim must have an additional "inventive concept" or "inventive application". The purpose of this requirement is to prevent monopolization of all (or many) uses of the "discovery". One legal commentator wrote, that the additional "inventive concept" requirement is reminiscent of the inventive step requirement of the Patent Cooperation Treaty and of European Patent Convention, and that some of US patent rejected due "subject matter eligibility" had their foreign counterparts rejected for the lack of inventive step.

== Historic development ==
The legislative and judicial history of the later is illustrated in the figure below:

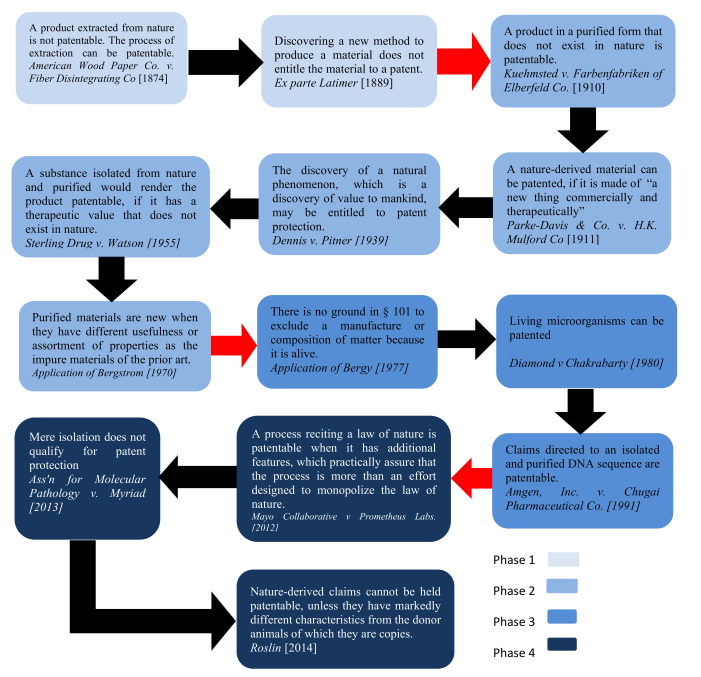
Evolution of the patent eligibility practice of nature-derived inventions in U.S. Patent System. Note: the red arrows demonstrate major policy shifts.

The subject-matter exception to patenting mathematical formulas and algorithms arose out of three Supreme Court cases commonly referred to as the "patent-eligibility trilogy" between 1972 and 1981: Gottschalk v. Benson, Parker v. Flook, and Diamond v. Diehr. These three cases can be share a common view, that when the only new element in a claim is a natural law/phenomenon or an abstract idea, the claim is patent-ineligible. As Nielson and Morse said, and Flook reaffirmed, the natural law/phenomenon must be treated as if it is a prior art. An additional "inventive implementation" is required in a claim to make patent-eligible.

=== 1852 Le Roy v. Tatham ===
This rarely cited case can be considered as the earliest example of patentable subject matter controversy decided by the SCOTUS. In this case the inventors discovered a new property of lead metal, which turned out be useful in making lead pipes. However, the claimed apparatus was essentially the same as old known lead pipe making machines. The 5-judge majority decided, that the patent essentially claimed the discovery per se, and invalidated the patent:

a principle is not patentable. A principle, in the abstract, is a fundamental truth; an original cause; a motive; these cannot be patented, as no one can claim in either of them an exclusive right.[15]

A 3-judge minority stated, that:

That the originality did not consist in the novelty of the machinery, but in bringing a newly discovered principle into practical application by which a useful article of manufacture is produced, and wrought pipe made, as distinguished from cast pipe.

[W]here a person discovers a principle or property of nature, or where he conceives of a new application of a well known principle or property of nature and also of some mode of carrying it out into practice so as to produce or attain a new and useful effect or result, he is entitled to protection against all other modes of carrying the same principle or property into practice for obtaining the same effect or result.

The minority held that "the invention in itself was not in discovering the abstract principle, which is open to all, but in applying the principle to a useful object." Similar judicial philosophy was adopted by Federal Circuit Judge Pauline Newman in Ariosa v. Sequenom, but this approach was firmly rejected by the SCOTUS in Mayo Collaborative Services v. Prometheus Laboratories, Inc. and it is not the controlling law in the USA.

=== 1853 O'Reilly v. Morse ===
In this case, Samuel Morse applied for a patent with a claim on "the use of the motive power of the electric or galvanic current, which I call electro-magnetism, however developed for marking or printing intelligible characters, signs, or letters, at any distances". While other more narrow claims were allowed, this broad claim was invalidated by, because such a broad claim would likely hinder rather than "promote the Progress of Science", as the patent clause of the US Constitution requires.

=== 1948 Funk Bros. Seed Co. v. Kalo Inoculant Co. ===
This SCOTUS decision is considered as the forebear of the "inventive application" requirement as a test for patent eligibility.

The patent in question claimed a combination of several bacterial strains, which help bean plants with nitrogen fixation. These different bacteria surprisingly did not inhibit each other, thus displaying a form of symbiosis instead. The problem with this "invention" was that it was not "made by man", but rather discovered in Nature. The majority opinion stated:

Even though it [the inoculum] may have been the product of skill, it certainly was not the product of invention. There is no way in which we could call it such unless we borrowed invention from the discovery of the natural principle itself. That is to say, there is no invention here unless the discovery that certain strains of the several species of these bacteria are noninhibitive and may thus be safely mixed is invention. But we cannot so hold without allowing a patent to issue on one of the ancient secrets of nature now disclosed. All that remains, therefore, are advantages of the mixed inoculants themselves. They are not enough.

=== 1972 Gottschalk v. Benson ===
The invention in this case was a method of programming a general-purpose digital computer using an algorithm to convert binary-coded decimal numbers into pure binary numbers. Although, the method was previously unknown and non-obvious, the Supreme Court found that the process in Benson was unpatentable since the invention, an algorithm, was no more than abstract mathematics. More generally, the Court noted that phenomena of nature, mental processes and abstract intellectual concepts were not patentable, since they were the basic tools of scientific and technological work. However, new and useful inventions derived from such discoveries are patentable.

Despite this holding, the Court emphasized that its decision did not preclude computer software from being patented, but rather precluded the patentability of software where the only useful characteristic was an algorithm. The Court further noted that validating this type of patent would foreclose all future use of the algorithm in question, which is undesirable from the public policy viewpoint and the constitutional requirement "to promote the progress of science". Therefore, like the traditional exceptions to patentable subject matter, the purpose of the algorithm exception was to encourage development of new technologies by not granting patents, that would preclude others from using abstract mathematical principles.

The US government and several legal scholars advised the Supreme Court to adopt machine-or-transformation test for subject matter eligibility, because it is fair and easy to apply. However, while writing, that machine or a transformation “is the clue to the patentability of a process claim," the SCOTUS declined to endorse exclusivity of this test.

=== 1978 Parker v. Flook ===
The invention in this case was a method of calculating alarm limits by using a "smoothing algorithm" to make the system responsive to trends but not momentary fluctuations in process variables (such as temperature). Because it was conceded that the implementation of the algorithm was conventional, the Court found that the inventor did not even purport to have invented anything on which a patent could be granted. The Court did so on the basis of the principle that the non-statutory subject matter (the algorithm) must be regarded as already in the prior art. Therefore, there was nothing left on which a patent could issue. In a case in which a patent was sought on an implementation of a principle (the algorithm), the implementation itself must be inventive for a patent to issue. Since that was not so, the Court held that the patent office had properly rejected Flook's claim to a patent. "The fact that the algorithm may not have actually been known previously and that, when taken in combination with other claim elements, it might produce an invention that is novel and nonobvious, plays no part in the analysis" of patentable subject matter.

Respondent's process is unpatentable under § 101, not because it contains a mathematical algorithm as one component, but because once that algorithm is assumed to be within the prior art, the application, considered as a whole, contains no patentable invention. Even though a phenomenon of nature or mathematical formula may be well known, an inventive application of the principle may be patented. Conversely, the discovery of such a phenomenon cannot support a patent unless there is some other inventive concept in its application.

The Court relied on the decision in Neilson v. Harford, an English case that the Supreme Court had relied upon in O'Reilly v. Morse, for the proposition that an idea or principle must be treated as if it were already in the prior art, irrespective of whether it was actually new or old. This approach is something like that of analytic dissection in computer-software copyright law, although its use in patent law preceded its use in copyright law by a century or more.

=== 1978–1982 Freeman-Walter-Abele Test ===
In these three cases the Federal Circuit attempted to develop a test for patentability of mathematical algorithms that complies with Gottschalk v. Benson. The use of this test was practically abandoned by 1994.

=== 1980 Diamond v. Chakrabarty ===
The United States Supreme Court ruled in Diamond v. Chakrabarty that a living non-naturally genetically modified bacterium is patent eligible under 35 U.S.C. § 101, which provides for the issuance of a patent to a person who invents or discovers "any" new and useful "manufacture" or "composition of matter." As a result of the ruling, the patented invention included claims drawn to a non-naturally occurring bacterium that was genetically modified to be capable of degrading hydrocarbons. This ruling set the precedent for animate material as patentable subject matter.

=== 1981 Diamond v. Diehr ===
In this case the United States Supreme Court backed away from the analytic dissection approach, and insisted that patent-eligibility must be decided on the basis of the claim (or invention) considered as a whole. The requirement of avoiding analytic dissection is found in the statute, but only for section 103 (governing obviousness or inventive step) and not for section 101 (governing patent-eligibility). Despite this difference in emphasis, however, Diehr can be harmonized with Flook and Benson, and the Diehr Court studiously avoided stating that Flook and Benson were overruled or limited.

=== 1998 State Street Bank v. Signature Financial Group ===
This decision established "useful, concrete and tangible result" as a patentability criterion. A price for a financial product was found as meeting this requirement. This decision historically was the first one, where patentability of business methods was allowed. However, this approach was invalidated in 2010 in Bilski v. Kappos.

=== 2004 Ex parte Lundgren ===
In Lundren, the applicant sought to patent a business method for evaluating and rewarding manager performance. Following an initial examination, the USPTO examiner rejected the applicant's claims, finding that they were not directed towards patent eligible subject matter. The applicant appealed this decision to the Board of Patent Appeals and Interferences, which subsequently held that process inventions do not have to be in the technological arts to be patentable in the United States. They do, however, have to produce a "concrete, useful and tangible result".

The USPTO was prompted to issue the guidelines by a 2005 decision by their board of appeals, Ex Parte Lundgren. This decision asserted that according to US judicial opinions, inventions do not have to be in the "technological arts" to satisfy the requirements of 35 U.S.C. § 101.

In October 2005, the United States Patent and Trademark Office (USPTO) issued interim guidelines for patent examiners to determine if a given claimed invention meets the statutory requirements of being a useful process, manufacture, composition of matter or machine (35 U.S.C. § 101). These guidelines assert that a process, including a process for doing business, must produce a concrete, useful and tangible result to be patentable. It does not matter whether the process is within the traditional technological arts or not. A price for a financial product, for example, is considered to be a concrete useful and tangible result (see State Street Bank v. Signature Financial Group of 1998).

The USPTO has reasserted its position that literary works, compositions of music, compilations of data, legal documents (such as insurance policies), and forms of energy (such as data packets transmitted over the Internet), are not considered "manufactures" and hence, by themselves, are not patentable. Nonetheless, the USPTO has requested comments from the public on this position.

=== 2007 In re Nuijten ===
In 2007 the Federal Circuit has ruled, in In re Nuijten, that signals (such as electromagnetic waves) are not statutory subject matter, because articles of manufacture (the only plausible category under 35 U.S.C. § 101) do not include intangible, incorporeal, transitory entities. A legal commentator explained the rationale in In re Nuijten as: "Because an inventor can patent both methods and devices for creating the signal, there is no need to patent the signal itself. Allowing the signal to be patented will only lead to abusive lawsuits against Internet Service Providers and other third parties, not to the {constitutional goal of} promotion of and advancement of science."

=== 2010 Bilski v. Kappos ===
In 2008 Federal Circuit en banc affirmed in In re Bilski the rejection of the patent claims involving a method of hedging risks in commodities trading. The court held that the "useful, concrete, and tangible" test for patent-eligibility of a process is incorrect, and that State Street Bank v. Signature Financial Group is no longer valid legal authority on this point. Instead, the Federal Circuit and the USPTO adopted the machine-or-transformation test for patentability of processes. Judge Pauline Newman wrote a short dissent in In Re Bilski, arguing for a broader definition of the patentability of processes. The US Supreme Court in its following cases (see below) essentially adopted the Newman's position.

On August 24, 2009, the USPTO issued new interim guidelines so that examination would comport with the Federal Circuit opinion.

On appeal in 2010, the United States Supreme Court confirmed in Bilski v. Kappos that Bernard Bilski's patent application for a method of hedging the seasonal risks of buying energy is an abstract idea and is therefore unpatentable. However, it also said that business methods are not inherently unpatentable, and was silent on the subject of software patents. The majority opinion also said that the Federal Circuit's "machine or transformation" test, while useful, is not an exclusive test for determining the patentability of a process. Instead, the Supreme Court reviewed the "Supreme Court Trilogy" described above and said that future decisions should be grounded in the examples and concepts expressed in those opinions. Contemporary commentators felt, that the decision left many questions unanswered, including the patentability of many medical diagnostic technologies and software.

=== 2012 Mayo Collaborative Services v. Prometheus Laboratories, Inc. ===
On March 20, 2012, the United States Supreme Court ruled in Mayo Collaborative Services v. Prometheus Laboratories, Inc. that a process patent, which Prometheus Laboratories had obtained for correlations between blood test results and patient health in determining an appropriate dosage of a specific medication for the patient, is not eligible for a patent because the correlation is a law of nature. The court reasoned "the steps in the claimed processes (aside from the natural laws themselves) involve well-understood, routine, conventional activity previously engaged in by researchers in the field." Some legal analysts criticized this decision for conflating two separate patent law concepts (patent eligibility under Section 101 and obviousness for patentability under Section 103), and potentially invalidating many patents relating to the biotech, medical diagnostics and pharmaceutical industries. Others, such as the American Medical Association (AMA), praised the decision for invalidating patents that would have hampered the ability of physicians to provide quality patient care. Under Section 287(c) of the Patent Act, however, a claim of patent infringement cannot be maintained against a medical practitioner for performing a medical activity, or against a related health care entity with respect to such medical activity, unless the medical practitioner is working in a clinical diagnostic laboratory.

=== 2013 Association for Molecular Pathology v. Myriad Genetics, Inc. ===
In March 2010, a federal district court judge in the Southern District of New York ruled against Myriad Genetics and in favor of the American Civil Liberties Union that purified DNA sequences and the inventions using them are unpatentable. As has been discussed, Judge Sweet relied entirely upon Supreme Court precedent and ignored contrary case law of the Federal Circuit Court of Appeals to conclude that isolated DNA is of the same fundamental quality as natural DNA and is thus unpatentable under section 101 of the Patent Act; and that the method claims of the patents were abstract mental processes that were also unpatentable. His rationale was controversial and his ruling was appealed to the Federal Circuit. The appeal court reversed the ruling deciding that isolated DNA had a "markedly different chemical structure" from other human genetic material.

On June 13, 2013, in Association for Molecular Pathology v. Myriad Genetics the US Supreme Court partly reversed the decision again deciding, that isolated DNA even after removal of introns was not patentable. Justice Antonin Scalia wrote "the portion of the DNA isolated from its natural state sought to be patented is identical to that portion of the DNA in its natural state". The Court held, that patent claims directed to a naturally occurring DNA sequence used for detecting a patient's genetic propensity of contracting breast cancer were not patentable subject matter (even when isolated from the surrounding DNA material and with introns removed). However, the Supreme Court also decided, that cDNA is patent eligible because "it is not naturally occurring." These patents were further litigated in University of Utah Research Foundation v. Ambry Genetics Corp. When the news was announced ACLU welcomed the decision and Myriad Genetics share prices rose.

In October 2015, the High Court of Australia ruled against Myriad Genetics, holding that a mutated gene associated with susceptibility to breast cancer cannot give rise to a patentable invention under Australian law.

=== 2014 In re Roslin Institute (Edinburgh) ===
The USPTO rejected claims on a cloned sheep, because the clone "did not possess markedly different characteristics than any found in nature." On the other hand, a patent on the method on cloning a eucaryotic organism was allowed.

=== 2014 Alice Corp. v. CLS Bank International ===
In May 2013, the Federal Circuit handed down an en banc decision in CLS Bank v. Alice applying the various concepts in the "Supreme Court Trilogy". The claims at issue were found unpatentable by a narrow margin, but the differences in positions of the various judges on the panel were dramatic and not definitive. On review in 2014 the Supreme Court reduced the patent-eligibility of software patents or patents on software for business methods, excluding abstract ideas from the list of eligible subject matters. After much confusion within the patent examiners and patent practitioners, the USPTO prepared a list of examples of software patent claims that are deemed patent-eligible or not.

=== 2015 Ariosa v. Sequenom ===
Subsequently Federal Circuit court applied the Mayo v. Prometheus test to invalidate as patent-ineligible a patent said to "solve ... a very practical problem accessing fetal DNA without creating a major health risk for the unborn child." The rationale for denying patent-eligibility in this case allegedly stems from claims being directed toward non-eligible subject matter (Law of Nature), "if the APPLICATION [of this discovery] merely relies upon elements already known in the art." Judge Pauline Newman was the only dissenter in Ariosa v. Sequenom. She criticized the Federal Circuit's position on patent-eligible subject matter (claims preempting the use of the laws of nature), following the SCOTUS decision in Mayo Collaborative Services v. Prometheus Laboratories, Inc.. Instead of requiring additional "inventive concepts" to transform a newly discovered law of nature into a patentable claim) Newman maintains, that claims limited to a small number of routine applications of new discoveries should be allowed, because such claims do not "preempt further study of this science, nor the development of additional applications". In her opinion "the major defect is not the claims lack inventive concept but rather they are overbroad." Thus, the judge suggested narrowing a claim to cover an application actually reduced to practice.

=== 2016 Genetic Technologies Ltd. v. Merial L.L.C. ===
This case involved a patent, where the inventor discovered, that noncoding segments in an individual's genome are correlated with specific allelic sequences found adjacent to, or remote from, the noncoding sequences. By amplifying a selected intron region of the DNA and analyzing its sequence, patient's haplotype can be established and used for diagnosis.

To quote the Federal Circuit:

The first claimed step of ‘‘amplifying’’ genomic DNA with a primer pair was indisputably well known, routine, and conventional in the field of molecular biology as of 1989, when the first precursor application to the ’179 patent was filed. ...The second physical implementation step, ‘‘analyzing’’ amplified DNA to provide a user with information about the amplified DNA, including its sequence, was also clearly well known, routine, and conventional at the time the ’179 patent was filed..‘‘Applicant has not invented a new way to analyze genetic loci. Rather Applicant has found that when prior art techniques are applied to the noncoding sequences, the result can be more informative than analysis of the coding regions.’’.

=== Developments since 2019 ===
On May 22, 2019, in Washington D.C. a bipartisan, bicameral draft bill that would reform Section 101 of the Patent Act was released. It was proposed by the chair of the Senate Judiciary Subcommittee on Intellectual Property Senator Thom Tillis (R-NC) and its Ranking Member, Senator Chris Coons (D-DE). They were joined by the House of Representatives Ranking Member of the House Judiciary Committee, Hank Johnson (D-GA-4), the chairman of the House Judiciary Subcommittee on Intellectual Property and the Courts, and Representative Steve Stivers (R-OH-15) The proposal was released prior to a round-table the Senators and Representatives were holding the following day and intended to solicit feedback. Introduction of a bill has been delayed by lack of agreement among stakeholders such as the American Bar Association's IP law section, the IP Owner's Association, the American Intellectual Property Law Association and BIO.

The draft bill expands the scope of the patentable subject matter by abolishing the judicial exceptions. More specifically, the proposed sections read:

Section 100: (k) The term "useful" means any invention or discovery that provides specific and practical utility in any field of technology through human intervention.
Section 101: 
(a) Whoever invents or discovers any useful process, machine, manufacture, or composition of matter, or any useful improvement thereof, may obtain a patent therefor, subject to the conditions and requirements of this title. 
(b) Eligibility under this section shall be determined only while considering the claimed invention as a whole, without discounting or disregarding any claim limitation.
Section 112: (f) Functional Claim Elements— An element in a claim expressed as a specified function without the recital of structure, material, or acts in support thereof shall be construed to cover the corresponding structure, material, or acts described in the specification and equivalents thereof.
Additional Legislative Provisions: The provisions of section 101 shall be construed in favor of eligibility. No implicit or other judicially created exceptions to subject matter eligibility, including “abstract ideas,” “laws of nature,” or “natural phenomena,” shall be used to determine patent eligibility under section 101, and all cases establishing or interpreting those exceptions to eligibility are hereby abrogated.
The eligibility of a claimed invention under section 101 shall be determined  without regard to: the manner in which the claimed invention was made; whether individual limitations of a claim are well known, conventional or routine; the state of the art at the time of the invention; or any other considerations relating to sections 102, 103, or 112 of this title.

The Biden's administration has been very supportive of the US congressmen, who try to pass clear guidelines on patentable subject matter. For example, in 2022 the US Department of Justice submitted a brief to the SCOTUS in the case America Axle v. Neapco. The brief's main arguments are:

(1) in the last 50 years the US Supreme Court issued several decisions introducing a patent-eligibility requirement into USC 101, which have no basis in legislative acts;

(2) the Court of Appeals for the Federal Circuit is divided on the exceptions to patent eligibility and has not been able to develop workable standards;

(3) the Solicitor General asks for clarifications as to what is abstract and what is an inventive concept.

In June 2023, US senators Chris Coons (D-DE) and Thom Tillis (R-NC) jointly introduced a draft of the Patent Eligibility Restoration Act of 2023, which tries to eliminate most judicially created exceptions to U.S. patent eligibility law. This bill was not passed by the Congress in 2023.

As a result, all attempts to clear up the confusion around the Alice-Mayo framework about patentable subject matter in the US have failed so far.
