= Diamond v. Diehr =

- Supreme Court of the United States

Argued October 14, 1980 Decided March 3, 1981
- Full case name: Diamond, Commissioner of Patents and Trademarks v. Diehr, et al.
- Citations: 450 U.S. 175 (more) 101 S. Ct. 1048; 67 L. Ed. 2d 155; 1981 U.S. LEXIS 73; 49 U.S.L.W. 4194; 209 U.S.P.Q. (BNA) 1

Case history
- Prior: Certiorari granted, 445 U.S. 926

Holding
- A machine controlled by a computer program was patentable.

Court membership
- Chief Justice Warren E. Burger Associate Justices William J. Brennan Jr. · Potter Stewart; Byron White · Thurgood Marshall; Harry Blackmun · Lewis F. Powell Jr. William Rehnquist · John P. Stevens

Case opinions
- Majority: Rehnquist, joined by Burger, Stewart, White, Powell
- Dissent: Stevens, joined by Brennan, Marshall, Blackmun

Laws applied
- 35 U.S.C. § 101

Diamond v. Diehr, 450 U.S. 175 (1981), was a United States Supreme Court decision which held that controlling the execution of a physical process, by running a computer program did not preclude patentability of the invention as a whole. The high court reiterated its earlier holdings that mathematical formulas in the abstract could not be patented, but it held that the mere presence of a software element did not make an otherwise patent-eligible machine or process patent ineligible. Diehr was the third member of a trilogy of Supreme Court decisions on the patent-eligibility of computer software related inventions.

== Background ==
=== The problem and its solution ===
The patent application in question US05/602,463 was filed on behalf of inventors Diehr and Lutton in 1975. The application claimed a "[process] for molding raw, uncured synthetic rubber into cured precision products." The process of curing synthetic rubber depends on a number of factors including time, temperature and thickness of the mold. Using the Arrhenius equation

$k = A e^{{-E_a}/{RT}}$
which may be restated as ln(v) = CZ + x

it is possible to calculate when to open the press and to remove the cured, molded rubber. The problem was that there was, at the time the invention was made, no disclosed way to obtain an accurate measure of the temperature without opening the press. In the traditional method the temperature of the mold press, which was apparently set at a fixed temperature and was controlled by thermostat, fluctuated due to the opening and closing of the press.

The invention solved this problem by using embedded thermocouples to constantly check the temperature, and then feeding the measured values into a computer. The computer then used the Arrhenius equation to calculate when sufficient energy had been absorbed so that the molding machine should open the press.

=== The claims ===
Independent claim 1 of the allowed patent is representative. It provides:

1. A method of operating a rubber-molding press for precision molded compounds with the aid of a digital computer, comprising:

providing said computer with a data base for said press including at least, natural logarithm conversion data (ln), the activation energy constant (C) unique to each batch of said compound being molded, and a constant (x) dependent upon the geometry of the particular mold of the press,
initiating an interval timer in said computer upon the closure of the press for monitoring the elapsed time of said closure,
constantly determining the temperature (Z) of the mold at a location closely adjacent to the mold cavity in the press during molding,
constantly providing the computer with the temperature (Z),
repetitively calculating in the computer, at frequent intervals during each cure, the Arrhenius equation for reaction time during the cure, which is
ln(v)=CZ+x
where v is the total required cure time,
repetitively comparing in the computer at said frequent intervals during the cure each said calculation of the total required cure time calculated with the Arrhenius equation and said elapsed time, and
opening the press automatically when a said comparison indicates equivalence.

=== Proceedings before Office and CCPA ===
The patent examiner rejected this invention as unpatentable subject matter under 35 U.S.C. 101. He argued that the steps performed by the computer were unpatentable as a computer program under Gottschalk v. Benson. The Board of Patent Appeals and Interferences of the USPTO affirmed the rejection. The Court of Customs and Patent Appeals (CCPA), the predecessor to the current Court of Appeals for the Federal Circuit, reversed, noting that an otherwise patentable invention did not become unpatentable simply because a computer was involved.

The U.S. Supreme Court granted the petition for certiorari by the Commissioner of Patents and Trademarks to resolve this question.

== The Supreme Court's opinion ==
The Court repeated its earlier holding that mathematical formulas in the abstract are not eligible for patent protection. But it also held that a physical machine or process which makes use of a mathematical algorithm is different from an invention which claims the algorithm, as such, in the abstract. Thus, if the invention as a whole meets the requirements of patentability—that is, it involves "transforming or reducing an article to a different state or thing"—it is patent-eligible, even if it includes a software component.

The CCPA's reversal of the patent rejection was affirmed. But the Court carefully avoided overruling Benson or Flook. It did criticize the analytic methodology of Flook, however, by challenging its use of analytic dissection, which the Flook Court based on Neilson v. Harford. The Diehr Court cited the Senate Report and the CCPA Decision in In re Bergy, 596 F.2d 952, 961 (CCPA 1979) to hold that (a) claims must be considered "as a whole," just as they are for all other patentability determinations, without extracting a "gist" or "point of novelty" to be considered in isolation, and (b) section 101 governs the kind of subject matter that can be patented, while concerns for novelty and non-obviousness are considered separately under sections 102 and 103:

In determining the eligibility of respondents' claimed process for patent protection under § 101, their claims must be considered as a whole. It is inappropriate to dissect the claims into old and new elements and then to ignore the presence of the old elements in the analysis. This is particularly true in a process claim, because a new combination of steps in a process may be patentable even though all the constituents of the combination were well known and in common use before the combination was made. The "novelty" of any element or steps in a process, or even of the process itself, is of no relevance in determining whether the subject matter of a claim falls within the § 101 categories of possibly patentable subject matter.

It has been urged that novelty is an appropriate consideration under § 101. Presumably, this argument results from the language in § 101 referring to any “new and useful” process, machine, etc. Section 101, however, is a general statement of the type of subject matter that is eligible for patent protection “subject to the conditions and requirements of this title.” Specific conditions for patentability follow and § 102 covers in detail the conditions relating to novelty. The question therefore of whether a particular invention is novel is “wholly apart from whether the invention falls into a category of statutory subject matter.”

== The patent ==
The patent that issued after the decision was U.S. Patent 4,344,142, "Direct digital control of rubber molding presses." The patent includes 11 method claims, three of which are independent. All method claims relate to molding of physical articles. The only diagrams in the patent are flowcharts. There are no diagrams of machinery. As the dissenting opinion in Diehr noted, the patent specification "teaches nothing about the chemistry of the synthetic rubber-curing process, nothing about the raw materials to be used in curing synthetic rubber, nothing about the equipment to be used in the process, and nothing about the significance or effect of any process variable such as temperature, curing time, particular compositions of material, or mold configurations."

== Subsequent developments ==
For many years, it was believed that Diehr effectively overruled Flook, despite the majority opinion's avoiding any such statement.

In 2012, in Mayo v. Prometheus, the unanimous opinion of the Supreme Court interpreted Diehr so as to harmonize it with Flook. The Court "found the overall process patent eligible because of the way the additional steps of the process [besides the equation] integrated the equation into the process as a whole." The Court "nowhere suggested that all these steps, or at least the combination of those steps, were in context obvious, already in use, or purely conventional." "These other steps apparently added to the formula something that in terms of patent law’s objectives had significance—they transformed the process into an inventive application of the formula."

The Court interpreted Diehr slightly differently in Alice v. CLS Bank, another unanimous opinion, but without taking issue with the Mayo interpretation. The Alice Court said:

In Diehr, by contrast [with Flook], we held that a computer-implemented process for curing rubber was patent eligible, but not because it involved a computer. The claim employed a "well-known" mathematical equation, but it used that equation in a process designed to solve a technological problem in "conventional industry practice." The invention in Diehr used a "thermocouple" to record constant temperature measurements inside the rubber mold — something "the industry ha[d] not been able to obtain." The temperature measurements were then fed into a computer, which repeatedly recalculated the remaining cure time by using the mathematical equation. These additional steps, we recently explained, "transformed the process into an inventive application of the formula." Mayo, supra, at ___, 132 S.Ct., at 1299. In other words, the claims in Diehr were patent eligible because they improved an existing technological process, not because they were implemented on a computer.

These two opinions state the current Supreme Court interpretation of what the Diehr case holds.

== See also ==
- Gottschalk v. Benson, 409 U.S. 63 (1972).
- Parker v. Flook, 437 U.S. 584 (1978).
- Bilski v. Kappos, 561 U.S. 593 (2010).
