= Ariosa v. Sequenom =

2015 United States court case

- Court: United States Court of Appeals for the Federal Circuit
- Full case name: Ariosa Diagnostics, Inc v. Sequenom, Inc.
- Decided: June 12, 2015
- Citations: 788 F.3d 1371; 115 U.S.P.Q.2d 1152

Case history
- Prior history: 19 F. Supp. 3d 938 (N.D. Cal. 2013)
- Subsequent history: Rehearing en banc denied, 809 F.3d 1282 (Fed. Cir. 2015); certiorari denied (June 27, 2016)

Court membership
- Judges sitting: Jimmie V. Reyna, Richard Linn, Evan Wallach

Case opinions
- Majority: Reyna, joined by Linn, Wallach
- Concurrence: Linn
- Concurrence: Alan David Lourie (concurring in denial of rehearing en banc), joined by Kimberly Ann Moore
- Concurrence: Timothy B. Dyk (concurring in denial of rehearing en banc)
- Dissent: Pauline Newman (dissenting from denial of rehearing en banc)

Ariosa Diagnostics, Inc. v. Sequenom, Inc., 788 F.3d 1371 (Fed. Cir. 2015), is a controversial decision of the US Federal Circuit in which the court applied the Mayo v. Prometheus test to invalidate on the basis of subject matter eligibility a patent said to "solve ... a very practical problem accessing fetal DNA without creating a major health risk for the unborn child." The rationale for denying patent-eligibility in this case allegedly stems from claims being directed toward non-eligible subject matter (Law of Nature), "if the APPLICATION [of this discovery] merely relies upon elements already known in the art."

In December 2015, the Federal Circuit denied a motion for en banc rehearing, with several members of the court filing opinions urging Supreme Court review. On June 27, 2016, the Supreme Court of the United States denied Sequenom's petition for a writ of certiorari.

== Background ==
Sequenom is the exclusive licensee of U.S. Patent No. 6,258,540, which claims priority to GB9704444 filed on 4 March 1997 by Oxford University Innovation Ltd. The patent describes a method of using cell-free fetal DNA (cffDNA) circulating in maternal plasma (cell-free blood) to diagnose fetal abnormalities. Claim 1 is illustrative:

1. A method for detecting a paternally inherited nucleic acid of fetal origin performed on a maternal serum or plasma sample from a pregnant female, which method comprises:

amplifying a paternally inherited nucleic acid from the serum or plasma sample and
detecting the presence of a paternally inherited nucleic acid of fetal origin in the sample.

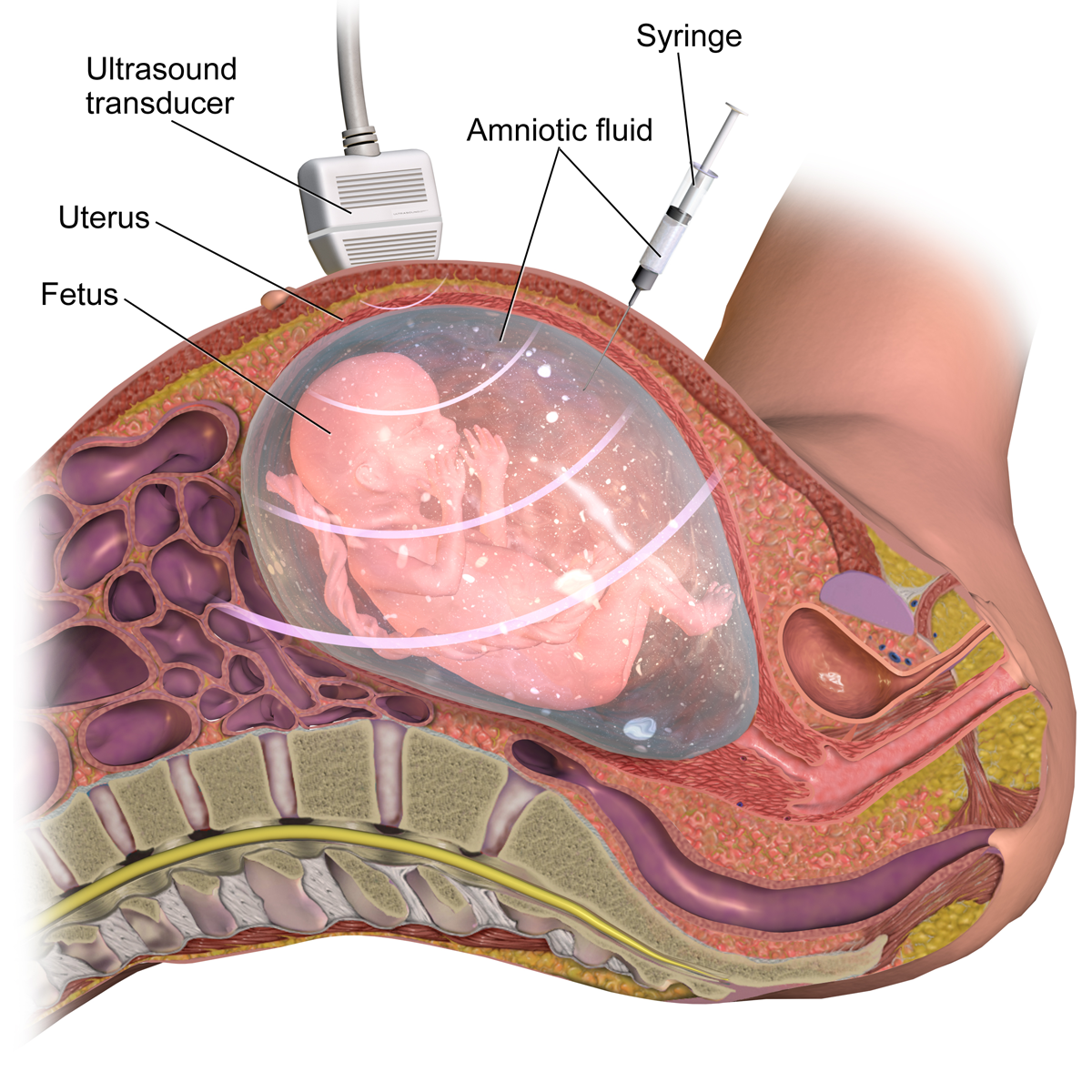
Amniocentesis

The invention is based on the 1996 discovery, that fetal DNA might be floating around in the mother's blood (not just in the blood of the fetus, which was accessible only by invasive methods, such as amniocentesis, which causes numerous risks for the unborn child). Based on this finding the inventors developed (using known methods) a process to selectively amplify the fetal DNA by focusing on the paternally inherited portion of its DNA (rather than the maternally inherited DNA).

The claim itself has two simple and conventional steps: first amplifying (by polymerase chain reaction, PCR) and then detecting the paternally inherited DNA from the plasma sample. The technology for amplifying and detecting DNA was already well known and generally used to detect DNA. There was a problem, however, of how to ascertain which DNA in the sample was that of the fetus and which was the mother's (which greatly outnumbered the fetal DNA in the sample).

The inventors realized that the fetus had DNA derived from the father as well as the mother, and that paternal DNA was not native to the mother's blood. So they wanted to focus on genetic fragments containing paternally inherited sequences the mother did not share, but had traveled from the fetal blood into the maternal blood through the placenta. The paternal DNA in the mother's plasma had to have come from the fetus. Then, they could reliably identify fetal DNA, which would in turn allow them to diagnose certain fetal genetic conditions. The inventors now had a test that did not require invasive and highly risky amniocentesis. Sequenom became the exclusive licensee of the patent.

After Sequenom launched its test on the market, several other companies began to market similar tests and cut prices. Sequenom sent letters to Ariosa Diagnostics, Inc., Natera, Inc. and Diagnostics Center, Inc.. threatening each of them with patent infringement suits. They responded by filing declaratory judgment actions against Sequenom.

After the district court construed the patent claims and denied a preliminary injunction, Sequenom took an interlocutory appeal. On remand to the district court, it held the patent invalid as claiming the only viable method of detecting a natural phenomenon. The district court said: "the claims at issue pose a substantial risk of preempting the natural phenomenon of paternally inherited cffDNA," which made them patent-ineligible. Sequenom then appealed to the Federal Circuit.

== Ruling of the Federal Circuit ==
=== Panel decision ===
A three-judge panel affirmed the judgment of the district court. The majority concluded that the patent fails the two-step test that the Supreme Court developed in Mayo for determining whether a method patent impermissibly claims a natural law or phenomenon.

First, the court said, the claims "are directed to a patent-ineligible concept" because the "method begins and ends with a natural phenomenon" (i.e., cffDNA). Second, it said, the claimed method did not "'transform' the claimed naturally occurring phenomenon into a patent-eligible application"of the phenomenon.

The court reasoned that, "[f]or process claims that encompass natural phenomen[a], the process steps . . . must be new and useful." But researchers already knew how to accomplish the individual steps of (1) fractionating blood; (2) amplifying DNA; and (3) detecting characteristics in amplified DNA. Therefore, the claimed method impermissibly added only "well-understood, routine, and conventional activity" to the natural phenomenon that the inventors had discovered. That made the claimed subject matter patent-ineligible as a matter of law according to Mayo v. Prometheus precedent.

The court said that it rejected Sequenom's argument that "implies that the inventive concept lies in the discovery of cffDNA in plasma or serum." That discovery is a natural phenomenon, rather than an inventive application of a natural phenomenon. This discovery helps to meet the non-obviousness requirement, but it does not address the patentable subject matter (i.e. additional inventive concept) requirement.

The court also rejected the argument that the patent did not preempt the entire use of cffDNA and that some uses were unpreempted. While total preemption "may signal patent ineligible subject matter," under Parker v. Flook and other cases "the absence of complete preemption does not demonstrate patent eligibility." The fact that once a court concludes that the claims involve only natural phenomena and "conventional" techniques, "preemption concerns are fully addressed and made moot."

Senior Judge Linn concurred separately, saying that he was "bound by the sweeping language of the test set out in Mayo." He explained also why he considered the Supreme Court's Mayo decision incorrect:

[T]he breadth of the second part of the test was unnecessary to the decision reached in Mayo. This case represents the consequence – perhaps unintended – of that broad language in excluding a meritorious invention from the patent protection it deserves and should have been entitled to retain.

Judge Pauline Newman was the only dissenter in Ariosa v. Sequenom. She criticized the Federal Circuit's position on patent-eligible subject matter (claims preempting the use of the laws of nature), following the SCOTUS decision in Mayo Collaborative Services v. Prometheus Laboratories, Inc.. Instead of inconsistent interpretation of patentable subject matter by different courts at different times (i.e. requiring additional "inventive concepts" to transform a newly discovered law of nature into a patentable claim) Newman maintains, that claims limited to a small number of routine applications of new discoveries should be allowed, because such claims do not "preempt further study of this science, nor the development of additional applications". In her opinion “the major defect is not the claims lack inventive concept but rather they are overbroad." Thus, the judge suggested narrowing a claim to cover an application actually reduced to practice.

Gene Quinn praised Judge Newman's position in this case, stating [her] "dissent in Ariosa would be a way forward for the Federal Circuit and would be in keeping with the admonition from the Supreme Court that 101 not be used to swallow all of patent law."

=== Denial of rehearing en banc ===
Sequenom sought rehearing en banc, but in December 2015 it was denied. However, several judges who concurred in the denial wrote separately that they disagreed with the sweep of the Supreme Court's Mayo decision that had compelled the result.

Judge Lourie, joined by Judge Moore, argued that Mayo read without qualification, would not only bar the present invention but would mean that "nothing in the physical universe would be patent-eligible," and thus it was "unsound to have a rule that takes inventions of this nature out of the realm of patent-eligibility on grounds that they only claim a natural phenomenon plus conventional steps." Nonetheless, he agreed that Mayo compelled invalidation of this patent.

Judge Dyk wrote that "a problem with Mayo insofar as it concludes that inventive concept cannot come from discovering something new in nature," especially in biological sciences, is undesirable. But he insisted that "any further guidance must come from the Supreme Court, not this court."

Nonetheless, Judge Dyk offered some speculation as to how the Supreme Court might modify Mayo to accommodate biotech inventions. He suggested the possibility of rule that would exclude trolls but would admit pioneer discoveries of natural laws to a limited extent. Dyk said, "The Mayo/Alice framework works well when the abstract idea or law of nature in question is well known and longstanding, as was the situation in Mayo itself." Yet. it may not be appropriate for discoveries of previously unknown laws of nature:

In my view, Mayo did not fully take into account the fact that an inventive concept can come not just from creative, unconventional application of a natural law, but also from the creativity and novelty of the discovery of the law itself. This is especially true in the life sciences, where development of useful new diagnostic and therapeutic methods is driven by investigation of complex biological systems. I worry that method claims that apply newly discovered natural laws and phenomena in somewhat conventional ways are screened out by the Mayo test.

Yet, "undue preemption" remains a major concern—"the fear that others' innovative future applications of the law will be foreclosed." He therefore proposes a special test for natural law cases, keeping in mind the patent ineligibility of E=mc^{2} and based on a requirement to keep speculator trolls out:

[I]f the breadth of the claim is sufficiently limited to a specific application of the new law of nature discovered by the patent applicant and [actually] reduced to practice, I think that the novelty of the discovery should be enough to supply the necessary inventive concept. My proposed approach would require that the claimed application be both narrow in scope and actually reduced to practice, not merely "constructively" reduced to practice by filing of a patent application replete with prophetic examples . . . [S]o long as a claim is narrowly tailored to what the patent applicant has actually invented and reduced to practice, there is limited risk of undue preemption of the underlying idea.

Dyk adds that he recognizes that the problem with the enablement and written description requirements of 35 U.S.C. § 112 is that they do not provide adequate limitations on claim scope. They "generally require only that one or a handful of representative embodiments be described" by the patent applicant, allow speculative prophesies, and thus do "not entirely prevent claims that preempt future applications of the law of nature by others," as he believes his proposal would. Finally, he said, Sequenom's claims would probably fail under the proposed test. because Sequenom claimed more than it taught: "any diagnosis of any disease, disorder, or condition. . . . impermissible attempts to capture the entire natural phenomenon of cffDNA rather than any particular applications thereof developed and actually reduced to practice by the inventors." Therefore, a future case would be a better vehicle for Supreme Court exposition of the limited, newly discovered natural law aspect of "the Mayo/Alice framework."

Judge Newman alone dissented; in her view the claimed methods were patent eligible even under Mayo because they represent "new applications" of knowledge and not a patent on the knowledge itself.

=== Certiorari petition ===
On March 21, 2016, Sequenom filed a certiorari petition. The petition raises one question only:

Whether a novel method is patent-eligible where:

(1) a researcher is the first to discover a natural phenomenon;
(2) that unique knowledge motivates him to apply a new combination of known techniques to that discovery; and
(3) he thereby achieves a previously impossible result without preempting other uses of the discovery?

On June 27, 2016, the Supreme Court of the United States denied the petition for a writ of certiorari.

== Commentary ==
Chris Holman wrote, that the Federal Circuit's opinion "is indeed very bad news for the patenting of diagnostic methods, and in the life sciences generally." Holman said that he hoped that "the Federal Circuit can find some way to rein in the unnecessarily expansive language of Mayo." But if the Federal Circuit is as constrained by Mayo as is believed perhaps only Congress can come to the rescue. Indeed, some members of the US Congress have been trying to pass a law, overturning Mayo decision, but it has not happened as of the end of 2023.

Kevin Noonan, a biotech blogger, considered the decision a "disaster." He blames the assertedly disastrous result on the Federal Circuit's failure to "consider the claim as a whole," instead of which he says it "has broken its analysis into pieces (contrary to Supreme Court's Diamond v. Diehr decision)." He also blames the Federal Circuit for relying on the Supreme Court's decision in Parker v. Flook, as to which he says: "The applicability of that decision on life science inventions should have been firmly put to bed in Judge Rich's In re Bergy decision.

Noonan's point about considering the whole apparently focuses on the fact that the named inventors were the first to discover the natural phenomenon that paternally derived fetal DNA passes into the maternal bloodstream and can be detected there. Although the discovery itself cannot be claimed, and the elements of the claimed diagnostic method applying the discovery are themselves well known in the art, Noonan believes that the meritoriousness of the discovery should be considered when deciding the patent eligibility of the diagnostic method. Noonan concedes that the type of analysis described in Flook "may make sense in claims to" electromechanical inventions such as that in Flook but not in regard to biotech inventions.

Noonan closes with a blast at the Federal Circuit for a lack of courage or will to use available "analytical and doctrinal tools" to instruct the Supreme Court on correcting its past errors, because "shielding the Court from the consequences of their bad decisions does them a disservice."

Devlin Hartline maintains:

[T]he panel's decision striking down Sequenom's noninvasive prenatal test strikes at the very heart of the patent system. Revolutionary diagnostic testing methods that cost tens of millions of dollars to produce should be the flagship of the modern patent system. But the panel's misapplication of Mayo calls into doubt many meritorious inventions that benefit us all.

Sue Nym, a pseudonymous biotech blogger, deplores the state of patent-eligibility jurisprudence: "Seemingly every new court decision addressing subject matter eligibility under 35 U.S.C. § 101 progressively weakens the patent system, especially in the life sciences. And each case seems to present a new low in terms of the depth and quality of analysis." She sees a common thread in these decisions, typified in Ariosa v. Sequenom – judicial hostility to patents:

Courts are striking down patents simply because the challenger has convinced the judge(s) . . . that the patents are bad, e.g., for patients, for large electronics companies supposedly pestered by trolls. . . . And patent challengers, empowered by convincing PR spin and misdirection about harm to patients, have found all too sympathetic judicial audiences. Courts these days are making policy-based decisions, untethered from any rule of law, aimed at killing patents they don't like.

Biotech blogger Courtenay Brinckerhoff considers Judge Dyk's proposals to allow claims to what is actually reduced to practice and no more hopeful prophesies. She questions whether patents limited to what inventors actually reduce to practice and disclose in their patent applications would "adequately promote the fundamental policies underlying the patent system," and she asks:

Would innovators find that scope of protection sufficient quid pro quo for disclosing their inventions in their patent applications? Would companies find that scope of protection sufficient to justify investment in research and development?

If not, she says, Dyk's test would just be too complicated and would discourage innovation.

Patent Publius, associated in an undisclosed manner with George Mason University Law School, asserts:

The overbreadth of the Federal Circuit's analysis threatens diagnostic methods across the board. If a method of detecting a natural phenomenon is always "directed to" that natural phenomenon, as the Federal Circuit suggests, then all such methods are prima facie patent ineligible under the first step of the Mayo framework and must fight the uphill battle under its second step. This is particularly troubling since virtually all diagnostic tests detect natural phenomena. Moreover, the Federal Circuit's application of the second step of the Mayo framework looks at each part of the method individually, ignoring the claimed method as a whole.

Publius complains further that the Federal Circuit fails to address Sequenom's central argument: "The claimed method is a new process of detecting cffDNA by devising a novel sample source from which to extract it, namely, maternal plasma or serum. The application and adaptation of known techniques in this inventive way to a newly-discovered sample source is not conventional."

He concludes with a warning of still worse things to come:

All told, the Federal Circuit's opinion in Ariosa v. Sequenom is a predictable, yet unfortunate, application of the Supreme Court's disastrous reasoning in Mayo. The unintended consequences of the Supreme Court's opinion have been further realized in the Federal Circuit's denial of Sequenom's innovative claimed method for diagnosing fetal abnormalities. Only time will tell how many other innovations will suffer under the Supreme Court's careless expansion of Section 101's patent eligibility analysis.

Jason Rantanan applauds Judge Dyk's concurring opinion on denial of rehearing. According to Professor Rantanon, the Dyk opinion "hits the nail on the head" by "framing the patent eligible subject matter issue as an issue of claim breadth." Rantanon agrees with Dyk that "Section 112(a) doesn't do an adequate job, by itself, of limiting claim breadth," so that it is necessary, as Dyk does, to "articulate a conceptually coherent approach to patentable subject matter in the context of discoveries of natural laws, one that allows for valid claims in this space but which still imposes limits on what can be claimed."

== Subsequent developments ==
A similar situation - a method for evaluating the patient's risk for a cardiovascular disease," which is "based on the discovery that patients with coronary artery disease (CAD) have significantly greater levels of leukocyte and blood myeloperoxidase (MPO) levels" was found to be non-patentable under Section 101 in Cleveland Clinic Foundation v. True Health Diagnostics LLC (Fed. Cir. 2019), because "the claims are directed to the patent-ineligible natural law, that blood MPO levels correlate with risk of atherosclerotic CVD... [T]he asserted claims ... recite no other inventive concept.

Another highly criticized case, where Mayo/Prometheus test was used to deny patent eligibility to a commercially significant invention of identifying organ transplant rejection based on detecting the donor's DNA in the recipient's blood, was 2023 CAFC decision in CareDx and Stanford University v. Eurofins Viracor, Inc. As in the previous cases, the Court cited the lack of further inventive concept beyond the newly discovered natural phenomenon.

In other words, a newly discovered law of nature can help the inventors to meet the non-obviousness requirement, but without an additional "inventive concept", that (1) limits the scope of claim, by preventing all uses of the discovered law; and (2) adds inventors' own creativity (not necessarily rising to the level of inventive step but rather at the level of substantial novelty) the requirement of Section 101 (MPEP 2106) is not met.

Surprisingly, in a related subsequent case Illumina, Inc. v. Ariosa Diagnostics, Inc.(2020 952 F.3d 1367), a divided CAFC sustained the validity of patent, where the claims were directed toward "methods for preparing a fraction of cell-free DNA, that is enriched in fetal DNA", which was based on the inventors discovery, that "the majority of circulatory extracellular fetal DNA has a relatively small size, approximately 500 base pairs or less, in contrast to longer circulatory extracellular maternal DNA in maternal plasma has a size greater than approximately 500 base pairs." The key to patentability, in the majority's opinion, was the resulting change in the composition of the blood plasma after separating long and short DNA fragments. Judge Jimmie V. Reyna wrote a strong dissent, pointing out that the differences between Ariosa v. Sequenom and Illumina v. Ariosa amount to nothing more, that claim drafting.
