= Consumer Watchdog v. Wisconsin Alumni Research Foundation =

Consumer Watchdog vs. Wisconsin Alumni Research Foundation is a case focusing on an appeal filed by Consumer Watchdog (CW) to invalidate a patent held by the Wisconsin Alumni Research Foundation (WARF) regarding the in vitro cell culture of human embryonic stem cells (hESCs). This case is still currently ongoing in the U.S. Court of Appeals for the Federal Circuit and is the latest in a series of attempts by CW to revoke one of the three patents held by WARF on hESCs.

== Background ==
On January 20, 1995, James Thomson filed an initial application for patent rights based on his pioneering work in isolating and maintaining long-lived culture of primate and human embryonic stem cells. As a result of this filing, the United States Patent and Trademark Office (USPTO) eventually issued three patents to Thomson, which were all later assigned to WARF: U.S. Patents Nos. 5,843,780 (December 1, 1998), 6,200,806 (March 13, 2001), and 7,029,913 (April 18, 2006). These patents are commonly referred to as the '780, '806, and '913 patents, respectively, and are all entitled "Primate Embryonic Stem Cells."

== Timeline of events ==
On July 18, 2006, CW (then known as the Foundation for Taxpayer and Consumer Rights) along with the Public Patent Foundation (PUBPAT) filed formal requests with the USPTO to revoke the '780, '806, and '913 patents on the grounds that the patents are overreaching and "significantly undermine research and waste taxpayer money". The main impetus for these appeals was that CW, which is a nonprofit advocacy group based in Santa Monica, California, claimed that the patent unfairly drove up the cost of research by requiring companies and academic institutions to pay a licensing fee for use of any human embryonic cell lines. Many believe that the timing of this appeal was a direct response to the increasing licensing costs paid by California taxpayers with the rise of state-funded stem cell research programs, specifically the California Institute for Regenerative Medicine (CIRM).

In October 2006, the USPTO granted the request for re-examination of all three patents due to "substantial new questions" regarding the validity of WARF's claims. In response to the re-examination proceedings, WARF eased their licensing restrictions by allowing academic researchers to now freely share WARF hESCs without incurring fees and removing the licensing requirements for companies funding research at universities and other nonprofit institutions.

On April 2, 2007, the USPTO released its decision to uphold the challenges for all three stem cell patents, agreeing with CW's original claim that Thomson's work was "obvious in light of previous scientific research." In response to the USPTO findings, WARF further narrowed their patent claims to only include stem cells derived from "pre-implantation embryos." This narrowed claim was eventually granted by USPTO in February and March 2008 for all three patents. Since the re-examinations of the '780 and '806 patents were both ex parte (in contrast to the re-examination of the '913 patent which was inter partes), this final decision on the '780 and '806 patents could not be appealed.

On July 18, 2008, CW and PUBPAT filed an appeal to the USPTO regarding the '913 patent. On May 3, 2010, the USPTO's Board of Appeals initially rejected WARF's '913 patent claims but then later reversed their decision due to a previous "flawed understanding of facts".

On July 2, 2013, CW filed an appeal with the U.S. Federal Circuit to overturn USPTO's decision to uphold the '913 patent. In this appeal, CW reiterated their previous arguments, that the work done was too similar to earlier research on mouse embryonic cells and applying it to human cells was an obvious next step to anyone skilled in the field. Furthermore, they referenced the June 2013 U.S. Supreme Court ruling in Association for Molecular Pathology v. Myriad Genetics that determined human genes can't be patented because they are a "product of nature." CW argued that hESC culture falls within this "product of nature" clause.

On January 17, 2014, the USPTO responded to a request by the Federal Circuit panel concerning CW's standing in this case. The USPTO argued that CW had no actual standing to appeal the USPTO's decision to uphold the patent as CW lacks any "concrete or particularized interest" in the issue at hand and failed to show any "injury or harm" to justify an appeal. As such, the USPTO concluded that the federal court has no judicial power to render judgment in this case because it does not satisfy the requirements for jurisdiction as specified by Article III of the U.S. Constitution.

On January 27, 2014, WARF filed a statement in support of USPTO's arguments. On the same day, CW responded to the USPTO's conclusions by re-asserting their standing even in the absence of specific injury by citing several court cases as precedent.

On June 4, 2014, the Federal Circuit dismissed CW's appeal.

In 2015 all 3 patents expired.

== Implications and future outlook ==
Ultimately, the impact of this case on hESC research remains hard to determine. There does not currently seem to be much concern in the scientific community regarding this case, with no real strong national push either for or against this appeal compared to other scientific issues. One of the most vocal supporters of this appeal has been Jeanne Loring, a prominent stem cell researcher at the Scripps Research Institute in La Jolla, California.

One possible reason for this apparent lack of concern within the scientific community is that WARF has eased its licensing fees and restrictions to such an extent that most don't find the overall cost of hESC lines exorbitantly high compared to other cell lines. Also, work on human embryonic stem cell research has been mitigated to a certain extent due to uncertainty about future federal funding and ongoing ethical concerns of such research. Moreover, with the recent discovery of induced pluripotent stem (iPS) cells, many scientists in the field have shifted towards iPS cells for precisely the reasons just stated. Finally, with all of the WARF patents due to expire in 2015, it seems unlikely that the resolution of this case, or any possible future litigation about the '913 patent in particular, will have a significant effect on hESC research.

Perhaps more significantly, the ruling of this case may set an important precedent on determining intellectual property rights for biological entities and the extent to which the term "product of nature" can be applied. The U.S. Supreme Court ruling in Association for Molecular Pathology v. Myriad Genetics established that "products of nature" such as human genes, despite the tremendous research efforts made to isolate them, cannot be patented. If the challenge to WARF's '913 patent were to succeed, this could lead to more widespread invalidation of other bio-related patents. From an economic standpoint, this could have broad implications in the biotechnology area by scaring away venture capitalists and other investors who may feel they don't have adequate protection for their investments, possibly resulting in an overall decline in innovation in the field.
