= Association for Molecular Pathology v. Myriad Genetics, Inc. =

- Supreme Court of the United States

Argued April 15, 2013 Decided June 13, 2013
- Full case name: Association for Molecular Pathology, et al. v. Myriad Genetics, Inc., et al.
- Docket no.: 12-398
- Citations: 569 U.S. 576 (more) 133 S. Ct. 2107; 186 L. Ed. 2d 124; 2013 U.S. LEXIS 4540; 81 USLW 4388; 106 U.S.P.Q.2d 1972; 13 Cal. Daily Op. Serv. 5951; 2013 Daily Journal D.A.R. 7484; 24 Fla. L. Weekly Fed. S 276

Case history
- Prior: The District Court for the Southern District of New York denied the USPTO's motion to dismiss, 669 F. Supp. 2d 365 (S.D.N.Y. 2009), and found that patents were ineligible, 702 F. Supp. 2d 181, 192–211 (S.D.N.Y. 2010). On appeal, the Federal Circuit reversed the decision and found 2–1 in favor of Myriad, 653 F.3d 1329 (Fed. Cir. 2011); vacated and remanded, 566 U.S. 902 (2012); 689 F.3d 1303 (Fed. Cir. 2012); cert. granted, 568 U.S. 1045 (2012).

Holding
- Naturally occurring DNA sequences, even when isolated from the body, cannot be patented, but artificially created DNA is patent eligible because it is not naturally occurring.

Court membership
- Chief Justice John Roberts Associate Justices Antonin Scalia · Anthony Kennedy; Clarence Thomas · Ruth Bader Ginsburg; Stephen Breyer · Samuel Alito; Sonia Sotomayor · Elena Kagan

Case opinions
- Majority: Thomas, joined by Roberts, Kennedy, Ginsburg, Breyer, Alito, Sotomayor, Kagan; Scalia (in part)
- Concurrence: Scalia (in part)

Laws applied
- U.S. Const. Article I, Section 8, Clause 8, 35 U.S.C. § 101

Association for Molecular Pathology v. Myriad Genetics, Inc., 569 U.S. 576 (2013), was a Supreme Court case, which decided that "a naturally occurring DNA segment is a product of nature and not patent eligible merely because it has been isolated." However, the Court allowed patenting of complementary DNA, which contains exactly the same protein-coding base pair sequence as the natural DNA, albeit with introns removed.

The lawsuit in question challenged the validity of gene patents in the United States, specifically questioning certain claims in issued patents owned or controlled by Myriad Genetics that cover isolated DNA sequences, methods to diagnose propensity to cancer by looking for mutated DNA sequences, and methods to identify drugs using isolated DNA sequences. Prior to the case, the U.S. Patent Office accepted patents on isolated DNA sequences as a composition of matter. Diagnostic claims were already under question through the Supreme Court's prior holdings in Bilski v. Kappos and Mayo v. Prometheus. Drug screening claims were not seriously questioned prior to this case.

Notably, the original lawsuit in this case was not filed by a patent owner against a patent infringer, but by a public interest group (American Civil Liberties Union) on behalf of 20 medical organizations, researchers, genetic counselors, and patients as a declaratory judgement.

The case was originally heard in Southern District Court of New York. The District Court ruled that none of the challenged claims were patent eligible. The majority opinion called patenting isolated or purified natural products a “lawyer's trick” to circumvent the prohibitions on the direct patenting of products of nature.

Myriad then appealed to the United States Court of Appeals for the Federal Circuit (CAFC). The Federal Circuit reversed the district court in part and affirmed in part, ruling that isolated DNA, which does not occur by itself in nature, can be patented, and that the drug screening claims were valid, but that Myriad's diagnostic claims were not patentable. The CAFC considered the valid gene claims as directed toward compositions of matter rather than toward information, like the District Court did.

On appeal, the Supreme Court vacated and remanded the case back to the Federal Circuit to reconsider the issues in light of Mayo v. Prometheus. On remand, the Federal Circuit held that Mayo v. Prometheus did not affect the outcome of the case, so the American Civil Liberties Union and the Public Patent Foundation filed a petition for certiorari. The Supreme Court granted certiorari and unanimously invalidated Myriad's claims to isolated genes. The Supreme Court held that merely isolating genes (even with introns removed), which are found in nature, does not make them patentable. However, the SCOTUS agreed with the "friend of the court" brief submitted by the USPTO, that complementary DNA should be patent eligible, because it does not exist in Nature but rather was "engineered by man", even though this decision lacks scientific consistency. A prominent US biotech patent lawyer commented on the SCOTUS decision: "It is inconsistent to conclude that isolated DNA and naturally occurring DNA are not markedly different because their information content is the same, and at the same time find that cDNA is patent eligible despite having virtually identical information content to naturally occurring mRNA."

This decision was not devastating for Myriad Genetics, since the Court only "invalidated five [of its 520] patent claims covering isolated naturally occurring DNA, ... thereby reducing [its] patent estate to 24 patents and 515 patent claims." Myriad continued suing its competitors. However, it was unable to get preliminary injunctions per eBay Inc. v. MercExchange, L.L.C., and most of these lawsuits were settled out of court.

== Background ==
The global search for a genetic basis for breast and ovarian cancer began in earnest in 1988. In 1990, at a meeting of the American Society of Human Genetics, a team of scientists led by Mary-Claire King, from the University of California, Berkeley announced the localization through linkage analysis of a gene associated with increased risk for breast cancer (BRCA1) to the long arm of chromosome 17. It was understood at the time that a test for these mutations would be a clinically important prognostic tool. Myriad Genetics was founded in 1994 as a startup company out of the University of Utah, by scientists involved in the hunt for the BRCA genes. In August 1994, Mark Skolnick, a founder of Myriad and scientist at University of Utah, and researchers at Myriad, along with colleagues at the University of Utah, the National Institutes of Health (NIH), and McGill University published the sequence of BRCA1, which they had isolated. In that same year, the first BRCA1 U.S. patent was filed by the University of Utah, National Institute of Environmental Health Sciences (NIEHS), and Myriad. Over the next year, Myriad, in collaboration with University of Utah, isolated and sequenced the BRCA2 gene, and the first BRCA2 patent was filed in the U.S. by the University of Utah and other institutions in 1995. In 1996, Myriad launched their BRACAnalysis product, which detects certain mutations in the BRCA1 and BRCA2 genes that put women at high risk for breast cancer and ovarian cancer.

Myriad's business model has been to exclusively offer diagnostic testing services for the BRCA genes. It was on the basis of the premium price that the patents would allow Myriad to set during the 20 year life of the patents, that investors put money into Myriad. These were the funds that allowed Myriad to rapidly sequence the BRCA2 gene and finalize a robust diagnostic test. The business model meant that Myriad would need to enforce its patents against competitors, which included diagnostic labs at universities, which function very much like for-profit businesses in addition to educating pathologists-in-training. The patents were to expire, starting in 2014. In 2012, Myriad—just a startup in 1994—employed about 1200 people, had revenue of around $500 million, and was a publicly traded company.

The USPTO patent examination guidelines in 2001, allowed patenting of DNA sequences:

Like other chemical compounds, DNA molecules are eligible for patents when isolated from their natural state and purified or when synthesized in a laboratory from chemical starting materials. A patent on a gene covers the isolated and purified gene but does not cover the gene as it occurs in nature.

About 2000 isolated human genes had been patented in the United States before this case started. Gene patents have generated a great deal of controversy, especially when their owners or licensees have aggressively enforced them to create exclusivity. Clinical pathologists have been especially concerned with gene patents, as their medical practice of offering clinical diagnostic services is subject to patent law, unlike the practices of other doctors which are exempt from patent law. For example, in 1998, the University of Pennsylvania's Genetic Diagnostic Laboratory received cease and desist letters on the basis of patent infringement from Myriad, which requested clinical pathologists to stop testing patient samples for BRCA. Because of these kinds of legal threats to its members' medical practices, the Association for Molecular Pathology has actively lobbied against the existence of, and exclusive licensing of, gene patents and was the lead plaintiff in this litigation.

=== Relevant case law precedents ===
Prior to Myriad the question of whether isolation or purification of a product of Nature from its natural environment is a patentable invention or a non-patentable discovery had a long history of contradictory judgements in the USA and elsewhere. In an 1889 case, ex parte Latimer, the inventor applied for a patent on fiber derived from Pinus australis tree. The Commissioner of Patents concluded that “alleged invention is unquestionably very valuable, it nonetheless was a natural product and can no more be the subject of a patent in its natural state when freed from its surroundings than wheat which has been cut by a reaper.” However, the Commissioner suggested, that “If applicant's process had another final step by which the fiber ... were changed, ... [it would probably be patentable] ... because the natural fiber ... would ... become something new and different from what it is in its natural state.” This statement is very important, because after over a century of turmoil, the US case law returned to exactly this idea.

However, soon after Latimer the US courts decided that molecules (which are claimed as composition of matter, unlike the natural fibers, which were claimed as articles of manufacture) were patentable, if the chemicals were "purified and isolated" from their natural environment(s). The "purified and isolated" doctrine was used to validate valuable patents on aspirin in 1910, on adrenaline in 1912, on vitamin B12 in 1958 and on prostaglandins in 1970. Although the SCOTUS invalidated in 1948 a patent on a naturally occurring mixture of bacterial strains (see Funk Bros. Seed Co. v. Kalo Inoculant Co.), US courts thought that "purified and isolated" doctrine still applied to molecules, and that Funk Bros. affected only living things.

The 1980 US Supreme Court decision in Diamond v. Chakrabarty opened a floodgate in patenting isolated genes, purified proteins, and cell lines. The practice of patenting isolated genes was affirmed in 1991 by the CAFC in Amgen v. Chugai Pharmaceutical. It is estimated that between 1980 and 2013 the USPTO allowed patent claims on up to 40,000 natural DNA sequences.

The SCOTUS had a chance to reverse Amgen in 2006, when it granted a writ of certiorari in LabCorp v. Metabolite, Inc.. However, the Court quickly dismissed the writ as improperly granted. Eventually, the practice of patenting "purified and isolated" products of nature came to an end in 2013, when the SCOTUS announced its decision in Association for Molecular Pathology v. Myriad Genetics.

=== Litigants ===
Along with the AMP (Association for Molecular Pathology) and the University of Pennsylvania, other plaintiffs in the suit included researchers at Columbia, NYU, Emory, and Yale, several patient advocacy groups, and several individual patients.

The defendants in the suit were originally Myriad, the trustees of the University of Utah, and the U.S. Patent and Trademark Office (USPTO), but the USPTO was severed from the case by the district court.

The American Civil Liberties Union (ACLU) and Public Patent Foundation represented the plaintiffs, with attorney Chris Hansen arguing the case. The law firm of Jones Day represented Myriad.

Proponents of the validity of these patents argued that recognizing such patents would encourage investment in biotechnology and promote innovation in genetic research by not keeping technology shrouded in secrecy. Opponents argued that these patents would stifle innovation by preventing others from conducting cancer research, would limit options for cancer patients in seeking genetic testing, and that the patents are not valid because they relate to genetic information that is not inventive, but is rather produced by nature.

=== Arguments ===
The complaint challenged specific claims on isolated genes, diagnostic methods, and methods to identify drug candidates, in seven of Myriad's 23 patents on BRCA1 and BRCA2.

The specific claims that were challenged were:

- claims 1, 2, 5, 6, 7, and 20 of U.S. patent 5,747,282;
- claims 1, 6, and 7 of U.S. patent 5,837,492;
- claim 1 of U.S. patent 5,693,473;
- claim 1 of U.S. patent 5,709,999;
- claim 1 of U.S. patent 5,710,001;
- claim 1 of U.S. patent 5,753,441; and
- claims 1 and 2 of U.S. patent 6,033,857

The plaintiffs wanted these claims declared invalid, arguing that they are not patentable subject matter under §101 of Title 35 of the United States Code—that the isolated genes are not patentable products of nature, that the diagnostic method claims are mere thought processes that do not yield any real world transformations, and that the drug screening claims were merely describing the basic processes of doing science. This part of U.S. law describes what is patent-eligible: "any new and useful process, machine, manufacture, or composition of matter, or any new and useful improvement thereof". If the invention falls under one of several excluding categories, however, including a "naturally occurring article" (a defined term in the law), then it is not patent eligible.

The Plaintiffs argued that Myriad's use of these patents—and the patents' very existence—restricted research for clinicians and limited scientific progress. They further argued that from a patient's perspective, Myriad's use of the patents not only made it impossible to obtain a second opinion on a patient's genetic predisposition to breast and ovarian cancer, but also kept the cost of BRCA1/2 testing high by preventing competition.

Myriad defended their patents, arguing that the USPTO issues patents for genes as "isolated sequences" in the same way it issues patents for any other chemical compound, since the isolation of the DNA sequence renders it different in character from that present in the human body. Myriad argued that their diagnostic tests were patentable subject matter.

== Decision of the District Court ==
On March 29, 2010, Judge Robert W. Sweet of the United States District Court for the Southern District of New York declared all of the contested claims invalid.

With respect to claims to isolated DNA sequences, Judge Sweet's 152 page decision stated: "DNA's existence in an 'isolated' form alters neither this fundamental quality of DNA as it exists in the body nor the information it encodes. Therefore, the patents at issue directed to 'isolated DNA' containing sequences found in nature are unsustainable as a matter of law and are deemed unpatentable under 35 U.S.C. §101." The decision also found that comparisons of DNA sequences involved in these patents are abstract mental processes under the Federal Circuit's In re Bilski decision, therefore also not patent eligible, and that the drug screening claims were unpatentable as they merely cover a "basic scientific principle".

On June 16, 2010, Myriad filed its Notice of Appeal.

== First hearing in the Court of Appeals for the Federal Circuit ==
Myriad's appeal was granted, and the case was heard in United States Court of Appeals for the Federal Circuit. Myriad, the defendant-appellant, was supported by at least 15 amicus briefs and the plaintiff-appellant's position received support from 12 amicus briefs. The Department of Justice provided a surprising and unsolicited brief that in part supported the appellants but also suggested that claims covering isolated naturally occurring human genetic sequences are not properly patentable. Oral arguments were held on April 4, 2011.

On July 29, 2011, the Federal Circuit overturned the district court's decision in part (reversing that an isolated DNA sequence is patent-ineligible, and the district court's decision that methods for screening cancer therapeutics is patent-ineligible) and affirmed its ruling in part (agreeing that the district court's decision that Myriad's claims for comparing DNA sequences are patent-ineligible). Judge Alan Lourie, who wrote the majority ruling, reasoned that isolated DNA is chemically distinct from the natural state of a gene in the body. Judge Lourie cited the Supreme Court case Diamond v. Chakrabarty, which used the test of whether a genetically modified organism was "markedly different" from those found in nature to rule that genetically modified organisms are patent eligible. Thus, he concluded that since Myriad's patents describe DNA sequences that do not alone exist in nature, they are patent eligible.

== First petition to the Supreme Court ==
After the Federal Circuit ruling, the Association for Molecular Pathology petitioned for a writ of certiorari to the Supreme Court, asking it to review this case. The Supreme Court granted the writ, and on March 26, 2012, it vacated the Federal Circuit decision, and remanded the case back to the Federal Circuit. In other words, the Supreme Court revoked the original ruling of the Federal Circuit, and directed the lower court to re-hear the entire case again. These Supreme Court actions were made in light of its recent decision in Mayo Collaborative Services v. Prometheus Laboratories, Inc., where the Court ruled that certain kinds of claims in medical diagnostics patents, including natural phenomena, were not patentable. The Supreme Court expected the Federal Circuit to take this precedent into account in its new ruling.

== Second hearing in the Court of Appeals for the Federal Circuit ==
On August 16, 2012, the Federal Circuit held its ground, ruling again in a 2–1 decision in favor of Myriad. The new court opinion was nearly identical to the original. The Federal Circuit again reversed the district court's decision on isolated DNA molecules; the Federal Circuit found that such molecules are patent-eligible under § 101 because they are nonnaturally occurring compositions of matter. It also reversed the district court's decision concerning assays to find drugs to treat cancer; the Federal Circuit again found that these assays are patentable. And again—now reinforced by the Mayo decision—the Federal Circuit affirmed the lower court's decision, that method claims directed to "comparing" or "analyzing" DNA sequences are patent ineligible. Such claims were held to include no transformative steps and therefore to cover only patent-ineligible abstract, mental steps.

With respect to the patentability of isolated genes, the majority opinion stated that the Mayo precedent was not particularly relevant to this case, because it did not deal with the patent eligibility of gene patents. Judge Lourie stated: "The remand of this case for reconsideration in light of Mayo might suggest, as Plaintiffs and certain amici state, that the composition claims are mere reflections of a law of nature. Respectfully, they are not, any more than any product of man reflects and is consistent with a law of nature."

Judge William Bryson wrote a dissent with respect to the non-patentability of isolated DNA sequences, applying the reasoning of the Supreme Court in the Mayo case, with respect to methods involving "natural laws", to products of nature:

In Mayo, which involved method claims…the [Supreme] Court found that the method was not directed to patent-eligible subject matter because it contributed nothing "inventive" to the law of nature that lay at the heart of the claimed invention…In concluding that the claims did not add "enough" to the natural laws, the Court was particularly persuaded by the fact that "the steps of the claimed processes…involve well-understood, routine, conventional activity previously engaged in by researchers in the field."

Just as a patent involving a law of nature must have an "inventive concept" that does "significantly more than simply describe…natural relations,"… a patent involving a product of nature should have an inventive concept that involves more than merely incidental changes to the naturally occurring product. In cases such as this one, in which the applicant claims a composition of matter that is nearly identical to a product of nature, it is appropriate to ask whether the applicant has done "enough" to distinguish his alleged invention from the similar product of nature. Has the applicant made an "inventive" contribution to the product of nature? Does the claimed composition involve more than "well-understood, routine, conventional" elements? Here, the answer to those questions is no.

Neither isolation of the naturally occurring material nor the resulting breaking of covalent bonds makes the claimed molecules patentable….The functional portion of the composition—the nucleotide sequence—remains identical to that of the naturally occurring gene.

== Second petition to the Supreme Court ==
On September 25, 2012, the American Civil Liberties Union and the Public Patent Foundation filed another petition for certiorari with the Supreme Court with respect to the second Federal Circuit Decision. On November 30, 2012, the Supreme Court agreed to hear the plaintiffs' appeal of the Federal Circuit's ruling.

Oral arguments were heard before the Supreme Court on April 15, 2013.

== Decision of the Supreme Court ==
Justice Clarence Thomas, on June 13, 2013, delivered the opinion of the Court, in which all other members of the Supreme Court joined, except Justice Antonin Scalia, who concurred in part and concurred in the judgment. The majority opinion delivered by Thomas held, "A naturally occurring DNA segment is a product of nature and not patent eligible merely because it has been isolated, but cDNA is patent eligible because it is not naturally occurring." In Part III of the majority opinion, Thomas wrote:

It is important to note what is not implicated by this decision. First, there are no method claims before this Court. Had Myriad created an innovative method of manipulating genes while searching for the BRCA1 and BRCA2 genes, it could possibly have sought a method patent. But the processes used by Myriad to isolate DNA at the time of Myriad's patents "were well understood, widely used, and fairly uniform insofar as any scientist engaged in the search for a gene would likely have utilized a similar approach," 702 F. Supp. 2d, at 202–203, and are not at issue in this case.

Similarly, this case does not involve patents on new applications of knowledge about the BRCA1 and BRCA2 genes. Judge Bryson aptly noted that, "[a]s the first party with knowledge of the [BRCA1 and BRCA2] sequences, Myriad was in an excellent position to claim applications of that knowledge. Many of its unchallenged claims are limited to such applications." 689 F. 3d, at 1349.

Nor do we consider the patentability of DNA in which the order of the naturally occurring nucleotides has been altered. Scientific alteration of the genetic code presents a different inquiry, and we express no opinion about the application of §101 to such endeavors. We merely hold that genes and the information they encode are not patent eligible under §101 simply because they have been isolated from the surrounding genetic material.

In his concurring opinion, which relates to the scientific details in the majority opinion, Scalia wrote:

I join the judgment of the Court, and all of its opinion except Part I–A and some portions of the rest of the opinion going into fine details of molecular biology. I am unable to affirm those details on my own knowledge or even my own belief. It suffices for me to affirm, having studied the opinions below and the expert briefs presented here, that the portion of DNA isolated from its natural state sought to be patented is identical to that portion of the DNA in its natural state; and that complementary DNA (cDNA) is a synthetic creation not normally present in nature.

== Reactions to the decision ==
Molecular Pathology v. Myriad Genetics was a landmark case on the practice of gene patenting. The District Court's decision was received as an unexpected ruling, because it contradicted the generally accepted practice of gene patents. The Federal Circuit's decision was a return to the status quo, in which the U.S. Patent Office issues patents for isolated gene sequences. However, it still ignited much controversy and interest from the public. The plaintiff's argument that DNA should be excluded from patent eligibility was widely echoed in popular media. Jim Dwyer, a reporter for The New York Times, wrote: "But for many people, it is impossible to understand how genes—the traits we inherit from our parents and pass along to our children—could become a company's intellectual property." James Watson, one of the discoverers of the structure of DNA, agreed and submitted a brief in the case. He argued that DNA conveys special genetic information, that human genetic information should not be the private property of anyone, and that developing a patent thicket of gene sequences could prevent easy commercialization of genetic diagnostics.

In terms of the emotional impact of this case as it was portrayed in the media—the exclusive offering of a diagnostic test and the high price of the test—the real legal force on that issue arose from the outcome of other cases, Bilski v. Kappos and Mayo v. Prometheus. These cases rendered most diagnostic claims unpatentable, making it difficult for Myriad's business model (as described above in the Background section) to work going forward—difficult for R&D driven business and investors and thus potentially bad for patients as there may be fewer diagnostic tests brought to market, but also potentially better for patients in that prices for tests may be lower and it will be easier to have a test re-done by an alternate lab.

The same issue, namely the patentability of the DNA sequence in the BRCA1 gene, was considered in a February 2013 case in the Federal Court of Australia where the validity of Myriad's patent was upheld. This was also a landmark ruling, and an appeal to the Full Court of the Federal Court of Australia was to be heard in August 2013. The submissions for that appeal were due on June 14, 2013, the day after the U.S. Supreme Court ruling was published, and the appellants in the Australian case stated that the U.S. ruling was referenced within their submission. In a unanimous decision in October 2015, the High Court of Australia, Australia's final court of appeal, concluded that an isolated nucleic acid, coding for a BRCA1 protein, with specific variations from the norm that are indicative of susceptibility to breast cancer and ovarian cancer was not a "patentable invention".
