= Pauline Newman =

American federal judge (born 1927)

- Newman in 2012

Judge of the United States Court of Appeals for the Federal Circuit
- Incumbent
- Assumed office February 28, 1984; Suspended: September 20, 2023 – present
- Appointed by: Ronald Reagan
- Preceded by: Philip Nichols Jr.

Personal details
- Born: June 20, 1927 (age 99) New York City, U.S.
- Education: Vassar College (AB); Columbia University (MA); Yale University (PhD); New York University (LLB)

Pauline Newman (born June 20, 1927) is an American lawyer and jurist formally serving as a U.S. circuit judge of the United States Court of Appeals for the Federal Circuit. As of 2025, she is the longest-serving active federal judge in the United States.

Newman was nominated to the United States Court of Appeals for the Federal Circuit by President Ronald Reagan in January 1984 and was confirmed by the U.S. Senate in February 1984. Ranking among the most distinguished federal judges, Newman has been called "the heroine of the patent system", "the Federal Circuit's most prolific dissenter", and "the greatest ally to inventors with respect to [calling out] the ignorance of the [Federal Circuit], district courts, and at times even the Supreme Court". Chief Judge Kimberly A. Moore commented of Newman that "many of her dissents have later gone on to become the law—either the en banc law from our court or spoken on high from the Supremes".

Due to allegations about her productivity and cognitive ability (which she disputes), Newman was suspended from her judicial duties in September 2023. She has filed a lawsuit challenging her suspension.

== Early life, education, and early career ==
Newman was born on June 20, 1927, in New York City, to Maxwell H. and Rosella G. Newman. Growing up during and in the aftermath of World War II, Newman "learned to fly planes, drive racecars and ride motorcycles". She received a Bachelor of Arts degree from Vassar College in 1947, with a double major in chemistry and philosophy, followed by a Master of Arts from Columbia University in 1948. She "sought to be a physician, but changed her mind", receiving a Doctor of Philosophy degree in chemistry from Yale University in 1952. At the time, it was unusual for women to work in chemistry, and "no chemical firm would hire her except American Cyanamid". As the sole female research scientist employed by that company, "her bosses tried to force her into becoming a librarian until she threatened to walk out". She worked as a research scientist for American Cyanamid from 1951 to 1954, during which time she was issued patents for "colorful, dirt-resistant synthetic fabric she helped invent". In 1954, she "took her savings and bought a ticket on a boat to Paris, where she supported herself by mixing drinks on the Île Saint-Louis" for six months, until her funds ran out.

Later in 1954, Newman returned to the United States and started working for FMC Corp., receiving a Bachelor of Laws from New York University School of Law in 1958, and working as a patent attorney and in-house counsel, and for fifteen years (1969–1984) as director of the Patent, Trademark and Licensing Department. From 1961 to 1962 Newman also worked for the United Nations Educational, Scientific and Cultural Organization (UNESCO) as a science policy specialist in the Department of Natural Resources. She served on the State Department Advisory Committee on International Intellectual Property from 1974 to 1984 and on the advisory committee to the Domestic Policy Review of Industrial Innovation from 1978 to 1979. From 1982 to 1984, she was Special Adviser to the United States Delegation to the Diplomatic Conference on the Revision of the Paris Convention for the Protection of Industrial Property. Over her career, Newman has received honors including the Wilbur Cross Medal of Yale University Graduate School, and the Award for Outstanding Contributions to International Cooperation from the Pacific Industrial Property Association. In 1982, while serving on a presidential committee on industrial stagnation for President Ronald Reagan, Newman helped create the United States Court of Appeals for the Federal Circuit. She has also been a "Distinguished Professor of Law" as an adjunct professor at the George Mason University School of Law.

== U.S. Court of Appeals for the Federal Circuit ==
On January 30, 1984, President Ronald Reagan nominated Newman to a seat on the United States Court of Appeals for the Federal Circuit vacated by Judge Philip Nichols Jr., who had assumed senior status on October 1, 1983. Newman was confirmed by the United States Senate on February 27, 1984, and received her commission the following day. Newman thus became the first judge appointed directly to the Federal Circuit, all of her predecessors having come to the court through the merger of the Court of Customs and Patent Appeals and the appellate division of the United States Court of Claims. Newman was also the only judge on the Federal Circuit who did not previously serve on a lower court.

Another judge of the Federal Circuit, Giles Rich, was the oldest active federal judge in the history of the United States when he died 10 days after his 95th birthday in 1999; Newman surpassed that record on June 30, 2022, but "remains an active judge" and has been described as "the court's institutional memory bank".

In 2013, Newman was honored by NYU Law Women as their law alumna of the year. In 2015, she endowed a lecture series on science, technology, and society, at her undergraduate alma mater, Vassar College, with the inaugural lecture being delivered on April 2, 2015, by Rensselaer Polytechnic Institute president Shirley Ann Jackson. That same year, Supreme Court Justice Ruth Bader Ginsburg praised Newman for inspiring women with "her intelligence, her diligence, her devotion to a very difficult area of the law".

A 2016 Law360 article stated that Newman "built her reputation as the appellate court's most prolific contrarian". A 2017 analysis of the impact of Newman's dissents has shown that her positions are often adopted by the Supreme Court of the United States on appeal. In 2018, she was selected to receive the American Inns of Court Lewis F. Powell, Jr., Award for Professionalism and Ethics. In October 2022, Newman endowed and initiated the Pauline Newman Program for Science, Technology and International Law at NYU Law. In remarks published in 2023, Federal Circuit Chief Judge Moore said that "there can be no doubt that Judge Newman is the heroine of the patent system".

In September 2023, Newman spoke at the National Vaccine Law Conference at George Washington University, advocating greater consideration of the effect of patent law on the advancement of technologies like vaccines, stating that "we must understand not just how the present law applies, but also to understand if it's anything less than optimum, it's in our hands".

In August 2026, Representative Darrell Issa, Chairman of the Subcommittee on Intellectual Property, Artificial Intelligence, and the Internet, introduced a bill in the United States Congress to designate courtroom 201 in the Federal Circuit's Howard T. Markey National Courts Building as the "Pauline Newman Courtroom".

=== Jurisprudence ===
Newman has written many important opinions about law of patents in the United States. In Arrhythmia Research Technology, Inc. v. Corazonix Corp., she wrote an opinion for the panel finding that the use of an algorithm as a step in a process did not render the process unpatentable. In In re Recreative Technologies Corp., she wrote the opinion finding that the Board of Patent Appeals and Interferences exceeded its authority when it considered a claim of obviousness in the reexamination of a patent previously held by the examiner not to be obvious with respect to the references cited. In Intergraph Corporation v. Intel Corporation, she highlighted the right of a patent owner to refuse to license, even to a party that has become completely dependent on the patent. In Jazz Photo Corp. v. United States International Trade Commission, she clarified the law of repair and reconstruction (permitting the owner of a patented item to fix the item when it breaks, but not to essentially build a new item from the parts of an old one), writing that it was not a patent infringement for one party to restore another party's patented "one-use" camera to be used a second time.

With respect to the court's federal contracts jurisprudence, in 2010 she wrote a dissenting opinion in M. Maropakis Carpentry, Inc. v. United States. Stanfield Johnson has called her the court's "great dissenter", and has said that her dissents in the area of federal contracts "consistently reflect the view that a primary responsibility of the court is to serve 'the national policy of fairness to contractors'". He writes:

At the core of Judge Newman's dissenting jurisprudence is the premise that the sovereign as a contracting party should be accountable for its actions, subject only to limited exceptions not to be presumed, unnecessarily expanded, or imposed in a formalistic doctrinaire way that ignores or masks the facts of government conduct. Where the facts justify it, contractors should be entitled to a 'fair and just' remedy, and the Federal Circuit is there to make sure this happens.

In Merck KGaA v. Integra Lifesciences I, Ltd. (2005), the Supreme Court modified a point of law by expressly adopting Judge Newman's position.

In 2015 Newman wrote a dissent in Ariosa v. Sequenom that criticized Federal Circuit's holding on patent-eligible subject matter (claims preempting the use of the laws of nature), following the Supreme Court's decision in Mayo Collaborative Services v. Prometheus Laboratories, Inc. Instead of inconsistent interpretation of patentable subject matter by different courts at different times (i.e. requiring additional "inventive concepts" to transform a newly discovered law of nature into a patentable claim), Newman maintains that claims, limited to a small number of routine applications of new discoveries should be allowed because such claims do not “preempt further study of this science, nor the development of additional applications". Gene Quinn and Nancy Braman, writing for IPWatchdog, praised Judge Newman's position in this case, stating that her "dissent in Ariosa would be a way forward for the Federal Circuit and would be in keeping with the admonition from the Supreme Court that §101 not be used to swallow all of patent law".

In April 2023, Newman wrote a dissent in SAS Institute Inc v. World Programming Ltd., asserting that the majority had conflated infringement and copyrightability questions and failed to enunciate the burden of proof.

=== Dispute over continued fitness to serve ===
==== Initiation ====
In April 2023, it was reported that Chief Judge Kimberly A. Moore had demanded an evaluation of whether then 95-year-old Newman could keep up with a case load expected for a Federal Circuit judge, noting Newman's excessively long times to submit judicial opinions. Some of Newman’s fellow judges in court orders have accused Newman of “paranoid” and “bizarre” behavior. In response to reports questioning Newman's competence, Mercer University professor David Hricik, writing for Patently-O, stated:

I saw Judge Newman (with Judge Lourie and former Judge O'Malley) speak at the USPTO three weeks ago. (I was there speaking on patent ethics.) Judge Newman was eloquent, coherent, cogent, and spoke passionately about various topics, including section 101 (which requires a bit of mental agility, I would say).

The initial report by Gene Quinn for IPWatchdog noted that "Newman has filed dissenting opinions in at least two recent cases that show no signs she is suffering from any disability", stating that these were "classic Newman dissents, do not read as if they were written by law clerks, and do not show signs of decline or disability". In June 2023, former Chief Judge Randall Rader stated in The Washington Post that he had spoken with Newman recently, and that she was "the same Polly I knew 10 or 20 years ago—as sharp as ever".

On April 14, the Federal Circuit Judicial Council released a statement and unsealed orders dated March 24, 2023, and April 13, 2023. The March 24, 2023, order stated that unnamed court staff and judges had raised concerns about potential impairments of Newman's cognitive abilities and other concerns.

Quinn questioned why Newman would have been offered an opportunity to assume senior status, and continue hearing cases in that status, if there were questions about her competence to hear cases at all. In a report for Bloomberg Law, professor Arthur Hellman of the University of Pittsburgh School of Law noted that senior status judges only hear cases "at the pleasure of the chief judge", and speculated that the prospect of getting no cases could explain why Newman would have rejected going to senior status. In an interview with The Washington Post, Newman explained her refusal to leave office, "It's important to the nation, if I can say so... I feel that I can make a contribution and must. That's what I was appointed to do".

==== Lawsuit ====
On May 10, Newman filed a lawsuit against Moore and others on the United States District Court for the District of Columbia, to prevent them from investigating whether she could continue to serve as a circuit judge of the court because of her health. The filing noted that Newman had been given "only a few days to comply with requests for mental evaluations and her private medical records". On May 16, the Federal Circuit ordered Newman to release her medical records to investigate her alleged cognitive decline. On May 18, in response to the controversy, the office of United States House Judiciary Committee chair Jim Jordan stated that "Judge Newman is an exemplary jurist who has long stood for the Constitution and earned every right to keep her seat on the bench and make decisions about her future herself."

On June 6, it was announced that Newman would not be assigned to hear new cases until the investigation is complete. At the same time, it was reported that the focus of the investigation had shifted from the judge's competency to her alleged failure to cooperate with the investigation by refusing to turn over medical records and submit to a neurological examination, a development referred to in a Law360 piece as "Kafkaesque".

On June 28, Bloomberg News reported that Newman's lawyers, with the New Civil Liberties Alliance (NCLA), had filed information with the court stating that Ted L. Rothstein, a neurologist and professor at the George Washington University School of Medicine & Health Sciences had "examined the judge and found 'no significant cognitive deficits'", concluding that her "cognitive function is sufficient to continue her participation in her court's proceedings". A Bloomberg reporter who sat with Newman for an hour-long interview for the story described Newman as "fully in command, answering questions about complicated legal matters with authority while shuffling large case binders around her office without assistance". In September 2023, Newman's NCLA lawyers released an additional report from forensic psychiatrist Regina Carney finding Newman to be an "unusually cognitively intact 96-year-old woman" with "no evidence of current substantial medical, psychiatric, or cognitive disability".

On July 11, Judge Christopher R. Cooper of the District Court for the District of Columbia issued an order requiring the parties to the dispute to enter into mediation, to be conducted by retired D.C. Circuit Judge Thomas B. Griffith. On August 4, 2023, a Federal Circuit panel, composed of Judges Moore, Sharon Prost, and Richard G. Taranto, recommended suspending Newman from hearing cases for one year over her alleged failure to cooperate with the investigation. Rothstein, the neurologist, criticized the court for misrepresenting his findings in the document recommending Newman's suspension. Judge Edith Jones of the Court of Appeals for the Fifth Circuit, in a letter subsequently published in The Wall Street Journal, described the refusal of the Federal Circuit to transfer the case to another circuit for review as "inexplicable".

==== Suspension ====
On September 20, 2023, Newman was suspended by the Federal Circuit's Judicial Council from hearing new cases for one year. The suspension is renewable, should Newman not comply with the Judicial Council's requests. Newman appealed on constitutional grounds, with Professor Hellman noting that "it is the functional equivalent of removing the judge from office". Following the suspension, former Chief Judge Rader published an open letter in IP Watchdog stating that Newman "does not suffer from the slightest mental decline", and imploring the members of the court to "act with kindness and consideration". Former Chief Judge Paul Redmond Michel also published such a letter, expressing concerns about the effect of these proceedings on "first, the integrity of the court; second, the interests of parties seeking justice at the Federal Circuit; and third, procedural fairness and balance".

On February 7, 2024, the United States Judicial Conference Committee on Judicial Conduct and Disability declined Newman's appeal to that body, and on February 12, the District Court dismissed six of the eleven counts brought in Newman's lawsuit, while allowing five to go forward. On September 6, 2024, the suspension was extended for another year, with the explanation that the suspension would be renewed if Newman continued to defy the court's orders.

In late August 2024, Newman received imaging (including a perfusion CT) and a neurological exam by a neurosurgeon who is also an attorney. A report of the findings dated September 17, 2024, stated that Newman possesses an "extraordinarily high level of cognitive ability" and deemed her "cognitively fit to return to active duty". In February 2025, however, three court-appointed physicians—a neuroradiologist, neuropsychiatrist and professor of neurology—criticized the findings and claimed that the neurosurgeon's use of perfusion CT scanning was against standard medical practice in assessing cognitive function. Orders were subsequently made for Newman to provide all her unredacted medical records due to the potential for medical conditions and/or medications to be contribution to her purported cognitive decline. The NCLA, however, responded that impeachment was the only remedy available to remove a federal judge. Newman appealed her suspension to the U.S. Court of Appeals for the District of Columbia. The judges reportedly expressed 'skepticism' that the suspension was unlawful or unconstitutional, but did express surprise that the complaint was not sent to another appellate circuit.

==== Supreme Court review ====
On March 12, 2026, the New Civil Liberties Alliance (NCLA) filed a petition for a writ of certiorari at the U.S. Supreme Court on behalf of Newman, which seeks to challenge the indefinite suspension of the 98-year-old judge, keeping her from the bench since late 2023. Newman argues that the Judicial Council of the Federal Circuit exceeded its legal authority with the indefinite suspension, which the petition characterizes as a functional removal from office without impeachment. The petition asks the Supreme Court to determine if the 1980 Judicial Conduct and Disability Act's ban on judicial review of Council orders applies to acts that exceed statutory authority, and if it prohibits courts from hearing claims for prospective relief against such actions. On June 15, 2026, the Supreme Court denied the petition, but on October 6, Chief Justice John Roberts issued an order transferring the case from the Federal Circuit to the United States Court of Appeals for the Eleventh Circuit, which will institute a new process for determining whether Newman should be allowed to continue serving on the bench.

==== Congressional action ====
In September 2026, Representative Scott Fitzgerald introduced a bill titled Judicial Conduct and Disability Reform Act of 2026, expressly prompted by concerns raised by Newman's suspension and her efforts to challenge the related proceedings. The bill would, among other changes, provide for transfer requests in misconduct proceedings involving circuit judges, establish recusal standards, permit limited judicial review of suspension orders, and generally limit suspensions to two years. Fitzgerald described Newman's case as demonstrating shortcomings in the existing Judicial Conduct and Disability Act.

== See also ==
- List of United States federal judges by longevity of service

Legal offices
Preceded by Philip Nichols Jr.	Judge of the United States Court of Appeals for the Federal Circuit; 1984–present	Incumbent
