= Parker v. Flook =

- Supreme Court of the United States

Argued April 25, 1978 Decided June 22, 1978
- Full case name: Parker, Acting Commissioner of Patents and Trademarks v. Flook
- Citations: 437 U.S. 584 (more) 98 S. Ct. 2522; 57 L. Ed. 2d 451; 1978 U.S. LEXIS 122; 198 U.S.P.Q. (BNA) 193

Case history
- Prior: In re Flook, 559 F.2d 21 (C.C.P.A. 1977); cert. granted, 434 U.S. 1033 (1978).
- Subsequent: Diamond v. Diehr, Diamond v. Chakrabarty

Holding
- A mathematical algorithm is not patentable if its application is not novel.

Court membership
- Chief Justice Warren E. Burger Associate Justices William J. Brennan Jr. · Potter Stewart; Byron White · Thurgood Marshall; Harry Blackmun · Lewis F. Powell Jr. William Rehnquist · John P. Stevens

Case opinions
- Majority: Stevens, joined by Brennan, White, Marshall, Blackmun, Powell
- Dissent: Stewart, joined by Burger, Rehnquist

Laws applied
- § 101 of the Patent Act

Parker v. Flook, 437 U.S. 584 (1978), was a 1978 United States Supreme Court decision that ruled that an invention that departs from the prior art only in its use of a mathematical algorithm is patent eligible only if there is some other "inventive concept in its application." The algorithm itself must be considered as if it were part of the prior art, and the claim must be considered as a whole. The exact quotation from the majority opinion is: "Respondent’s process is unpatentable under §101, not because it contains a mathematical algorithm as one component, but because once that algorithm is assumed to be within the prior art, the application, considered as a whole, contains no patentable invention." "The fact that the algorithm may not have actually been known previously and that, when taken in combination with other claim elements, it might produce an invention that is novel and nonobvious, plays no part in the analysis."

The case was argued on April 25, 1978 and was decided June 22, 1978. This case is the second member of the Supreme Court's patent-eligibility trilogy.

== Prior history ==
The case revolves around a patent application for a "Method for Updating Alarm Limits". These limits are numbers between which a catalytic converter is operating normally. The numbers are determined by taking a time-weighted average of values of a relevant operating parameter, such as temperature inside the reactor, in accordance with a smoothing algorithm. When the values of these numbers leave this range an alarm may be sounded. The claims, however, were directed to the numbers (the "alarm limits") themselves.

Flook's method was identical to previous systems except for the mathematical algorithm. In fact, although the patent examiner assumed that Flook had originated the mathematical technique, someone else had published it a number of years earlier. In Gottschalk v. Benson, the court had ruled that the discovery of a new formula is not patentable. This case differed from Benson by including a specific application—catalytic conversion of hydrocarbons—for the formula as a claim limitation (a so-called field of use limitation). The patent examiner rejected the patent application as "in practical effect" a claim to the formula or its mathematics. When the decision was appealed, the Board of Appeals of the Patent and Trademark Office sustained the examiner's rejection.

Next, the Court of Customs and Patent Appeals (CCPA) reversed the Board's decision, saying that the patent only claimed the right to the equation in the limited context of the catalytic chemical conversion of hydrocarbons, so that the patent would not wholly pre-empt the use of the algorithm. Finally, the Government, on behalf of the (Acting) Commissioner of Patents and Trademarks, filed a petition for a writ of certiorari to the CCPA in the Supreme Court.

== Supreme Court's decision ==
The law which is applicable to this case is section 101 of the Patent Act. If Flook's patent claim can meet the definition of a "process" under that law then it is patent-eligible (that is, it is the kind of thing that can receive a patent if it is also novel, unobvious, and the like). The Court decided that the patent claim under review was instead a claim to a "principle" or a "law of nature" and thus not patent-eligible. The Court relied on a line of cases following from the Neilson vs. Harford case. The principle of that case, as explained in O'Reilly v. Morse, is that that patent-eligibility must be analyzed on the basis of it being as if the principle, algorithm, or mathematical formula were already well known (was in the prior art). Flook's process is thus ineligible for a patent "because, once that algorithm is assumed to be within the prior art, the application, considered as a whole, contains no patentable invention." In a nutshell:

Even though a phenomenon of nature or mathematical formula may be well known, an inventive application of the principle may be patented. Conversely, the discovery of such a phenomenon cannot support a patent unless there is some other inventive concept in its application. [Emphasis supplied.]

The Court did not agree with Flook's assertion that the existence of a limitation to a specific field of use made the formula patent-eligible. The majority opinion said of this argument:

A competent draftsman could attach some form of post-solution activity to almost any mathematical formula; the Pythagorean theorem would not have been patentable, or partially patentable, because a patent application contained a final step indicating that the formula, when solved, could be usefully applied to existing surveying techniques.

The court moderated that assertion by agreeing that not all patent applications involving formulas are patent-ineligible by saying, "Yet it is equally clear that a process is not unpatentable simply because it contains a law of nature or a mathematical algorithm." Patents involving formulas, laws of nature, or abstract principles are eligible for patent protection if the implementation of the principle is novel and unobvious—unlike this case, in which it was conceded that the implementation was conventional. Accordingly, in Flook's case, there was no "other inventive concept in its application", and thus no eligibility for a patent.

== Criticism and response to Flook ==
In In re Bergy, a 1979 decision of the United States Court of Customs and Patent Appeals (C.C.P.A.), Judge Giles Rich extensively criticized Justice Stevens's Flook opinion. The Supreme Court had vacated an earlier Bergy opinion, with terse instructions that the CCPA should give the matter "further consideration in light of Parker v. Flook, 437 U.S. 584 (1978)." Judge Rich began by protesting that "[t]he Court gave no intimation of what bearing it thought Flook has on the single issue in these appeals [whether the claimed subject matter was patent-eligible], except as it may be gleaned from the Flook opinion." After an exhaustive analysis of what Flook, the Constitution, and the patent statute provide about the grant of patents—which said little or nothing about the patent-ineligibility of abstract ideas and how section 101 of the patent law relates to that—Judge Rich summarized his view: "To conclude on the light Flook sheds on these cases, very simply, for the reasons we have stated, we find none."

Before reaching his conclusion, however, Judge Rich condemned the Flook opinion as embodying:

an unfortunate and apparently unconscious, though clear, commingling of distinct statutory provisions which are conceptually unrelated, namely, those pertaining to the categories of inventions in § 101 which may be patentable and to the conditions for patentability demanded by the statute for inventions within the statutory categories, particularly the nonobviousness condition of § 103.

The reason for this confusion in the Court's opinion he attributed to "subversive nonsense" in the government's briefs for the Patent Office:

We have observed with regret that the briefs filed by the Solicitor General for Acting Commissioner Parker in Parker v. Flook, a case which, as the Court noted, "turns entirely on the proper construction of § 101," badly, and with a seeming sense of purpose, confuse the statutory-categories requirement of § 101 with a requirement for the existence of "invention." This they do by basing argument on the opening words of § 101, "Whoever invents or discovers," thereby importing into the discussion of compliance with § 101 a requirement for "invention" in a patentability sense.

To Judge Rich, even though section 101 says "whoever invents or discovers," there is no basis for importing into the analysis any inquiry into the nature of what it is that the patent applicants purports to have invented, and whether it is the kind of thing that can be patented as an invention. Thus, when the Flook Court says that Flook's process is not the kind of process that the patent law permits to be patented, even though it is a process in the ordinary dictionary sense of the word, Judge Rich finds the inquiry impermissible because "§ 101 was never intended to be a 'standard of patentability'; the standards, or conditions as the statute calls them, are in § 102 and § 103." The only legitimate question, he says, is whether the claimed subject matter is "new, useful, and unobvious."

Judge Rich could not agree that the implementation of a natural principle must be "inventive" rather than concededly conventional (as Flook had conceded). To him, that improperly mixed obviousness under section 103 up with statutory subject matter under section 101. But Judge Rich overlooked what Justice Stevens pointed out—that Flook did not purport to have implemented the process in anything but a conventional way and did not purport to have added anything to what was previously known but the use of the smoothing formula. Justice Stevens saw the case as one in which Flook did not even purport to have invented anything capable of being patented. (Justice Stevens responded to the Bergy critique in his dissenting opinion in the Diehr case.)

Actually, the concession by Flook made the Flook case an easy one. But one could hardly expect any applicant in a subsequent case to make a similar concession. It is unclear how to apply the principle of the Flook case to other cases where no such concession exists. In one class of case, where the implementation is utterly trivial on its face, as in Funk v. Kalo Inoculant Co., the applicability of the same principle seems clear. But that appears to be the outer limit of the easy case. Once reasonable persons can differ on whether the implementation is barely removed from the natural principle, it would seem that the Flook principle cannot be employed. If a full-scale Graham v. Deere analysis must be used to evaluate the implementation, it would seem that the case can no longer be disposed of on section 101 grounds. That is what appears to have happened in the next member of the trilogy, Diamond v. Diehr.

For many years commentators thought that Diehr overruled Flook or reduced it to innocuous desuetude. In Mayo v. Prometheus, however, the Supreme Court "rehabilitated" Flook and harmonized it, Diehr, and the other decisions of the Supreme Court as well as the 19th century English decision of Neilson v. Harford. The Mayo Court read the prior cases to establish as a centerpiece of this branch of law that for a claimed invention based on the implementation of a law of nature or a "principle" to gain a patent monopoly, the implementation must not be conventional or trivial but must instead be inventive, which is to say, presumably, novel and not obvious. This has led to further controversy, as discussed in Mayo v. Prometheus and Ariosa v. Sequenom. The subsequent opinion of the Supreme Court in Alice Corp. v. CLS Bank International confirmed the reaffirmation of Flook in the Mayo case, holding that simply implementing an abstract idea on a computer could not confer patent eligibility.
