= Diamond v. Chakrabarty =

- Supreme Court of the United States

Argued March 17, 1980 Decided June 16, 1980
- Full case name: Sidney A. Diamond, Commissioner of Patents and Trademarks, v. Ananda M. Chakrabarty, et al.
- Citations: 447 U.S. 303 (more) 100 S. Ct. 2204; 65 L. Ed. 2d 144; 1980 U.S. LEXIS 112; 206 U.S.P.Q. (BNA) 193

Case history
- Prior: Application of Bergy, 596 F.2d 952 (C.C.P.A. 1979); cert. granted, 444 U.S. 924 (1979)

Holding
- Living, man-made micro-organism is patentable subject matter as a "manufacture" or "composition of matter" within the meaning of the Patent Act of 1952. The fact that the organism sought to be patented is alive is no bar to patentability. Decision of the Court of Customs & Patent Appeals affirmed.

Court membership
- Chief Justice Warren E. Burger Associate Justices William J. Brennan Jr. · Potter Stewart; Byron White · Thurgood Marshall; Harry Blackmun · Lewis F. Powell Jr. William Rehnquist · John P. Stevens

Case opinions
- Majority: Burger, joined by Stewart, Blackmun, Rehnquist, Stevens
- Dissent: Brennan, joined by White, Marshall, Powell

Laws applied
- Patent Act of 1952, specifically 35 U.S.C. § 101

Diamond v. Chakrabarty, 447 U.S. 303 (1980), was a United States Supreme Court case dealing with whether living organisms can be patented. Writing for a five-justice majority, Chief Justice Warren E. Burger held that human-made bacteria could be patented under the patent laws of the United States because such an invention constituted a "manufacture" or "composition of matter". Justice William J. Brennan Jr., along with Justices Byron White, Thurgood Marshall, and Lewis F. Powell Jr., dissented from the Court's ruling, arguing that because Congress had not expressly authorized the patenting of biological organisms, the Court should not extend patent law to cover them.

In the decades since the Court's ruling, the case has been recognized as a landmark case for U.S. patent law, with industry and legal commentators identifying it as a turning point for the biotechnology industry.

== Background ==
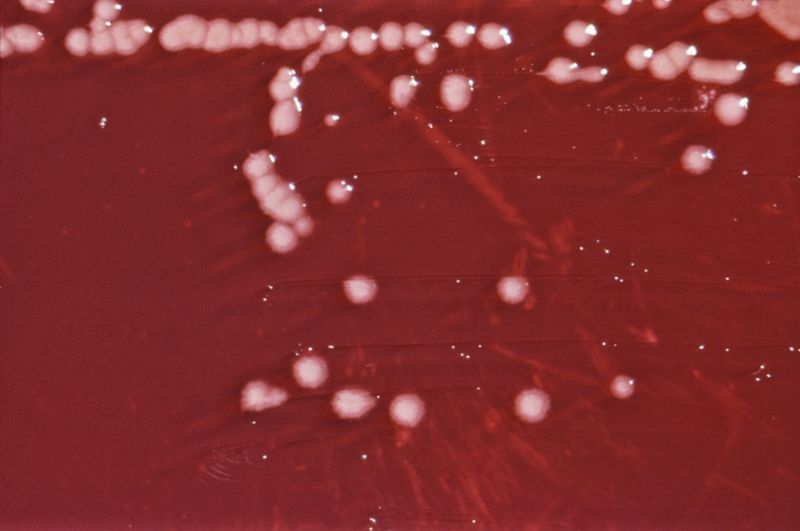
Pseudomonas bacteria as seen in a petri dish.

Genetic engineer Ananda Mohan Chakrabarty, working for General Electric, developed a bacterium (derived from the Pseudomonas genus and now known as Pseudomonas putida) capable of breaking down crude oil, which he proposed to use in treating oil spills. General Electric filed a patent application for the bacterium in the United States listing Chakrabarty as the inventor, but the application was rejected by a patent examiner, because under patent law at that time, living things were generally understood to not be patentable subject matter under 35 U.S.C. § 101.

General Electric and Chakrabarty appealed the examiner's decision to the Board of Patent Appeals and Interferences. The Board however agreed with the examiner that the bacterium was not patentable under current law. General Electric and Chakrabarty thereafter appealed the Board's decision to the United States Court of Customs and Patent Appeals. This time, General Electric and Chakrabarty prevailed with the court overturning the examiner's decision and holding "the fact that micro-organisms are alive is without legal significance for purposes of the patent law." The Patent Office, in the name of its Commissioner, Sidney A. Diamond, appealed this decision to the Supreme Court.

== Supreme Court opinion ==
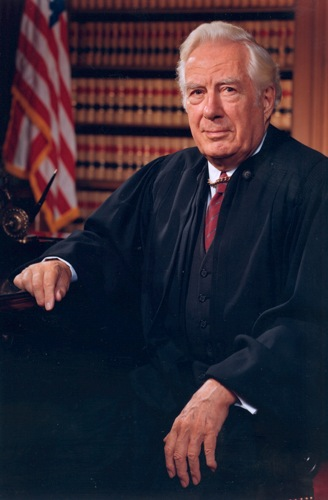
Chief Justice Warren E. Burger, who authored the majority opinion.

The Supreme Court heard oral argument from the parties on March 17, 1980 and issued its decision on June 16, 1980. In a 5–4 ruling, the Court ruled in favor of Chakrabarty and affirmed the decision of the Court of Customs and Patent Appeals.

Writing for the majority, Chief Justice Warren E. Burger began by noting that 35 U.S.C. § 101 allowed inventors to obtain patents for a "manufacture" or "composition of matter". The majority noted that while these words indicated that Congress intended for the patent laws to be given a "broad scope", this scope was not unlimited and that, under the Court's precedents, "laws of nature, physical phenomena, and abstract ideas" were not patentable. However, the Court held that these precedents were inapplicable to Chakrabarty's case as he was not trying to patent a "natural phenomena" but rather a human-made bacterium that he, himself, had developed. The majority contrasted this outcome with the one reached nearly 50 years prior in Funk Bros. Seed Co. v. Kalo Inoculant Co., where the Court had rejected a patent application for the discovery of a naturally occurring bacterium that could be used to improve crops. Unlike the patentee in Funk Bros., the Supreme Court here held that Chakrabarty had not merely discovered the bacteria's existence, he had created it himself and adapted it to a particular purpose.

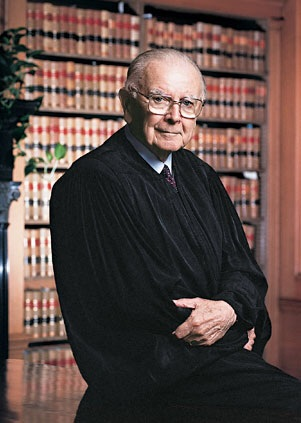
Justice William J. Brennan Jr., who authored the dissenting opinion.

Justice William J. Brennan Jr., joined by Justices Byron White, Thurgood Marshall, and Lewis F. Powell Jr., dissented from the Court's ruling. Looking at the legislative history of the patent laws, Justice Brennan concluded that Congress had demonstrated an intent to exclude living organisms from the scope of the country's patent laws. Justice Brennan also expressed concern that the Court was extending patent protections into areas not expressly authorized by Congress and that this constituted an inappropriate extension of monopoly patent power.

== Impact ==
In the decades following the Supreme Court's ruling, commentators have classified Diamond v. Chakrabarty as an important legal decision, particularly with respect to the patent laws and the biotechnology industry. In 2018, Time identified the decision as one of 25 important moments in American history, with Professor Gerardo Con Diaz remarking that the decision allowed "inventors at private and public institutions alike to obtain patents for genetically modified organisms — from plants and animals for laboratory research, to many foods available in supermarkets today" and allowed biotechnology firms to protect their developments in new ways. Writing for IP Watchdog on the decision's 30th anniversary, Gene Quinn called the decision a "turning point for the biotech industry" and praised the Court's ruling as "emblematic of the need for an expansive view of what is patentable subject matter." Likewise, the Biotechnology Innovation Organization praised the decision as being "instrumental in spurring the creation of a dynamic and flourishing biotech industry." Nature similarly noted that, at least according to industry participants, "without Diamond v. Chakrabarty, commercial biotechnology based on recombinant DNA technologies would not exist today."

However, the Supreme Court's ruling has also attracted some criticism from scholars who believe the Court extended patent law in a way that Congress did not authorize. Writing in the Ohio State Law Journal, Frank Darr criticized the Court's decision as containing "serious interpretive problems" and "reflect[ing] a policy choice" by the majority rather than a neutral legal analysis.

== Further criticisms ==
George Mason University's Center for Intellectual Property and Innovation Policy has pointed out that, in the wake of Diamond v. Chakrabarty, the courts have continued to affirm the right of biotech industry developers to continue to claim ownership of altered biological life, while clarifying some limits in Mayo v. Prometheus and AMP v. Myriad. The Center has expressed concern over what may be interpreted as judicial activism, with this ambitious legal thrust in advance of Congressional ability to thoughtfully consider appropriate legislation.

While cases subsequent to Chakrabarty have provided some safeguards, such as forbidding the patenting of "limited DNA sequences", concerns have arisen that these safeguards do not go far enough, and that "biopiracy" of the human genome could take place, especially in an era of global health crisis demanding a rapid pharmaceutical response. A legal collaboration at the University of Pittsburgh suggests that it "is a stretch" to label such presumptuous genomic editing as outright slavery. However, as such editing in its most contemporary form may include the insertion of what has been termed by the industry as an entire "operating platform", concerns may continue.

== See also ==
- List of United States Supreme Court cases, volume 447
- Genetic engineering in the United States
