= Neilson v Harford =

1841 case in UK patent law

- Court: Court of Exchequer Chamber
- Decided: 1841
- Citation: (1841) 151 ER 1266, 8 M&W 806, Web. Pat. Cases 295

Court membership
- Judges sitting: Parke B, Alderson B

Neilson v Harford (1841) 151 ER 1266 is a 19th-century English patent law decision that several United States Supreme Court patent law opinions rely upon as authority. The question, as Baron Alderson posed it, was “[W]here is the difference between claiming a principle, which is to be carried into effect any way you will, and claiming a mere principle?” The answer, as the opinions of the various courts that have considered the matter develop, is nowhere.

== Facts ==
Neilson's 1829 hot blast apparatus, employed at the Clyde Iron Works, Glasgow

Before Neilson's discovery of the hot-blast process, it was commonly believed that the manufacture of iron was more effective the colder the air blast was, and ironmasters therefore attempted to lower the temperature of the air in the blast. Neilson discovered that a blast furnace for converting high-carbon iron to lower-carbon iron or steel worked better if the air was heated before being blown through the molten iron. He therefore passed the air through a heated chamber on its way to the molten iron. The relevant technology is discussed elsewhere in Wikipedia.

Neilson did not specify in detail what form the chamber for heating the air should take. He merely said:

The air-vessel or receptacle may be conveniently made of iron, but as the effect does not depend upon the nature of the material, other metals or convenient materials may be used. The size of the air-vessel must depend upon the blast, and upon the heat necessary to be produced. For an ordinary smith’s fire or forge, an air-vessel or receptacle capable of containing 1200 cubic inches will be of proper dimensions; and for a cupola of the usual size for cast-iron founders, an air-vessel capable of containing 10,000 cubic inches will be of a proper size.

It was asserted that using the hot blast produced three times as much iron with the same amount of fuel as the cold blast did. In addition, the hot blast process permitted the use of cheaper coal instead of more expensive coke, which made it economical to exploit cheaper low-grade iron ore.

== Judgment ==
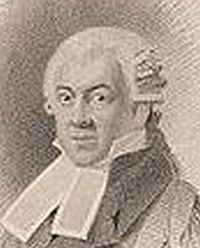
Baron Parke delivered the opinion of the court in this case

The Exchequer Court rejected the argument made by the defendants that the patent merely covered the principle that furnace temperature could be increased by injecting hot air instead of cold air into the furnace, for the principle of itself could not be patented. It ruled instead that the patent covered the use of the heated chamber. Baron Parke observed,

We think the case must be considered as if, the principle being well known, the plaintiff had first invented a mode of applying it by a mechanical apparatus to furnaces; and his invention then consists in this — by interposing a receptacle for heated air between the blowing apparatus and the furnace. In this receptacle he directs the air to be heated by the application of heat externally to the receptacle, and thus he accomplishes the object of applying the blast, which was before of cold air, in a heated state to the furnace.

== Scope of patent ==
The scope of Neilson's patent was questioned in this and other cases. What constituted a receptacle or reservoir? Some accused infringers used a network of pipes, which they claimed worked better than Neilson’s box-like receptacle, because of a greater surface area, which facilitated better heat transfer.

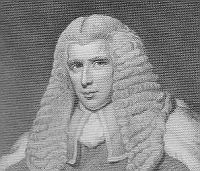
Baron Alderson

Baron Alderson said that Neilson’s patent covered use of an “intermediate reservoir between the blast furnace and the bellows.” Therefore, “surely anybody else may apply the same principle, provided he does not do it by a reservoir intermediately between the blast furnace and the bellows.” It then became a fact question as to what constituted a “reservoir”. It was for the jury to decide, Baron Alderson said, “whether or not a long spiral pipe is a reservoir,” for “if it be not a reservoir, or a colourable imitation of a reservoir, it is no infringement.”

Neilson himself apparently thought that it made no difference what the shape of the receptacle was, since his specification said that the shape and form of the receptacle was immaterial.

== Further developments ==
Neilson v Harford was only one of some twenty cases that Neilson asserted under his patent in England and Scotland.

== Application by US Supreme Court ==
The United States Supreme Court explained the Neilson decision in O'Reilly v. Morse:

It is very difficult to distinguish it [the Neilson patent] from the specification of a patent for a principle, and this at first created in the minds of the Court much difficulty; but after full consideration, we think that the plaintiff does not merely claim a principle, but a machine, embodying a principle, and a very valuable one. We think the case must be considered as if the principle being well known, the plaintiff had first invented a mode of applying it. We think this case must also be considered as if the principle or mathematical formula were well known.

In Parker v. Flook, the Supreme Court emphasized and adopted Baron Alderson’s statement in Neilson (repeated in Morse) that “the case must be considered as if, the principle being well known, the plaintiff had first invented a mode of applying it by a mechanical apparatus,” which is to say that the abstract idea or natural principle must be considered as if part of the prior art and the invention, if any, is in the mechanical implementation of the principle. Thus, if the implementation is concededly conventional, as it was in Flook, or trivial, as it was in Funk Brothers Seed Co. v. Kalo Inoculant Co., the subject matter cannot be patented. This analysis was repeated in Mayo Collaborative Services v. Prometheus Laboratories, Inc.

In the Neilson opinion, however, there is no mention of whether the expedient of interposing a heated box in the air line involved an inventive step. The mere fact of using any apparatus appears to have been sufficient to take the case out of being one of a patent on a principle. This is quite different from the rule in the Flook, Mayo, and Alice cases, as one commentator has noted:

The rationale of Neilson is that the patent is on an apparatus or machinery implementing the natural principle, rather than on the principle itself. The decision does not judge the difficulty or complexity of the implementing device. It does not consider whether the implementation is trivial, once one is in possession of the principle. At first blush, heating a receptacle or its equivalent to get the air hot seems the natural, perhaps the only sensible, way to heat the air. But this is 170 or more years later and perhaps we are in no position to judge that. But the question of triviality in implementation came to the fore in the 20th century and now in Prometheus as well.

== See also ==
- James Beaumont Neilson
- Thomas Turner, The air used in the blast furnace, The Metallurgy of Iron, ch. vii (1908).
