= Mayo Collaborative Services v. Prometheus Laboratories, Inc. =

Mayo v. Prometheus
- Supreme Court of the United States

Argued December 7, 2011 Decided March 20, 2012
- Full case name: Mayo Collaborative Services, DBA Mayo Medical Laboratories, et al. v. Prometheus Laboratories, Inc.
- Docket no.: 10-1150
- Citations: 566 U.S. 66 (more) 132 S. Ct. 1289; 182 L. Ed. 2d 321; 2012 U.S. LEXIS 2316
- Argument: Oral argument

Case history
- Prior: Patent held invalid, 2008 WL 878910 (S.D. Cal.); reversed, 581 F.3d 1336 (Fed. Cir. 2009); vacated and remanded in light of Bilski v. Kappos, 130 S.Ct. 3543 (2010); reversed anew, 628 F.3d 1347 (Fed. Cir. 2010); certiorari granted, 131 S.Ct. 3027 (2011)

Holding
- A diagnostic method that is based on a newly discovered natural correlation and utilizes well-known routine methods of analysis is not patent eligible subject matter because the method does not add an inventive concept to the application of the natural laws.

Court membership
- Chief Justice John Roberts Associate Justices Antonin Scalia · Anthony Kennedy; Clarence Thomas · Ruth Bader Ginsburg; Stephen Breyer · Samuel Alito; Sonia Sotomayor · Elena Kagan

Case opinion
- Majority: Breyer, joined by unanimous

Laws applied
- 35 U.S.C. § 101

Mayo v. Prometheus, 566 U.S. 66 (2012), was a case decided by the Supreme Court of the United States that unanimously held that claims directed to a method of giving a drug to a patient, measuring metabolites of that drug, and with a known threshold for efficacy in mind, deciding whether to increase or decrease the dosage of the drug, were not patent-eligible subject matter.

The basic idea behind the court's decision in Mayo is as follows: although a discovery of a new natural phenomenon (or a law of Nature) would satisfy the non-obviousness requirement, patent claims, that either wholly pre-empt the natural phenomenon or add no additional "inventive concept" to this discovery, do not meet patent-eligible subject matter criterion.

The decision was controversial, with proponents claiming it frees clinical pathologists to practice their medical discipline, and critics claiming that it destabilizes patent law and will stunt investment in the field of personalized medicine, preventing new products and services from emerging in that field. A 2017 study suggested that the decision has led to increased preference for trade secrecy over patenting among companies developing genetic medicine.

== Parties to the case ==
The case arose in a dispute between Mayo Collaborative Services and Prometheus Laboratories concerning a diagnostic test. Mayo Collaborative Services is a for-profit diagnostic testing lab offering diagnostic services that operates as a subsidiary of Mayo Foundation for Medical Education and Research, which is a nonprofit corporation affiliated with the Mayo Clinic. Mayo Collaborative Services does business as "Mayo Medical Laboratories", has 3,200 employees working in 58 laboratories and offers services worldwide.

Prometheus is a specialty pharmaceutical and diagnostics company in the fields of gastroenterology and cancer; it was bought by Nestlé in 2011. Prometheus sells diagnostic kits and also offers diagnostic services as a diagnostic testing lab.

== Patents at issue ==
The two US patents in the case are 6,355,623 and 6,680,302, which are owned by Hospital Sainte-Justine in Montreal. The patents concern the use of thiopurine drugs in the treatment of autoimmune diseases, such as Crohn's disease and ulcerative colitis. Different people metabolize these drugs differently, so doctors have to work with patients to find the right dose. If the dose is too high there are too many side effects, while if the dose is too low the drug does not work. When the patents were filed, the metabolites of these drugs were known, most importantly, 6-thioguanine, but the "right" level of these metabolites was not known. The scientists at Hospital Sainte-Justine identified the threshold level for effectiveness, and filed for patent protection on methods to use that threshold level to determine dosage.

The Supreme Court took claim 1 of the '623 patent as exemplary:

A method of optimizing therapeutic efficacy for treatment of an immune-mediated gastrointestinal disorder, comprising:

- (a) administering a drug providing 6-thioguanine to a subject having said immune-mediated gastrointestinal disorder; and
- (b) determining the level of 6-thioguanine in said subject having said immune-mediated gastrointestinal disorder,

wherein the level of 6-thioguanine less than about 230 pmol per 8 × 10^{8} red blood cells indicates a need to increase the amount of said drug subsequently administered to said subject and wherein the level of 6-thioguanine greater than about 400 pmol per 8 × 10^{8} red blood cells indicates a need to decrease the amount of said drug subsequently administered to said subject.

== The dispute ==
Prometheus is the exclusive licensee of these patents and sells diagnostic kits based on them. Mayo bought and used these kits until 2004, when it decided to offer its own diagnostic tests to its clients at Mayo and worldwide, without buying the kit from Prometheus. In June 2004 Prometheus sued Mayo for infringement in the Southern District Court of California, and in March 2008 the district court held the patents invalid under §101 (the section of US law governing patentable subject matter.)

== District Court ruling ==
The District Court characterized the claims as having three steps: (1) administering the drug to a subject, (2) determining metabolite levels, and (3) being warned that an adjustment in dosage may be required. All parties acknowledged that the first two steps, by themselves, were already known, and that the third step contained the novel matter that drove the patent filing. Mayo argued that only the third step mattered, and that the claims covered unpatentable subject matter. Prometheus argued that all the steps in the claims had to be considered, and that the whole process was new and was patentable subject matter.

The court found that the first two steps were just "data-gathering", leaving the third step as merely an unpatentable mental step, comprising the correlation, because no step required a change in administered dose. Further, the court found that the inventors of the patents did not invent the correlation, because the metabolites detected according to the patent claims "are products of the natural metabolizing of thiopurine drug, and the inventors merely observed the relationship between these naturally-produced metabolites and therapeutic efficacy and toxicity." Having determined that the claims encompass the correlations themselves, the District Court held that the claims "wholly preempt" the correlations.

These two findings—that the claims cover only natural phenomena, and that the claims cover any application of the natural phenomena—led squarely to a rejection under §101, just as if someone tried to claim Einstein's equation "E=mc^{2}" as opposed to, for example, an innovative machine that made use of that law of nature.

== First Federal Circuit decision ==
Prometheus appealed, and in September 2009 the Federal Circuit reversed the District Court, finding that the claims were patentable. The Federal Circuit found that the District Court erred in its analysis of the first two steps. The Federal Circuit found that these steps were not just "data gathering", but rather that they called for two physical transformations—first administering the drug to the patient, which transforms the patient, and secondly measuring the metabolites, which involves several concrete, transformative steps. The Federal Circuit relied on its own decision In re Bilski in this analysis; in that decision, the court stated that if a method requires a specific machine for its implementation, or involves a physical transformation, it is patentable.

The Federal Circuit also found that the District Court erred in not treating each claim as a whole. The decision said:

[I]t is inappropriate to determine the patent eligibility of a claim as a whole based on whether selected limitations constitute patent-eligible subject matter. After all, even though a fundamental principle itself is not patent-eligible, processes incorporating a fundamental principle may be patent-eligible. Thus, it is irrelevant that any individual step or limitation of such processes by itself would be unpatentable under § 101.

Finally, the Federal Circuit found that because the claims are directed to an entire process, and not just the correlation itself, the claims do not preempt all applications of the correlation.

== Remand and second Federal Circuit decision ==
Mayo appealed to the Supreme Court, and in June 2010 the Supreme Court granted certiorari and immediately vacated the Federal Circuit decision and remanded the case back to the Federal Circuit for further consideration in light of the Supreme Court's ruling on the Bilski case (in other words, it issued a GVR Order). The Supreme Court's Bilski decision made the machine-or-transformation test less absolute, calling it only an "important clue" to patentability.

In December 2010, the Federal Circuit issued its new ruling on the case. The Federal Circuit essentially re-iterated the arguments it had made the first time. Its decision acknowledged the Supreme Court's Bilski decision, but still found the first two steps were transformative and that the claim as a whole was patentable. The Federal Circuit went into more depth on the third step, the "mental step", noting that:

a subsequent mental step does not, by itself, negate the transformative nature of prior steps. Thus, when viewed in the proper context, the final step of providing a warning based on the results of the prior steps does not detract from the patentability of Prometheus's claimed methods as a whole.

== Supreme Court decision ==
Mayo again appealed to the Supreme Court, which agreed to take the case. It was argued on December 7, 2011 and the court handed down a unanimous decision on March 20, 2012. The Supreme Court reversed the Federal Circuit and basically reiterated the findings of the District Court.

The court called the correlation between the naturally-produced metabolites and therapeutic efficacy and toxicity to be an unpatentable "natural law" and found the first two steps to be not "genuine applications of those laws[, but] rather ... drafting efforts designed to monopolize the correlations." The court said, "Because methods for making such determinations were well known in the art, this step simply tells doctors to engage in well-understood, routine, conventional activity previously engaged in by scientists in the field. Such activity is normally not sufficient to transform an unpatentable law of nature into a patent-eligible application of such a law." A commentator on the ruling wrote: "The conclusion here is that (1) a newly discovered law of nature is itself unpatentable and (2) the application of that newly discovered law is also normally unpatentable if the application merely relies upon elements already known in the art."

The court seemed to be aware of the impact its decision would have on the diagnostics industry, as it ended its decision by writing:

In consequence, we must hesitate before departing from established general legal rules lest a new protective rule that seems to suit the needs of one field produce unforeseen results in another. And we must recognize the role of Congress in crafting more finely tailored rules where necessary.... We need not determine here whether, from a policy perspective, increased protection for discoveries of diagnostic laws of nature is desirable.

== Reactions and aftermath ==
=== Opinions critical of the decision ===
The decision was controversial. Those opposed to it found the reasoning poor, considered the decision to be destabilizing of patent law, and expressed concern about long-term effects on medicine.

Gene Quinn, a well-known pro-patent spokesman, blogging in IP Watchdog, stated one view of the decision: "The sky is falling! Those who feel the Supreme Court's decision in Mayo is terrible are right." He added:

Those in the biotech, medical diagnostics and pharmaceutical industries have just been taken out behind the woodshed and summarily executed by the Supreme Court this morning. An enormous number of patents will now have no enforceable claims. Hundreds of billions of dollars in corporate value has been erased.

Quinn then called for the Federal Circuit to overrule Mayo, as he asserted it had done with other erroneous precedents and predicted that it would do so with Mayo:

How long will it take the Federal Circuit to overrule this inexplicable nonsense? . . . Those well acquainted with the industry know that the Supreme Court is not the final word on patentability, and while the claims at issue in this particular case are unfortunately lost, the Federal Circuit will work to moderate (and eventually overturn) this embarrassing display by the Supreme Court. This will eventually be accomplished the same as it was after the Supreme Court definitively ruled software is not patentable in Gottschalk v. Benson, and the same as the ruling in KSR v. Teleflex will be overruled. . . . [T]here is still a lot of work left to be done by the Federal Circuit to finally overrule the Supreme Court's KSR decision. It took almost 10 years to overrule Gottschalk v. Benson, so we are likely in for a decade of work to moderate the nonsense [Mayo] thrust upon the industry this morning.

Kevin Noonan, a biotech patent lawyer and editor of the Patent Docs blog, criticized this decision and the Supreme Court broadly, for undermining precedent and the stability of patent law, thus broadly undermining the biotech industry. Noonan wrote:

It is also clear that the Court has little time for the specifics of patent law generally, not surprising from a Court who characterized obviousness law as "gobbledygook" not so many years ago. . . . [T]he Court also signaled its willingness to credit their theories of what drives and sustains innovation against the arguments, based on actual experience, from groups and individuals who have created companies and been involved in innovation in the biotechnology industry. And the Court seems equally ready to be influenced by the consumers of innovation, such as amicus the American Medical Association, who understandably wish to have the maximum freedom to have their patients benefit from new technology (and the minimum interference from patent holders who would reduce their opportunities to profit therefrom).

Robert R. Sachs, a patent lawyer and co-founder of The Bilski Blog, wrote:

The Court's analysis creates a framework for patent eligibility in which almost any method claim can be invalidated. . . . Reading the Court's treatment of Prometheus' claim, one would think that claims are some type of qualitative instruction manual, a recipe that speaks to "audiences" such as doctors, about which things are "relevant to their decision making." Claims are no such thing: they are definitions that articulate a specific combination of steps or structures. They are objective in form and design, not subjective or advisory. The notion that the claims here "trust" doctors to "use those laws" is at best silly, and at worst badly misguided. Reducing the claim to this "instruction manual" allows the Court to analogize the claim to Einstein "telling linear accelerator operators about his basic law"—a low point in modern legal reasoning.

Hans Sauer, an attorney for the biotech industry trade group, BIO, said, "We are troubled that the Court's opinion fails to appropriately recognize the importance of personalized medicine, and of the research and investment incentives needed to develop new individualized therapies for untreated diseases."

Kendrew H. Colton, a Chicago patent attorney, said that, because the ruling applies to the thousands of diagnostic patents that have already issued and puts them at risk of being invalidated, investors in personalized medicine "may revisit the value proposition for investments already made and may curtail or redirect future investments in new projects."

=== Opinions supportive of the decision ===
On the other hand, those in favor of the decision found it "a very high quality piece of legal craftsmanship" that "may well be the Supreme Court's finest work in the patent-eligibility field." Dr. Robert Wah, Chairman for the American Medical Association, said that the Supreme Court had "prevented irreparable harm to patient care with today's unanimous decision to invalidate two patents that gave Prometheus Laboratories exclusive rights over the body's natural responses to illness and medical treatment", and said that the decision was "a clear legal victory that ensures critical scientific data remain widely available for sound patient care and innovative medical research."

Another commentator, Professor Richard H. Stern, who teaches computer law at The George Washington University Law School, praised the decision because in it "the court for the first time agreed upon a full harmonisation of its prior and at times seemingly inconsistent judgments on patent-eligibility and how to determine it." In the same vein, this commentator praised the decision for reaffirming earlier precedents such as O'Reilly v. Morse and Neilson v. Harford, which the lower court in the Mayo case had ignored or seemingly misunderstood.

A business-oriented commentator viewed the decision as seeking to strike a balance between competing policy considerations:

While the collective groans of patent professionals the world over are hard to ignore after the decision in Prometheus, it was a necessary evil to safeguard against the likely potential for financial posturing of companies with exclusive rights over processes of the human body. Ultimately, the conclusion in Prometheus is premised upon the public policy consideration that certain types of medical and diagnostic findings should not be afforded patent protection, as the need for unencumbered access to critical scientific data and study in the medical community overwhelms any alleged monetary disincentive suffered by the patent applicant. The Court recognized that patent protection should not serve as a stumbling block for continued scientific innovation and improvement in medical treatment methodologies.

=== Response by the US Patent and Trademark Office ===
Prior to the Mayo v Prometeus decision the USPTO practice of patent eligibility of chemical diagnostic method was governed by the 2006 CAFC decision in LabCorp v. Metabolite, Inc., which held such claims patent-ineligible based on machine-or-transformation test. The US Supreme Court dismissed its own writ of certiorari for LabCorp v. Metabolite, Inc. as improperly granted, but the minority opinion in that case suggested a test, which was eventually adopted in Mayo v. Prometeus.

The Mayo decision made medical diagnostics methods a patentable subject matter. US Patent and Trademark Office released preliminary guidelines for patent examiners in light of this case on March 21, 2012. On July 3, 2012, it issued a more substantial set of "interim guidelines" for "process claims in which a law of nature, natural phenomenon, or naturally occurring relation or correlation is a limiting element or step" that replaced the preliminary guidelines.

Soon after "Mayo" (in 2014) the Supreme Court decided another patentable subject matter case in Alice Corp. v. CLS Bank International. In June 2020 the Office issued new guidelines on subject matter eligibility, which implement Mayo/Alice decisions and were incorporated into the MPEP, particularly in Sections 2103 through 2106.07(c).

== See also ==
- Alice Corp. v. CLS Bank International
- DDR Holdings, LLC v. Hotels.com
- Funk Bros. Seed Co. v. Kalo Inoculant Co.
- Parker v. Flook
- Association for Molecular Pathology v. Myriad Genetics, Inc.
- DDR Holdings, LLC v. Hotels.com
- Ariosa v. Sequenom
- Genetic Technologies v. Merial
- patent-eligibility trilogy
