= Funk Bros. Seed Co. v. Kalo Inoculant Co. =

Funk Brothers Seed Co. v. Kalo Inoculant Co.
- Supreme Court of the United States

Argued January 13, 1948 Decided February 16, 1948
- Full case name: Funk Brothers Seed Co. v. Kalo Inoculant Co.
- Citations: 333 U.S. 127 (more) 68 S. Ct. 440; 92 L. Ed. 588; 1948 U.S. LEXIS 2842; 76 U.S.P.Q. (BNA) 280

Case history
- Prior: 161 F.2d 981 (7th Cir. 1947) (reversed)

Holding
- The properties of inhibition or of noninhibition in the bacteria were "the work of nature" and therefore not subject to being patented.

Court membership
- Chief Justice Fred M. Vinson Associate Justices Hugo Black · Stanley F. Reed; Felix Frankfurter · William O. Douglas; Frank Murphy · Robert H. Jackson; Wiley B. Rutledge · Harold H. Burton

Case opinions
- Majority: Douglas, joined by Vinson, Black, Reed, Frankfurter, Murphy, Rutledge
- Concurrence: Frankfurter
- Dissent: Burton, joined by Jackson

Laws applied
- 35 U.S.C. § 31

Funk Brothers Seed Co. v. Kalo Inoculant Co., 333 U.S. 127 (1948), is a United States Supreme Court decision in which the Court held that a facially trivial implementation of a natural principle or phenomenon of nature is not eligible for a patent.

== Factual background ==
Leguminous plants are able to take nitrogen from the air and fix it in the plant for conversion to organic nitrogenous compounds. The ability of these plants to fix nitrogen from the air depends on the presence of bacteria that infect the roots of the plant and form nodules on them. These bacteria include six species of the genus Rhizobium. No one species works with all species of leguminous plants, but each works with different groups of those plants. Moreover, different species of Rhizobia bacteria produce an inhibitory effect on each other when mixed.

These bacteria have long been packaged for sale to and use by farmers in the inoculation of the seeds of leguminous plants, with each package containing only one species of root nodule bacteria, to avoid the mutual inhibition effect. The packaged inoculant could therefore be used successfully only in plants of the particular group corresponding to this bacterial species. Thus, if a farmer had crops of clover, alfalfa, and soybeans, they would have to use three separate inoculants.

The patentee discovered that there are strains of each species of root nodule bacteria which do not exert a mutually inhibitive effect on each other. Thus, he was able to provide a mixed culture of Rhizobia capable of inoculating plants belonging to several groups. Kalo exploited the claimed invention by selling multi-purpose packages containing a mixture of different species of Rhizobia suitable for different plants. Funk infringed by selling similar packages and Kalo sued for patent infringement. While the patent had claims both to the method of producing a multi-purpose inoculant by mixing together mutually non-inhibitive strains of Rhizobia and to the inoculant product comprising a mixture of mutually non-inhibitive strains of Rhizobia, the case before the Court involved only the product claims.

== Supreme Court opinion ==
The majority opinion (per Justice Douglas) held that the properties of inhibition or of noninhibition in the bacteria were “the work of nature.,” and therefore not subject to being patented. “[P]atents cannot issue for the discovery of the phenomena of nature.” The Court added:

The qualities of these bacteria, like the heat of the sun, electricity, or the qualities of metals, are part of the storehouse of knowledge of all men. They are manifestations of laws of nature, free to all men and reserved exclusively to none. He who discovers a hitherto unknown phenomenon of nature has no claim to a monopoly of it which the law recognizes. If there is to be invention from such a discovery, it must come from the application of the law of nature to a new and useful end.

The court of appeals thought that packaging the non-inhibitory strains together went beyond the discovery of a phenomenon of nature and conferred patentability, because a “new and different composition of noninhibitive strains…contributed utility and economy to the manufacture and distribution of commercial inoculants.” But the Supreme Court disagreed, and reversed, because the “aggregation of species fell short of invention within the meaning of the patent statutes.” The Court explained:

The aggregation of select strains of the several species into one product is an application of that newly discovered natural principle. But however ingenious the discovery of that natural principle may have been, the application of it is hardly more than an advance in the packaging of the inoculants. Each of the species of root nodule bacteria contained in the package infects the same group of leguminous plants which it always infected. No species acquires a different use. The combination of species produces no new bacteria, no change in the six species of bacteria, and no enlargement of the range of their utility. Each species has the same effect it always had. The bacteria perform in their natural way. Their use in combination does not improve in any way their natural functioning. They serve the ends nature originally provided, and act quite independently of any effort of the patentee.

… The application of this newly discovered natural principle to the problem of packaging of inoculants may well have been an important commercial advance. But once nature's secret of the noninhibitive quality of certain strains of the species of Rhizobium was discovered, the state of the art made the production of a mixed inoculant a simple step. Even though it may have been the product of skill, it certainly was not the product of invention. There is no way in which we could call it such unless we borrowed invention from the discovery of the natural principle itself. That is to say, there is no invention here unless the discovery that certain strains of the several species of these bacteria are noninhibitive, and may thus be safely mixed, is invention. But we cannot so hold without allowing a patent to issue on one of the ancient secrets of nature now disclosed.

… Since we conclude that the product claims do not disclose an invention or discovery within the meaning of the patent statutes, we do not consider whether the other statutory requirements…are satisfied.

== Rationale and subsequent developments ==
The Court decided this case under the patent statute in effect before the 1952 recodification, which distinguished obviousness from "invention." It is therefore not certain from the language used whether the Court held that the claimed invention was too obvious to justify a patent or, as appears more likely, that when the discovery of a phenomenon of nature is implemented in a facially trivial manner, the subject matter is not patent-eligible.

However, on the basis of how subsequent Supreme Court opinions, such as Gottschalk v. Benson and Parker v. Flook, treat Funk, it appears that the opinion is one on patent-eligibility.

A lower court opinion illustrating the application of the doctrine of the Funk case is Armour Pharmaceutical Co. v. Richardson Merrell, Inc. In that case, the patentee desired to administer trypsin orally for use as an anti-inflammatory. He discovered that trypsin could be absorbed effectively in the lower small intestine (ileum). However, stomach acids destroyed trypsin. The patentee proposed and claimed coating trypsin with an enteric coating (stomach-acid-resistant coating), which permitted the trypsin to pass through the stomach to the small intestine without damage to be absorbed and then, it would act as an anti-inflammatory or analgesic. However, the enteric coating expedient was already known for other products. The United States Court of Appeals for the Third Circuit invalidated the patent on the basis of Funk:

Our reading of the Supreme Court's opinion in Funk leads us to conclude that the test of patentability of a natural phenomenon is as follows: Would an artisan, knowing the newly discovered natural phenomenon require more than ordinary skill to discover the process by which to apply that phenomenon as the patentee had done? Once nature's secret that the ileum would absorb trypsin was uncovered, any artisan would have known the process of enterically coating the trypsin to enable it to pass through the acidic environment of the stomach and continue into the ileum.... [The inventor’s] application of that newly discovered principle would itself have to be inventive in order to sustain [the] patent.

Thus, the court held that according to Funk the manner of implementation of a natural principle must itself be patentable, as Parker v. Flook subsequently held.
