= In re Alappat =

- Court: United States Court of Appeals for the Federal Circuit
- Full case name: In re Kuriappan P. Alappat, Edward E. Averill and James G. Larsen
- Decided: July 29 1994
- Citations: 33 F.3d 1526; 31 U.S.P.Q.2d 1545

Holding
- That the claimed device was considered a machine or apparatus, not a mathematical formula, which fit within the categories considered as patentable subject matter. BPAI reversed.

Court membership
- Judges sitting: En banc Court: Chief Judge Glenn L. Archer Jr.; Circuit Judges Giles Rich, Helen W. Nies, Pauline Newman, Haldane Robert Mayer, Paul Redmond Michel, S. Jay Plager, Alan David Lourie, Raymond C. Clevenger, Randall Ray Rader, and Alvin Anthony Schall

Case opinions
- Majority: Rich

In re Alappat, 33 F.3d 1526 (Fed. Cir. 1994), along with In re Lowry and the State Street Bank case, form an important mid-to-late-1990s trilogy of Federal Circuit opinions because in these cases, that court changed course by abandoning the Freeman-Walter-Abele Test that it had previously used to determine patent eligibility of software patents and patent applications. The result was to open a floodgate of software and business-method patent applications, many or most of which later became invalid patents as a result of Supreme Court opinions in the early part of the following century in Bilski v. Kappos and Alice v. CLS Bank.

== Background ==
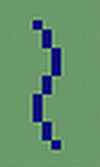
Illustration of how a curved line appears on an oscilloscope screen (magnified), showing "starcase effect" or "jaggies" – To smooth this so that it appears like a continuous curve is a problem the patent addresses

Kuriappan Alappat was an employee of Tektronix, an oscilloscope manufacturer. He and two other employees (Edward Averill and James Larsen, but for convenience the three will be referred to collectively as Alappat) devised a form of "rasterizer," which is a device used in a digital oscilloscope to smooth waveform data before displaying the waveform on the oscilloscope screen. (The irregularities in the waveform are called "jaggies.") The invention is a system for improving the appearance of digital oscilloscopes' screen displays by connecting data points smoothly without gaps or jaggies. A digital oscilloscope ordinarily represents data points as isolated points on the screen. Each point occupies a small area on the screen termed a "pixel." It is convenient to connect successive data points on the screen by a line, so that the data appears on the screen as a line graph.

There were two problems, however, with these displays. First, the jaggies would create a "staircase effect." Second, random noise superimposed on the signal makes the lines appear to flicker and move up and down or from side to side (which is called "aliasing").

The basic technique to overcome aliasing ("anti-aliasing") generally in use was to lessen the illumination intensity of those pixels more remote from the desired trajectory of the data points, in accordance with some formula or scheme (for example, least squares averaging). Conventional means were well known for varying the amount of energy delivered to the location of a pixel, in order to vary light intensity at the pixel.

In a cathode-ray tube (CRT), such as that for an oscilloscope, a beam of electrons is accelerated by an electromagnet coil around the neck of the tube. The electrons' speed (and therefore energy, and therefore illuminating effect) is proportional to the current in the coil at the time the electrons pass through it. Hence, to implement an anti-aliasing scheme one controls pixel intensity by varying CRT neck coil current in accordance with the scheme. The result is to provide variable illumination intensity for each pixel, so that the pixels closest to the trajectory of the data points on the screen are made brighter, and those farther away, dimmer. The procedure improves the appearance of the display by providing a continuous-appearing and non-jumping waveform.

Alappat devised what appears to be a novel and convenient anti-aliasing scheme—an anti-aliasing algorithm. The specification of the patent application disclosed how to provide a smooth-appearing waveform (something appearing to be a straight diagonal line without jaggies or staircase) by determining illumination intensity of each of the pixels in accordance with the new formula I' = c (1 - [Δy_{ij} / Δy_{i} ]). In this formula, c is an arbitrary constant, and the Δ values represent vertical pixel-to-pixel distances on the screen. A user of the system then makes the CRT's neck coil current proportional to I', as calculated according to the foregoing formula.

The PTO did not assert that the technology described above is the kind of thing with which the patent laws are concerned, but instead argued that what was claimed was different from that and was not patentable subject matter, because giving the claim its "broadest reasonable interpretation," and because it was drafted entirely in means-plus-function format, "each of the steps in this postulated process claim recites a mathematical operation, which steps combine to form a 'mathematical algorithm for computing pixel information,' and that, 'when the claim is viewed without the steps of this mathematical algorithm, no other elements or steps are found." In other words, Alappat's patent application described a device within an oscilloscope, that helps to control the oscilloscope's screen illumination in a certain way. But the issue, according to the PTO, was whether the patent claimed merely that thing or claimed something else, as well—something that goes beyond the kinds of thing on which the patent laws grant exclusive rights.

Claim 15, the only independent claim in issue in the case, read:

A rasterizer for converting vector list data representing sample magnitudes of an input waveform into anti-aliased pixel illumination intensity data to be displayed on a display means, comprising:

(a) means for determining the vertical distance between the endpoints of each of the vectors in the data list;

(b) means for determining the elevation of a row of pixels that is spanned by the vector;

(c) means for normalizing the vertical distance and elevation; and

(d) means for outputting illumination intensity data as a predetermined function of the normalized vertical distance and elevation.

== Proceedings in the PTO ==
The final decision of the PTO appellate board was that while the claim could be interpreted to describe machinery such as a combination of elements such as an arithmetic logic unit (ALU), read-only memory (ROM), and shift registers, it could also be interpreted to describe a programmed general purpose digital computer. The board considered the claim thus to be the equivalent of a claim to computer instructions for carrying out a mathematical algorithm and therefore not patentable subject matter under 35 U.S.C. § 101.

== The Federal Circuit's opinion ==
The Federal Circuit heard the case en banc, meaning before all judges active on the court. There were a number of procedural issues unrelated to the patentability of computer software, including whether the court had jurisdiction over the appeal. Three judges abstained from joining any opinion on the merits, because of the jurisdictional issues, which resulted in the court's being very fractured and making it difficult to put together a majority. One judge (Michel, J.) who believed the court was without jurisdiction nonetheless joined the majority opinion, so that a bare majority of the eleven sitting judges joined in the majority opinion.

=== Majority opinion ===
In the bare majority opinion for the court written by Judge Rich, the court found that Alappat claimed "a machine for converting discrete waveform data samples into anti–aliased pixel illumination intensity data to be displayed on a display means," and not an abstract idea. The court noted that "Alappat admits that claim 15 would read on a general purpose computer programmed to carry out the claimed invention." But this did not preclude the issuance of a patent, the court said, because the claimed subject matter was nonetheless a machine. "We have held that such programming creates a new machine, because a general purpose computer in effect becomes a special purpose computer once it is programmed to perform particular functions pursuant to instructions from program software." The court added: "In any case, a computer . . . is apparatus not mathematics."

=== Dissent ===
The dissent by Chief Judge Archer objected to the majority's invocation of the piano roll blues argument: "[T]he majority implicitly resurrects long-dead precedent of the Court of Customs and Patent Appeals in direct conflict with Supreme Court precedent and subsequent precedent of that court." Alappat claimed conventional apparatus (or a computer) arranged to make a mathematical calculation. The effect of the claim was to claim the mathematical calculation. Where "the invention or discovery is only of a 'new, useful, and nonobvious' process for solving a mathematical formula, Benson, Flook, Diehr, and years of precedent command that the patent law shall not exalt form over substance, but rather recognize that the substance is outside § 101."

Judge Archer (joined by Chief Judge Nies) argued that a Chopin-playing player piano does not magically become a "new" player piano simply because one inserts into it a piano roll for Brahms' Lullaby. He denied that a claim to a general-purpose digital computer running a new program could be directed to statutory subject matter:

It is illogical to say that although a claim to a newly discovered mathematical operation to be performed by a computer is merely a nonstatutory discovery of mathematics, a claim to any computer performing that same mathematics is a statutory invention or discovery.

== Aftermath ==
Initially, it was uncertain what the Federal Circuit had decided in this case. Counsel for Tektronix, the successful party in the case, said that the decision held only that "digital circuitry governed by mathematical formulas can be patented." He added, "The heart of the majority opinion rests on the conclusions that the Tektronix rasterizer was a machine. There is no justification, the majority said, in rejecting the patent simply because the machine made use of mathematics."

One commentator said that two widely different interpretations were possible for what the court said the patent-eligible invention was, when it asserted that a "computer operating pursuant to software may represent patentable subject matter" if it meets the requirements of Title 35:

One interpretation is that [what the court says may be patented is] some type of programmed computer equipment subsystem intertwined with an oscilloscope, in which case the scope of claim 15 is limited to an oscilloscope environment. Alternatively, "the claimed invention" also includes a free-standing microprocessor or general-purpose digital computer programmed to carry out the algorithm, in which event claim 15 is not limited to the oscilloscope environment and effectively covers the algorithm itself. The only way that this passage can make sense is if some of the terms have a secret or private, question-begging meaning that is different from their apparent meaning. For example, a programmed computer might "represent" patentable subject matter but not "be" patentable subject matter, whatever that might mean. Or maybe meeting "all of the other requirements of Title 35" means complying with section 101 as interpreted in Benson, Flook, Diehr, Abele, Schrader and so on. To say the least, this passage of the opinion is more poetic than lucid.

The same commentator pointed out that different post-Alappat panels of the Federal Circuit had "embraced diverse interpretations of the decision." It eventually became clear, after the Federal Circuit's 1998 State Street Bank decision, that the Federal Circuit had transitioned to a new patent-eligibility regime in which a patent would be allowed if the invention was able to "produce a useful, concrete, and tangible result." Moreover, the piano roll blues theory temporarily became dominant in the Federal Circuit for about a decade after Alappat.

In a 2006 dissenting opinion, U.S. Supreme Court Justice Breyer (joined by Justices Stevens and Souter, characterized the Alappat decision as one of the Federal Circuit's decisions in which it used a legal test that led to results opposite to those reached in several Supreme Court decisions.

In Bilski v. Kappos, 561 U.S. 593 (2010), the Supreme Court was unanimous that the "useful, concrete, and tangible result" test of Alappat and State Street was an incorrect statement of the law. The Federal Circuit had made the same ruling in In re Bilski, the judgment in which the Supreme Court affirmed in Bilski v. Kappos.
