= In re Ferguson =

- Court: United States Court of Appeals for the Federal Circuit
- Full case name: In re Lewis Ferguson, Darryl Costin and Scott C. Harris
- Decided: March 6, 2009
- Citations: 558 F.3d 1359; 90 U.S.P.Q.2d 1035

Case history
- Prior history: Board of Patent Appeals

Court membership
- Judges sitting: Pauline Newman, Haldane Robert Mayer, Arthur J. Gajarsa

Case opinions
- Majority: Gajarsa, joined by Mayer
- Concur/dissent: Newman

In re Ferguson, 558 F.3d 1359 (Fed. Cir. 2009) is an early 2009 decision of the United States Court of Appeals for the Federal Circuit, affirming a rejection of business method claims by the United States Patent and Trademark Office (USPTO). One of the first post-Bilski decisions by a Federal Circuit panel, Ferguson confirms the breadth of the en banc Bilski opinion's rejection of the core holdings in State Street Bank & Trust Co. v. Signature Financial Group, Inc.

Ferguson was brought as a test case by patent attorney Scott Harris in what proved to be an unsuccessful effort to compel the PTO to accept as patent-eligible subject matter a "paradigm," which is a pattern for a business organization. Harris was also one of the named inventors in the patent application. Harris also unsuccessfully sought to persuade the PTO and Federal Circuit to adopt as a test of patent-eligibility ---- "Does the claimed subject matter require that the product or process has more than a scintilla of interaction with the real world in a specific way?"

== Claims ==
The application presented two types of claims—method and so-called paradigm claims. Claim 1 was representative of the method claims:

A method of marketing a product, comprising:

developing a shared marketing force, said shared marketing force including at least marketing channels, which enable marketing a number of related products;
using said shared marketing force to market a plurality of different products that are made by a plurality of different autonomous producing company, so that different autonomous companies, having different ownerships, respectively produce said related products;
obtaining a share of total profits from each of said plurality of different autonomous producing companies in return for said using; and
obtaining an exclusive right to market each of said plurality of products in return for said using.

Claim 24 was representative of the so-called paradigm claims and read:

A paradigm for marketing software, comprising:

a marketing company that markets software from a plurality of different independent and autonomous software companies, and carries out and pays for operations associated with marketing of software for all of said different independent and autonomous software companies, in return for a contingent share of a total income stream from marketing of the software from all of said software companies, while allowing all of said software companies to retain their autonomy.

== Board decision ==
The Board concluded that the method claims were directed to an "abstract idea, and therefore were not patent-eligible subject matter. The Board then found that a "paradigm" does not fall within any of section 101's four enumerated categories of statutory subject matter. Then, turning to the paradigm claims' internal reference to "a marketing company," the Board said:

There is nothing in the record of this case that would suggest that "a marketing company" can be considered to be a process, a machine, a manufacture or a composition of matter. In other words, the paradigm claims on appeal are not directed to statutory subject matter under 35 U.S.C. § 101 because they are not directed to subject matter within the four recognized categories of patentable inventions. Therefore, the paradigm claims, claims 24-35, are not patentable under 35 U.S.C. § 101 for at least this reason.

== Federal Circuit decision ==
The method claims fell within the dictionary concept of a 'process," but were excluded from the statutory meaning of that term by the decision in Bilski. That decision holds that the Supreme Court's machine-or-transformation test is the "definitive test to determine whether a process claim is tailored narrowly enough to encompass only a particular application of a fundamental principle rather than to pre-empt the principle itself." Claim 1 does not satisfy either prong of the machine-or-transformation test. "Applicants' method claims are not tied to any particular machine or apparatus. Although Applicants argue that the method claims are tied to the use of a shared marketing force, a marketing force is not a machine or apparatus," because it is not a "mechanical device or combination of mechanical powers and devices to perform some function and produce a certain effect or result.'"

Furthermore, the method does not cause a transformation of an article into a different state or thing:

At best it can be said that Applicants' methods are directed to organizing business or legal relationships in the structuring of a sales force (or marketing company). But as this court stated in Bilski, "[p]urported transformations or manipulations simply of public or private legal obligations or relationships, business risks, or other such abstractions cannot meet the test because they are not physical objects or substances, and they are not representative of physical objects or substances.

Therefore, Ferguson's method does not satisfy the machine-or-transformation test.

Because they preceded Bilski, the Board's opinion and the parties' briefs and arguments extensively discussed the "useful, concrete, and tangible" test. "To avoid confusion," therefore, the court decided to "clarify here that in Bilski, this court considered whether this 'test' is valid and useful and concluded that it is not." The court then turned to attorney Harris's proposed new test for patent-eligibility — "Does the claimed subject matter require that the product or process has more than a scintilla of interaction with the real world in a specific way?" In the light of Bilski's "clear statements that the 'sole,' 'definitive,' 'applicable,' 'governing,' and 'proper' test for a process claim under § 101" was the machine-or-transformation test, the court refused to consider the proposed alternative test. The court then said that it would "reaffirm that the machine-or-transformation test is the singular test for a process claim under § 101" and "we decline to consider Applicants' method claims other than through the lens of the machine-or-transformation test."

The court then turned to the so-called paradigm claims. The court agreed with the Board that a paradigm falls within none of the four statutory categories and is therefore patent-ineligible. Nonetheless, the applicants argued that "[a] company is a physical thing, and as such analogous to a machine." The court responded that the paradigm was just a business model for organizing a marketing company; it was not a machine because it was not a combination of physical parts. As attorney Harris had conceded during oral argument, "you cannot touch the company." The court therefore ruled: "Indeed, it can be said that [these] paradigm claims are drawn quite literally to the 'paradigmatic "abstract idea."'" Accordingly, they were patent-ineligible.

Judge Newman dissented, arguing that there was still some life in State Street. Moreover, she challenged the machine-or-transformation test as being the sole remaining test of patent-eligibility.
