= Ex parte Gutta =

Ex parte Gutta (BPAI 2009) is a precedential decision from the Board of Patent Appeals and Interferences (BPAI) of the United States Patent and Trademark Office (USPTO) concerning the patentability of mathematical formulae and/or algorithms. The BPAI rejected Gutta as failing a two-prong test to determine if a machine or "manufacture" involving a mathematical algorithm complies with 35 U.S.C. § 101. The patentability of processes was previously addressed in a closely related case, In re Bilski.

== The Gutta Test ==
For a claimed machine (or article of manufacture) involving a mathematical algorithm

1. Is the claim limited to a tangible practical application, in which the mathematical algorithm is applied, that results in a real-world use (e.g. "not a mere field-of-use label having no significance")?
2. Is the claim limited so as to not substantially encompass substantially all practical applications of the mathematical algorithm either "in all fields" of use of the algorithm or even in "only one field?"

If the machine (or article of manufacture) fails either prong of the two-part inquiry, then the claim is not directed to patent eligible subject matter.

== See also ==
- Machine-or-transformation test
- Freeman-Walter-Abele Test
- Crouch, D. "The BPAI and the Machine or Transformation test of Bilski"
