= Business method patent =

Type of patent

Business method patents are a class of patents which disclose and claim new methods of doing business. This includes new types of e-commerce, insurance, banking and tax compliance, etc. Business method patents are a relatively new class of patent, and several reviews have investigated the appropriateness of patenting business methods. Nonetheless, they have become important assets for both independent inventors and major corporations.

== Background ==
In general, inventions are eligible for patent protection if they pass the tests of patentability: patentable subject matter, novelty, inventive step or non-obviousness, and industrial applicability (or utility).

A business method may be defined as "a method of operating any aspect of an economic enterprise".

== History ==
=== France ===
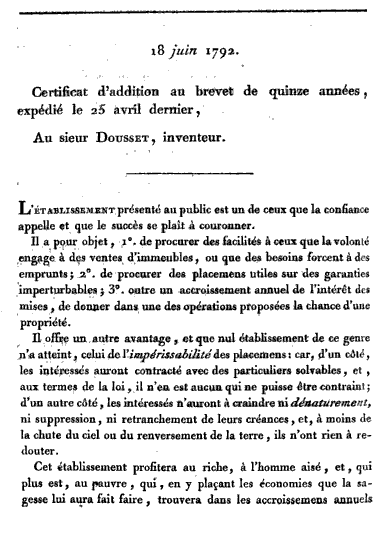
First page of Dousset 1792 French patent for a tontine

On January 7, 1791, the French revolutionary National Constituent Assembly passed a patent law that stated that "Any new discovery or invention, in all types of industry, is owned by its author". Inventors paid a fee depending upon the desired term of the patent (5, 10, 15 years), filed a description of the invention and were granted a patent. There was no preexamination. Validity was determined in courts. 14 out of 48 of the initial patents were for financial inventions. In June 1792, for example, a patent was issued to inventor F. P. Dousset for a type of tontine in combination with a lottery. These patents raised concerns and were banned and declared invalid in an amendment to the law passed in 1792.

=== Britain ===
In Britain, a patent was issued in 1778 to John Knox for a "[p]lan for assurances on lives of persons from 10 to 80 years of age". At this time in British law, patents could only be issued for manufactured objects, not manufacturing processes.

=== United States ===
Patents have been granted in the United States on methods for doing business since the US patent system was established in 1790. The first financial patent was granted on March 19, 1799, to Jacob Perkins of Massachusetts for an invention for "Detecting Counterfeit Notes". All details of Perkins' invention, which presumably was a device or process in the printing art, were lost in the great Patent Office fire of 1836. Its existence is only known from other sources.

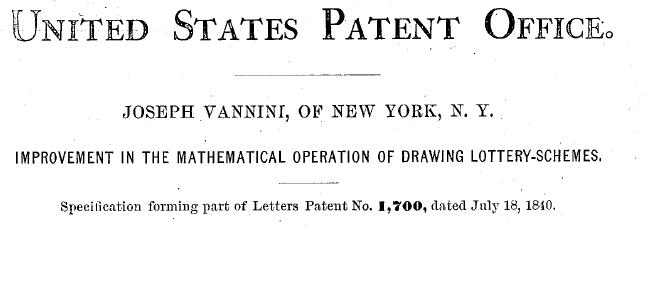
Header from 1840 US 1700 on a new type of private lottery

The first financial patent for which any detailed written description survives was to a printing method entitled "A Mode of Preventing Counterfeiting" granted to John Kneass on April 28, 1815. The first fifty years of the U.S. Patent Office saw the granting of forty-one financial patents in the arts of bank notes (2 patents), bills of credit (1), bills of exchange (1), check blanks (4); detecting and preventing counterfeiting (10), coin counting (1), interest calculation tables (5), and lotteries (17).

On the other hand, cases such as Hotel Security Checking Co. v. Lorraine Co., 160 F. 467 (2d Cir. 1908), which held that a bookkeeping system to prevent embezzlement by waiters was unpatentable, were often read to imply a "business method exception", in which business methods are unpatentable. Another such case was Joseph E. Seagram & Sons v. Marzell, 180 F.2d 26 (D.C. Cir. 1950), in which the court held that a patent on "blind testing" whiskey blends for consumer preferences would be "a serious restraint upon the advance of science and industry" and therefore should be refused.

==== The change in practice in the 1990s ====
A diagram showing the growth of business method patents

For many years, the USPTO took the position that "methods of doing business" were not patentable. With the emergence in the 1980s and 1990s of patent applications on internet or computer enabled methods of doing commerce, however, USPTO found that it was no longer practical to determine if a particular computer implemented invention was a technological invention or a business invention. Consequently, they took the position that examiners would not have to determine if a claimed invention was a method of doing business or not. They would determine patentability based on the same statutory requirements as any other invention.

The subsequent allowance of patents on computer-implemented methods for doing business was challenged in the 1998 State Street Bank v. Signature Financial Group, (47 USPQ 2d 1596 (CAFC 1998)). The court affirmed the position of the USPTO and rejected the theory that a "method of doing business" was excluded subject matter. The court further confirmed this principle with AT&T Corp. v. Excel Communications, Inc., (50 USPQ 2d 1447 (Fed. Cir. 1999)).

The USPTO continued to require, however, that business method inventions must apply, involve, use or advance the "technological arts" in order to be patentable. This was based on an unpublished decision of the U.S. Board of Patent Appeals and Interferences, Ex parte Bowman, 61 USPQ2d 1665, 1671 (Bd Pat. App. & Inter. 2001). This requirement could be met by merely requiring that the invention be carried out on a computer.

==== The reaction against business method patents after 2000 ====
In October 2005 the USPTO's own administrative judges overturned this position in a majority decision of the board in Ex parte Lundgren, Appeal No. 2003-2088 (BPAI 2005). The board ruled that the "technological arts" requirement could not be sustained, as no such requirement existed in law.

In light of Ex parte Lundgren, the USPTO has issued interim guidelines for patent examiners to determine if a given claimed invention meets the statutory requirements of being a process, manufacture, composition of matter or machine (35 USC 101). These guidelines assert that a process, including a process for doing business, must produce a concrete, useful and tangible result in order to be patentable. It does not matter if the process is within the traditional technological arts or not. A price for a financial product, for example, is considered to be a concrete useful and tangible result (see State Street Bank v. Signature Financial Group).

The USPTO has reasserted its position that literary works, compositions of music, compilations of data, legal documents (such as insurance policies), and forms of energy (such as data packets transmitted over the Internet), are not considered "manufactures" and hence, by themselves, are not patentable. Nonetheless, the USPTO has requested comments from the public on this position.

In 2006, Justice Kennedy of the US Supreme Court cast aspersions on business method patents when he commented that some of them were of "potential vagueness and suspect validity". This was expressed in a concurring opinion to the case of eBay Inc. v. MercExchange, L.L.C. There has been considerable speculation as to how this opinion might affect future business method patent litigation, particularly where a patent owner seeks an injunction to stop an infringer. In 2006, three Justices (Breyer, J., joined by Stevens and Souter, JJ.) dissented from the dismissal of certiorari as improvidently granted in Laboratory Corp. of Am. Holdings v. Metabolite Labs., Inc., arguing that State Street enunciated an erroneous legal test under which processes that the Supreme Court had held patent-ineligible would be held patent-eligible.

==== The Bilski case – 2010 ====
In Bilski v. Kappos, 561 U.S. 593 (2010), the Supreme Court held that the machine-or-transformation test is not the sole test for determining whether a claim comes within the "process" subject matter of the Patent Act and is thus patent eligible. Rather than being an exclusive test for eligibility, the machine-or-transformation test is "a useful and important clue", an investigative tool, for determining whether some claimed inventions are processes under § 101. With respect to the facts of the case before it, the Supreme Court affirmed the Federal Circuit's en banc rejection of an application for a patent on a method of stabilizing cost inputs in the energy industry by hedging price rises against decreases. The Court held that the investment strategy set forth in the application was an "abstract idea", making it ineligible under that exception to the general subject-matter areas listed in the Patent Act.

The Supreme Court's decision in Bilski v. Kappos affirmed but sharply qualified the Federal Circuit's 2008 en banc decision in In re Bilski. The decision announced a "machine-or-transformation" test of patent eligibility that, if it had been accepted as the exclusive for process patents, would have made ineligible many business-method patents granted in the last decade. Although the Supreme Court rejected its exclusive use, the test is still important as a "useful and important clue" for determining patent eligibility of claimed process inventions. Under this test: first, processes that transform an article from one state or thing to another are patent eligible regardless of whether their use requires a machine. Processes involving transformation of abstract financial data, such as that claimed in machine format in State Street, are probably patent ineligible. Second, processes that do not make patent-eligible transformations are patent eligible only if they are claimed to be carried out with a "particular machine". It appears that a programmed general-purpose digital computer is not a particular machine for this purpose. It is unclear from Bilski whether a particular machine must be novel and nonobvious, and specially adapted for carrying out the new process. The Supreme Court's decision in Parker v. Flook seems to call for that, but the Bilski court did not choose to opine on this point at that time.

The majority opinion in In re Bilski refused to hold business methods categorically ineligible on any ground. Judge Mayer's dissent, however, seconded by Judges Dyk's and Linn's concurring opinion, insisted that the US patent system is limited to technology and therefore it excludes trade and business expedients. Judge Mayer equated the US Constitution's limitation of patent grants to the "useful arts" to a limitation to technology, relying on case law stating that technology is the modern equivalent of useful arts.

In November 2007, the United States Internal Revenue Service proposed rules that would require tax filers who paid a license fee for a tax patent to declare that to the IRS.

==== The Alice case, 2014 ====
Several years later, in Alice v. CLS Bank, the Supreme Court readdressed the patent eligibility of a business method. It held patent ineligible a method of securing intermediated settlement—a form of electronic escrow. In invalidating Alice's patent, the Court announced a two-step test based on the Court's earlier decisions in Mayo v. Prometheus and Funk Bros. Seed Co. v. Kalo Inoculant Co. This test first determines whether the claimed invention is directed to an abstract idea, law of nature, mathematical formula, or similar abstraction. If it is, the court is to proceed to the second step—determining whether the way the claimed invention implements the abstraction contains an inventive concept, as contrasted with being routine and conventional. Under the Alice test, the claimed invention is patent eligible only if it contains an inventive concept.

The USPTO business method examining art units responded quickly to the Alice decision. Allowances per month for patents related to finance dropped to 10% of their pre Alice value. The Patent Trial and Appeal Board has reacted in a similar manner. Only about 20% of the appealed business method rejections by patent examiners are getting reversed by the board.

== Jurisdictions ==
Whether a business method is regarded as patentable subject matter depends on the legal jurisdiction. The World Trade Organization's Agreement on Trade-Related Aspects of Intellectual Property Rights (TRIPS) does not specifically address business method patents.

=== Australia ===
There is no general prohibition on the patentability of business methods in Australia. Their patentability is determined by applying the tests used to determine the patentability of any type of invention. However, in the decision of Grant v Commissioner of Patents [2006] FCAFC 120, at paragraph 47, the Full Court of the Federal Court of Australia held that a business method will only be patentable if it has a physical aspect, being a concrete, tangible, physical, or observable effect or phenomenon. Accordingly, 'pure' business methods, being those that do not have a physical aspect, are not patentable in Australia.

It has been suggested that Grant v Commissioner of Patents was wrongly decided because the court failed to properly apply the existing law as set out in the decision of the High Court of Australia in National Research Development Corporation v Commissioner of Patents (1959) 102 CLR 252 and that the court should not have imposed a physical aspect requirement.

=== Canada ===
A business method must be more than an abstract idea or theorem, otherwise it is not patentable in Canada. In order to be patentable, the business method must have a practical application.

However, a business method that is an abstract idea does not become patentable merely because it has a practical application. For example, a particular business method that is an abstract idea does not become patentable merely because it is programmed into a computer as an algorithm. For a business method to be patentable, the algorithm cannot be the whole invention, but only one aspect of a novel combination. See Amazon.com, Inc. v The Attorney General of Canada, 2011 FCA 328, November 24, 2011.

=== China ===
In April 2017, SIPO (i.e. the Chinese patent office) revised its patent examination guidelines to allow the patenting of business methods provided the method had technical features.

=== Brazil ===
According to Brazilian Patent Law 9279, "commercial, accounting, financial, educational, advertising, raffling, and inspection schemes, plans, principles or methods" are not considered to be inventions or Utility Models.

=== European Patent Convention ===
Under the European Patent Convention (EPC), "[s]chemes, rules and methods for (...) doing business" are not regarded as inventions and are not patentable, "to the extent that a European patent application or European patent relates to such subject-matter or activities as such".

However, "[i]f the claimed subject-matter specifies technical means, such as computers, computer networks or other programmable apparatus, for executing at least some steps of a business method, it is not limited to excluded subject-matter as such and thus not excluded from patentability under Art. 52(2)(c) and (3)." In such a case, the claimed subject-matter is considered to be of a technical nature and is not barred from patentability under Article 52(2)(c) and (3) EPC. It is then assessed, as a second step, whether the invention involves an inventive step, considering that the "features which do not contribute to the technical character of the invention cannot support the presence of an inventive step (T 641/00)".

=== India ===
Per Chapter II, Section 3, part (k) of the Indian Patent Act, business methods are not patentable per se. However they are patentable if a new method solves a "technical" problem and an apparatus/system is involved.

=== United States ===
Current US case law Alice Corp. v. CLS Bank International (decided June 2014) requires that in order for a business method to be patentable, it must be "significantly more" than simply implementing a well-known business process on a computer. The immediate response of the USPTO to this decision as of July 2014 has been to essentially stop allowing business method patents. The key issue is that examiners do not yet have clear guidance as to what is allowable under the Alice decision.

== Classification ==
In the 8th edition of the International Patent Classification (IPC), which entered into force on January 1, 2006, a special subclass has been created for business methods: "G06Q" (Data processing systems or methods, specially adapted for administrative, commercial, financial, managerial, supervisory or forecasting purposes). In the previous editions, business methods were classified in "G06F 17/60". This is purely a classification matter and will not change the patent laws however.

US patents describing methods of doing business that involve the use of a computer are classified in Class 705 ("data processing: financial, business practice, management or cost/price determination"). Class 705 includes sub-categories for industries such as health care, insurance, electronic shopping, inventory management, accounting, and finance.

== See also ==
- 1-Click, a business method patent application that was both accepted and rejected by various jurisdictions
- Software patent debate
- Decision T 931/95 (Pension Benefit Systems Partnership) of August 9, 2000 of the Boards of Appeal of the European Patent Office (EPO)
- DDR Holdings v. Hotels.com
