= Colorable =

Colorable or colourable may refer to:

- Graph coloring in mathematics
- A valid claim or colorable claim in law
