= Freeman-Walter-Abele Test =

US patent law judicial test

Freeman-Walter-Abele is a now outdated judicial test in United States patent law. It came from three decisions of the United States Court of Customs and Patent Appeals—In re Freeman, 573 F.2d 1237 (C.C.P.A. 1978), In re Walter, 618 F.2d 758 (C.C.P.A. 1980); and In re Abele, 684 F.2d 902 (C.C.P.A. 1982) —which attempted to comply with then-recent decisions of the Supreme Court concerning software-related patent claims.

== Overview ==
The test was used to determine whether a patent claim was directed entirely to mathematical principles or algorithms, which are not patentable subject matter. The aim of the test was to allow claims that do not attempt to monopolize traditionally patent ineligible subject matter, such as mathematics, thinking, and laws of nature. Though primarily concerned with mathematical algorithms the test has some applicability in all subject matter discussions. Its use peaked in 1994 with In re Schrader. Its use then faded, to be replaced by the now also superseded "useful, concrete, and tangible result" test of In re Alappat. The current legal test for patent eligibility is stated in the Supreme Court's decisions in Bilski v. Kappos, Mayo v. Prometheus, and Alice v. CLS Bank.

== Development from Freeman test ==
The Freeman test was:

First, it must be determined whether the claim directly or indirectly recites an "algorithm" in the Benson sense of that term, for a claim which fails even to recite an algorithm clearly cannot wholly preempt an algorithm. Second, the claim must be further analyzed to ascertain whether in its entirety it wholly preempts that algorithm.

In Freeman the invention was a system for typesetting alphanumeric information, using a computer-based control system in conjunction with a photo-typesetter of conventional design. The invention was:

... three signal-processing steps. First, the input codes are read, and a tree structure of symbols representing the mathematical expression is built. Second, the signals specifying the relative concatenation point positions of the symbols are composed by application of the local positioning algorithm. Third, an image of the expression, with all symbols in proper position, is generated on the CRT or other output device.

The court limited the term "algorithm" to mathematical algorithms or formulas. The court did not consider Freeman's step to be a formula or algorithm, and therefore reversed the PTO's claim rejections.

In Walter, the invention was a system for processing seismic "chirp" signals by mathematical procedures. The PTO asked the court to reconsider the second Freeman step, which the PTO asserted conflicted with the Supreme Court's Flook case. The court stated that the second Freeman step "involves examination of the claim 'to ascertain whether in its entirety it wholly preempts [the] algorithm.'" The court said it would rephrase "the second step of the Freeman test in terms other than preemption." The new version was:

If it appears that the mathematical algorithm is implemented in a specific manner to define structural relationships between the physical elements of the claim (in apparatus claims) or to refine or limit claim steps (in process claims), the claim being otherwise statutory, the claim passes muster under § 101. If, however, the mathematical algorithm is merely presented and solved by the claimed invention, as was the case in Benson and Flook, and is not applied in any manner to physical elements or process steps, no amount of post-solution activity will render the claim statutory; nor is it saved by a preamble merely reciting the field of use of the mathematical algorithm.

Furthermore, "if the end-product of a claimed invention is a pure number, as in Benson and Flook, the invention is non-statutory regardless of any post-solution activity which makes it available for use by a person or machine for other purposes." On the other hand, if the product invention produces a physical thing," such as a seismic trace, it could be patented. The court evaluated the claimed invention and decided that it was just a calculation and therefore patent ineligible.

Finally in Abele the invention was a system for processing CAT-scan signals. Once again, the court addressed and refined the second step of the analysis. The court said that the applicants appealing from the PTO's rejection had a valid point when they complained that the test set out two extreme ends of a spectrum and then failed to "provide a useful tool for analyzing claims in the 'gray area' which falls between the two ends of that spectrum." Now, the court reformulated the test in these terms:

Walter should be read as requiring no more than that the algorithm be "applied in any manner to physical elements or process steps," provided that its application is circumscribed by more than a field of use limitation or non-essential post-solution activity. Thus, if the claim would be "otherwise statutory," albeit inoperative or less useful without the algorithm, the claim likewise presents statutory subject matter when the algorithm is included. This broad reading of Walter, we conclude, is in accord with the Supreme Court decisions.

== Final Freeman-Walter-Abele test ==
The final version of the test has two parts. First, determining whether the claim recites an algorithm within the meaning of Benson. Second, determining whether the algorithm is "applied in any manner to physical elements or process steps" per In re Abele.

Under the final version of the Freeman-Walter-Abele test, any placement of any conventional obvious apparatus in the claim seemed to be enough for the court to find the subject matter patent eligible. In one case, a ROM for storing numerical squares was sufficient. This state of affairs was burlesqued in the mythical "Case of the Automated Substance Spreader," a computerized system for spreading fertilizer.

== Decline ==
This test was largely done away with by the Court of Appeals for the Federal Circuit with In re Alappat . Now, the result became most important. If a mathematical algorithm produced a "useful, concrete and tangible result" the claim was statutory subject matter. Thus by the later 1990s in cases such as AT&T Corp. v. Excel Communications, Inc. in 1999 and other similar cases, it became no longer to require presence of physical hardware elements.

The Freeman-Walter-Abele test was repudiated in 1998 in State Street Bank, which described it as having "little, if any, applicability to determining the presence of statutory subject matter."

However, it continued to have use in the patent office, which viewed it as much the same as the "practical application" and "useful, concrete and tangible results" tests.

== Death ==
It became clear in the In re Alappat case that a majority of the Federal Circuit had lost patience with the complexity of the Freeman-Walter-Abele test, but Chief Judge Nies and Judge Archer dissented from this step. The two Trovato decisions highlighted the difference in opinion. The original Trovato panel decision used the Freeman-Walter-Abele test to find that Trovato's claims were ineligible "abstract ideas." The vacatur order did not give any reason why the original opinion by Judge Nies was incorrect.

No subsequent Federal Circuit opinion was based on the Freeman-Walter-Abele test. The Federal Circuit then turned to the less complex "useful, concrete, and tangible result" test, but turned away from it in In re Bilski, which adopted a modified version of the Freeman-Walter-Abele test, known as the "machine-or-transformation test." On appeal of In re Bilski, in Bilski v. Kappos, and then in two subsequent cases, Mayo v. Prometheus and Alice v. CLS Bank, the Supreme Court held that the machine-or-transformation test was only a "useful clue" to patent eligibility and specified a two-step patent eligibility test in which the court first had to determine whether the patent claim under analysis was directed to an abstract principle and, if so, whether the principle was implemented in an inventive rather than conventional manner, as prescribed in Flook.

== See also ==
- Software patents under United States patent law
- Diamond v. Diehr
- Gottschalk v.Benson
- Parker v. Flook
- State Street Bank v. Signature Financial Group
- In re Abele
- In re Bilski
- Legal history

== Notes ==
The citations in this article are written in Bluebook style. Please see the talk page for more information.
