= Fixed bill =

Short-term debt instrument with a fixed interest rate

Fixed bill refers to an energy pricing program in which a consumer pays a predetermined amount for their total energy consumption for a given period. The price is independent of the amount of energy the customer uses or the unit price of the energy. Energy companies can offer this type of pricing by hedging the risks of fluctuating demand using weather derivatives.

== History ==
The ability to provide fixed bill energy contracts in the US grew out of the deregulation of the energy industry in the 1990s. An early pioneer in this field was the Equitable Gas Company. It proposed a one-year, fixed-bill natural gas contract to Allegheny County public schools in 1995.

The two inventors of the Equitable Gas product, Bernard Bilski and Rand Warsaw, then left Equitable and formed their own company, WeatherWise USA. Rand Warsaw is now CEO of the company. They have further developed the product and now offer a variety of fixed bill plans to energy companies under license. The energy companies, in turn, offer the plans to their customers.

== Patents ==
On April 16, 1996, Equitable Gas filed a patent application on their process. The inventors were Equitable employees, Bernard Bilski and Rand Warsaw. The title was “Energy Risk Management Method”. It had a description of a method for hedging the weather-related risk that contributes to fluctuating demand in a fixed bill pricing scheme. It has been viewed as a “pure” Business method patent and was rejected by the USPTO examiner, the USPTO board of appeals, the United States Court of Appeals for the Federal Circuit (case In re Bilski) and the Supreme Court of the United States (case Bilski v. Kappos).

Numerous other patent applications have been filed with several having issued. The patents cover different variations of fixed bill offerings.

== Commercial products ==
The following companies design fixed bill products and license them to distributors, such as utilities:

- WeatherWise USA
- Christensen Associates

The following energy companies offer fixed bill programs directly to consumers:

- Nicor Gas
- Wisconsin Public Service Corporation
- Duke Energy
- Alliant Energy
- WEC Energy Group

== Levelized payment ==
A Fixed Bill plan is different from a more traditional Levelized Payment plan. In a Levelized Payment plan, a consumer is billed an equal amount per month for a year based on their prior energy use. At the end of the year, however, the consumer will be billed for excess energy they may have used, or get a refund if their actual energy use was less than projected.

In a Fixed Bill plan, what a consumer pays is independent of what they use.

== Controversy ==
Fixed bill pricing programs have been investigated by States Attorneys General when participants' bills have been higher than nonparticipants' bills. In 2007, for example, Minnesota shut down a fixed bill program run by Xcel Energy and CenterPoint Energy when most participants paid higher than average bills for four out of five years.

== See also ==
- Swap (finance)
- Weather derivative
- Electricity meter
- Hedge (finance)
