= Shellabarger =

Shellabarger is a surname. Notable people with the surname include:

- M. Elizabeth Shellabarger (1879–1967), American Red Cross nurse
- Samuel Shellabarger (1888–1954), American educator and writer
- Samuel Shellabarger (1817–1896), American politician
- David S. Shellabarger (1837-1913), American pioneer capitalist, politician, and economist
