= Old Piano Roll Blues =

The Old Piano Roll Blues may refer to:

- a 1950 novelty hit song by Cy Coben
- Piano roll blues, a figure of speech originally referring to the Coben song, designating a legal argument concerning U.S. patent law relating to computer software
