= Lori Andrews =

American professor of law

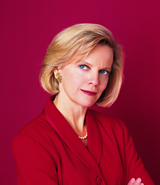
Professor Lori Andrews

Lori B. Andrews is an American professor of law. She is on the faculty of Illinois Institute of Technology Chicago-Kent College of Law and serves as Director of IIT's Institute for Science, Law, and Technology. In 2002, she was a visiting professor at Princeton University. She received her B.A. summa cum laude from Yale College and her J.D. from Yale Law School. Andrews is a Fellow of the Hastings Center.

== Career ==
Her litigation about reproductive and genetic technologies and the disposition of frozen embryos caused the National Law Journal to list her as one of the "100 Most Influential Lawyers in America". She was listed as a "Newsmaker of the Year", in the American Bar Association Journal's January 2008 issue. The ABA Journal described Andrews as "a lawyer with a literary bent who has the scientific chops to rival any CSI investigator" and "a genetics expert of international renown, whose influence in the legal ethics surrounding genetics doesn't stop at the border".

Andrews has also been involved in setting policies for genetic technologies. She has been an adviser on genetic and reproductive technology to the United States Congress, the World Health Organization, the National Institutes of Health, the Centers for Disease Control, the United States Department of Health and Human Services, the Institute of Medicine of the National Academy of Sciences, and several nations including the Emirate of Dubai and the French National Assembly. She served as chair of the federal Working Group on the Ethical, Legal, and Social Implications of the Human Genome Project. She also served as a consultant to the science ministers of twelve countries on the issues of embryo stem cells, gene patents, and DNA banking. She has advised artists who want to use genetic engineering to invent new living species. She is a contributor to a blog that covers topics of genetics and reproductive technologies.

Andrews is the author of fourteen books and more than one hundred scholarly articles, monographs, and book chapters on subjects including informed consent, medical genetics, and health policy. She coauthored the law school casebook Genetics: Ethics, Law and Policy (West Publishing, 3d edition, 2010) (with Mark Rothstein and Maxwell Mehlman). In June 2002, she was awarded the Health Law Teachers Award, given by the Health Law Teachers section of the American Society of Law, Medicine and Ethics. In March 2005, she was named an Honorary Fellow of the American College of Legal Medicine.

In her nonfiction work The Clone Age, published in 2000, Andrews offers a highly critical account of the motives and methods of a new generation of biological scientists. She expresses concerns about the role of venture capital in medical research and what she sees as technology racing ahead of legal and ethical ground rules.

Her book co-authored with sociologist Dorothy Nelkin, Body Bazaar: The Market for Human Tissue in the Biotechnology Age (Crown Publishers), discusses the psychological, social, and financial impacts of the commercialization of human tissue. Future Perfect: Confronting Decisions About Genetics (Columbia University Press) outlines the policy models that Andrews recommends for consideration as we enter an age of increasing knowledge of the human genome.

Her book I Know Who You Are and I Saw What You Did: Social Networks and the Death of Privacy (Free Press) was released in January 2012. In the book, she explains how individuals' rights are being violated and she proposes a constitution for social networks and the web.

Andrews is the author of three mystery novels that feature a female geneticist and military lawyer. The Silent Assassin (2007), the second novel in the Dr. Alexandra Blake series, revolves around enemy skulls brought back from the Vietnam War by American soldiers that are stored in a drawer at the National Museum of Health and Medicine in Washington, D.C. This story was based on six actual Vietnamese "trophy skulls" that are, in fact, stored in a drawer in Washington. On June 22, 2007, Andrews published an op-ed in The New York Times that urged President Bush to return the "trophy skulls". In September 2008, Andrews released the third installment of her mystery series, Immunity. The book involves a geneticist and DEA agent who works to stop an epidemic in the Southwest United States.

== Bibliography ==
Non-Fiction:

- New Conceptions: A Consumer's Guide to the Newest Infertility Treatments, Including in Vitro Fertilization, Artificial Insemination,& Surrogate Mother. New York: St. Martins, 1984. ISBN 0-312-56610-7
- State Laws and Regulations Governing Newborn Screening. National Center for Education in Maternal & Child Health, Georgetown University, 1985. ISBN 0-910059-04-7
- Between Strangers: Surrogate Mothers, Expectant Fathers, and Brave New Babies. Harper & Row, 1989. ISBN 0-06-016058-6
- Assessing Genetic Risks: Implications for Health and Social Policy. National Academy Press, 1994. Co-edited with Jane E. Fullarton, Neil A. Holtzman, and Arno G. Motulsky. ISBN 0-309-04798-6
- The Clone Age: Adventures in the New World of Reproductive Technology. Owl Books, 2000. ISBN 0-8050-6446-X
- Black Power, White Blood: The Life and Times of Johnny Spain. Temple University Press, revised edition, 2000. ISBN 1-56639-750-2
- Body Bazaar: The Market for Human Tissue in the Biotechnology Age. New York: Crown, 2001. With Dorothy Nelkin. ISBN 0-609-60540-2
- Future Perfect. New York: Columbia University Press, 2002. ISBN 0-231-12163-6
- Genetics: Ethics, Law and Policy. St. Paul: West, 2002, 2nd edition, 2006, 3rd edition, 2010. With Mark Rothstein and Maxwell Mehlman. ISBN 0-314-91186-3
- I Know Who You Are and I Saw What You Did: Social Networks and the Death of Privacy. New York: Free Press, 2012. ISBN 1-4516-5051-5

Fiction:

- Sequence. New York: St. Martin's, 2006. ISBN 0-312-94245-1
- The Silent Assassin. New York: St. Martin's, 2007. ISBN 0-312-35271-9
- Immunity. New York: St. Martin's, 2008. ISBN 0-312-35272-7

== See also ==
- Armed Forces Institute of Pathology
- Bioethics
- Biopolitics
- Eugenics Wars argument
- LabCorp v. Metabolite, Inc.
