= Defend Innovation =

U.S. patent reform project

- Mission statement: How to Fix Our Broken Patent System
- Commercial?: No
- Founder: Electronic Frontier Foundation
- Established: 19 June 2012
- Website: defendinnovation.org

Defend Innovation is a patent reform project started by Electronic Frontier Foundation (EFF) in June 2012. The project initially proposed seven changes to United States's patent system, including shortening the term for software patents, requirement to provide the running software code along with patent application, and avoidance of liability of an infringer who independently arrives at the patented invention.

== Results ==
Since June 2012, the project collected information about the patent system from lawyers, software engineers, court cases, and other sources. The information collected was combined with EFF's own expertise and compiled in a whitepaper named How to Fix Our Broken Patent System, which details the issues surrounding the patent system and proposes solutions that can be implemented by the Congress, Patent Office, and also the software companies. The whitepaper is available at the Defend Innovation website.

== See also ==
- Electronic Frontier Foundation
- Patent troll
- Software patent debate
