= Sub silentio =

Sub silentio is a legal Latin term meaning "under silence" or "in silence". It is often used as a reference to something that is implied but not expressly stated. Commonly, the term is used when a court overrules the holding of a case without specifically stating that it is doing so.

== Examples ==
=== United Kingdom ===
On cross-claims for liquidated and unliquidated damages, Potter LJ stated in 2001 that

It appears to me that the decision in Hanak –v- Green (1958) is a sub silentio precedent for the proposition that an unliquidated cross-claim may be set-off against an unliquidated primary claim.

=== United States ===
To assume that Congress, which had enacted a criminal sanction directed against state judicial officials, intended sub silentio to exempt those same officials from the civil counterpart approaches the incredible. Sheriffs and marshals, while performing a quintessentially judicial function such as serving process, were clearly liable under the 1866 Act, notwithstanding President Johnson's objections. Because, as Representative Shellabarger stated, § 1 of the 1871 Act provided a civil remedy "in identically the same case" or "on the same state of facts" as § 2 of the 1866 Act, it obviously overrode whatever immunity may have existed at common law for these participants in the judicial process in 1871.
