= In re Bilski =

2008 business method patent case

- Court: United States Court of Appeals for the Federal Circuit
- Full case name: In re Bernard L. Bilski and Rand A. Warsaw
- Argued: May 8 2008
- Decided: October 30 2008
- Citation: 545 F.3d 943, 88 U.S.P.Q.2d 1385

Case history
- Prior history: Claims rejected, Ex parte Bilski (BPAI 2006), appealed to CAFC, en banc hearing ordered sua sponte.
- Subsequent history: Bilski v. Kappos, 561 U.S. ___(2010) (Aff'd, Machine or Transformation test not the sole test for patent-eligible subject matter)

Holding
- The "useful, concrete and tangible result" test of State Street should no longer be relied on. A method claim is surely patentable subject matter if (1) it is tied to a particular machine or apparatus, or (2) it transforms a particular article into a different state or thing. BPAI affirmed.

Court membership
- Judges sitting: En banc Court: Chief Judge Paul Redmond Michel; Circuit Judges Pauline Newman, Haldane Robert Mayer, Alan David Lourie, Randall Ray Rader, Alvin Anthony Schall, William Curtis Bryson, Arthur J. Gajarsa, Richard Linn, Timothy B. Dyk, Sharon Prost, and Kimberly Ann Moore

Case opinions
- Majority: Michel, joined by Lourie, Schall, Bryson, Gajarsa, Linn, Dyk, Prost and Moore
- Concurrence: Dyk, joined by Linn
- Dissent: Newman
- Dissent: Mayer
- Dissent: Rader

Laws applied
- 35 U.S.C. § 101

In re Bilski, 545 F.3d 943, 88 U.S.P.Q.2d 1385 (Fed. Cir. 2008), was an en banc decision of the United States Court of Appeals for the Federal Circuit (CAFC) on the patenting of method claims, particularly business methods. The court affirmed the rejection of the patent claims involving a method of hedging risks in commodities trading, as non-patentable subject matter. Most importantly, the Court concluded, that machine-or-transformation test "was proper test to apply to determine patent-eligibility of process", and that the “useful, concrete and tangible result” of State Street Bank v. Signature Financial Group and AT&T Corp. v. Excel Communications, Inc. should no longer be relied upon.

In In re Ferguson, 558 F.3d 1359, 1364–65 (Fed. Cir. 2009), the Federal Circuit spoke of the Bilski case as setting forth "this court's clear statements that the 'sole,' 'definitive,' 'applicable,' 'governing,' and 'proper' test for a process claim under § 101 is the Supreme Court's machine-or-transformation test."

The decision of the Federal Circuit in In re Bilski was appealed to the Supreme Court of the United States as Bilski v. Kappos. Although the SCOTUS affirmed the judgment of the CAFC, it revised many aspects of the CAFC's methodology. More specifically the majority in its decision rejected the machine-or-transformation test as the sole test of process patent eligibility based on an interpretation of the language of § 101. The majority, however, had high praise for the Federal Circuit opinions, advising that "[s]tudents of patent law would be well advised to study these scholarly opinions."

== Background and prior history ==
The applicants (Bernard L. Bilski and Rand Warsaw) filed a patent application (on 10 April 1997) for a method of hedging risks in commodities trading via a fixed bill system. Such patent claims are often termed business method claims.

The serial number for the patent application is 08/833,892. The text is available on the USPTO web site. The patent application describes a method for providing a fixed bill energy contract to consumers. Under fixed bill energy contracts, consumers pay monthly prices for their future energy consumption in advance of winter based on their past energy use. The monthly prices remain the same no matter how much energy they then use. Thus, consumers save money relative to others if, for example, a given winter is unusually cold and they use an unusually large amount of energy for heating. On the other hand, consumers pay more than others if a winter is unusually warm and their energy use is lower than average.

Method claim 1 of the patent application claims a three-step method for a broker to hedge risks for purchaser-users of an input of a product or service (termed a commodity). For example, an electric power plant might be a purchaser and user of coal, which it purchases from coal-mining companies (producer-sellers) and uses to make electricity. The power plant might seek to insulate itself from upward changes in the price of coal by engaging in "hedging" transactions. The risk can be quantified in terms of dollars (termed a "risk position"). Thus, if the purchaser-user uses 1000 tons of coal in a given period, and the potential price spike is $10 per ton, the purchaser-user's total risk position for that period is 1000 × $10, or $10,000.

The claimed process comprises these steps (simplified for easier readability):

1. initiating a series of sales or options transactions between a broker and purchaser-users by which the purchaser-users buy the commodity at a first fixed rate based on historical price levels;
2. identifying producer-sellers of the commodity; and
3. initiating a series of sales or options transactions between the broker and producer-sellers, at a second fixed rate, such that the purchasers' and sellers' respective risk positions balance out.

The patent examiner rejected all 11 of the claims on the grounds that "the invention is not implemented on a specific apparatus and merely manipulates [an] abstract idea and solves a purely mathematical problem without any limitation to a practical application, therefore, the invention is not directed to the technological arts."

The applicants appealed the rejection to the Board of Patent Appeals and Interferences (BPAI), which affirmed the rejection, although on different grounds. The Board held that the examiner erred to the extent he relied on a "technological arts" test because the case law does not support such a test. Further, the Board held that the requirement of a specific apparatus was also erroneous because a claim that does not recite a specific apparatus may still be directed to patent-eligible subject matter "if there is a transformation of physical subject matter from one state to another." The Board concluded that Applicants' claims did not involve any patent-eligible transformation, holding that transformation of "non-physical financial risks and legal liabilities of the commodity provider, the consumer, and the market participants" is not patent-eligible subject matter. The Board also held that Applicants' claims "preempt[] any and every possible way of performing the steps of the [claimed process], by human or by any kind of machine or by any combination thereof," and thus concluded that they only claim an abstract idea ineligible for patent protection. Finally, the Board held that Applicants' process as claimed did not produce a "useful, concrete and tangible result," and for this reason as well was not drawn to patent-eligible subject matter.

The applicants appealed the rejection to the Federal Circuit. The case was argued before a panel of the court on October 1, 2007. The court then ordered an en banc rehearing sua sponte, which was held on May 8, 2008. The Federal Circuit issued its decision on October 30, 2008.

== Majority opinion ==
The en banc Federal Circuit upheld the rejection, 9–3. The majority opinion by Chief Judge Paul Redmond Michel characterized the issue as whether the claimed method is a patent-eligible "process," as the patent statute (35 U.S.C. § 101) uses that term. While any series of actions or operations is a process in the dictionary sense of that term, the court explained, the Supreme Court has held that the statutory meaning is narrower than the dictionary meaning which "forecloses a purely literal reading." Patent-eligible processes do not include "laws of nature, natural phenomena, [or] abstract ideas." The limiting legal principle applies not just to processes, but to anything on which a patent is sought. As a trilogy of Supreme Court decisions on patent-eligibility from approximately three decades ago had taught, "Phenomena of nature, though just discovered, mental processes, and abstract intellectual concepts are not patentable, as they are the basic tools of scientific and technological work." Therefore, the question was whether Bilski's process fell within any of the prohibited categories (that is, was a claim to a "principle"), and the underlying legal question was what legal tests or criteria should govern that determination when a claim is directed to a principle.

The court concluded that prior decisions of the Supreme Court were of limited usefulness as guides because they represented polar cases on the abstraction and concreteness spectrum. Nonetheless, a legal test could be distilled from them: "A claimed process is surely patent-eligible under § 101 if: (1) it is tied to a particular machine or apparatus, or (2) it transforms a particular article into a different state or thing." Not only did the patent-eligibility trilogy (Benson, Flook, and Diehr) support this test, the court explained, but so too did earlier Supreme Court precedents dating back well into the 19th century.

The court then considered whether this two-branch test should be considered all-inclusive, that is, as stating indispensable conditions of patent-eligibility. It concluded that the answer was affirmative, even though much of the language in the Supreme Court's patent-eligibility trilogy was more reserved.

The Federal Circuit placed great weight on the use of the definite article in several Supreme Court statements that transformation and use of a particular machine provided "the clue to the patentability of a process claim." At the same time the court placed no weight on the fact that the Benson Court had not accepted the Government's argument that the case law "cannot be rationalized otherwise."

The Federal Circuit observed that two caveats exist to the transformation-machine test: (1) a field-of-use limitation is insufficient to avoid the prohibition against pre-emption, as Flook expressly held; and (2) conventional or obvious "insignificant post-solution activity" does not make what is otherwise a claim to a principle patent-eligible (again referring to Flook). The court added that insignificant pre-solution activity (such as data-gathering) is equally ineffective, and so too is an insignificant step in the middle of a process (such as recording a result).

The court then rejected other proposed tests of patent-eligibility that had been suggested since the Supreme Court's trilogy. Several Federal Circuit panel decisions had held that a process was patent-eligible if it produced "a useful, concrete, and tangible result" — such as the transformation of financial data from one form to another form. Thus, in the State Street Bank v. Signature Financial Group case the court had upheld a patent on a tax-avoidance scheme under this standard. The court now recognized that this test is "inadequate," as a dissenting Supreme Court opinion had already stated, and therefore backed away from the language, denying that the Federal Circuit had ever "intended to supplant the Supreme Court's test." The court did not, however, expressly hold that State Street should be overruled: it merely dropped a footnote stating that "those portions of our opinions in State Street and AT&T relying solely on a 'useful, concrete and tangible result' analysis should no longer be relied on."

The court next turned to the "technological arts" test (a patent-eligible advance must be "technological" in nature) and rejected it on several grounds: The meanings of "technological arts" and "technology" are disputed and ambiguous. No court has ever adopted the test. The technological-arts test is not an equivalent of or "shortcut," the court insisted, that can be used instead of the transformation-machine test. "Rather, the machine-or-transformation test is the only applicable test and must be applied, in light of the guidance provided by the Supreme Court and this court, when evaluating the patent-eligibility of process claims."

On the other hand, the court refused to adopt a test that barred business methods, under that rubric, from patent-eligibility. Also, while the court stated that the machine-or-transformation test was the applicable test, the Supreme Court in Benson had stated that there could be cases where a claim that fails the "requirements of [its] prior precedents" may still nonetheless be patent-eligible subject matter. Benson, 409 U.S. at 71. Similarly, software could not categorically be excluded. The court also stated that future developments may alter the standing or the application of the test.

=== Bilski's method ===
Turning finally to Bilski's method, the court held it patent-ineligible. First, the court said, Bilski did not argue that the rejected claims recited any specific or "particular" machine, so that the court found it unnecessary to decide any issues relating to the machine-implementation branch of the test. "We leave to future cases the elaboration of the precise contours of machine implementation, as well as the answers to particular questions, such as whether or when recitation of a computer suffices to tie a process claim to a particular machine." Second, the court turned to transformation of articles from one thing or state to another. What is an "article"? Benson had made it clear that tanning hides, smelting ores, and vulcanizing rubber were all instances of transforming articles. This corresponded to the transformation test as the PTO and some amici curiae articulated it: one physical substance is transformed into a second physical substance. But what of electronic signals and electronically manipulated data? Or even more abstract constructs such as legal obligations, which the Bilski case involved? No Supreme Court precedents addressed such entities.

Some Federal Circuit decisions, however, had held some transformations of signals and data patent-eligible. For example, the Abele decision approved a dependent claim to a method transforming X-ray attenuation data produced in a X-Y field by an X-ray tomographic scanner to an image of body organs and bones — while at the same time the Abele court rejected a more generic and abstract independent claim to a process of graphically displaying variances from their average values of unspecified data obtained in an unspecified manner. The court said that this kind of difference between the two claims was critical to patent-eligibility. The dependent claim, unlike the independent claim, involved signal data representing tangible physical objects, which were electronically manipulated to provide a screen image of the physical objects. But Bilski's process had nothing to do with such a procedure. Like State Street, Bilski involved manipulation of financial data.

Bilski's method claim was patent-ineligible because it did not "transform any article to a different state or thing." Legal obligations (such as options and futures contracts) and business risks "cannot meet the test because they are not physical objects or substances, and they are not representative of physical objects or substances." Moreover, to the extent that signals are involved and are transformed, they are not "representative of any physical object or substance." Accordingly, Bilski's claim entirely failed the transformation-machine test.

== Concurrences and dissents ==
=== Concurrence by Judge Dyk ===
Judge Dyk, joined by Judge Linn, concurred in the majority opinion upholding the PTO's rejection of Bilski's patent, but concurred also in Judge Mayer's historical analysis that the framers of the Constitution intended to exclude from the operation of the US patent system "methods for organizing human activity that do not involve manufactures, machines, or compositions of matter." Since Bilski's method failed that test, it is patent-ineligible.

=== Dissent by Judge Mayer ===
Judge Mayer dissented, first, on the ground that the majority opinion failed to overrule State Street explicitly. Whether this should be done was a question that the court had asked to be briefed on the re-argument. "I would answer that question with an emphatic 'yes.'" He then moved to the major thrust of his dissent: business-method patents are unconstitutional, or the patent statute must be interpreted not to extend to them in order to avoid unconstitutionality. He maintained:

The patent system is intended to protect and promote advances in science and technology, not ideas about how to structure commercial transactions. Claim 1 of the application . . . is not eligible for patent protection because it is directed to a method of conducting business. Affording patent protection to business methods lacks constitutional and statutory support, serves to hinder rather than promote innovation and usurps that which rightfully belongs in the public domain. State Street and AT&T should be overruled.

Pointing to the Statute of Monopolies and the public hostility to the "odious monopolies," he concluded that when Congress enacted the first patent statute (in language substantially unchanged to this day in regard to patent-eligibility), Congress did not want the system to allow patents on methods of conducting trade. State Street was a grave error. "Before State Street led us down the wrong path, this court had rightly concluded that patents were designed to protect technological innovations, not ideas about the best way to run a business."

Judge Mayer also criticized the majority opinion for doing nothing to remedy the ills of a "patent system [that] has run amok," for evading crucial issues, and for failing to enlighten users of the patent system in regard to

three of the thorniest issues in the patentability thicket: (1) the continued viability of business method patents, (2) what constitutes sufficient physical transformation or machine-implementation to render a process patentable, and (3) the extent to which computer software and computer-implemented processes constitute statutory subject matter.

=== Dissent by Judge Rader ===
Judge Rader dissented on the ground that the majority should have "said in a single sentence: 'Because Bilski claims merely an abstract idea, this court affirms the Board's rejection.'" He then complained that instead of doing that, the majority opinion

propagates unanswerable questions: What form or amount of "transformation" suffices? When is a "representative" of a physical object sufficiently linked to that object to satisfy the transformation test? (E.g., Does only vital sign data taken directly from a patient qualify, or can population data derived in part from statistics and extrapolation be used?) What link to a machine is sufficient to invoke the "or machine" prong? Are the "specific" machines of Benson required, or can a general purpose computer qualify? What constitutes "extra-solution activity?" If a process may meet eligibility muster as a "machine," why does the Act "require" a machine link for a "process" to show eligibility?

Judge Rader indicated his belief that nothing is wrong with patents on business methods or natural phenomena, so long as they are claimed to "achieve a useful, tangible, and concrete result." In his view, the LabCorp dissent's criticism of that test, and of business method patents generally, misses the point of the needs of 21st century innovation and entrepreneurship.

=== Dissent by Judge Newman ===
Judge Newman dissented on the ground that the PTO should have allowed Bilski's patent. The opinion largely constitutes a debate with Judge Dyk's concurrence about whether the Statute of Monopolies, common law precedents, and the widespread opposition to the "odious monopolies" led to a ban on business-method patents in the US. Judge Newman insists that "[i]t is inconceivable that on this background the Framers, and again the enactors of the first United States patent statutes in 1790 and 1793, intended sub silentio to impose the limitations on 'process' now created by this court."

In short, Judge Newman felt that the current definition of the word process used by the court directly contradicted the statute, the precedent, and the constitutional mandate to promote the useful arts and science. Because the court's decision could affect thousands of patents already granted, Newman warned of uncertainty in patent eligible matter which serves as a disincentive to innovation.

== Impact ==
Prior to the Supreme Court's decision on appeal, it was widely reported that the Bilski decision would call into question the validity of many already issued business method patents. This issue has received global news coverage with a generally favorable assessment of the judgment. According to the Associated Press, the decision "could reshape the way banks and high-tech firms protect their intellectual property." Moreover, as a result of the decision, according to The Washington Post and others, many business method patents, possibly thousands, may now be invalid.

Subsequent decisions by the BPAI used Bilski to reject claims related to more traditional computer implemented inventions. Four out of five of the initial rejections based on Bilski, for example, involved IBM patent applications not in the business method area.

In January 2009, Bilski and Warsaw petitioned the U.S. Supreme Court for a writ of certiorari, seeking to overturn the Federal Circuit decision. It was granted on June 1, 2009. (This eventually led to the Supreme Court's decision in Bilski v. Kappos.)

In March 2009, a Federal Circuit panel split over what Bilski had held. In In re Ferguson the majority opinion (per Judge Gajarsa, joined by Judge Mayer) stated that Bilski has held that the "useful, concrete and tangible result test" "is insufficient to determine whether a claim is patent-eligible under § 101," that it "is inadequate," and that "those portions of our opinions in State Street and AT&T Corp. v. Excel Communications, Inc. relying on a 'useful, concrete and tangible result' analysis should not longer be relied on." In addition, the Ferguson majority said, "In Bilski, this court also rejected the so-called Freeman-Walter-Abele Test, the "technological arts" test, and the "physical steps" test." In her dissenting opinion, Judge Newman took issue with the majority opinion as an erroneous "sweeping rejection of precedent." She insisted that Bilski had left State Street partly in effect. She argued that Bilski had "recognized that the State Street Bank test was directed to processes performed by computer, "thus meeting the Bilski test" and pointed to note 18 of the Bilski opinion, which stated, "In State Street, as is often forgotten, we addressed a claim drawn not to a process but to a machine."

A March 2009 district court opinion interpreting Bilski "ponder[ed] whether the end has arrived for business method patents." The court then observed:

Without expressly overruling State Street, the Bilski majority struck down its underpinnings. This caused one dissenter, Judge Newman, to write that State Street "is left hanging," while another dissenter, Judge Mayer, registered "an emphatic 'yes'" to rejecting State Street.... Although the majority declined to say so explicitly, Bilski's holding suggests a perilous future for most business method patents.

The court concluded, "The closing bell may be ringing for business method patents, and their patentees may find they have become bagholders."

While the Supreme Court's opinion in Bilski v. Kappos, affirming the judgment but limiting the scope of the machine-or-transformation test, largely superseded the Federal Circuit's Bilski opinion as a precedent, nonetheless, much of the substantive content of the Federal Circuit majority opinion is repeated and found in the Supreme Court's Bilski opinion and subsequently in Alice as well. The statistics on invalidations under § 101, show that, as of June 2015, "the 73.1% invalidity rate in the federal courts breaks down into 70.2% (66 of 96) in the district courts and a stunning 92.9% in the Federal Circuit (13 for 14)." At the same time, final rejections of business-method patent claims before the PTO "soared into the 90% range."
