= Mozilla Open Software Patent License =

Open source software license

- Author: Mozilla Foundation
- Latest version: 1.1
- Publisher: Mozilla Foundation
- Published: January 3, 2012
- Website: www.mozilla.org/en-US/about/policy/patents/license/

The Mozilla Open Software Patent License (MOSPL) is a permissive patent license developed and maintained by the Mozilla Foundation.
