= LabCorp v. Metabolite, Inc. =

LabCorp of Am. Holdings v. Metabolite Labs., Inc.
- Supreme Court of the United States

Argued March 21, 2006 Decided June 22, 2006
- Full case name: Laboratory Corporation of America Holdings (d/b/a LabCorp) v. Metabolite Laboratories, Inc. et al.
- Docket no.: 03-1120
- Citations: 548 U.S. 124 (more) 126 S. Ct. 2921; 165 L. Ed. 2d 399; 79 U.S.P.Q.2d (BNA) 1065
- Argument: Oral argument
- Opinion announcement: Opinion announcement

Case history
- Prior: Judgment for plaintiff, judgment as a matter of law for defendant denied, Metabolite Labs, Inc. v. Lab. Corp. of Am. Holdings, No. 1:99-cv-00870 (D. Colo. 2002); 370 F.3d 1354 (Fed. Cir. 2004), cert. granted, 546 U.S. 999 (2005).
- Subsequent: Lab. Corp. of Am. Holdings v. Metabolite Labs., Inc., 571 F. Supp. 2d 1199 (D. Colo. 2008) (partial relitigation); 599 F.3d 1277 (Fed. Cir. 2010) (denying jurisdiction and transferring appeal); 410 F. App'x 151 (10th Cir. 2011) (affirming summary judgment).

Holding
- Writ of certiorari dismissed as improvidently granted.

Court membership
- Chief Justice John Roberts Associate Justices John P. Stevens · Antonin Scalia; Anthony Kennedy · David Souter; Clarence Thomas · Ruth Bader Ginsburg; Stephen Breyer · Samuel Alito

Case opinions
- Per curiam
- Dissent: Breyer, joined by Souter, Stevens

LabCorp v. Metabolite, Inc., 548 U.S. 124 (2006), is the first case since Diamond v. Chakrabarty in which the U.S. Supreme Court indicated a renewed interest in examining the limits of patentable subject matter for advances in life sciences. Although the Court initially agreed to hear the case, it was later dismissed in 2006 with three Justices dissenting. The defendant's petition to the Supreme Court raised an issue not addressed in opinions from the lower courts: the claim at issue was directed to patent ineligible subject matter and therefore invalid.

== Background ==
In 1999, Metabolite sued LabCorp for infringement of a patent covering a diagnostic test. The single claim at issue, claim 13, is reproduced in full below: "A method for detecting a deficiency of cobalamin or folate in warm-blooded animals comprising the steps of: "assaying a body fluid for an elevated level of total homocysteine; and "correlating an elevated level of total homocysteine in said body fluid with a deficiency of cobalamin or folate."

Claim 13 is a diagnostic method for detecting deficiencies of vitamins B_{6} and B_{12} that relies on the correlation of that condition with elevated levels of homocysteine. The claim instructs medical providers to test homocysteine levels in a patient, without specifying any specific means of doing so, and make logical inferences based on the test results and aware of the discovered correlation between elevated levels and vitamin deficiencies.

A jury found the defendants liable for indirect infringement of claim 13 and breach of contract. The district court ordered LabCorp to pay $4.7 million in damages and permanently enjoined LabCorp from conducting future such tests at physicians' requests. The decision was upheld by the United States Court of Appeals for the Federal Circuit, which further stated that doctors were 'directly infringing' Metabolite's patents each time such a test is ordered and interpreted. LabCorp argued that the correlation is a principle of nature, and therefore the patent should never have been granted.

== Dissent ==
The US Supreme Court dismissed the case, although Justice Breyer, Justice Stevens, and Justice Souter dissented from this decision. Breyer's dissenting opinion cited numerous cases in which scientific and mathematical principles had been held to be patent ineligible, including O'Reilly v. Morse and Gottschalk v. Benson.

== Significance ==
Had the case been heard, and had Metabolite's patent been invalidated, the case would have had broad implications for biotechnology companies, which may have extended far beyond patentability of correlations of biomarkers to disease states. Lori Andrews outlined various concerns regarding how routine academic practices might become actionable under the results of the case. Metabolite's brief to the court suggested that overturning the patent might lead to invalidation of all drug patents on the grounds that the inventors "merely discovered that certain chemicals interact with the human body in ways directed by chemistry." This statement is flawed, because it refers to process claims, while pharmaceutical are claimed as compositions-of-matter.

In Mayo v. Prometheus in 2012 the Supreme Court unanimously held what the dissenting Justices argued for in this case. That did not lead, however, to invalidation of all drug patents on the grounds that the inventors "merely discovered that certain chemicals interact with the human body in ways directed by chemistry." The only issue affected by Mayo v. Prometeus is the eligibility of method/process claims. Claims on articles of manufacture or compositions of matter are believed to be unaffected.

== See also ==
- Diamond v. Diehr
- Parker v. Flook
- Funk Brothers Seed Co. v. Kalo Inoculant Co.
- Medical technologist
- Valid claim
