= Piano roll blues =

Legal argument about software patents

The piano roll blues or old piano roll blues is a figure of speech designating a legal argument (or the response to that argument) made in US patent law relating to computer software. The argument is that a newly programmed general-purpose digital computer is a "new" machine and, accordingly, properly the subject of a US patent.

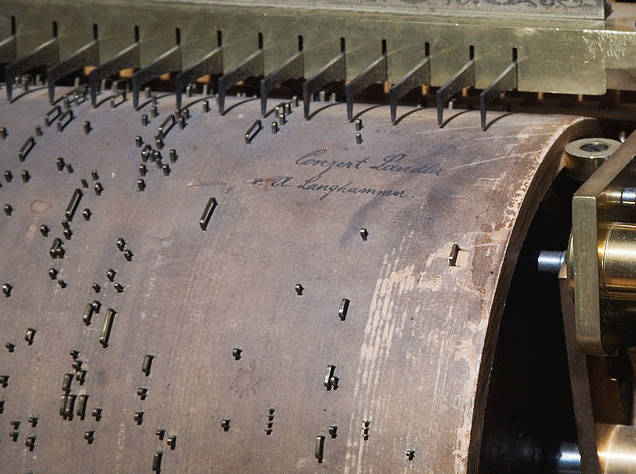
Detail of player piano roll being operated by player piano, turning player piano into a "new and different machine"

This legal argument was made in Gottschalk v. Benson in Benson's brief. The government then responded in its brief that this amounted to asserting that inserting a new piano roll into an existing player piano converted the old player piano into a new player piano. After Benson, the Court of Customs and Patent Appeals took the position that the reasoning of Benson did not apply to "machine" claims, such as a claim to a conventional digital computer programmed to carry out a new algorithm or computer program. In dissenting from that judgment on the grounds that the Supreme Court in Benson did not limit the principle to method claims, Judge Rich spoke of "the legal doctrine that a new program makes an old general purpose digital computer into a new and different machine." Id. at 773. He observed that the doctrine "partakes of the nature of a legal fiction when it comes to drafting claims." Id.

The argument appeared again two decades later in the majority opinion in In re Alappat, and in his dissenting opinion in that case Chief Judge Archer discussed the figure of speech extensively, concluding:

Yet a player piano playing Chopin's scales does not become a "new machine" when it spins a roll to play Brahms' lullaby. The distinction between the piano before and after different rolls are inserted resides not in the piano's changing quality as a "machine" but only in the changing melodies being played by the one machine. The only invention by the creator of a roll that is new because of its music is the new music.

Despite a strong indication in the Supreme Court's Gottschalk v. Benson opinion that computer implementation of an otherwise patent-ineligible abstract idea (in that case a mathematical algorithm) was insufficient to transform the idea into patent-eligible subject matter, the Federal Circuit continued sporadically to assert the piano roll blues argument. A very recent example was in a dissenting opinion of Chief Judge Rader in 2013.

The Supreme Court's opinion in the Alice case may have finally put a stop to the piano roll blues argument, since it states that simply saying "apply it with a computer" will not transform a patent-ineligible claim to an idea into a patent-eligible claim.

The expression apparently derives from a song popular in the 1950s—"The Old Piano Roll Blues" by Cy Coben — in the style of a Scott Joplin rag. As Judge Archer points out in his Alappat dissent, there is also an allusion to the decision of the Supreme Court in White-Smith v. Apollo, concerning copyright protection for piano rolls.
