= Valid claim =

A valid or colorable claim in law is a claim that is strong enough to have a reasonable chance of being determined both valid based upon its being sufficiently supported by law and provable fact to be plausibly proved in court.

== In United States law ==
The term "valid claim" is used in a number of different contexts in federal law. Under United States bankruptcy law, a creditor must have a valid claim in order to attend a creditors' meeting and collect all or part of a debt. Under United States patent law, a valid claim is a claim of an issued and unexpired, legally enforceable patent.

"Valid claim" is also the terminology used to describe beneficial interest in antiquities under the 1990 Native American Graves Protection and Repatriation Act.

== Liens ==
A lien must be based on a valid claim. Under Texas law, a mechanic's lien must have a valid basis. Under New York law, a lis pendens, or notice of pendency of a claim against real property, must be valid, such as a pending divorce lawsuit. Under the laws of most US states, a claim against an estate must be proven or validated.

== See also ==
- Federal Tort Claims Act
- Replevin
