= Board of Patent Appeals and Interferences =

Former United States agency

The Board of Patent Appeals and Interferences (BPAI) was an administrative law body of the United States Patent and Trademark Office (USPTO) which decided issues of patentability. Under the America Invents Act, the BPAI was replaced with the Patent Trial and Appeal Board (PTAB), effective September 16, 2012.

== Structure ==
The BPAI was primarily made up of an Appeals Division and a Trial Division. The Appeals Division, with over 100 Administrative Patent Judges, handled appeals of patent examiner rejections, with sections adjudicating different technology areas. The Trial Division, with 11 Administrative Patent Judges as of 2008, handled contested cases or interference proceedings. The BPAI was headed by a Chief Administrative Patent Judge with a Vice Chief. As of mid-2013, the Chief Administrative Patent Judge was James Donald Smith.

== Procedures ==
An applicant could appeal the examiner's decision to the BPAI. The appeal procedure was described in chapter 1200 of the U.S. Manual of Patent Examining Procedure (MPEP). Typically, appeals to the BPAI were conducted ex parte. Decisions of the BPAI were typically rendered as an opinion.

== Appeals ==
Decisions of the BPAI could be further appealed to the United States Court of Appeals for the Federal Circuit (CAFC) under 35 U.S.C. § 141. The decisions of the CAFC may also be reviewed on a discretionary basis by the United States Supreme Court. The U.S. Supreme Court is the ultimate authority on the judicial standards for patentability.

The United States Congress, however, can change the patent laws and thus override a decision of the Supreme Court.

An alternative path was a civil action against the Director of the United States Patent and Trademark Office in the U.S. District Court for the District of Columbia under 35 U.S.C. § 145. Any appeal arising from such a case would then be directed to the CAFC under 28 U.S.C. § 1295.

== Constitutionality ==
In 2007, Professor John F. Duffy, a widely recognized patent law scholar, argued that, since 2000, the process of appointing judges to the BPAI has been unconstitutional, because the judges were appointed by the Director of the U.S. Patent and Trademark Office rather than by the Secretary of Commerce (a "Head of Department" under the Appointments clause of the Constitution). This problem has since been rectified and current Administrative Patent Judges are appointed by the Secretary of Commerce.

== See also ==
- Appeal procedure before the European Patent Office
- Ex parte Gutta (2009)
- Trademark Trial and Appeal Board (TTAB)
