= Bilski v. Kappos =

- Supreme Court of the United States

Argued November 9, 2009 Decided June 28, 2010
- Full case name: Bernard L. Bilski and Rand A. Warsaw v. David J. Kappos, Under Secretary of Commerce for Intellectual Property and Director, Patent and Trademark Office
- Docket no.: 08-964
- Citations: 561 U.S. 593 (more) 130 S. Ct. 3218; 177 L. Ed. 2d 792; 2010 U.S. LEXIS 5521; 78 USLW 4802; 2010-1 USTC P 50,481; 95 U.S.P.Q. (BNA) 1001; 10 Cal. Daily Op. Serv. 7966; 2010 Daily Journal D.A.R. 9848; 22 Fla. L. Weekly Fed. S 703

Case history
- Prior: In re Bilski, 545 F.3d 943, (Fed. Cir. 2008) (judgment affirmed)

Holding
- The machine-or-transformation test is not the sole test for determining the patent eligibility of a process, but rather a useful tool. Bilski's application, seeking a patent on a method for hedging risk in the commodities market, did not draw to patent eligible subject matter.

Court membership
- Chief Justice John Roberts Associate Justices John P. Stevens · Antonin Scalia; Anthony Kennedy · Clarence Thomas; Ruth Bader Ginsburg · Stephen Breyer; Samuel Alito · Sonia Sotomayor

Case opinions
- Majority: Kennedy, joined by Roberts, Thomas, Alito; Scalia (except Parts II–B–2 and II–C–2)
- Concurrence: Stevens (in judgment), joined by Ginsburg, Breyer, Sotomayor
- Concurrence: Breyer (in judgment), joined by Scalia (Part II)

Laws applied
- 35 U.S.C. § 101

Bilski v. Kappos, 561 U.S. 593 (2010), was a case decided by the Supreme Court of the United States holding that the machine-or-transformation test is not the sole test for determining the patent eligibility of a process, but rather "a useful and important clue, an investigative tool, for determining whether some claimed inventions are processes under § 101." In so doing, the Supreme Court affirmed the rejection of an application for a patent on a method of hedging losses in one segment of the energy industry by making investments in other segments of that industry, on the basis that the abstract investment strategy set forth in the application was not patentable subject matter.

== Majority opinion ==
The Court affirmed the judgment of the Federal Circuit in In re Bilski, the case below. However, it rejected the machine-or-transformation test as a sole test of patentability based on an interpretation of the language of § 101. The Court rejected the Federal Circuit's statutory interpretation regarding the word "process", finding the definition in § 100(b) to be sufficient without turning to the canon of noscitur a sociis. Section 100(b) defines process as a "process, art or method, and includes a new use of a known process, machine, manufacture, composition of matter, or material".

The Court looked to Gottschalk v. Benson and Parker v. Flook, and noted that both had explicitly refused to rely on the machine-or-transformation test as the sole test for patent eligibility.

The Court also rejected a categorical exclusion of business method patents from eligibility, reasoning that the definition of "process" in § 100(b) includes the word "method", which appears to comprehend some forms of business method patents. 35 U.S.C. § 273(b)(1) also provides as a defense to patent infringement prior use of a "method of conducting or doing business". By acknowledging the defense, the statute also acknowledged the possibility of business method patents.

Regarding Bilski's claimed subject matter, the Court found that his method of optimizing a fixed bill system for energy markets was an unpatentable abstract idea. Despite taking a broader reading of patent eligibility for processes, according to the majority opinion "this Court by no means desires to preclude the Federal Circuit’s development of other limiting criteria that further the Patent Act’s purposes and are not inconsistent with its text."

In the plurality sections of Kennedy's opinion, an overall Court minority opinion as not joined by Scalia, he notes that strict adherence to only "the machine-or-transformation test would create uncertainty as to the patentability of software, advanced diagnostic medicine techniques, and inventions based on linear programming, data compression, and the manipulation of digital signals" but "the Court today is not commenting on the patentability of any particular invention, let alone holding that any of the above-mentioned technologies from the Information Age should or should not receive patent protection." Kennedy also suggests that a categorical exclusion of some types of business methods from patent eligibility might be legitimate if that rule was based on the idea that purely abstract ideas are not patentable.

== Concurrences ==
The holding of the Court was unanimous, but there were two concurring opinions, and no single opinion commanded a majority of the Court as to all parts.

=== Stevens' concurrence ===
Justice Stevens' concurrence, joined by Justices Ginsburg, Breyer, and Sotomayor, argues that the majority interpret the term "process" too broadly. Stevens rejected the majority's reliance on the mention of the word "method" in 35 U.S.C. § 273(b), saying that the statute, originally known as the First Inventors Defense Act of 1999, was only passed by Congress in response to the confusion created by State Street Bank v. Signature Financial Group. 149 F.3d 1368 (Fed. Cir. 1998). He would categorically exclude business methods from patentability, as they have not traditionally been patentable in the U.S., despite significant innovations in business methods.

It was the final opinion in Stevens' 35-year career on the Supreme Court. His retirement became effective the next day.

=== Breyer's concurrence ===
Justice Breyer's concurrence began by agreeing with Justice Stevens "that a 'general method of engaging in business transactions' is not a patentable 'process'". In a second part, joined by Justice Scalia, Breyer highlighted four points which he felt were consistent with both the opinion of the Court and Justice Stevens' concurring opinion:

1. that although the law's description of what is patentable in §101 "is broad, it is not without limit";
2. the Court has repeatedly stated that "transformation and reduction of an article to a different state or thing is the clue to the patentability of a process claim that does not include particular machines";
3. "while the machine-or-transformation test has always been a 'useful and important clue', it has never been the 'sole test' for determining patentability";
4. "although the machine-or-transformation test is not the only test for patentability, this by no means indicates that anything which produces a 'useful, concrete, and tangible result' [as held in State Street Bank v. Signature Financial Group] is patentable."

Part II sums up by stating "it is my view that, in reemphasizing that the 'machine-or-transformation' test is not necessarily the sole test of patentability, the Court intends neither to de-emphasize the test's usefulness nor to suggest that many patentable processes lie beyond its reach."

== Impact ==
The Court's opinion in this case is seen as moderating the machine-or-transformation test requirement instated by the Federal Circuit in In re Bilski, while also leaving little guidance as to what should be considered patentable under § 101. "[T]he outcome from the decision might be best stated as 'business as usual'."

In light of the decision in Bilski v. Kappos, the Supreme Court granted judicial review, vacated the decisions of the Federal Circuit, and remanded to the Federal Circuit for reconsideration the cases of Mayo Collaborative Services v. Prometheus Laboratories, Inc. and Classen Immunotherapies, Inc. v. Biogen Idec. The two claims related to medical diagnostics, and the claims in Prometheus were found patentable under the machine-or-transformation test while the claims in Classen were not. In December 2010, the Federal Circuit applied the broad eligibility of Bilski in Research Corp. Technologies v. Microsoft Corp., which upheld the patent eligibility of a process for digital image halftoning.

Patent examiners and practitioners were given interim instructions on the interpretation of Bilski v. Kappos both during the appeal process (on August 29, 2009) and shortly after the decision (on July 27, 2010) in documents issued by the USPTO.

== See also ==
- In re Bilski
- Stanford v. Roche
- CyberSource Corp. v. Retail Decisions, Inc.
- List of United States Supreme Court cases, volume 561
