= Limitations on exclusive rights: Computer programs =

Limitations on exclusive rights: Computer programs is the title of the current form of section 117 of the U.S. Copyright Act (17 U.S.C. § 117). In the United States copyright law, provides users with certain adaptation rights for computer software that they own.

== Background ==
The current form of section 117 is the result of a recommendation by CONTU, the National Commission on New Technological Uses of Copyrighted Works. The U.S. Congress established CONTU to study and make recommendations on modifying the 1976 Copyright Act to deal with new technologies, particularly computer software, that Congress had not addressed when it passed the 1976 Act. CONTU operated from 1975 to 1978, and its principal recommendation to Congress was to revise the wording of section 117. Its report stated:

Because the placement of a work into a computer is the preparation of a copy, the law should provide that persons in rightful possession of copies of programs be able to use them freely without fear of exposure to copyright liability. Obviously, creators, lessors, licensors, and vendors of copies of programs intend that they be used by their customers, so that rightful users would but rarely need a legal shield against potential copyright problems. It is easy to imagine, however, a situation in which the copyright owner might desire, for good reason or none at all, to force a lawful owner or possessor of a copy to stop using a particular program. One who rightfully possesses a copy of a program, therefore, should be provided with a legal right to copy it to that extent which will permit its use by that possessor. This would include the right to load it into a computer and to prepare archival copies of it to guard against destruction or damage by mechanical or electrical failure. But this permission would not extend to other copies of the program. Thus, one could not, for example, make archival copies of a program and later sell some while retaining some for use. The sale of a copy of a program by a rightful possessor to another must be of all rights in the program, thus creating a new rightful possessor and destroying that status as regards the seller.

The revisions recommended by CONTU were approved with one important change. Instead of "rightful possessor" of a computer program Congress used the word "owner" of a computer program. It is not clear why this change was made. This one change resulted in a state of affairs in which software vendors began to take the position that customers do not own their software but rather only "license" it. The courts have split on whether the assertion in software agreements that the customer does not own the software, and has only a right to use it in accordance with the license agreement, is legally enforceable.

== Users' rights under § 117 ==
Section 117 is a limitation on the rights granted to holders of copyright on computer programs. The limitation allows the owner of a particular copy of a copyrighted computer program to make copies or adaptations of the program for any of several reasons:

1. Utilization of the program. The user is allowed to install the software to his hard disk and run the software in random-access memory.
2. Making backup and archival copies. The user is allowed to make copies of the software to protect himself from loss in the event of the original distribution media being damaged.
3. Making copies of software in order to repair or maintain machines, provided that the copies used in repairing the machine is destroyed after the repair or maintenance is complete.

The law allows any copies that are created for the above purposes to be transferred when the software is sold, only along with the copy made to prepare them. Adaptations made can not be transferred without permission from the copyright holder.

== Reverse engineering ==
While it is not part of section 117, it is also lawful to reverse engineer software for compatibility purposes. Sec. 103(f) of the DMCA (17 U.S.C. § 1201 (f)) says that a person who is in legal possession of a program, is permitted to reverse-engineer and circumvent its protection against copying if this is necessary in order to achieve "interoperability" - a term broadly covering other devices and programs being able to interact with it, make use of it, and to use and transfer data to and from it, in useful ways. A limited exemption exists that allows the knowledge thus gained to be shared and used for interoperability purposes.

More generally, it has been held that reverse engineering is a fair use. In Sega v. Accolade, the Ninth Circuit held that making copies in the course of reverse engineering is a fair use, when it is the only way to get access to the "ideas and functional elements" in the copyrighted code, and when "there is a legitimate reason for seeking such access."

== See also ==
- Software patents under United States patent law
