= Software patents under United States patent law =

Neither software nor computer programs are explicitly mentioned in statutory United States patent law. Patent law has changed to address new technologies, and decisions of the United States Supreme Court and United States Court of Appeals for the Federal Circuit (CAFC) beginning in the latter part of the 20th century have sought to clarify the boundary between patent-eligible and patent-ineligible subject matter for a number of new technologies including computers and software. The first computer software case in the Supreme Court was Gottschalk v. Benson in 1972. Since then, the Supreme Court has decided about a half dozen cases touching on the patent eligibility of software-related inventions.

The eligibility of software, as such, for patent protection has been only scantily addressed in the courts or in legislation. In fact, in the recent Supreme Court decision in Alice v. CLS Bank, the Court painstakingly avoided the issue, and one Justice in the oral argument repeatedly insisted that it was unnecessary to reach the issue. The expression "software patent" itself has not been clearly defined. The United States Patent and Trademark Office (USPTO) has permitted patents to be issued on nothing more than a series of software computer instructions, but the latest Federal Circuit decision on the subject invalidated such a patent. The court held that software instructions as such were too intangible to fit within any of the statutory categories such as machines or articles of manufacture.

On June 19, 2014 the United States Supreme Court ruled in Alice Corp. v. CLS Bank International that "merely requiring generic computer implementation fails to transform [an] abstract idea into a patent-eligible invention."

The ruling continued:

[...] the mere recitation of a generic computer cannot transform a patent-ineligible abstract idea into a patent-eligible invention. Stating an abstract idea "while adding the words 'apply it'" is not enough for patent eligibility.[] Nor is limiting the use of an abstract idea "'to a particular technological environment.'"[]. Stating an abstract idea while adding the words "apply it with a computer" simply combines those two steps, with the same deficient result. Thus, if a patent's recitation of a computer amounts to a mere instruction to "implemen[t]" an abstract idea "on . . . a computer," [] that addition cannot impart patent eligibility.

== Law ==
=== Constitution ===
Article 1, section 8 of the United States Constitution establishes that the purpose of intellectual property is to serve a broader societal good, the promotion of "the Progress of Science and the useful Arts" :

Article 1, section 8 United States Constitution:

Congress shall have Power [. . .] To promote the Progress of Science and useful Arts, by securing for limited Times to Authors and Inventors the exclusive Right to their respective Writings and Discoveries; . . .

=== Statute ===
Section 101 of title 35, United States Code, provides:

Whoever invents or discovers any new and useful process, machine, manufacture, or composition of matter, or any new and useful improvement thereof, may obtain a patent therefor, subject to the conditions and requirements of this title.

However, there are restrictions on subject matter eligibility under Section 101 and in general the line between what is deemed patent eligible under Section 101 and what is ineligible changes is, as discussed below, a matter of ongoing judicial activity.

== History ==
During the 1960s software was not seen as patentable, while computer hardware was. To receive a patent on his software, Martin Goetz had to build what Burton Grad of the Computer History Museum later described as a "hardware-fake". In the late 1960s and early 1970s, the US Patent Office (as it was then called; the name was later changed to the US Patent and Trademark Office [PTO or USPTO]) and the United States Court of Customs and Patent Appeals (CCPA) were at odds over the patent-eligibility of technical advances whose departure from the prior art was only in the use of a software algorithm. The Office rejected such claims and declined to patent them, but the CCPA repeatedly reversed the Office's rulings and ordered the issuance of patents. The Office's position was hampered during the 1960s by the uncertainty over whether the Supreme Court could review decisions of the CCPA, because it was unclear whether it was an Article I or Article III court. That question was resolved, however, in Brenner v. Manson, in which the Court held the CCPA an Article III court and that there was certiorari jurisdiction to review CCPA decisions.

The Manson decision also began a string of decisions in which the Supreme Court reversed decisions of the CCPA, and then those of its successor court the United States Court of Appeals for the Federal Circuit (CAFC), which had reversed decisions of the Patent Office or PTO denying a patent to an applicant.

=== Benson case ===
In the first of the Supreme Court's computer software decisions (the "patent-eligibility trilogy"), Gottschalk v. Benson, the Court reversed the CCPA's reversal of a Patent Office decision, thus denying a patent on an algorithm for converting binary-coded decimal numbers into pure binary numbers. In so ruling, the Court looked back to 19th century decisions such as O'Reilly v. Morse, which held that abstract ideas could not be made the subject of patents.

=== Flook case ===
The Court's 1978 ruling in Parker v. Flook, was similar to Benson in principle. The Benson and Flook cases also established that a "clue" to whether a patent might be granted on a process was whether the process was carried out with a particular apparatus or else effectuated a transformation of an article from one state or thing to another state or thing. In Flook, where the sole departure from the prior art was concededly the formula or algorithm, no transformation was alleged, and it was conceded that the implementing apparatus was old or conventional, the process was simply not the kind of process that could be patented. The principle, stated in Flook, that to be patent eligible the implementation of an abstract idea or law of nature must be inventive, rather than routine or conventional, became of paramount importance in Supreme Court jurisprudence at the beginning of the 21st century. (This occurred in the Mayo and Alice cases.)

=== Diehr case ===
In the 1981 case of Diamond v. Diehr, the United States Supreme Court upheld the CCPA's reversal of the Patent Office, and ordered the grant of a patent on a process for curing rubber in a mold, a substantial part of which involved use of a computer program that used a well-known formula (the Arrhenius Equation) for calculating the time when rubber was cured and the mold could therefore be opened. The Supreme Court stated that in this case, the invention was not merely a mathematical algorithm, but a process for molding rubber, which used the mathematical formula for an industrial purpose, and was therefore patent eligible. In the Diehr case, there was no concession (as there was in Flook) that the implementation was conventional, and the process did effectuate a transformation of substances (from uncured rubber to cured rubber).

The Supreme Court later explained the meaning of this decision and how it actually harmonized with Benson and Flook in the Court's 2012 Mayo opinion. In the Mayo case, the Court explained that Diehr had not simply claimed the Arrhenius Equation implemented in a non-inventive machine but had instead implemented it in a way that the Diehr Court had found inventive. Under this interpretation, Diehr satisfied the requirements that the Court had earlier found not to have been met in the Flook case.

=== Pre-1994 period ===
After this point, more patents on software began to be granted, albeit with conflicting and confusing results. Patenting grew at a rate of 21% per year for high tech companies during this period. This was due in part to judicial decisions during this period that limited the scope of software copyright protection. After its creation in 1982, the Court of Appeals for the Federal Circuit (CAFC) charted a course that tried to follow the Diehr precedent. Patents were allowed only if the claim included some sort of apparatus, even rather nominal apparatus at times, such as an analog-to-digital converter front end, or in one case a scratch-pad memory for storing intermediate data. A representative decision from this period is In re Schrader, in which the CAFC set forth probably its best and most detailed formulation of the rule it was attempting to follow.

=== Alappat case ===
Dissatisfaction with the perceived artificiality of this rule erupted, however, in rulings beginning with the en banc 1994 decision in In re Alappat, in which the CAFC majority held that a novel algorithm combined with a trivial physical step constitutes a novel physical device. Therefore, a computing device on which is loaded a mathematical algorithm is a "new machine," which is patent-eligible.

This ruling was immediately preceded by In re Lowry, which held that a data structure representing information on a computer's hard drive or memory is similarly to be treated as a patent-eligible physical device, and in which the Solicitor General's Office declined the PTO's request to seek certiorari. As a result, the PTO did not even request that the Solicitor General's Office seek certiorari in the Alappat case.

=== State Street Bank case and aftermath ===
Finally, in State Street Bank v. Signature Financial Group, the CAFC ruled that a numerical calculation that produces a "useful, concrete and tangible result", such as a price, is patent-eligible.

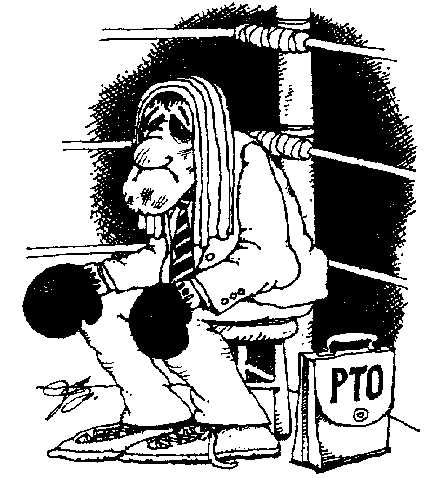
"The USPTO gets ready to throw in the towel", cartoon published in IEEE Micro in July 1995

The USPTO's reaction to this change was, for the time being at least, to "throw in the towel." The Clinton administration appointed Bruce Lehman as Commissioner of the USPTO in 1994. Unlike his predecessors, Lehman was not a patent lawyer but the chief lobbyist for the Software Publishing Industry. In 1995, the USPTO established some broad guidelines for examining and issuing software patents. The USPTO interpreted the decisions of the Federal Circuit as requiring the USPTO to grant software patents in a broad variety of circumstances. Although the U.S. Congress has never legislated specifically that software is patentable, the CAFC interpreted the broad description of patentable subject in section 101 of the Patent Act of 1952 and the failure of Congress to change the law after the CAFC decisions allowing software patents as an indication of Congressional intent. The reaction of the defeated-feeling USPTO was characterized in the cartoon shown at right, which appeared in IEEE Micro in 1995.

=== Case law after 2000 ===
The United States Supreme Court remained silent on these decisions and developments for years. The first response appeared in a dissenting opinion in LabCorp v. Metabolite, Inc. (2006). Although certiorari had been granted, the Court dismissed it as improvidently granted; the minority dissent argued that the question of statutory subject matter in patent law should be addressed. Justice Breyer's dissent stated:

[State Street] does say that a process is patentable if it produces a 'useful, concrete, and tangible result.' But this Court has never made such a statement and, if taken literally, the statement would cover instances where this Court has held the contrary.

He continues to directly address the claim that software loaded onto a computer is a physical device:

. . . And the Court [in Gottschalk v. Benson] has invalidated a patent setting forth a process that transforms, for computer-programming purposes, decimal figures into binary figures—even though the result would seem useful, concrete, and at least arguably (within the computer's wiring system) tangible.

At about the same time, in a concurring opinion in eBay Inc. v. MercExchange, L.L.C., Justice Kennedy (joined by Justices Stevens, Souter, and Breyer) questioned the wisdom of permitting injunctions in support of "the burgeoning number of patents over business methods," because of their "potential vagueness and suspect validity" in some cases.

=== Bilski case ===
This was followed by the decision of the CAFC in In re Bilski, which opened a new chapter in this history. In Bilski, as the article on that case explains^{[What article?]}, the CAFC superseded State Street and related decisions with a return to the tests of the patent-eligibility trilogy (Benson-Flook-Diehr), although while those decisions had merely treated the machine-or-transformation test as a clue to past decisions the CAFC attempted to make that test dispositive.

However, in 2009 the Supreme Court affirmed the judgment but overturned the CAFC's rationale in Bilski, stating that the machine-or-transformation test is not the exclusive test of patentability. At the same time, the Court (per Justice Kennedy) held, 5-4, that Bilski's software, business-method patent application was patent ineligible because it was directed to an abstract idea, largely preempting hedging as a business expedient. But the majority declined to rule all business-method patents ineligible. Justice Stevens, in one of his last opinions before retiring from the Court, concurred in the judgment but disagreed with the majority's rationale. Joined by Justices Ginsburg, Breyer, and Sotomayor, he argued that the claimed invention was patent ineligible because it was a business method (advancing much the same analysis as that in Judge Dyk's opinion in the Federal Circuit) and therefore outside the reach of the patent system. Justice Breyer filed a concurring opinion in which he explained the points on which all nine justices agreed.

=== Mayo case ===
Bilski was followed by the Court's unanimous opinion in Mayo Collaborative Services v. Prometheus Labs, Inc. Although it did not involve a software patent (it concerned a medical assay implementing a natural principle), it stated a methodology for determining patent eligibility that is currently dominant in software cases. It revived the approach of the Flook and Neilson cases, which is to treat the underlying principle, idea, or algorithm on which the claimed patent is based as if it were part of the prior art and to make patent eligibility turn on whether the implementation of it is inventive.

=== Alice case ===
In May, 2013, the CAFC issued a fragmented en banc decision in CLS Bank International v. Alice Corp. in which the judges were unable to reach a coherent unified decision on the patentability of the business-method software claims at issue. The case went to the Supreme Court, which decided it on June 19, 2014.

The Court used the analysis from the Mayo decision and held Alice's patents invalid as directed to an abstract idea. As in Bilski, the Court did not rule all business-method patents ineligible. However, the Court's requirement (as in Mayo and Flook) for an "inventive concept" for the implementation of the principle underlying the claimed method and its insistence that "merely saying [to] apply it with a computer" is not enough to confer patent eligibility may doom many or most business-method software patents.

=== Post-Alice period ===
Since the Alice decision, the Federal Circuit and district courts have held a number of business-method patents to be patent ineligible as mere abstract ideas implemented in a conventional way without embodying any inventive concept.

==== Digitech ====
In Digitech Image Technologies, LLC v. Electronics for Imaging, Inc., the Federal Circuit invalidated a patent on a "device profile" and methods for generating "device profiles." The device profile was a collection of information about a graphic image, and it was generated by combining data sets containing such information. The court held that the device and method for generating it were abstract ideas and patent ineligible: "Without additional limitations, a process that employs mathematical algorithms to manipulate existing information to generate additional information is not patent eligible."

==== buySAFE ====
In buySAFE, Inc. v. Google, Inc., the Federal Circuit invalidated under section 101 a patent on a computerized surety system for online transactions. The court said the computer implementation of the underlying surety idea was "not even arguably inventive." The court concluded: "In short, with the approach to this kind of section 101 issue clarified by Alice, it is a straightforward matter to conclude that the claims in this case are invalid." The court remarked in passing, however, that if "enough extra is included in a claim, it passes muster under section 101 even if it amounts to a business method." But the court did not explain or illustrate what would be "enough extra."

==== DDR Holdings ====
In DDR Holdings v. Hotels.com, the Federal Circuit upheld one patent and invalidated several others under Alice. This is the only instance since the Alice decision in which the Federal Circuit held a patent to be eligible. The court said that the eligible patent solved an Internet-centric problem in an inventive way. (It essentially framed one website within another, so that it appeared to be a part of the other site.)

==== Versata v. SAP ====
In Versata Development Group, Inc. v. SAP America, Inc., the Federal Circuit summarized its holdings in several other post-Alice cases that are not summarized above. The following summaries are extracted from the Federal Circuit's opinion in the Versata case:

- In Ultramercial, [the Federal Circuit] found that claims directed to the abstract idea of using an advertisement as an exchange or currency were ineligible even though the claims were tied to a general purpose computer and invoked the Internet.
- In Content Extraction &Transmission LLC v. Wells Fargo Bank, National Ass'n, [the Federal Circuit] found that claims directed to the abstract idea of collecting data from hardcopy documents, recognizing certain information within the collected data, and storing that information in memory were ineligible. This was true despite noting that, if the claims were construed in the most favorable manner to the appellants, the claims would require scanning and processing technology.

The Versata court also summarized two pre-Alice decisions in which the rulings were consistent with Alice:

- In Bancorp Services, L.L.C. v. Sun Life Assurance Co., [the Federal Circuit] found ineligible claims directed to the abstract idea of managing a stable value life insurance policy.
- In CyberSource Corp. v. Retail Decisions, Inc., [the Federal Circuit] found that a broadly worded method claim and a claim reciting a computer readable medium for executing the method claim were ineligible. [The Federal Circuit] concluded the claims were drawn to a method of verifying the validity of credit card transactions over the Internet, and the steps in the method could be performed in the human mind or by a human using a pen and paper.

In the 2015 Versata case, itself, the Federal Circuit affirmed the final order of the Patent Trial and Appeal Board (PTAB), the recently created adjudicatory arm of the United States Patent and Trademark Office (USPTO), invalidating as patent ineligible the claims in issue of Versata's patent on a method of determining what price to charge a customer. It said, "Using organizational and product group hierarchies to determine a price is an abstract idea that has no particular concrete or tangible form or application." Moreover, the implementation was a "purely conventional" use of a computer.

==== Loyalty Conversion and other 2014 district court cases ====
The software cases after Alice adopt its method of legal analysis, based on the decision of the Supreme Court in the Mayo case. This calls for a two-step analysis. First, the court determines whether the claimed invention is based on an abstract idea or principle of some sort, often expressed at a high level of generality, such as a computerized escrow or surety arrangement, as in the Bilski and Alice cases. If the claimed invention is directed to an abstract idea, the court proceeds to the second step of analysis, which is to determine whether the patent adds "something extra" to the idea that embodies an "inventive concept." If there is no addition of an inventive element to the underlying abstract idea, the court will find the patent invalid under section 101.

Few software patents have survived this analysis since the Alice decision, largely because they are written in purely functional language to claim a result rather than describe a structure for accomplishing a result. Thus, Federal Circuit Judge Bryson explained when sitting by designation as a trial judge in the Loyalty v. American Airlines case:

In short, such patents, although frequently dressed up in the argot of invention, simply describe a problem, announce purely functional steps that purport to solve the problem, and recite standard computer operations to perform some of those steps. The principal flaw in these patents is that they do not contain an "inventive concept" that solves practical problems and ensures that the patent is directed to something "significantly more than" the ineligible abstract idea itself. See CLS Bank, 134 S. Ct. at 2355, 2357; Mayo, 132 S. Ct. at 1294. As such, they represent little more than functional descriptions of objectives, rather than inventive solutions. In addition, because they describe the claimed methods in functional terms, they preempt any subsequent specific solutions to the problem at issue. See CLS Bank, 134 S. Ct. at 2354; Mayo, 132 S. Ct. at 1301-02. It is for those reasons that the Supreme Court has characterized such patents as claiming "abstract ideas" and has held that they are not directed to patentable subject matter.

==== What software patents will survive Alice analysis? ====
The question has been raised, therefore, what kinds of software-related patents will survive the analysis prescribed in Alice and Mayo. The question was considered during the oral argument of the Alice case, although not more than cursorily in the opinion. Counsel for CLS Bank suggested that data compression and data encryption were software technologies that are likely to be patent-eligible because they address "a business problem, a social problem, or a technological problem." The Solicitor General, as amicus curiae, said that it would be difficult to identify a patent-eligible business method unless it involved an improved technology, such as "a process for additional security point-of-sale credit card transactions using particular encryption technology" – "that might well be patent eligible."

At least one commentator has questioned that, however, because encryption largely consists of mathematical operations using modular arithmetic and theorems of Euler. Yet, as the commentator points out, in the Flook case the Supreme Court said: "As the CCPA has explained, 'if a claim is directed essentially to a method of calculating, using a mathematical formula, even if the solution is for a specific purpose, the claimed method is nonstatutory [patent ineligible].' " Furthermore, in July 2014, just after the Alice decision came down, a Federal Circuit panel held a patent ineligible, quoting Flook and adding: "Without additional limitations, a process that employs mathematical algorithms to manipulate existing information to generate additional information is not patent eligible." Judge Bryson's comments, quoted above, may therefore be more predictive of the likely outcomes of future software-related patent cases, including encryption ones, than counsel's assurances during oral argument in the Alice case.

==== Allvoice ====
In Allvoice Developments US, LLC v. Microsoft Corp., the Federal Circuit in a May 2015 nonprecedential opinion invalidated patent claims to a speech recognition "interface" without undertaking an Alice analysis. The so-called interface was entirely a set of software instructions, claimed in means-plus-function form. The court found it unnecessary to go through the two-step analysis because a set of instructions is not a machine or article of manufacture or composition of matter, and it did not purport to be a process. Accordingly, the claimed subject matter did not fit within any of the statutory categories of section 101, which defines patentable subject matter. Moreover, it was intangible, and in the Digitech case, the Federal Circuit had held that except for processes, "eligible subject matter must exist in some physical or tangible form."

== Landmark decisions ==
- Gottschalk v. Benson
- Parker v. Flook
- Diamond v. Diehr
- State Street Bank v. Signature Financial Group
- In re Bilski
- Alice Corp. v. CLS Bank International
- DDR Holdings v. Hotels.com

== See also ==
- List of United States Supreme Court patent case law
- List of United States patent law cases
- Machine-or-transformation test
- Patentable subject matter in the United States
- Software patent
- Software patent debate
- Software patents under the European Patent Convention
- Software patents under TRIPs Agreement
- Limitations on exclusive rights: Computer programs (United States copyright law)
