= Intellectual Property Law Association of Chicago =

The Intellectual Property Law Association of Chicago ("IPLAC") is the oldest intellectual property law association in the United States. Founded in Chicago in 1884 as the “Patent Law Association” and later incorporated on September 23, 1924, as the Patent Law Association of Chicago, it changed to its current name in the late 20th century to reflect the practice of its members within intellectual property law.

== Goals ==
IPLAC is a not-for-profit organization "dedicated to maintaining a high standard of professionalism in the practice of patent, trademark, copyright, trade secret, and related fields of law". One of IPLAC's principal goals is to aid in the development and administration of intellectual property law and the manner by which it is applied by the courts, the United States Patent and Trademark Office, and the United States Copyright Office. IPLAC also provides a medium for the exchange of views on intellectual property law among those practicing in the field, and aim to educate the public at large. IPLAC provides many continuing legal education ("CLE") programs in intellectual property law and legal ethics to its members and others who are interested. Through its Creative Achievement Award, IPLAC annually recognizes the inventive and creative achievements of individuals and groups in the Chicago area. The organization also established the IPLAC Educational Foundation, which awards scholarships to Chicago area high school graduates intending to pursue college-level study in engineering and science.

== Members ==
IPLAC's over 1,100 members are centered primarily in the Chicago area. They represent a full spectrum of the intellectual property law profession and include attorneys in private and corporate practice, law school professors, paralegals, law students, and other intellectual property law professionals. IPLAC also has approximately 30 honorary members from the federal judiciary.

== Judges' Dinner and Annual Symposium ==
One of IPLAC's longstanding traditions is the annual Judges’ Dinner to honor the federal Judiciary, with the first dinner held in its founding year. In 2007, IPLAC began presenting an annual patent law symposium on the same day as the Judges’ Dinner.

== Patent Claim Construction Book ==
Another project of IPLAC is an annual review of patent claim interpretation law of the U.S. Court of Appeals for the Federal Circuit. Originally distributed in manuscript form to federal judges in Chicago, in 2006 it became a West publication and is currently distributed under the title, Patent Claim Construction in the Federal Circuit. This title is also available on WESTLAW under the database CLAIMCFC.

== See also ==
- Intellectual property organizations
