= Sigdash =

Sigdash may refer to:

- Sığdaş, a village in Azerbaijan
- Sig dashes, formatting indicator for e-mail signatures
