= Graver Tank & Manufacturing Co. v. Linde Air Products Co. =

- Supreme Court of the United States

Argued March 30, 1950 Decided May 29, 1950
- Full case name: Graver Tank & Manufacturing Company, Incorporated, et al. v. Linde Air Products Company
- Citations: 339 U.S. 605 (more) 70 S. Ct. 854; 94 L. Ed. 1097; 1950 U.S. LEXIS 2608; 85 U.S.P.Q. (BNA) 328

Holding
- The Court established the propriety of the doctrine of equivalents, and explained how and when it is to be used.

Court membership
- Chief Justice Fred M. Vinson Associate Justices Hugo Black · Stanley F. Reed; Felix Frankfurter · William O. Douglas; Robert H. Jackson · Harold H. Burton; Tom C. Clark · Sherman Minton

Case opinions
- Majority: Jackson, joined by Vinson, Reed, Frankfurter, Burton, Clark
- Dissent: Black, joined by Douglas
- Dissent: Douglas
- Minton took no part in the consideration or decision of the case.

Laws applied
- U.S. Const.

Graver Tank & Manufacturing Co. v. Linde Air Products Co., 339 U.S. 605 (1950), was an important United States Supreme Court decision in the area of patent law, establishing the propriety of the doctrine of equivalents, and explaining how and when it was to be used.

== Facts ==
The plaintiff Linde Air Products Co. owned a patent for an electric welding process, and sued defendants including the Graver company for infringing the patent. The defendants asserted that they were not infringing the patent because the patented welding process used a welding composition made of alkaline earth metal silicate and calcium fluoride (usually expressed as silicates of calcium and magnesium), while the purported infringers substituted a similar element, manganese, for the patentee's magnesium. The United States district court found infringement, and the Court of Appeals affirmed the infringement claim.

== Issue ==
The Supreme Court agreed to review the case, limited to the question of whether the substitution of a similar material not claimed in the patent itself would save the defendants from being held liable for infringements.

== Result ==
The Court, in an opinion written by Justice Robert Jackson, raised the doctrine of equivalents. It noted that if another party could use a process exactly the same as one that is patented, but escape infringement by making some obvious substitution of materials, it would deprive the patentee of the exclusive control meant to come with a patent. This would undermine the profitability of the patent, which would go against the policy of encouraging inventors to invent by giving the opportunity to profit from the labor of invention.

The Court also outlined how the doctrine should be used, noting that "what constitutes equivalency must be determined against the context of the patent, the prior art, and the particular circumstances of the case." The Court laid out two possible tests to determine equivalency. Under the first of these (which has since come to be known as the "triple identity" test), something is deemed equivalent if:

1. It performs substantially the same function
2. in substantially the same way
3. to obtain the same result.

Under the second test, something is deemed equivalent if there is only an "insubstantial change" between each of the features of the accused device or process and the patent claim.

In this case, the Court gave particular weight to the determination of "whether persons reasonably skilled in the art would have known of the interchangeability of an ingredient not contained in the patent with one that was." Finding that the substitution of magnesium for manganese was both obvious to anyone working in the field, and was an insubstantial change, the Court upheld the finding of patent infringement.

== Dissent ==
Justice Hugo Black dissented, joined by Justice Douglas. They contended that it is the responsibility of the person seeking the patent to claim everything that the patent covers, and noted that processes exist for a patent to be amended. They asserted that it was the responsibility of the Patent Office to determine the scope of the invention, and it was therefore an intrusion for courts to be expanding the scope of the patent beyond what the Patent Office has determined.

== Later developments ==
The employment of this doctrine raised a great deal of controversy, as many legal commentators thought that it allowed patentees to protect more than they had specifically requested, and indeed more than they may have been permitted to request in a patent claim. The doctrine was again questioned by the Supreme Court in Warner-Jenkinson Company, Inc. v. Hilton Davis Chemical Co., which unanimously reaffirmed it, although with some refinements.

== See also ==
- List of United States Supreme Court cases, volume 339
