= Disclaimer =

Any statement intended to specify or delimit the scope of rights and obligations

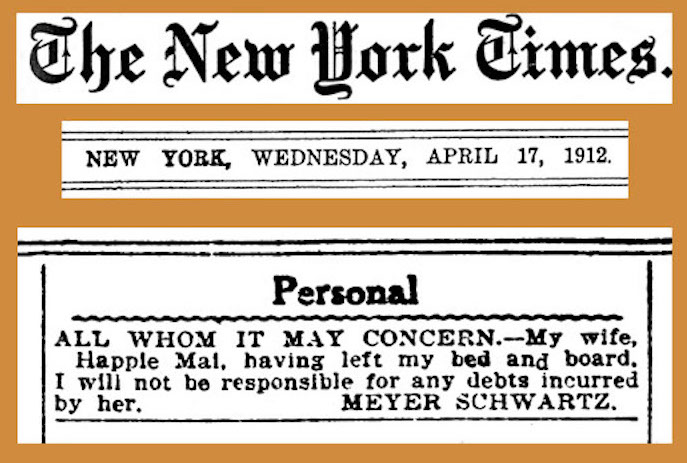
Disclaimers often concern public safety or business relationships, or, as shown here, may be of a personal nature. Publishing disclaimers is an attempt to provide constructive notice to possible claimants.

A disclaimer is generally any statement intended to specify or delimit the scope of rights and obligations that may be exercised and enforced by parties in a legally recognized relationship. In contrast to other terms for legally operative language, the term disclaimer usually implies situations that involve some level of uncertainty, waiver, or risk.

A disclaimer may specify mutually agreed and privately arranged terms and conditions as part of a contract; or may specify warnings or expectations to the general public (or some other class of persons) in order to fulfill a duty of care owed to prevent unreasonable risk of harm or injury. Some disclaimers are intended to limit exposure to damages after a harm or injury has already been suffered. Additionally, some kinds of disclaimers may represent a voluntary waiver of a right or obligation that may be owed to the disclaimant.

Disclaimers vary in terms of their uniformity. Some may vary depending on the specific context and parties involved, while other types of disclaimers may strictly adhere to a uniform and established set of formalities that are rarely or never modified, except under official authority. Some of these formal disclaimers are required pursuant to industry regulation, qualification for protection under a safe harbor, and other situations where the exact wording of a particular clause or document may be dispositive in the event of a legal dispute. (See e.g., Product liability, Toxicity class, Rule against perpetuities, Public Health Cigarette Smoking Act.)

The presence of a disclaimer in a legally binding agreement does not necessarily guarantee that the terms of the disclaimer will be recognized and enforced in a legal dispute. There may be other legal considerations that render a disclaimer void either in whole or part.

== Tort law ==
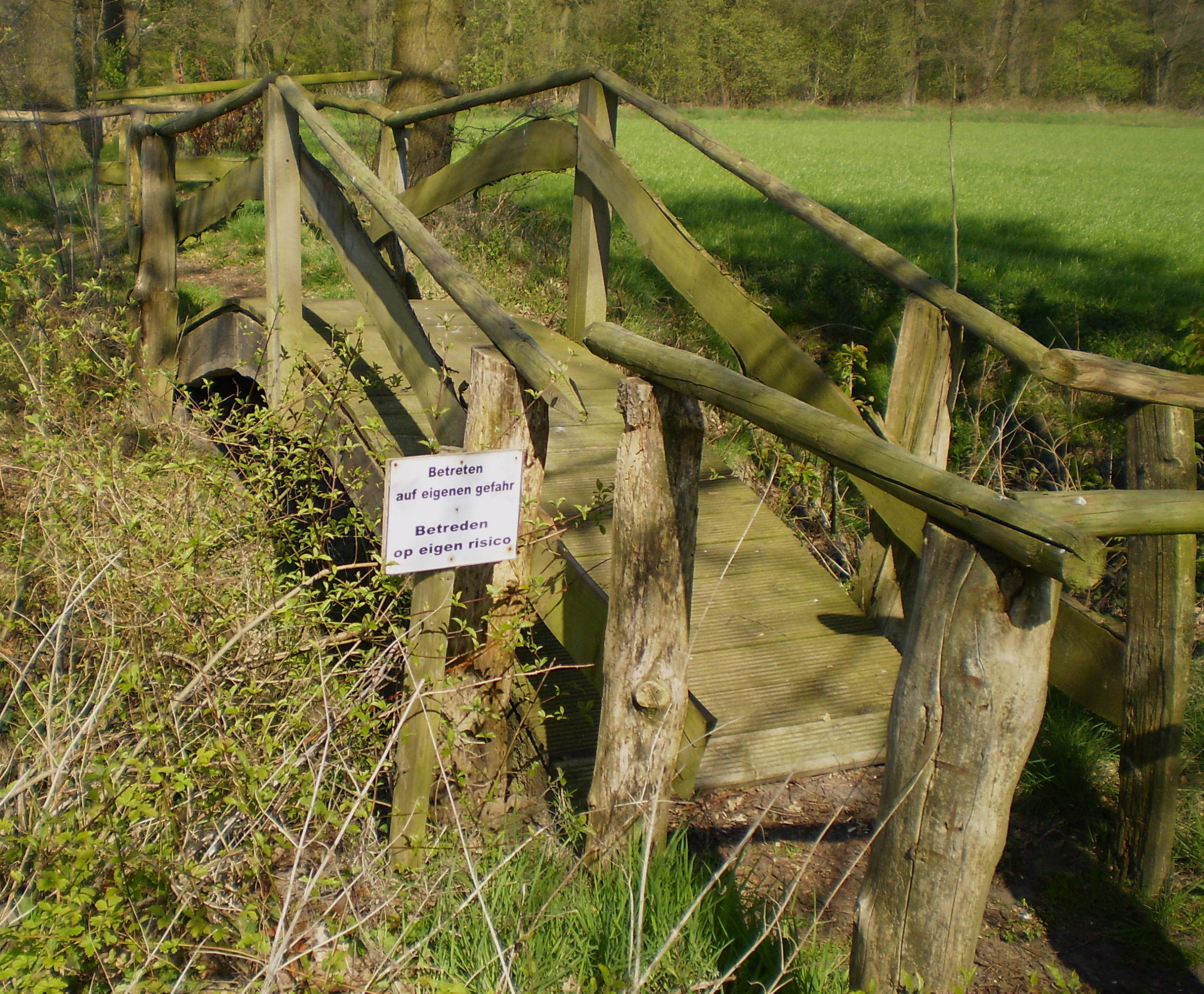
Sign on bridge with a warning "Use at own risk"

In law, a disclaimer is a statement denying responsibility intended to prevent civil liability arising for particular acts or omissions. Disclaimers are frequently made to escape the effects of the torts of negligence and of occupiers' liability towards visitors. The courts may or may not give effect to the disclaimer depending on whether the law permits exclusion of liability in the particular situation and whether the acts or omissions complained of fall within the wording of the disclaimer.

A disclaimer may take effect as a term of the contract between the person making the disclaimer and the person who is thereby prevented from suing. This kind of disclaimer is, for example, invariably found in the 'terms and conditions' that a software user is confronted with when first installing the software. There will often be term(s) excluding any liability for any damage that the software might cause to the rest of the user's software and hardware. By clicking "I Agree" in the dialogue box, users are agreeing to this disclaimer as a matter of contract between themselves and the software company.

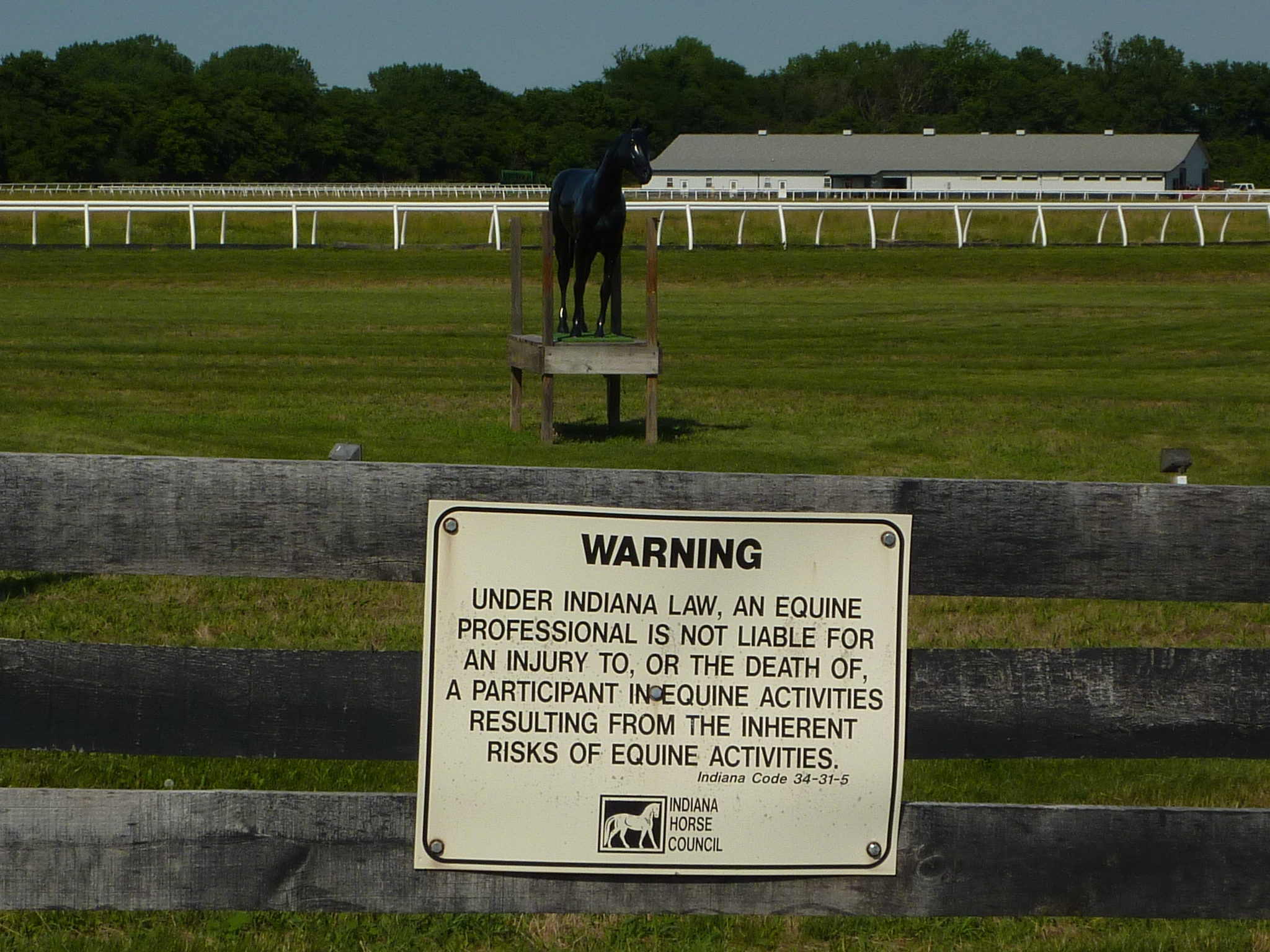
Disclaimer of liability for "equine professionals" (Indiana)

At common law, disclaimers can also have effect as conditions of a license (i.e. permission) to enter the land. An occupier of land will have certain duties to take care for the personal safety of people he or she allows onto the premises. By placing a sign at the entrance to the premises, such as "visitors enter at their own risk", the occupier may be able to stop entrants from successfully suing in tort for damage or injury caused by the unsafe nature of the premises. Warnings or disclaimers contained in signs may, by a slightly different legal analysis leading to the same result, allow the person who would otherwise be responsible to rely on the defense of consent.

Under UK law, the validity of disclaimers is significantly limited by the Unfair Contract Terms Act 1977. By virtue of the Act, a business cannot use a contract term or a notice to exclude or restrict its liability for negligence causing death or personal injury. In the case of other loss or damage, a disclaimer will only be effective so long as it is reasonable in all the circumstances. The common law in other nations may also place legal limits on the validity of disclaimers; for instance, the Australian Competition & Consumer Commission successfully prosecuted Target Australia for the use of inaccessible disclaimers in advertisements (the televised advertisements in question contained disclaimers that were only shown on screen for 1.50 seconds).

In the United States, disclaimers on the sale of goods are covered by Article 2 of the Uniform Commercial Code, but details vary by state. Unless considered unconscionable, disclaimers are generally enforceable as part of a contract between knowledgeable parties of comparable bargaining power, but most states do not allow a party to limit their liability for gross negligence.

== Patent law ==
In patent law, a disclaimer identifies, in a claim, subject-matter that is not claimed. By extension, a disclaimer may also mean the action of introducing a negative limitation in a claim, i.e. "an amendment to a claim resulting in the incorporation therein of a "negative" technical feature, typically excluding from a general feature specific embodiments or areas". The allowability of disclaimers is subject to particular conditions, which may vary widely from one jurisdiction to another.

A prosecution disclaimer is another type of disclaimer in patent law. Under United States patent law a prosecution disclaimer is a statement made by a patent applicant during examination of a patent application which can limit the scope of protection provided by the resulting patent. It is one type of file-wrapper estoppel, the other being prosecution history estoppel.

== Estate law ==
In estate or inheritance law, a disclaimer (also called disclaimer of interest) is a written document voluntarily signed by an heir to an estate in which the said heir does not accept (disclaims) the part of the estate of a deceased person which the heir is entitled to receive. The disclaimed part of the estate is then inherited not necessarily by a person of the disclaiming heir's choice, but by the next heir in line to receive that part of the estate as if the disclaiming heir were also deceased, either according to the will, beneficiary designation, or the laws of intestacy. Government tax agencies have further rules on such disclaimers. Reasons for such disclaimers may include the imminent death of the disclaimant or the fact that the disclaimant already has enough wealth.

== Literature ==
The all persons fictitious disclaimer is a standard disclaimer used in works of fiction in an attempt to avoid liability for defamation.

In the case of fan fiction, the author will usually give a disclaimer saying that the author of the fan fiction does not, in any way, profit from the story and that all creative rights to the characters belong to their original creator(s).

== See also ==
- Email disclaimer
- E&OE, an initialism standing for "errors and omissions excepted"
- Mandatory disclaimer
