= KPMG v Securefin =

South African legal case

KPMG Chartered Accountants (SA) v Securefin Ltd and Another, potentially a landmark case in South African contract law, was heard in the Supreme Court of Appeal (SCA) on 17 February 2009, with judgment handed down on 13 March. It could herald a new era in the interpretation of contracts in South Africa.

== Facts ==
Securefin instituted an action in the High Court, claiming damages from KPMG for breach of contract. KPMG denied Securefin's interpretation of the contract. After a separation of issues, the High Court heard oral evidence. Much of the evidence dealt with the interpretation of the contract. Each party called an expert on the issue, and they testified for about fourteen days. The factual witnesses also spent most of their time dealing with interpretative issues.

The High Court ultimately determined the various issues in favour of the respondents and issued a declaratory order.

== Judgment ==
In an appeal to the SCA, Harms JA deemed it necessary to make several points about the role of expert evidence in matters concerning interpretation:

1. The integration (or parol evidence) rule was frequently being ignored by practitioners and seldom enforced by trial courts.
2. Interpretation is a matter of law, not of fact, and accordingly interpretation is a matter for the court, not for witnesses.
3. The rules about the admissibility of evidence on interpretation do not depend on the nature of the document, whether statute, contract or patent.
4. To the extent that outside evidence is admissible to contextualise the document in order to establish its "factual matrix" or purpose, or for the purposes of identification, it has to be used as conservatively as possible. There is no merit, wrote Harms, in trying to distinguish between background circumstances and surrounding circumstances; this distinction is artificial and confusing, with the result that everything tends to be admitted. The terms "context" or "factual matrix" ought to his mind to suffice.

The courts had made no attempt, found Harms, to curtail the "growing and undesirable" practice of allowing expert witnesses to testify as to the meaning of a contract. An expert could be asked relevant questions based on assumptions or hypotheses put by counsel as to the meaning of a document, but the expert, and any other witnesses, could not be asked about the meaning of the document. The witness (expert or otherwise) could also not be cross-examined on the meaning of the document or on the validity of the hypothesis about its meaning.

Nevertheless, the SCA upheld the High Court judgment.
