= Festo Corp. v. Shoketsu Kinzoku Kogyo Kabushiki Co. =

- Supreme Court of the United States

Argued January 8, 2002 Decided May 28, 2002
- Full case name: Festo Corporation, Petitioner v. Shoketsu Kinzoku Kogyo Kabushiki Company, Ltd., et al.
- Citations: 535 U.S. 722 (more) 122 S. Ct. 1831; 152 L. Ed. 2d 944; 2002 U.S. LEXIS 3818; 70 U.S.L.W. 4458; 62 U.S.P.Q. (BNA) 1705; 2002 Cal. Daily Op. Service 4539; 2002 Daily Journal DAR 5803; 15 Fla. L. Weekly Fed. S 320

Case history
- Prior: On writ of certiorari to the United States Court of Appeals for the Federal Circuit. Festo Corp. v. Shoketsu Kinzoku Kogyo Kabushiki Co., 234 F.3d 558, 2000 U.S. App. LEXIS 29979 (Fed. Cir. 2000)
- Subsequent: On remand at Festo Corp. v. Shoketsu Kinzoku Kogyo Kabushiki Co., 304 F.3d 1289, 2002 U.S. App. LEXIS 19734 (Fed. Cir., 2002). On remand at Festo Corp. v. Shoketsu Kinzoku Kogyo Kabushiki Co., 344 F.3d 1359, 2003 U.S. App. LEXIS 19867 (Fed. Cir. 2003). On remand to the district court, Festo Corp. v. Shoketsu Kinzoku Kogyo Kabushiki Co., 2005 WL 1398528 (D. Mass. June 10, 2005), motion to alter or amend denied Festo Corp. v. Shoketsu Kinzoku Kogyo Kabushiki Co., 2006 WL 47695 (D. Mass. Jan. 19, 2006). On subsequent appeal, Festo Corp. v. Shoketsu Kinzoku Kogyo Kabushiki Co., 493 F.3d 1368 (Fed. Cir. 2007).

Holding
- Claim amendments must be examined in context of the prosecution history and do not necessarily bar assertions under the Doctrine of Equivalents due to prosecution history estoppel. Judgment of the Federal Circuit vacated and remanded.

Court membership
- Chief Justice William Rehnquist Associate Justices John P. Stevens · Sandra Day O'Connor; Antonin Scalia · Anthony Kennedy; David Souter · Clarence Thomas; Ruth Bader Ginsburg · Stephen Breyer

Case opinion
- Majority: Kennedy, joined by unanimous

Laws applied
- U. S. Const., Art. I, §8, cl. 8.; 35 U.S.C. §112

Festo Corp. v Shoketsu Kinzoku Kogyo Kabushiki Co., 535 U.S. 722 (2002), was a United States Supreme Court decision in the area of patent law that examined the relationship between the doctrine of equivalents (which holds that a patent can be infringed by something that is not literally falling within the scope of the claims because a somewhat insubstantial feature or element has been substituted) and the doctrine of prosecution history estoppel (which holds that a party who makes a change to a patent application to accommodate the requirements of patent law cannot claim infringement by equivalents of an element that was narrowed by that change).

== Background of the case ==
Festo Corporation (petitioner) possessed patents for an industrial device. After Festo began marketing its device, Shoketsu Kinzoku Kogyo Kabushiki Co. (SMC, respondents) entered the market with a device that used one two-way sealing ring and a nonmagnetizable sleeve. Festo Corporation already owned two similar patents (although their initial patent application was rejected) for this industrial device. Festo filed suit, claiming that SMC's device was sufficiently similar that it infringed Festo's patents under the doctrine of equivalents. Festo's claim had been amended during prosecution for, at the very least, compliance with 35 U.S.C. §112 (claim structure, see Jepson claims), and thus Shoketsu claimed that prosecution history estoppel should bar Festo from asserting equivalents.

The United States District Court for the District of Massachusetts held that Festo's amendments were not made to avoid prior art, and therefore the amendments were not the kind that give rise to estoppel. A panel of the Federal Circuit affirmed. 72 F. 3d 857 (1995). The Supreme Court granted certiorari, vacated, and remanded in light of an intervening decision in Warner-Jenkinson v. Hilton Davis Chemical Co.. After a decision by the original panel on remand, 172 F. 3d 1361 (1999), the Federal Circuit ordered rehearing en banc, 187 F. 3d 1381 (1999). The court sitting en banc held that claim amendments made for compliance with the Patent Act presented a complete bar to claiming equivalents.

== Issue ==
Whether any amendment to a patent application that narrowed a patent claim to comply with the Patent Act creates an absolute bar to equivalents for the particular claim limitation that was narrowed by the amendment.

== Court's decision ==
The Supreme Court vacated the ruling made by the Federal Circuit, holding that such amendments do not create an absolute bar, but instead must be examined in light of the reason for the change. In the unanimous opinion, Justice Kennedy explained that it was not whether prosecution history estoppel applied to amendments, but to what extent the amendment surrendered coverage of the claim. If the change was made to clarify a translation, for example, the inventor should suffer no reduction in rights. But if the change was made to keep the patent from overlapping with another patent, then the applicant will be presumed to have given up the right to complain about anything broader than the patent claim itself.

In particular, the Court held that patentee's decision to narrow claims through amendment in order to comply with the Patent Act automatically assumes surrender of the territory between the original claim and the amended claim, i.e., a presumption of surrendering all equivalents for the particular claim limitation that was narrowed by the amendment. The Court thus placed the burden on the applicant as to showing what equivalents were not surrendered.

The Court conceded, however, that there are some cases where the amendment cannot be viewed as surrendering a particular equivalent. "The equivalent may have been unforeseeable at the time of the application; the rationale underlying the amendment may bear no more than a tangential relation to the equivalent in question; or there may be some other reason suggesting that the patentee could not reasonably be expected to have described the insubstantial substitute in question. In those cases the patentee can overcome the presumption that prosecution history estoppel bars a finding of equivalence."

== See also ==
- List of United States Supreme Court cases, volume 535
- List of United States Supreme Court cases
