= Prosecution history estoppel =

Legal doctrine

Prosecution history estoppel, also known as file-wrapper estoppel, is a term used to indicate that a person who has filed a patent application, and then makes narrowing amendments to the application to accommodate the patent law, may be precluded from invoking the doctrine of equivalents to broaden the scope of their claims to cover subject matter ceded by the amendments. Although primarily a U.S. term, questions of whether, or the extent to which the prosecution history should be relevant for determining the extent of protection of a patent also arise outside the U.S.

== Canada ==
On December 13, 2018, new section 53.1 of the Patent Act makes prosecution history evidence admissible before the Court for the purposes of claim construction.

Patents in Canada are subject to a purposive construction, which relies on reading both the claims and the specifications to determine the scope of a patent, and extrinsic evidence is not permitted. Therefore, the Canadian courts emphatically reject what they refer to as "file wrapper estoppel". No distinction is drawn between cases involving allegations of literal infringement and those involving substantive infringement, which means that the negotiations that have taken place between the patentee and the Patent Office cannot be used in order to establish a particular equivalent. Similarly, a patentee is barred from using any previous negotiations with the Patent Office in order to determine the scope of the claims of the patent (i.e. the negotiations cannot be used by the patentee or against the patentee in determining the scope of the claims within the patent).

This is one of the significant differences that exist between Canadian and US patent jurisprudence, which leads some legal commentators to state that Canada is more friendly for rights holders in pursuing patent claims.

== Germany ==
The German Federal Court of Justice ruled in 2002 that "issues derived from prosecution history cannot be taken into account in the assessment of the scope of protection of a patent, even with regard to the requirement of legal certainty". More than a decade later, the Federal Court of Justice ruled on 14 June 2016 that statements made during prosecution may indicate how the skilled person construes a patent. At the same time, the Federal Court of Justice set forth that such indications must not readily be relied on as the sole basis of claim construction.

== Ireland ==
The Irish Supreme Court has ruled that "evidence from the file which reflects the views of the patentee as to the construction of the claims is inadmissible".

== Netherlands ==
The Dutch Supreme Court has effectively come to the opposite conclusion to most other countries in Europe. The Dutch Supreme Court has stated that where "a third party invokes the examination file in the course of confirming the interpretation defended by him of a patent, it cannot be seen that that requirement [the reasonable doubt threshold] would force any restriction on involving public data from the examination file with the interpretation of the patent".

== United Kingdom ==
The UK courts have ruled that use of the examination file in aiding construction of a patent should be discouraged except where that file includes "objective information about and commentary on experiments".

== United States ==
The defining case on prosecution estoppel in the United States is Festo Corp. v. Shoketsu Kinzoku Kogyo Kabushiki Co.

=== Festo Corp. v. Shoketsu Kinzoku Kogyo Kabushiki Co. ===
==== Court of Appeals holding ====
In November 2000, the Court of Appeals for the Federal Circuit set a complete bar rule. This complete bar rule completely prohibited a patent owner from asserting the doctrine of equivalents for certain elements of her claim in instances where, during her patent prosecution she files:

1. an amendment that narrows the scope of a claim for any reason related to the statutory requirements for a patent will give rise to a complete bar with respect to the amended claim element;
2. a "voluntary" claim amendment that narrows the scope of the claim for a reason related to the statutory requirements for a patent will give rise to prosecution history estoppel as to the amended claim element; and
3. an amendment and fails to explain the reasons for the amendment during prosecution of her patent.

==== Supreme Court reversal ====
The United States Supreme Court in their opinion Festo Corp. v. Shoketsu Kinzoku Kogyo Kabushiki Co., 535 U. S. 722 (2002), citing the instruction in Warner-Jenkinson Company, Inc. v. Hilton Davis Chemical Co., finding that "courts must be cautious before adopting changes that disrupt the settled expectations of the inventing community", overturned the complete bar issued by the Federal Circuit. It also acknowledged that while any narrowing amendment made for a reason related to patentability could give rise to prosecution history estoppel, inventors who amended their claims under the previous case law had no reason to believe that they were conceding all equivalents of amended elements when responding to a rejection. Had they known, the Court stated, they might have appealed the rejection.

With this policy in mind, the Court stated that it preferred a presumptive bar approach to the doctrine of equivalents. This presumptive bar approach holds that where claims are amended, "the inventor is deemed to concede that the patent does not extend as far as the original claim" and the patentee has the burden of showing that the amendment does not surrender the particular equivalent. To succeed, then, the patentee must establish that:

1. the equivalent was unforeseeable at the time the claim was drafted;
2. the amendment did not surrender the particular equivalent in question; or
3. there was some reason why the patentee could not have recited the equivalent in the claim.

== See also ==
- Prosecution disclaimer
