= Formstein defence =

In the context of German patent law, the Formstein defence is a well-known defense against an alleged infringement by equivalents, wherein the alleged infringer claims that the embodiment alleged to be equivalent (to the subject-matter claimed in the patent) is not patentable and therefore the doctrine of equivalents does not apply. It is similar to the UK's Gillette defense and the U.S. Wilson case. The name "Formstein" means "molded kerbstone" and comes from a landmark decision of the Federal Court of Justice of Germany (Bundesgerichtshof) issued in 1986.

== See also ==
- Arrow declaration
