= Arrow declaration =

In UK patent litigation, an Arrow declaration is a declaration or order sought, for reasons of legal certainty, from a court that a product (or process) to be launched was old (i.e., not novel) or obvious in patent law terms at a particular date, so that the product (or process) cannot be affected by (i.e., cannot infringe) any later granted patent, which would itself necessarily also either lack novelty or inventive step. The order is named after Arrow Generics Ltd. v Merck & Co Inc [2007] EWHC 1900 (Pat), in which it was originally suggested that this mechanism would be available as a declaratory relief. Such a declaration was granted for the first time in Fujifilm Kyowa Kirin Biologics Company Ltd v Abbvie Biotechnology Ltd [2017] EWHC 395 (Pat), Patents Court, England, 3 March 2017.

The defense is similar to a so-called "Gillette defense", i.e. "the argument in infringement proceedings (...) that the defendant's product implements prior art technology, such that any patent which it infringes must be invalid."

== See also ==
- Chilling effect
- Formstein defence
- Patent infringement under United Kingdom law
