= Patent infringement under United Kingdom law =

In the United Kingdom, a patent provides its proprietor with the right to exclude others from utilizing the invention claimed in that patent. Should a person utilize that invention, without the permission of the patent proprietor, they may infringe that patent.

== Legislation ==
Infringement under United Kingdom patent law is defined by Section 60 of the Patents Act 1977 (as amended), which sets out the different types of infringement.

== Infringement ==
- Where the invention is a product, by the making, disposing of, offering to dispose of, using, importing or keeping a patented product.
- Where the invention is a process, by the use, or offer for use where it is known that the use of the process would be an infringement. Also, by the disposal of, offer to dispose of, use or import of a product obtained directly by means of that process, or the keeping of any such product whether for disposal or otherwise.
- By the supply, or offer to supply, in the United Kingdom, a person not entitled to work the invention, with any of the means, relating to an essential element of the invention, for putting the invention into effect, when it is known (or it is reasonable to expect such knowledge) that those means are suitable for putting, and are intended to put, the invention into effect in the United Kingdom.

An action for infringement can only be brought after grant of the patent, but damages can be recovered under Section 69 for infringing acts conducted after publication of the application, but before grant, provided those acts infringe the claims both as published and as granted, and provided the defendant can be shown to have been aware of the existence of the patent (or patent application). The protection conferred by publication of the application is known as provisional protection. Publication of European applications and Patent Cooperation Treaty (PCT) applications confers provisional protection in the same manner, provided the application is published in English.

== Remedies ==
A claimant for infringement may be awarded a range of remedies (under section 61), depending on the facts of the particular case. Damages may be awarded to rectify financial harm suffered, an injunction may be granted to prevent further action by the infringer, an account of profits may be ordered, an order for the delivery up or destruction of infringing items may be made or a declaration that the patent is valid and infringed may be granted to the patentee. Both damages and an account of profits may not be ordered in respect of the same infringement. Limitations on damages or costs may apply under certain circumstances, for example if the defendant was unaware of the patent's existence damages may not be awarded, or where the patent was subject to a transaction that was not registered at the Patent Office within 6 months an award of costs to the successful party may not be awarded.

== See also ==
- Anton Piller order, order for search and seizure without warning to prevent destruction of evidence
- Arrow declaration
- Cease and desist
- Copyright infringement
- Industrial espionage
- Inequitable conduct
- Non-binding opinion (United Kingdom patent law)
- Patent retaliation (clause)
- Patent troll
- Software hoarding
- Trademark infringement
