= Errors and omissions excepted =

Legal phrase used to reduce liability

"Errors and omissions excepted" (E&OE) is a phrase used in an attempt to reduce legal liability for potentially incorrect or incomplete information supplied in a contractually related document such as a quotation or specification.

It is often applied as a disclaimer in situations in which the information to which it is applied is relatively fast-moving. In legal terms, it seeks to make a statement that information cannot be relied upon, or may have changed by the time of use.

It is regularly used in accounting, to "excuse slight mistakes or oversights."

It is also used when a large amount of information is listed against a product, to state that—to the best of the supplier's knowledge—the information is correct, but they will not be held responsible if an error has been committed.
