= Signature block =

Type of personalized block

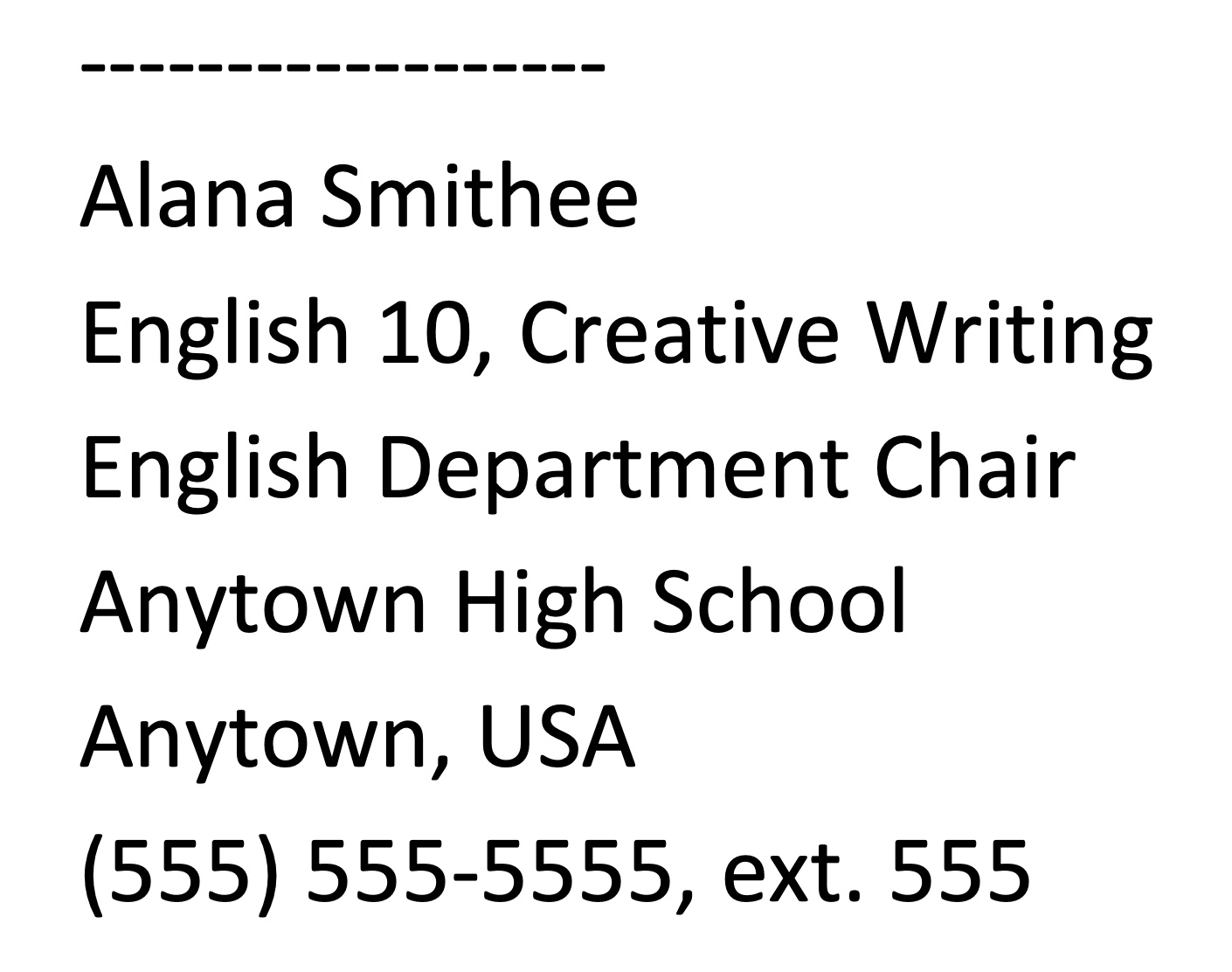
An email signature block example, using a female variant of the Alan Smithee pseudonym.

A signature block (often abbreviated as signature, sig block, sig file, .sig, dot sig, siggy, or just sig) is a personalized block of text automatically appended at the bottom of an email message, Usenet article, or forum post.

== Email and Usenet ==
An email signature is a block of text appended to the end of an email message often containing the sender's name, address, phone number, disclaimer or other contact information.

"Traditional" internet cultural .sig practices assume the use of monospaced ASCII text because they pre-date MIME and the use of HTML in email. In this tradition, it is common practice for a signature block to consist of one or more lines containing some brief information on the author of the message such as phone number and email address, URLs for sites owned or favoured by the author—but also often a quotation (occasionally automatically generated by such tools as fortune), or an ASCII art picture. Among some groups of people it has been common to include self-classification codes.

  |\_/|        ****************************    (\_/)
 / @ @ \       *  "Purrrfectly pleasant"  *   (='.'=)
( > º < )      *       Poppy Prinz        *   (")_(")
 `>>x<<´       *   (pprinz@example.com)   *
 /  O  \       ****************************

Example of a signature block using ASCII art.

Most email clients, including Mozilla Thunderbird, Opera Mail, Microsoft Outlook, Outlook Express, and Eudora, can be configured to automatically append an email signature with each new message. A shortened form of a signature block (sometimes called a "signature line"), only including one's name, often with some distinguishing prefix, can be used to simply indicate the end of a post or response. Most email servers can be configured to append email signatures to all outgoing mail as well.

=== Email signature generator ===
An email signature generator is an app or an online web app that allows users to create a designed email signature using a pre-made template (with no need for HTML coding skills).

=== Signatures in Usenet postings ===
Signature blocks are also used in the Usenet discussion system.

...orist it's an unnecessary optimization and a (to use your words)
"performance hack", but I'm interested in a Real operating system ---
not a research toy.

=-=-=-=-=-=-=-=-=-=-=-=-=-=-=-=-=-=-=-=-=-=-=-=-=-=-=-=-=-=-=-=-=-=-=
Theodore Ts'o				bloom-beacon!mit-athena!tytso
308 High St., Medford, MA 02155		ty...@athena.mit.edu
   Everybody's playing the game, but nobody's rules are the same!

— a real example from Theodore Ts'o during the Tanenbaum–Torvalds debate

=== Email signatures in business ===
Businesses often automatically append signature blocks to messages—or have policies mandating a certain style. Generally they resemble standard business cards in their content—and often in their presentation—with company logos and sometimes even the exact appearance of a business card. In some cases, a vCard is automatically attached.

In addition to these standard items, email disclaimers of various sorts are often automatically appended. These are typically couched in legal jargon, but it is unclear what weight they have in law, and they are routinely lampooned.

Business emails may also use some signature block elements mandated by local laws:

- Germany requires companies to disclose their company name, registration number, place of registration etc. in email signatures, in any business-related emails.
- Ireland's Director of Corporate Enforcement requires all limited companies operating websites to disclose such information in their emails.
- The UK's ECommerce Regulations (reflecting EU law) require this information in all emails from limited companies. In England and Wales the case of Mehta v J Pereira Fernandes clarified that an email address header added to an email by the email application did not count as a signature for legal purposes, but
  A party can sign a document for the purposes of Section 4 [of the Statute of Frauds] by using his full name or his last name prefixed by some or all of his initials or using his initials, and possibly by using a pseudonym or a combination of letters and numbers (as can happen for example with a Lloyds slip scratch), providing always that whatever was used was inserted into the document in order to give, and with the intention of giving, authenticity to it.

While criticized by some as overly bureaucratic, these regulations only extend existing laws for paper business correspondence to email.

=== Standard delimiter ===
The Usenet news system standards say that a signature block is conventionally delimited from the body of the message by a single line consisting of exactly two hyphens, followed by a space, followed by the end of line (i.e., in C-notation: "-- \n"). This latter prescription goes by many names, including “dash dash space”, "sig dashes", "signature cut line", "sig-marker", "sig separator" and "signature delimiter". It allows software to automatically mark or remove the sig block as the receiver desires.

-- 
Brad Templeton, publisher, ClariNet Communications Corp.         in...@clari.net
The net's #1 E-Newspaper (1,160,000 paid sbscrbrs.)  http://www.clari.net/brad/

— a real example from Brad Templeton posting in rec.humor.funny in 1995 showing sig dashes.

Most Usenet clients (including, for example, Mozilla Thunderbird) will recognize the signature block delimiter in a news article and will cut off the signature below it when inserting a quote of the original message into the composition window for a reply. Although the Usenet standards strictly apply only to Usenet news articles, this same delimiter convention is widely used in email messages as well, and email clients (such as Mozilla Thunderbird, Opera Mail, and Gmail) commonly use it for recognition and special handling of signatures in email.

== Internet forums ==
On web forums, the rules are often less strict on how a signature block is formatted, as Web browsers typically are not operated within the same constraints as text interface applications. Users will typically define their signature as part of their profile. Depending on the board's capabilities, signatures may range from a simple line or two of text to an elaborately constructed HTML piece. Images are often allowed as well, including dynamically updated images usually hosted remotely and modified by a server-side script. In some cases avatars or hackergotchis take over some of the role of signatures.

== FidoNet ==
With FidoNet, echomail and netmail software would often add an origin line at the end of a message. This would indicate the FidoNet address and name of the originating system (not the user). The user posting the message would generally not have any control over the origin line. However, single-line taglines, added under user control, would often contain a humorous or witty saying. Multi-line user signature blocks were rare.

However, a tearline standard for FidoNet was included in FTS-0004 and clarified in FSC-0068 as three dashes optionally followed by a space optionally followed by text.

== See also ==
- Acknowledgment (creative arts and sciences)
- Attribution (copyright)
- Byline
- Credit (creative arts)
- Kibo, a Usenet poster famous for his absurdly long signature
