= Mandatory disclaimer =

Mandatory disclaimers are government-mandated messages that describe what a product is not or does not do that sellers must include in their advertising.

In the United States, mandatory messages first appeared after the passage of the Federal Caustic Poisons Act (FCPA) of 1927, a law that ordered sellers of poisons to provide warning labels on their bottles. Prior to the passage of the FCPA, some sellers would use unusually shaped or colored bottles to signify the presence of a dangerous substance. After the Act, manufacturers mostly used plain bottles and displayed warning labels on them.

The agency responsible for enforcing the regulations of the FCPA was the Food and Drug Administration (FDA). Today, the FDA is the main body responsible for mandating disclaimers in the United States. Mandatory disclaimers are still used widely in the U.S.

The imposition of mandatory disclaimers is an exception to the First Amendment that was allowed by the Supreme Court of the United States in Valentine v. Christensen (1942). The exception to the First Amendment applies to commercial speech, which the Court defined as speech that “proposes a commercial transaction.”

Later cases have attempted to limit the extent of the “commercial speech" restriction on free speech, such as Virginia State Board of Pharmacy v. Virginia Citizens Consumer Council (1976) and Florida Bar v. Went For It (1995).

Voluntary disclaimers, however, have been used since the beginning of advertising. They lead to more persuasive advertising, and they provide useful information to consumers. Experimental studies suggest that mandatory disclaimers do not help buyers and may lead them to make inferior decisions.
