= Prosecution disclaimer =

Under United States patent law a prosecution disclaimer is a statement made by a patent applicant during examination of a patent application which can limit the scope of protection provided by the resulting patent. It is one type of file-wrapper estoppel, the other being prosecution history estoppel.

== In practice ==
Whenever an applicant makes a clear and unambiguous argument that a claim does not cover a certain feature, this argument becomes binding on the applicant and the applicant cannot later argue in court that the claim would cover such a feature. Coverage of that feature is considered "disclaimed" by the applicant and cannot be recovered. The scope of the resulting patent is narrower than it might be if the applicant had said nothing.

Prosecution disclaimer ensures that an applicant cannot obtain a patent by arguing that its claimed invention is narrow, and then turn around and enforce that patent against competitors with an argument that it is broader.

== Historical basis and case law ==
Prosecution disclaimer is a common law doctrine that originates in federal court precedent. One discussion and example of prosecution disclaimer is made in the Federal Circuit case Southwall Techs. Inc. v. Cardinal IG Co. This case also cites several other Federal Circuit cases dealing with prosecution disclaimer.

In Southwall, the Court was explicit in defining the principle: "The prosecution history limits the interpretation of claim terms so as to exclude any interpretation that was disclaimed during prosecution". The Court used the principal to prevent the patentee from arguing an interpretation of "sputter deposited dielectric" that would allow it to continue with a patent infringement suit, because the argument was inconsistent with its position during prosecution.

The Court also noted that a given claim term must be interpreted consistently across all claims. Once a term has been given a specific meaning with regard to one claim, the same meaning applies to all claims that include that term.

Another Federal Circuit case using the term "disclaimer" is Standard Oil Co. v. American Cyanamid Co. In Standard Oil, the Court stated that "the prosecution history (or file wrapper) limits the interpretation of claims so as to exclude any interpretation that may have been disclaimed or disavowed during prosecution in order to obtain claim allowance."

== Jurisdictions other than the United States ==
The doctrine of prosecution disclaimer does not exist in other jurisdictions, such as Europe. In those jurisdictions, claim language stands on its own without reference to the prosecution history of the application.

== Comparison with prosecution history estoppel ==
Unlike prosecution history estoppel, where claim amendments and arguments limit a patentee's ability to apply the doctrine of equivalents, prosecution disclaimer limits the literal scope of the claims and results from applicant argument, rather than amendments. In Loctite Corp. v. Ultraseal Ltd, the judge said that "interpreting claims in view of the prosecution history applies as a preliminary step in determining literal infringement. Prosecution history estoppel applies as a limitation to the doctrine of equivalents after the claims have been properly interpreted and no literal infringement is found".

Even if the literal scope of a claim is narrowed by prosecution disclaimer, the doctrine of equivalents may still be available for the claim terms at issue.

== See also ==
- Disclaimer (patent)
