= Catnic Components Ltd v Hill & Smith Ltd =

Catnic Components Ltd. v. Hill & Smith Ltd
- Citation: [1982] R.P.C. 183

Catnic Components Ltd. v. Hill & Smith Ltd. [1982] R.P.C. 183 is a leading House of Lords decision on the nature of a patent and in particular the methods of claim construction.

== Background ==
Catnic Components had a patent for a steel lintel, used to provide structural support over a door or window opening in a brick wall. The lintel is hollow, being made from sheet steel pressed into a rectangular or trapezoidal shape with a wind to anchor the device to the surrounding brickwork. Part of the specification required a bar to "extend vertically". Hill & Smith created a virtually identical invention that had a bar that extended at an upwards slant, only 6 or 8 degrees from being completely vertical. Despite the difference the device worked entirely in the same way as Catnic's invention.

Catnic sued for patent infringement. At trial, the judge held there was an infringement under the "pith and marrow" doctrine. The Court of Appeal of England and Wales overturned the ruling as it held that the "vertical" requirement was an exact and essential element of the patent. The Law Lords reversed the decision of the Court of Appeal, finding that there was an infringement, and affirmed the use of purposive construction in patent interpretation.

== Opinion of the Court ==
Lord Diplock held that a patent must be read in a "purposive" manner that focuses on the essential features of the patent. He famously stated:

My Lords, a patent specification is a unilateral statement by the patentee, in words of his own choosing, addressed to those likely to have a practical interest in the subject matter of his invention (i.e. "skilled in the art"), by which he informs them what he claims to be the essential features of the new product or process for which the letters patent grant him a monopoly. It is called "pith and marrow" of the claim. A patent specification should be given a purposive construction rather than a purely literal one derived from applying to it the kind of meticulous verbal analysis in which lawyers are too often tempted by their training to indulge. The question in each case is: whether persons with practical knowledge and experience of the kind of work in which the invention was intended to be used, would understand that strict compliance with a particular descriptive word or phrase appearing in a claim was intended by the patentee to be an essential requirement of the invention so that any variant would fall outside the monopoly claimed, even though it could have no material effect upon the way the invention worked.

== See also ==
- Doctrine of equivalents
- Improver v Remington (1990)
- Kirin-Amgen v Hoechst Marion Roussel (2004)
