= Kirin-Amgen Inc v Hoechst Marion Roussel Ltd =

Kirin-Amgen, Inc. v Hoechst Marion Roussel Ltd
- Full case name: Kirin-Amgen Inc and others (Appellants) v. Hoechst Marion Roussel Limited and others (Respondents). Kirin-Amgen Inc and others (Respondents) v. Hoechst Marion Roussel Limited and others (Appellants) (Conjoined Appeals)
- Citation: [2004] UKHL 46
- Transcript: HL judgment COA judgment

Court membership
- Judges sitting: Lord Hoffmann, Lord Hope of Craighead, Lord Rodger of Earlsferry, Lord Walker of Gestingthorpe, Lord Brown of Eaton-under-Heywood

Kirin-Amgen, Inc. v Hoechst Marion Roussel Ltd. is a decision by the House of Lords of England and Wales. The judgment was issued on 21 October 2004 and relates to the scope to be accorded to patent claims, including the doctrine of equivalents. The case and subsequent judgment affirmed principles from a prior case, Catnic Components Ltd. v. Hill & Smith Ltd.

The issue was whether the claims of a European patent granted to Kirin-Amgen, Inc. were infringed by Transkaryotic Therapies Inc. ("TKT") and Hoechst Marion Roussel Ltd in a situation where there was a remarkable similarity between the technologies employed by the two parties for producing the hormone erythropoietin. Infringement was not found due to the language used in the claims of the Amgen patent.

The reasoning in the judgment has presently formed a basis for the current practice of the UK Intellectual Property Office, and other countries that take great consideration of the legal implications of British case law when assessing whether a patent has been infringed by a device or process which is equivalent to the patented invention under the doctrine of equivalents.

== Background ==
Kirin-Amgen, Inc. ("Amgen"), a Californian pharmaceutical company, was the proprietor of EP 0148605 relating to the production of the glycoprotein hormone erythropoietin (EPO) by recombinant DNA technology. Amgen sued Transkaryotic Therapies, Inc. for patent infringement. TKT, a Massachusetts corporation, had also developed a method of making EPO using a process of gene activation. Hoechst Marion Roussel Ltd ("Hoechst") was sued for proposing to import TKT's EPO into the United Kingdom. EPO, a previously known glycoprotein hormone, is made in the kidney and stimulates the production of red blood cells by the bone marrow.

=== Kirin-Amgen's invention versus TKT's invention ===
The Amgen team succeeded for the first time in establishing the correct sequence of the amino acid residues in the EPO gene which coded for human EPO and its leader sequence. The Amgen patent addressed introducing this newly characterised gene into another organism (a self-replicating unicellular organism such as bacteria, yeast or mammalian cells in culture). The result was that the existing machinery for gene expression in the transfected microbial host cells operated to construct the desired product, EPO. The Amgen technique described using exogenous DNA as a template for transcription of mRNA which is then translated into a continuous sequence of amino acid residues within the transformed microbial host cells.

In TKT's gene activation method, the EPO is expressed in a human cell by an endogenous gene that is naturally present but typically dormant, or by cells derived by replication from such a cell. The TKT technique involved introducing the necessary control sequence into the DNA within a human cell upstream from the latent EPO gene. This different exogenous control sequence DNA had to be inserted into the human DNA at exactly the right point upstream of the EPO gene to enable it to activate or "switch-on" the inherent EPO gene in a human cell, which would not ordinarily express the EPO glycoprotein.

The essential difference between Amgen's EPO and TKT's EPO (which are chemically identical) is that the former is made by an exogenous DNA sequence coding for EPO that had been introduced into a host cell; and the latter is made by an endogenous DNA sequence coding for EPO in a human cell into which an exogenous promoter sequence has been inserted. However, the technique of inserting a promoter sequence to transform microbial host cells to construct a desired product was not generally known at the time that the Amgen patent application was published, and was not addressed in the Amgen patent specification or claims.

=== Infringement ===
The principal issue in the case was whether TKT's EPO fell outside the claims of Amgen's patent suit because of the difference in the way it was made.

The key Amgen claims in issue can be summarised as:

- (1) a DNA sequence for use in securing the expression of EPO in a host cell,
- (19) EPO which is characterised by being the product of eukaryotic expression of an exogenous DNA sequence with further characteristics that made it different from pre-existing EPO, and
- (26) EPO which is the product of the expression in a host cell of a DNA sequence according to claim 1.

Only claims 19 and 26 were alleged to have been infringed because TKT did not make any of its EPO in the UK. The alleged infringement was by importation. Claim 26 cannot be understood without interpretation of claim 1.

=== Amgen's claims ===
Amgen's asserted Claims were expressly as follows:

1. A DNA sequence for use in securing expression in a prokaryotic or eukaryotic host cell of a polypeptide product having at least part of the primary structural [conformation] of that of erythropoietin to allow possession of the biological property of causing bone marrow cells to increase production of reticulocytes and red blood cells and to increase haemoglobin synthesis or iron uptake, said DNA sequence selected from the group consisting of:

(a) the DNA sequences set out in Tables V and VI or their complementary strands; (b) DNA sequences which hybridize under stringent conditions to the protein-coding regions of the DNA sequences defined in (a) or fragments thereof; and (c) DNA sequences which, but for the degeneracy of the genetic code, would hybridize to the DNA sequences defined in (a) and (b).

19. A recombinant polypeptide having part or all of the primary structural conformation of human or monkey erythropoietin as set forth in Table VI or Table V or any allelic variant or derivative thereof possessing the biological property of causing bone marrow cells to increase production of reticulocytes and red blood cells to increase haemoglobin synthesis or iron uptake and characterised by being the product of eukaryotic expression of an exogenous DNA sequence and which has a higher molecular weight by SDS-PAGE from erythropoietin isolated from urinary sources.

26. A polypeptide product of the expression in a eukaryotic host cell of a DNA sequence according to any of claims 1, 2, 3, 5, 6 and 7.

Claims 2, 3, 5, 6 and 7 were all dependent on claim 1 in the sense that if the TKT method did not involve using a "DNA sequence for use in securing expression (of EPO) in a…host cell" within the meaning of Claim 1, then TKT would not infringe any of the other claims either.

=== The law ===
Prior to the UK Patents Act 1977, which gave effect to the European Patent Convention ("EPC") in the UK, the extent of protection conferred by a patent was governed by the common law, the terms of the royal grant and general principles of construction of documents. Lord Diplock expounded his new principles of "purposive construction" in the leading case of Catnic Components Ltd. v. Hill & Smith Ltd., in respect of a patent granted before 1977. After the UK Patents Act 1977 the extent of protection conferred by a UK-EPC patent was governed by specific EPC provisions. Article 84 of the EPC specifies the role of the claims in an application to the European Patent Office for a European patent as follows:

The claims shall define the matter for which protection is sought. They shall be clear and concise and be supported by the description.

Article 69 of the EPC, which applies to infringement proceedings for a European patent in the domestic courts of all EPC Contracting States provides:

The extent of the protection conferred by a European patent or a European patent application shall be determined by the terms of the claims. Nevertheless, the description and drawings shall be used to interpret the claims.

And a further "Protocol on the Interpretation of Article 69" reads as follows:

Article 69 should not be interpreted in the sense that the extent of the protection conferred by a European patent is to be understood as that defined by the strict, literal meaning of the wording used in the claims, the description and drawings being employed only for the purpose of resolving an ambiguity found in the claims. Neither should it be interpreted in the sense that the claims serve only as a guideline and that the actual protection conferred may extend to what, from a consideration of the description and drawings by a person skilled in the art, the patentee has contemplated. On the contrary, it is to be interpreted as defining a position between these extremes which combines a fair protection for the patentee with a reasonable degree of certainty for third parties.

Before the EPC came into effect, and until the House of Lords decision in Catnic, the words and grammar of a patent claim, in the absence of ambiguity, were to be given their natural and ordinary meaning. That is to say, they were to be given the meanings assigned to the words by a dictionary and to the syntax by a grammar. This meaning was to be adopted regardless of the context or background against which the words were used unless the words used were "ambiguous"; i.e., capable of having more than one meaning. The previous law was declared by Lord Porter in Electric & Musical Industries Ltd v Lissen Ltd (1938) 56 RPC 23, 57 as follows:

If the Claims have a plain meaning in themselves, then advantage cannot be taken of the language used in the body of the Specification to make them mean something different.

Lord Diplock changed this principle in the House of Lords decision in Catnic Components Ltd v Hill & Smith Ltd [1982] RPC 183, 243 when he said that the new British approach to contract interpretation should also be applied to the construction of patent claims. He summarises this as: "A patent specification should be given a purposive construction rather than a purely literal one", where "purposive construction" means understanding language in accordance with what a reasonable person would understand the author to be using the words to mean.

"Purposive construction" as applied to patent claims does not mean extending or going beyond the definition of the technical matter for which the patentee seeks protection in the claims. The question is always what the person skilled in the art would have understood the patentee to be using the language of the claim to mean. There is no presumption about the width of the claims. A patent may, for one reason or another, claim less than it teaches or enables.

By way of contrast, the effect of the doctrine of equivalents under United States law is to extend protection to something outside the claims which performs substantially the same function in substantially the same way to obtain the same result.

Lord Diplock preferred to adopt a principle of construction which actually gave effect to what the person skilled in the art would have understood the patentee to be claiming. Subsequently, Article 69 of the EPC has confirmed that there can be no patent protection under UK law which extends protection outside the scope of the claims, so interpreted.

The Protocol requires a UK court, in interpreting patent claims, to reconcile the objectives of giving a Patentee the full extent of the monopoly which the person skilled in the art would think he was intending to claim, without giving the patentee more than the full extent of the monopoly which the person skilled in the art would think that he was intending to claim. In other words, a Patentee is to be bound by his claims, properly understood. This means giving the patentee the full extent, but not more than the full extent, of the monopoly which a reasonable person skilled in the art, reading the claims in context, would think he was intending to claim.

A corresponding United States decision which may represent the beginning of a similar tendency is Phillips v. AWH (CAFC 2005, en banc), 415 F.3d 1303 (Fed. Cir. 2005), cert. denied, 126 S. Ct. 1332 (2006). The principal question in that case was the extent to which a court should resort to the patent specification in seeking to ascertain the proper scope of its claims. The conclusion was that claims should definitely be read in the context of the specification. In passing, the court cited Bates v Coe 98 US 31, 38 (1878), but otherwise does not focus on the intent of a Patentee, as discernible from a patent specification.

[I]n case of doubt or ambiguity it is proper in all cases to refer back to the descriptive portions of the specification to aid in solving the doubt or in ascertaining that true intent and meaning of the language employed in the claims.

For UK-EPC patents, while Article 69 prevents equivalence from extending protection outside the claims, equivalence can be an important part of the background of facts known to the skilled person which would affect what he understood the claims to mean. This is also expressly provided by the new Article 2 added to the Protocol by the Munich Act revising the EPC, dated 29 November 2000 (which entered into force on 13 December 2007):

(2) For the purpose of determining the extent of protection conferred by a European patent, due account shall be taken of any element which is equivalent to an element specified in the claims.

The principles that Lord Diplock offered in the Catnic case were summarized by Lord Hoffmann in Improver Corporation v Remington Consumer Products Ltd [1990] FSR 181, 189 in terms of the three Improver principles or test procedures. Lord Hoffmann in that same decision observed that a patentee may have intended a word or phrase to have not a literal but rather a figurative meaning, the figure being a form of synecdoche - (a form of the metaphor in which the part mentioned signifies the whole); or metonymy (a form of metaphor denoting the relation between two objects. Metonymy is to synecdoche what a metaphor is to a simile).

The Catnic decision established the "Catnic principle": the principle of purposive construction, but it also provided guidelines for applying that principle to equivalents. Those principles are encapsulated in the Protocol questions. However, the principle of purposive construction is the bedrock of patent construction, universally applicable. The guidelines are only guidelines, more useful in some cases than in others.

== Opinion of the court ==
=== Composition of the court ===
The case was heard by five sitting Lords of Appeal in Ordinary:

- Lord Hoffmann
- Lord Hope of Craighead
- Lord Rodger of Earlsferry
- Lord Walker of Gestingthorpe, and
- Lord Brown of Eaton-under-Heywood

=== The Amgen decision on its facts ===
Interpreting the claims of the Amgen patent in the context of its specification, the claims are concerned with the expression of EPO by a gene which is exogenous to the cell. But the genes which express EPO in cells by the TKT process are not exogenous. They come into existence when the cell is formed by division and simply replicate the pre-existing genes already present in the TKT cells. The TKT process works by a technique not generally known at the time when the Amgen patent application was published.

A claim may, upon its proper construction, cover products or processes which involve the use of technology unknown at the time the claim was drafted. The question is whether the person skilled in the art would understand the description in a way which was sufficiently general to include the new technology.

Lord Hoffmann concluded that TKT did not infringe any of the claims and dismissed Amgen's appeal. The other lords all agreed.

== Consequences ==
This case affirmed that: "Construction is objective in the sense that it is concerned with what a reasonable person to whom the utterance was addressed would have understood the author to be using the words to mean. Notice, however, that it is not, as is sometimes said, "the meaning of the words the author used", but rather what the notional addressee would have understood the author to mean by using those words." (Paragraph 32 of the judgement)

It is a common misunderstanding that the words of the claims should be understood as what the author used them to mean. This is not the case. Rather, the claims should be understood as what a skilled person (at the date of filing of the application) would have understood the author to be using the words to mean.

Additionally, if a claim is intended to cover products or processes which involve the use of technology unknown at the time the claim was drafted, then the patent specification and claims based thereon should be drafted so that a person skilled in the art would understand the description in a way which was sufficiently general to include the new technology.

== See also ==
- Doctrine of equivalents
- Improver v. Remington
- Catnic Components Ltd. v. Hill & Smith Ltd.
