= Doctrine of equivalents =

Concept in patent law

The doctrine of equivalents is a legal rule in many (but not all) of the world's patent systems that allows a court to hold a party liable for patent infringement if the infringing device or process does not fall within the literal scope of a patent claim but is nevertheless equivalent to the claimed invention. In the United States, Judge Learned Hand has described its purpose as being "to temper unsparing logic and prevent an infringer from stealing the benefit of the invention."

== Standards for determining equivalents ==
=== Germany ===
German courts typically apply a three-step test known as Schneidmesser's questions:

1. Does the variant solve the problem underlying the invention with means that objectively have the same effect?
2. Would the person skilled in the art, using the common general knowledge, have realised at the priority date that the variant has the same effect?
3. Are the considerations which the skilled person takes into account for the variant in the light of the meaning of the invention close enough to the considerations taken into account for the literal solution protected by the claims, such that the skilled person will consider the variant as a solution which is equivalent to the literal one?

All of the above questions need to be answered in the affirmative in order to demonstrate equivalent infringement. In addition, an allegation of equivalent infringement needs to withstand the Formstein test. The corresponding question reads:

Does the variant, having regard to the state of the art, lack novelty or is the variant obvious to a person skilled in the art?

=== Ireland ===
Ireland appears to subscribe to a doctrine of equivalents. In Farbwerke Hoechst v Intercontinental Pharmaceuticals (Eire) Ltd (1968), a case involving a patent of a chemical process, the High Court found that the defendant had infringed the plaintiff's patent despite the fact that the defendant had substituted the starting material specified in the patent claim for another material. Expert evidence showed that any technician who failed to obtain a good result using the specified starting material would try the replacement material. The two materials were therefore held to be chemically equivalent, and the replacement of one with the other by the defendant did not prevent a finding and injunction against him.

=== Switzerland ===
On 21 March 2013, the Federal Patent Court of Switzerland adopted an approach similar to the three-prong test applied in Germany. The court based its decision on the three questions:

1. Do the replaced features have the same objective function (same effect)?
2. Are the replaced features and their same objective function obvious to a person skilled in the art on the basis of the teaching of the patent (accessibility)?
3. After reading the wording of the claim in light of the description, would a person skilled in the art consider the replaced features as a solution of equal value (equal value)?

The court denied equivalent infringement of EP0918791B3, since paragraph 19 of EP0918791B3 explicitly teaches that toxic chromium compounds may be replaced by metallic catalysts. A person skilled in the art would not consider the organic catalyst TEMPO as a solution of equal value to the ruthenium salts specified in claim 1. The answer to the third question was negative.

The court also ruled that there was equivalent infringement of EP1149840B1, since all questions of the three-prong test were answered in the affirmative. The court set forth that the replacement of the claimed p-Toluenesulfonic acid with pyridine/water constituted basic knowledge taught during the first years of an undergraduate course in organic chemistry.

In Urinal valve II, the Federal Supreme Court of Switzerland basically affirmed the three-prong test applied by the Federal Patent Court. The Supreme Court still partly reversed the Federal Patent Court’s earlier ruling on case O2014_002. The Supreme Court contended (reasons 6.4) that a second embodiment of the urinal valve fully implemented the key teachings of the asserted patent EP1579133, even though the second embodiment was not literally covered by the wording of the relevant claim. The Court went on to establish equivalent infringement.

=== United Kingdom ===
The UK approach to infringement that does not fall within the literal wording of a patent claim has varied over the years.

==== History ====
Until the 1960s, an act could be considered infringing if it either fell within the literal wording of the claim (“textual infringement”) or was something that the courts considered to be a "mechanical equivalent." That wording was found to cause problems in some cases, and gradually the courts built up a complex body of case law whereby an act that was not a textual infringement could nevertheless be caught if the alleged infringer had taken what the courts came to call the "pith and marrow" of the invention.

In 1963, Van der Lely v Bamfords was decided by the House of Lords. Their Lordships took the view that if the patentees had deliberately framed their claim in such way as to exclude the alleged infringing act, then they should be held to the wording they had chosen. The "pith and marrow" doctrine should not be applied so as to extend the scope of a carefully-worded claim and should in the future apply only to cases of "colourable evasion of patent claims."

The much stricter approach to claim construction became open to review after 1977, when the UK joined the European Patent Convention (EPC). Under the Protocol on the Interpretation of Article 69, the Convention required the UK courts to maintain a balance between interpreting patent claims with strict literalism (the description and drawings being used only to resolve ambiguity) and regarding the claims as a mere guideline.

In Catnic Components Ltd v Hill & Smith Ltd (1982) the House of Lords swept away all of the earlier case law on "mechanical equivalents” and "pith and marrow", and held that a patent specification should be given a “purposive construction” rather than a purely literal one. The question to be asked should be whether a skilled person reading the patent would understand that strict compliance with a word or phrase within the claim was intended by the patentee to be an essential requirement, even if it could have no material effect upon the way the invention worked.

The specific questions used by the courts to achieve the required “purposive construction” settled into stable form with Improver v Remington (1990) and the House of Lords decision in Kirin-Amgen (2004). These so-called Improver (or Protocol) questions became a widely used three-step test for determining non-literal patent infringement.

==== Current law ====
In 2007 the EPC was revised as EPC 2000. This amended the Protocol on the Interpretation of Article 69 to require the courts of all contracting states, including the UK, to take due account when considering infringement "of any element which is an equivalent to an element specified in the claims".

In 2017, Lord Neuberger in Actavis UK v Eli Lilly held that the Protocol questions should be revised. The correct questions to ask when determining whether there has been non-literal infringement, according to the Supreme Court, should now be

1. "Notwithstanding that it is not within the literal meaning of the relevant claim(s) of the patent, does the variant achieve substantially the same result in substantially the same way as the invention, ie the inventive concept revealed by the patent?"
2. "Would it be obvious to the person skilled in the art, reading the patent at the priority date, but knowing that the variant achieves substantially the same result as the invention, that it does so in substantially the same way as the invention?"
3. "Would such a reader of the patent have concluded that the patentee nonetheless intended that strict compliance with the literal meaning of the relevant claim(s) of the patent was an essential requirement of the invention?"

In order to establish infringement in a case where there is no literal infringement, a patentee must establish that the answer to the first two questions is “yes” and that the answer to the third is “no”.

=== United States ===
The United States also has both statutory equivalents doctrine that is codified in 35 U.S.C. § 112 ¶ 6, which extends to equivalents available at patent's issuance, and a more general (non-statutory, created by courts) doctrine of equivalents, which extends to technological equivalents developed after the patent is granted. Notably, the doctrine of equivalence can be applied even to means-plus-function claims. The proposed equivalents also cannot cover, or ensnare, the prior art.

In American practice, the doctrine of equivalents analysis is applied to individual claim limitations, not to the invention as a whole. The legal test, articulated in Warner-Jenkinson Co. v. Hilton Davis Chem. Co. (1997), is whether the difference between the feature in the accused device and the limitation literally recited in the patent claim is "insubstantial."

One way of determining whether a difference is "insubstantial" or not is called the "triple identity" test. Under the triple-identity test, the difference between the feature in the accused device and the limitation literally recited in the patent claim may be found to be "insubstantial" if the feature in the accused device:

1. Performs substantially the same function
2. In substantially the same way
3. To obtain the same result

as the limitation literally recited in the patent claim.

The Court also explained that the doctrine of equivalents applies if two elements are interchangeable and a person with ordinary skill in the art would have known that the elements were interchangeable at the time of infringement.

In the United States, the doctrine of equivalents is limited by both prosecution history estoppel and ensnarement. Under prosecution history estoppel, if the patentee abandoned through an amendment to the patent application certain literal claim coverage (e.g., by narrowing the literal scope of the patent claim), then the patentee is estopped from later arguing that the surrendered coverage is insubstantially different from the literally claimed limitation. Under the doctrine of ensnarement, a patentee may not assert "a scope of equivalency that would encompass, or ensnare, the prior art." Also, based on the public dedication principle (also known as the disclosure dedication rule), a patentee may not invoke the doctrine of equivalents to recapture subject matter disclosed but not claimed in a patent.

== Harmonization attempts ==
Attempts have been made to harmonize the doctrine of equivalents.

For instance, Article 21(2) of 1991 WIPO's "Basic Proposal" for a Treaty Supplementing the Paris Convention states:

"(a) (...) a claim shall be considered to cover not only all the elements as expressed in the claim but also equivalents.
(b) An element ("the equivalent element") shall generally be considered as being equivalent to an element as expressed in a claim if, at the time of any alleged infringement, either of the following conditions is fulfilled in regard to the invention as claimed:

(i) the equivalent element performs substantially the same function in substantially the same way and produces substantially the same result as the element as expressed in the claim, or
(ii) it is obvious to a person skilled in the art that the same result as that achieved by means of the element as expressed in the claim can be achieved by means of the equivalent element."

The EPC 2000, which came into effect on 13 December 2007, included an amended "Protocol on the interpretation of Article 69 EPC" intended to bring about uniformity at a national level between contracting states to the EPC when interpreting claims. The amended text reads:

For the purpose of determining the extent of protection conferred by a European patent, due account shall be taken of any element which is an equivalent to an element specified in the claims.

However, no definition of what was meant by an "equivalent" was included in the Protocol and it is expected that this lack of a binding definition will do little to achieve the desired uniform interpretation.

== Landmark decisions ==
- Germany
  - Batteriekastenschnur decision
  - Formstein defence
  - Schneidmesser decision
- Switzerland
  - Drospirenon decision
- United Kingdom
  - Catnic Components Ltd. v. Hill & Smith Ltd. (1982)
  - Kirin-Amgen v Hoechst Marion Roussel (2004)
  - Actavis v Eli Lilly, July 12, 2017, decision (2017) UKSC 48
- United States
  - Graver Tank & Manufacturing Co. v. Linde Air Products Co., (1950)
  - Warner-Jenkinson Co. v. Hilton Davis Chem. Co. (1997)
  - Festo Corp. v. Shoketsu Kinzoku Kogyo Kabushiki Co., both Federal Circuit and Supreme Court decisions
  - Honeywell International v Hamilton Sundstrand Corp.(doc)
