= Improver Corp v Remington Consumer Product Ltd =

Improver Corporation v Remington Consumer Product Limited
- Citation: [1990] F.S.R. 181

Improver Corporation v Remington Consumer Product Limited [1990] F.S.R. 181 is a leading United Kingdom case on patent infringement, particularly in relation to how to establish what specifically a patent covers.

== The Catnic Decision ==
The earlier case of Catnic Components Ltd. v Hill & Smith Ltd., Lord Diplock had established the principle that patents were to be read in a "purposive" manner. The question to be answered in establishing infringement, as formulated by Lord Diplock, was a complex, multi-part enquiry.

== The Improver Questions ==
In the Improver case, Hoffmann J. (as he then was), on behalf of the Patents Court, reformulated the test as a series of three questions to establish whether a variant (alleged infringing article) infringes the claims of a patent. The variant will not infringe if any of the following are true:

- The variant has a material effect on the way the invention works.
- The fact that the variant has no material effect on the way the invention works would not have been obvious to an expert in the field.
- That an expert in the field would have taken from the language used in the patent that strict compliance with the primary meaning was an essential requirement of the invention.

== Facts and findings of the case ==
In the Improver case, the patent covered a depilatory device having a curved "helical spring" driven by a motor. The spring when rotated gripped hairs between its coils and plucked them from the skin. The alleged infringement replaced the spring with a rubber rod having slits in its surface. The question was whether the slit rubber rod was "a helical spring". The judge answered the three questions as follows: (i) the change to a rubber rod had no material effect on the way the invention worked; and (ii) it would have been obvious to an expert that the rubber rod would work in the same way; but (iii) the expert would have understood from the patent that the patentee meant to confine his claim to a "helical spring", in its primary meaning and not in a wide generic sense. For this last reason, the rubber rod did not infringe.

== Continued relevance ==
These so-called "Improver questions" were relied on throughout the 1990s and early 2000s by the United Kingdom Courts, but in 2004 their continued relevance was called into question by the same judge who had formulated them, now Lord Hoffmann, in the case of Kirin-Amgen v Hoechst Marion Roussel:

These questions, which the Court of Appeal in Wheatly v Drillsafe Ltd [2001] RPC 133, 142 dubbed "the Protocol questions" have been used by English courts for the past fifteen years as a framework for deciding whether equivalents fall within the scope of the claims. On the whole, the judges appear to have been comfortable with the results, although some of the cases have exposed the limitations of the method. When speaking of the "Catnic principle" it is important to distinguish between, on the one hand, the principle of purposive construction which I have said gives effect to the requirements of the Protocol, and on the other hand, the guidelines for applying that principle to equivalents, which are encapsulated in the Protocol questions. The former is the bedrock of patent construction, universally applicable. The latter are only guidelines, more useful in some cases than in others. I am bound to say that the cases show a tendency for counsel to treat the Protocol questions as legal rules rather than guides which will in appropriate cases help to decide what the skilled man would have understood the patentee to mean.

The current position, therefore, is that the House of Lords has held that the principle of purposive construction is entirely in accordance with the Protocol to Article 69, but that the Improver questions may not represent the best approach for dealing with every infringement issue. See Kirin-Amgen v Hoechst Marion Roussel.

== Foreign relevance ==
The Improver decision was cited with approval by the Supreme Court of Canada in its landmark 2000 Free World Trust v Électro Santé Inc decision. The Improver Questions continue to be relevant for the analysis of essentiality under Canadian law.
