= Email disclaimer =

An email disclaimer is a disclaimer, notice or warning which is added to an outgoing email and forms a distinct section which is separate from the main message. The reasons for adding such a disclaimer include confidentiality, copyright, contract formation, defamation, discrimination, harassment, privilege and viruses.

== Issues frequently dealt with in email disclaimers ==
=== Confidentiality ===
A disclaimer may be added to mitigate the risk that a confidential email may be forwarded to a third-party recipient. Organizations may use the disclaimer to warn such recipients that they are not authorised recipients and to ask that they delete the email. The legal force and standing of such warnings is not well-established.

=== Contract ===
A disclaimer may state that the email does not form a contract. This may not be effective as the substantive body of the email may contradict and override this. In the case of Baillie Estates Limited against Du Pont (UK) Limited, which was heard in the Outer House of Scotland, it was found that a contract was in effect, as attached to the relevant email, even though there was a standard disclaimer.

=== Copyright ===
Republication of emails may be protected by copyright law and a disclaimer may warn that such rights to copy the text of the email are reserved by the originator.

=== Viruses ===
Computer viruses may be spread by email. To mitigate the risk that a recipient might sue the sender of an infected email, a disclaimer might warn of the possibility of infection and advise the recipient to conduct their own scan. The disclaimer might provide details of the outgoing scanning which has already been performed to provide some guidance about the level of risk.

== Effectiveness of disclaimers ==
The Economist published an article asserting that disclaimers are presented largely as a result of imitation and habit, that people have long stopped paying attention to disclaimers, and suggested that they may not be legally enforceable.

In the United States, the overuse of boilerplate disclaimers by law firms has been criticized as potentially rendering the disclaimers ineffective. With little case law addressing email disclaimers, concerns remain that the use of a disclaimer provides little or no benefit to an attorney or any other person who misdirects an email that contains privileged or confidential information. If the recipient of a misdirected email is not bound to a confidentiality agreement, the inclusion of a disclaimer has no binding effect upon that person.

In the EU, there is a directive that instructs courts to strike unreasonable provisions of consumer contracts that have not been freely negotiated by the consumer.

== Length and other awards ==
The Register conducted a survey in 2001 and found that UBS Warburg had the longest disclaimer — 1,081 words. Other categories in their Email Disclaimer Awards included the Most Incomprehensible Disclaimer and the Most PC Disclaimer.
