= Sığdaş =

- Municipality
- Location within Azerbaijan
- Coordinates: 38°57′23″N 48°36′47″E
- Country: Azerbaijan
- Rayon: Masally

Population
  - Total: 1,474
- Time zone: UTC+4 (AZT)
  - Summer (DST): UTC+5 (AZT)

Sığdaş (also, Sigdash and Sygdash) is a village and municipality in the Masally Rayon of Azerbaijan. It has a population of 1,474.
