= Declaratory judgment =

Legal determination of the rights, duties, or obligations of parties to a civil dispute

A declaratory judgment, also called a declaration, is the legal determination of a court that resolves legal uncertainty for the litigants. It is a form of legally binding preventive by which a party involved in an actual or possible legal matter can ask a court to conclusively rule on and affirm the rights, duties, or obligations of one or more parties in a civil dispute (subject to any appeal). The declaratory judgment is generally considered a statutory remedy and not an equitable remedy in the United States, and is thus not subject to equitable requirements, though there are analogies that can be found in the remedies granted by courts of equity. A declaratory judgment does not by itself order any action by a party, or imply damages or an injunction, although it may be accompanied by one or more other remedies.

A declaratory judgment is generally distinguished from an advisory opinion because the latter does not resolve an actual case or controversy. Declaratory judgments can provide legal certainty to each party in a matter when this could resolve or assist in a disagreement. Often an early resolution of legal rights will resolve some or all of the other issues in a matter.

A declaratory judgment is typically requested when a party is threatened with a lawsuit but the lawsuit has not yet been filed; or when a party or parties believe that their rights under law and/or contract might conflict; or as part of a counterclaim to prevent further lawsuits from the same plaintiff (for example, when only a contract claim is filed, but a copyright claim might also be applicable). In some instances, a declaratory judgment is filed because the statute of limitations against a potential defendant may pass before the plaintiff incurs damage (for example, a malpractice statute applicable to a certified public accountant may be shorter than the time period the IRS has to assess a taxpayer for additional tax due to bad advice given by the CPA).

Declaratory judgments are authorized by statute in most common-law jurisdictions. In the United States, the federal government and most states enacted statutes in the 1920s and 1930s authorizing their courts to issue declaratory judgments.

== Cease and desist ==
The filing of a declaratory judgment lawsuit can follow the sending by one party of a cease-and-desist letter to another party. A party contemplating sending such a letter risks that the recipient, or a party related to the recipient (i.e. such as a customer or supplier), may file for a declaratory judgment in their own jurisdiction, or sue for minor damages in the law of unjustified threats. This may require the sender to appear in a distant court, at their own expense. So sending a cease-and-desist letter presents a dilemma to the sender, as it would be desirable to be able to address the issues at hand in a candid manner without the need for litigation. Upon receiving a cease-and-desist letter, the recipient may seek a tactical advantage by instituting declaratory-judgment litigation in a more favorable jurisdiction.

Sometimes the parties agree in advance of discussions that no declaratory-judgment lawsuit will be filed while the negotiations are continuing. Sometimes a lawsuit is filed, but not served, before sending such a notice, to preserve a jurisdiction advantage without engaging the judicial process fully. Some parties send cease-and-desist letters that make "an oblique suggestion of possible infringement" to lower the risk of the recipient filing a declaratory-judgment lawsuit.

== Declaratory judgment actions in patent litigation ==
Declaratory judgments are common in patent litigation, as well as in other areas of intellectual property litigation, because declaratory judgments allow an alleged infringer to "clear the air" about a product or service that may be a business's focal point. For example, in a typical patent-infringement claim, when a patent owner becomes aware of an infringer, the owner can simply wait until he pleases to bring an infringement suit. Meanwhile, the monetary damages continuously accrue – with no effort expended by the patent owner, apart from marking the patent number on products the patent owner sold or licensed. On the other hand, the alleged infringer could do nothing to rectify the situation if no declaratory judgment existed. The alleged infringer would be forced to continue to operate his business with the cloud of a lawsuit over his head. The declaratory-judgment procedure allows the alleged infringer to proactively bring suit to resolve the situation and eliminate the cloud of uncertainty looming overhead.

Common claims for declaratory judgment in patent cases are non-infringement, patent invalidity, and un-enforceability. To bring a claim for declaratory judgment in a situation where a patent dispute may exist or develop, the claimant must establish that an actual controversy exists. If there is a substantial controversy of sufficient immediacy and reality, the court will generally proceed with the declaratory-judgment action. The court may even hear the action if the patentee has not filed a cease and desist letter. The standard for an actual controversy was most recently addressed by the Supreme Court in MedImmune, Inc. v. Genentech, Inc., 549 U.S. 118 (2007). But even if an actual controversy exists, the declaratory-judgment statute is permissive—a district court, in its discretion, may decline to hear a declaratory-judgment action.

Usually the claimant is actually making, using, selling, offering to sell, or importing, or is prepared to actually make, use or sell, offer to sell or import an allegedly infringing device or method, and usually the patent owner has claimed that such activities by claimant will result in patent infringement. An express threat of litigation is not needed, nor is it a guarantee that jurisdiction will be granted. Some factors courts have considered in this analysis are whether a patent owner has asserted its rights against an alleged infringer in a royalty dispute, whether the owner has sued a customer of an alleged infringer, or whether an owner has made statements regarding its patents in trade magazines.

If a patent owner does suggest that there is patent coverage of what an alleged infringer is doing or planning to do, the alleged infringer may bring suit. The alleged infringer, as the plaintiff in the suit, can choose the venue subject to constitutional restrictions and the state long-arm statute of the forum in question. The suit can be brought in any forum if the local federal district court can properly obtain personal jurisdiction over the alleged infringer.

Defendants in infringement cases can ask for declaratory judgment as a counterclaim.

A counterclaim of infringement is a compulsory counterclaim to a claim for declaratory judgment of non-infringement. If a patent owner fails to assert an infringement counterclaim in a declaratory-judgment non-infringement suit, the patent infringement claim will be deemed waived.

== See also ==
- Arrow declaration
