= Person having ordinary skill in the art =

Concept in patent law

A person having ordinary skill in the art (PHOSITA), a person (of) ordinary skill in the art (POSITA or PSITA), a person skilled in the art, a skilled addressee or simply a skilled person is a legal fiction found in many patent laws throughout the world. This hypothetical person is considered to have the normal skills and knowledge in a particular technical field (an "art"), without being a genius. This measure mainly serves as a reference for determining, or at least evaluating, whether an invention is non-obvious or not (in U.S. patent law), or involves an inventive step or not (in European patent laws). If it would have been obvious for this fictional person to come up with the invention while starting from the prior art, then the particular invention is considered not patentable.

In some patent laws, the person skilled in the art is also used as a reference in the context of other criteria, for instance in order to determine whether an invention is sufficiently disclosed in the description of the patent or patent application (sufficiency of disclosure is a fundamental requirement in most patent laws), or in order to determine whether two technical means are equivalents when evaluating infringement (see also doctrine of equivalents).

In practice, this legal fiction is a set of legal fictions which evolved over time and which may be differently construed for different purposes. This legal fiction basically translates the need for each invention to be considered in the context of the technical field it belongs to.

== Canada ==
The Patent Act (R.S.C., 1985, c. P-4) makes explicit reference to a "person skilled in the art" in the s. 28.3 requirement that the subject matter of a patent be non-obvious.

28.3 The subject-matter defined by a claim in an application for a patent in Canada must be subject-matter that would not have been obvious on the claim date to a person skilled in the art or science to which it pertains...

The person skilled in the art is described in Beloit Canada Ltd. v. Valmet Oy:

the technician skilled in the art but having no scintilla of inventiveness or imagination; a paragon of deduction and dexterity, wholly devoid of intuition; a triumph of the left hemisphere over the right. The question to be asked is whether this mythical creature (the man in the Clapham omnibus of patent law) would, in the light of the state of the art and of common general knowledge as at the claimed date of invention, have come directly and without difficulty to the solution taught by the patent.

== European Patent Convention ==
The European Patent Convention (EPC) refers to the skilled person in Article 56 EPC and provides for that "an invention shall be considered as involving an inventive step if, having regard to the state of the art, it is not obvious to a person skilled in the art".

The EPC also refers to the skilled person in Article 83 EPC, which requires that "[t]he European patent application must disclose the invention in a manner sufficiently clear and complete for it to be carried out by a person skilled in the art".

Still further, the Protocol on the Interpretation of Article 69 EPC refers to the skilled person. Article 1, 2nd sentence, states that "[n]or should it [Article 69 EPC] be taken to mean that the claims serve only as a guideline and that the actual protection conferred may extend to what, from a consideration of the description and the drawings by a "person skilled in the art", the patent proprietor has contemplated".

The European Patent Office provides guidelines that set forth some of the skilled person's capabilities.

A related concept is the "business person", who is also a notional person. It is used at the EPO when assessing inventive step of an invention involving both technical and non-technical elements. The business person "represents an abstraction or shorthand for a separation of business considerations from technical".

== United States ==
A person having ordinary skill in the art is a legal fiction first codified in the Patent Act of 1952. The PHOSITA is a test of "obviousness" which is one of the largest gray areas in patent law. The concept was carried over into the Leahy–Smith America Invents Act:

A patent for a claimed invention may not be obtained, notwithstanding that the claimed invention is not identically disclosed as set forth in section 102, if the differences between the claimed invention and the prior art are such that the claimed invention as a whole would have been obvious before the effective filing date of the claimed invention to a person having ordinary skill in the art to which the claimed invention pertains. Patentability shall not be negated by the manner in which the invention was made.

The PHOSITA appears again in slightly different words in the provision requiring a proper disclosure:

The specification shall contain a written description of the invention, and of the manner and process of making and using it, in such full, clear, concise, and exact terms as to enable any person skilled in the art to which it pertains, or with which it is most nearly connected, to make and use the same, and shall set forth the best mode contemplated by the inventor or joint inventor of carrying out the invention.

=== Comparison ===
Quite similar to the logic of "reasonable person" used in the common law of torts as a test of negligence, the PHOSITA is a hypothetical individual, neither a genius nor a layperson, created in the mind of a patent examiner or the jury to see if a claimed invention is too obvious to be patented.

=== Creation ===
During the examination of a patent application, the examiner tries to find out if that invention has already been invented by another person. If so, the patent application will be returned to the applicant to be narrowed or modified. If not, the examiner will bring out the PHOSITA test to check if that invention is so obvious that people in the trade will invent it with or without patent applicant's efforts. In the end, if the examiner can not discover a piece of prior art that may lead the PHOSITA to the invention, the United States Patent and Trademark Office (USPTO) is required by statute to award that applicant a patent.

It is well known that it may take a few months or a couple of years for a paper to be published in a peer reviewed academic journal. The date of a sanctioned prior art can be a little later than the patent's application date:

Examiner properly relied upon prior art publication in rejecting claims for production of [certain antibodies] ... under [35 U.S.C. § 103], even though publication itself is not prior art against present claims, since publication establishes level of ordinary skill in art at and around time of present invention.

=== Capacity ===
The term "ordinary skill" is not rigidly defined.

Factors that may be considered in determining level of ordinary skill in the art include
- the educational level of the inventor;
- type of problems encountered in the art;
- prior art solutions to those problems;
- rapidity with which innovations are made;
- sophistication of the technology; and
- educational level of active workers in the field.

=== KSR v. Teleflex ===
The Supreme Court reversed a decision by the Court of Appeals for the Federal Circuit based on how the lower court defined the capabilities of a PHOSITA. KSR v. Teleflex was decided by a unanimous Supreme Court on April 30, 2007.

Importantly, Justice Anthony Kennedy's opinion stated, "A person of ordinary skill is also a person of ordinary creativity, not an automaton." Although the Court's opinion acknowledged other Federal Circuit cases that described a PHOSITA as having "common sense" and who could find motivation "implicitly in the prior art," Kennedy emphasized that his opinion was directed at correcting the "errors of law made by the Court of Appeals in this case" and does not necessarily overturn all other Federal Circuit precedents.

Once the PHOSITA is properly defined, KSR v. Teleflex described how obviousness should be determined:

In determining whether the subject matter of a patent claim is obvious, neither the particular motivation nor the avowed purpose of the patentee controls. What matters is the objective reach of the claim. If the claim extends to what is obvious, it is invalid under §103. One of the ways in which a patent's subject matter can be proved obvious is by noting that there existed at the time of invention a known problem for which there was an obvious solution encompassed by the patent's claims. This was applied to the facts before the Court with the following: The proper question to have asked was whether a pedal designer of ordinary skill, facing the wide range of needs created by developments in the field of endeavor, would have seen a benefit to upgrading Asano with a sensor.

== Elsewhere ==
Practically all patent legislations disallow the patentability of something obvious. The laws of some countries have similar formulations.

For example, the German Patent Act (Patentgesetz) requires that the invention "cannot be derived by a Fachmann from the state of the art in an obvious manner". The word Fachmann (an ordinary German word meaning somebody who has professional knowledge in a field) is made specific by ständiger Rechtsprechung (usual court opinion) as a "specialist with average knowledge and talent whom one would ordinarily ask to seek a solution for the (objective) problem the invention deals with"

== See also ==
- A moron in a hurry, a phrase that has been used in legal cases, especially in the UK, involving trademark infringement and passing off
- The man on the Bondi tram
- Objective historian
