= Warner-Jenkinson Co. v. Hilton Davis Chemical Co. =

Warner-Jenkinson Company, Inc. v. Hilton Davis Chemical Co.
- Supreme Court of the United States

Argued October 15, 1996 Decided March 3, 1997
- Full case name: Warner-Jenkinson Company, Incorporated, et al. v. Hilton Davis Chemical Company
- Citations: 520 U.S. 17 (more) 117 S. Ct. 1040; 137 L. Ed. 2d 146; 1997 U.S. LEXIS 1476; 65 U.S.L.W. 4162; 41 U.S.P.Q.2d (BNA) 1865; 97 Cal. Daily Op. Service 1540; 97 Daily Journal DAR 2249; 10 Fla. L. Weekly Fed. S 321
- Argument: Oral argument

Case history
- Prior: Hilton Davis Chem. Co. v. Warner-Jenkinson Co., 62 F.3d 1512 (Fed. Cir. 1995); cert. granted, 516 U.S. 1145 (1996).

Holding
- The Doctrine of Equivalents is consistent with the Patent Act of 1952, and patentees may attempt to prove that an amendment was not made to be limiting. Reversed and remanded.

Court membership
- Chief Justice William Rehnquist Associate Justices John P. Stevens · Sandra Day O'Connor; Antonin Scalia · Anthony Kennedy; David Souter · Clarence Thomas; Ruth Bader Ginsburg · Stephen Breyer

Case opinions
- Majority: Thomas, joined by unanimous
- Concurrence: Ginsburg, joined by Kennedy

Laws applied
- Patent Act of 1952

Warner-Jenkinson Company, Inc. v. Hilton Davis Chemical Co., 520 U.S. 17 (1997), was a United States Supreme Court decision in the area of patent law, affirming the continued vitality of the doctrine of equivalents while making some important refinements to the doctrine.

== Facts ==
The plaintiff Hilton Davis Chemical Co., a dyemaker, had developed an "ultrafiltration" process to purify dyes. An amendment to the patent had specified that a solution used in the process must have a pH level between 6.0 and 9.0. The amendment was filed in order to clarify that this patent did not overlap with a previously patented process that used a solution with a pH level above 9.0 - however, the plaintiff was unable to explain why the amendment stated a lower level of 6.0. The defendant had developed a process using a solution with a pH level of 5.0, which was outside the range of the plaintiff's patent.

The plaintiff sued for infringement, conceding that the defendant's process did not literally infringe, but relying on the doctrine of equivalents to support the claim of infringement. The defendant argued that the doctrine of equivalents was no longer appropriate for courts to use because Congress had made some changes to the patent statute after the Supreme Court's 1950 decision establishing the propriety of using the doctrine.

== Issue ==
Is the doctrine of equivalents still in force? How is the plaintiff's amendment to figure into the problem?

== Opinion ==
The Court, in an opinion by Justice Clarence Thomas, held that the doctrine of equivalents had not been eliminated by changes to the patent statute. Instead, the Court determined that the United States Congress would have explicitly stated that they were eliminating the doctrine if that was their intent. The Court enunciated a test for amendments, finding that if the plaintiff can prove the reason for the amendment was not to limit the patent, then infringement was still possible. The case was remanded to the trial court to determine if the plaintiff could explain his lower pH limit.

== Concurrence ==
Justice Ruth Bader Ginsburg wrote a concurring opinion, in which Justice Anthony Kennedy joined, expressing some concern about whether patentees would have sufficient notice that they must explain the reasons for their amendments. Nevertheless, they agreed with the remand to the lower court to establish the plaintiff's reason for setting a lower limit.

== See also ==
- List of United States Supreme Court cases, volume 520
- List of United States Supreme Court cases
- Lists of United States Supreme Court cases by volume
