= G 1/83, G 5/83 and G 6/83 =

1984 decisions by the European Patent Office

G 1/83, G 5/83 and G 6/83

Enlarged Board of Appeal of the European Patent Office

ECLI:EP:BA:1984:G000183.19841205
decisions issued on 5 December 1984
Board composition

Chairman: Romuald Singer
Members: O. Bossung, P. Ford, R. Kämpf, M. Prélot, G. Szabo, J. van Voorthuizen

Headwords

zweite medizinische Indikation/BAYER
second medical indication/EISAI
deuxième indication médicale/PHARMUKA

G 1/83, G 5/83 and G 6/83 (Note: The Enlarged Board of Appeal issued the same judgement in seven cases, i.e. G 1/83, G 2/83, G 3/83, G 4/83, G 5/83, G 6/83, and G 7/83, after examining "the point of law in each of the cases at the same time". Only decisions G 1/83, G 5/83 and G 6/83 have been published in the EPO Official Journal in German, English, and French respectively, the three official languages of the EPO.) are landmark decisions issued on 5 December 1984 by the Enlarged Board of Appeal of the European Patent Office (EPO) on the patentability of second or further medical use of a known substance or composition. They deal with patent claims directed to such second or subsequent medical use, and, as explained in reason 22 of decision G 5/83, the Enlarged Board held that patent claims directed to such substances or compositions were allowable under the European Patent Convention (EPC) when worded as purpose-limited product claims, which are also referred to as "Swiss-type use claims". These decisions are the first decisions issued by the Enlarged Board of Appeal.

== Background ==
The European Patent Convention (EPC) is a multilateral treaty instituting the legal system according to which European patents are granted. Its version applicable before December 13, 2007 contained a provision, namely Article 52(4) EPC 1973, (Note: Article 52(4) EPC 1973 has been moved to Article 53(c) EPC in the EPC 2000 which entered into force on December 13, 2007. The move did not alter the substance of the provision.) reading as follows:

Methods for treatment of the human or animal body by surgery or therapy and diagnostic methods practised on the human or animal body shall not be regarded as inventions which are susceptible of industrial application within the meaning of paragraph 1. This provision shall not apply to products, in particular substances or compositions, for use in any of these methods.

The EPC also contains provisions regarding novelty, with Article 54(1) EPC 1973 providing that "[a]n invention shall be considered to be new if it does not form part of the state of the art." Article 54(2) to (4) EPC 1973 also define what the state of the art comprises. Further, Article 54(5) EPC 1973 provided the following exception:

The provisions of paragraphs 1 to 4 shall not exclude the patentability of any substance or composition, comprised in the state of the art, for use in a method referred to in Article 52, paragraph 4, provided that its use for any method referred to in that paragraph is not comprised in the state of the art.

In other words, "Article 54(5) EPC [1973] exempts from the operation of the earlier paragraphs of that Article any substance or composition comprised in the state of the art for use in a method according to Article 52(4) EPC [1973]." Thus, besides the general concept of novelty, Article 54(5) EPC 1973 (now corresponding to Article 54(4) EPC) "introduces, in respect of substances and compounds used in surgical and therapeutic treatment and in diagnostic processes carried out on humans and animals, a special concept of novelty unknown in other technical fields (T 128/82, OJ 1984, 164)".

The question then arose as to whether use claims would have to be treated any differently from method claims when it comes to Article 52(4) EPC 1973, i.e. when it comes to a claimed method or claimed use "for treatment of the human or animal body by surgery or therapy and diagnostic methods practised on the human or animal body". Another question also arose as to "the possibility of protecting second (and subsequent) medical indications by means of a claim directed to the use of a substance or composition for the manufacture of a medicament for a specified (new) therapeutic application", as Article 54(5) EPC 1973 appears to literally deal only with first medical indications.

== Questions referred to the Enlarged Board of Appeal ==
The referrals to the Enlarged Board of Appeal lie from interlocutory decisions T 17/81, T 92/82, and T 24/82 from Technical Board of Appeal 3.3.1 (the sole Technical Board of Appeal for Chemistry at that time).

The question asked in decision T 17/81 and leading to decision G 1/83 is:

Kann für die Verwendung eines Stoffes oder Stoffgemisches zur therapeutischen Behandlung des menschlichen oder tierischen Körpers ein Patent mit auf die Verwendung gerichteten Patentansprüchen erteilt werden?

The question asked in decision T 92/82 and leading to decision G 5/83 is:

Can a patent with claims directed to the use be granted for the use of a substance or composition for the treatment of the human or animal body by therapy?

The question asked in decision T 24/82 and leading to decision G 6/83 is:

Un brevet comportant des revendications d'application peut-il être délivré lorsque celles-ci portent sur l'utilisation d'une substance ou d'une composition chimique à des fins thérapeutiques concernant l'homme ou l'animal?

In other words, "[t]he question of law referred to the Enlarged Board relate[d] to therapeutic use claims for substances and compositions in general". The Enlarged Board also considered that "the problem of the protection of inventions of the so-called "second medical indication"" was the central question in these cases, and therefore chose "to examine all aspects of that problem".

== Answers to the referred questions ==
The Enlarged Board of Appeal answered the question asked in decision T 17/81 as follows:

(1) Ein europäisches Patent kann nicht mit Patentansprüchen erteilt werden, die auf die Verwendung eines Stoffes oder Stoffgemisches zur therapeutischen Behandlung des menschlichen oder tierischen Körpers gerichtet sind.

(2) Ein europäisches Patent kann mit Patentansprüchen erteilt werden, die auf die Verwendung eines Stoffes oder Stoffgemisches zur Herstellung eines Arzneimittels für einebestimmte neue und erfinderische therapeutische Anwendung gerichtet sind.

The Enlarged Board of Appeal answered the question asked in decision T 92/82 as follows:

(1) A European patent with claims directed to the use may not be granted for the use of a substance or composition for the treatment of the human or animal body by therapy.

(2) A European patent may be granted with claims directed to the use of a substance or composition for the manufacture of a medicament for a specified new and inventive therapeutic application.

The Enlarged Board of Appeal answered the question asked in decision T 24/82 as follows:

(1) Un brevet européen ne peut pas être délivré sur la base de revendications ayant pour objet l'application d'une substance ou d'une composition en vue du traitement thérapeutique du corps humain ou animal.

(2) Un brevet européen peut être délivré sur la base de revendications ayant pour objet l'application d'une substance ou d'une composition pour obtenir un médicament destiné à une utilisation thérapeutique déterminée nouvelle et comportant un caractère inventif.

In summary, the Enlarged Board of Appeal held that use claims and method claims must be treated in the same manner if the purpose of the claimed use or method, respectively, is the "treatment of the human or animal body by surgery or therapy and diagnostic methods practised on the human or animal body". There is no difference in substance, these method claims and use claims are not patentable under Article 52(4) EPC 1973, and no patents can be granted for those. Further, the Enlarged Board also held that novelty of a substance or composition for the manufacture of a medicament for a specified new and inventive therapeutic application was to be acknowledged by virtue of "the new therapeutic use of the medicament" regardless of whether the new therapeutic use is the first pharmaceutical use of the medicament or a second (or further) pharmaceutical use of the medicament. The Enlarged Board's decisions were thus a response to a gap, i.e. a lacuna, in the law.

== Application of the Vienna Convention on the Law of Treaties ==
In its decision, the Enlarged Board also held that the Vienna Convention on the Law of Treaties was not in force at the time of conclusion of the European Patent Convention (EPC). Consequently, the Vienna Convention does not apply to the EPC by operation of law (ex lege). The Enlarged Board still held that due to a number of convincing precedents, the EPO should apply the rules of the Vienna Convention. More specifically, it held that Articles 31 and 32 of the Vienna Convention are each relevant to the interpretation of the EPC.

== Analysis ==
The type of claim referred to in the answers provided by the Enlarged Board of Appeal in G 1/83, G 5/83 and G 6/83 is called a "Swiss-type claim" or "Swiss-type use claim". The EPC 2000 removed the need for Swiss-type claims. According to decision G 2/08, a claim deriving its novelty from a new therapeutic use shall no longer come as a Swiss-type claim.
