= LizardTech, Inc. v. Earth Resource Mapping, Inc. =

Lizardtech, Inc. v. Earth Res. Mapping, Inc.
- Court: United States Court of Appeals for the Federal Circuit
- Full case name: Lizardtech, Inc. and Regents of the University of California v. Earth Resource Mapping, Inc. and Earth Resource Mapping Pty Ltd. (now Earth Resource Mapping Ltd.
- Decided: October 4 2005
- Citations: 424 F.3d 1336; 76 U.S.P.Q.2d 1724

Case history
- Prior history: Finding for Defendant, LizardTech, Inc. v. Earth Res. Mapping, Inc., No. C99-1602C, 2000 WL 34502412 (W.D. Wash. March 14, 2004); reversed and remanded, 35 F. App'x 918 (Fed. Cir. May 22, 2002).

Court membership
- Judges sitting: Alan David Lourie, Alvin Anthony Schall, William Curtis Bryson

Case opinions
- Majority: Bryson, joined by a unanimous panel

Laws applied
- 35 U.S.C. § 112

Lizardtech, Inc. v. Earth Res. Mapping, Inc., 424 F.3d 1336 (Fed. Cir. 2005), LizardTech sued Earth Resource Mapping (ERM) for patent infringement related to taking discrete wavelet transforms (DWTs) in their ER Mapper program. The court ruled in ERM's favor, finding that some of the claims were invalid, and that ER Mapper did not infringe the other claims. The case has been viewed as an example of the "written description doctrine" which courts may use when applying 35 U.S.C. § 112 to decide the validity of patent claims.

== Background ==
LizardTech held US patent number 5,710,835 (the '835 patent) which covers a method for computing the DWT of a digital image with a limited amount of memory. LizardTech sued ERM, alleging that they infringed several of the claims in the patent. The University of California, being the record owner of the patent, was subsequently added as a party on the motion.

== LizardTech's patent ==
In order to take the DWT of an image that is too large to fit in a computer's memory, prior art computer programs would first break the image into tiles, and calculate the DWT of each tile separately. Such a program only needs to fit one tile in memory at a time. However, when the filter is applied near the edge of a tile, the values which would normally have come from the neighboring tile are artificially set to zero. This introduces edge artifacts. The '835 patent solves this problem by computing DWT coefficients for pixels outside of the current tile, and then adding those values to the DWT coefficients computed for the adjoining tile. The resulting DWT is seamless.

== ERM's software ==
ERM produced a software product called ER Mapper. ER Mapper included a memory-efficient algorithm to compute a seamless DWT. This algorithm did not work in exactly the same way as the patent's description: it first calculated the DWT coefficients in the row direction for all the pixels in each row of the image, and then proceeded to take the DWT of the resulting coefficients in each column. This required only one row or column to be loaded into memory at once.

== Procedural history ==
On October 6, 1999, LizardTech filed suit against ERM in the Western District of Washington Court alleging infringement of claims 1, 13, 22–25, 27 and 28 of the '835 patent, among other charges. ERM filed a motion for summary judgement of non-infringement, arguing that a row of pixels is not a tile as defined by the patent. On December 12, 2000, the district court issued an order which granted ERM's motion, and determined the meaning of the word "tile". On appeal, the Federal Circuit court reversed the grant of summary judgement and remanded for further proceedings, instructing the district court to consider the notion of "tile" to include a single row of pixels.

On remand, the district court held that ERM did not infringe claims 1 or 13, based on a claim construction suggested by a special master. The district court also held that claim 21 was invalid for obviousness. Finally, the court held that claim 21 and its dependent claims (all the remaining claims) were invalid because they failed to satisfy the written description requirement of 35 U.S.C. § 112. LizardTech appealed each of the rulings.

== Opinion of the Federal Circuit court ==
The Federal Circuit court affirmed the district court's judgement that ERM did not infringe claims 1 or 13, and that claims 21–25, 27 and 28 were invalid for failing to satisfy the written description requirement. They did not consider the district court's ruling that claim 21 was invalid for obviousness, since they had already decided it was invalid.

== Claims 1 and 13 ==
Claims 1 and 13 contained a limitation related to "maintaining updated sums". The district court construed this limitation to mean "summing the DWT coefficients of one tile together with overlapping DWT coefficients from one or more adjacent tiles". Both parties agreed with this construction. The district court held that ER Mapper failed to meet the limitation, since it never added together overlapping DWT coefficients.

LizardTech argued that the district court's holding changed the definition of "overlapping", and therefore altered their original construction of the claim which LizardTech had agreed to. The district court disagreed, saying that within the context, overlapping "can only mean that the DWT coefficient ... obtained from the data in one tile, is added to the DWT coefficient at the same position, obtained from the data in an adjacent tile".

LizardTech then argued that in the district court's construction, if DWT coefficients were generated from adjacent tiles, then they necessarily "overlapped". The district court rejected the argument, saying that the ER Mapper program calculated DWT coefficients only within the current tile.

Finally, LizardTech argued that after ER Mapper calculated the DWT of the image rows, when it calculated the resulting coefficients in the columns, it was summing coefficients across tiles. In response, the circuit court cited Phillips v. AWH Corp.: "the ordinary and customary meaning of a claim term is the meaning that the term would have to a person of ordinary skill in the art". The court held that there was no evidence that such a person would consider taking a DWT to fall under the "maintaining updated sums" limitation.

== Claims 21 and later ==
As explained by the circuit court, "claim 21 of the '835 patent is identical to claim 1 except that it does not contain the 'maintaining updated sums' and 'periodically compressing said sums' limitations". The district court decided that the claim did not lead to a seamless DWT because the word "seamless" did not appear in it. The circuit court agreed with LizardTech that claim 21 was directed to creating a seamless DWT, but nevertheless decided that claim 21 was invalid. The circuit court held that claim 21, since it lacked the limitations of claim 1, would need "to cover all ways of performing DWT-based compression processes that lead to a seamless DWT". The circuit court looked to the "written description" requirement of 35 U.S.C. § 112, holding that the '835 patent did not properly describe any method other than "maintaining updated sums". Since the patent failed to give a proper written description for claim 21, the circuit court ruled that claim 21 was invalid. The remaining claims depended on claim 21.

== See also ==
- Extensis, successor company of LizardTech
