= Machine (patent) =

Category in United States patent law

In United States patent law, a machine is one of the four principal categories of things that may be patented. The other three are a process (also termed a method), an article of manufacture (also termed a manufacture), and a composition of matter. In United States patent law, that same terminology has been in use since the first patent act in 1790 (with the exception that processes were formerly termed "arts").

In In re Nuitjen, 500 F.3d 1346 (Fed. Cir. 2007), the United States Court of Appeals for the Federal Circuit said:

The Supreme Court has defined the term "machine" as "a concrete thing, consisting of parts, or of certain devices and combination of devices." Burr v. Duryee, 68 U.S. (1 Wall.) 531, 570 (1863). This "includes every mechanical device or combination of mechanical powers and devices to perform some function and produce a certain effect or result."

— Corning v. Burden, 56 U.S. 252, 267 (1854).

To this it might be added that the parts must interact (usually dynamically) with one another, for otherwise they might be parts of an article of manufacture. It has been considered grounds for rejecting or invalidating a machine claim as being directed to a "mere aggregation" if the parts were merely associated with one another without interacting functionally. An illustration of a mere aggregation would be the "combination" of a bathtub and a pencil sharpener. More recently, the "mere aggregation" ground of invalidity for a machine claim has been subsumed under obviousness.

Examples of machines are steam engines, sewing machines, and TV sets. Electronic circuits have usually been considered machines, although they may lack moving parts.

== See also ==
- Machine-or-transformation test—test of patent-eligibility requiring transformation of article or implementation with "particular machine"
- Printed matter (patent law)
