= Method (patent) =

Category of allowable patent claim

In United States patent law, a method, also called "process", is one of the four principal categories of things that may be patented through "utility patents". The other three are a machine, an article of manufacture (also termed a manufacture), and a composition of matter.

In that context, a method is a series of steps for performing a function or accomplishing a result. While the terms method and process are largely interchangeable, method usually refers to a way to use a product to accomplish a given result, and process usually refers to a series of steps in manufacture. Thus, one might speak about a method for curing headaches that comprises the administration of a therapeutically effective dose of aspirin, or speak about a process for making soap or candles.

Not all methods, in the dictionary sense, are methods for purposes of United States patent law. The case law "forecloses a purely literal reading of § 101." The concept is elaborated in the article: machine-or-transformation test.

A method patent claim can be infringed only when a single person or entity (including contractually obligated agents) practices all of the claimed steps. Neither a physical device, such as a product that can be used to practice the method, nor instructions for practicing the method, are infringing until they are used by a single person to perform all the steps together. A potential exception to this rule for indirect infringement was implicit in the circuit court of appeal's ruling in Akamai Tech. v. Limelight Networks (Fed. Cir. 2012). The U.S. Supreme Court reversed the circuit court's ruling on Monday, June 2, 2014 (docket number 12-786), holding that the circuit court had misread patent law to reach its decision. The court noted that the statute explicitly defines a method patent to cover only the entirety of the method, and doesn't confer any rights in the individual steps that make up the method.

The European Patent Convention does not mention method patents (called process patents) so prominently, and the same applies to the TRIPS Agreement. The prime characteristic of process patents in these treaties is that "the protection conferred by the patent shall extend to the products directly obtained by such process". Art. 28(1)(b) TRIPS provides a similar rule. This shows the historical background of process patents in chemistry, where there was a need to protect new processes to manufacture known substances.

== See also ==
- Product-by-process
