= Machine-or-transformation test =

Concept in patent law

In United States patent law, the machine-or-transformation test is a test of patent eligibility under which a claim to a process qualifies for consideration if (1) the process is implemented by a particular machine in a non-conventional and non-trivial manner or (2) the process transforms an article from one state to another.

The origin of the test can be traced to the 1972 government's reply brief on the merits in the US Supreme Court case Gottschalk v. Benson:

we submit that the cases follow such a rule [machine or transformation]—implicitly or explicitly—and that they cannot be rationalized otherwise.

The test was also mentioned in the 1970s patent-eligibility trilogy—Gottschalk v. Benson, Parker v. Flook, and Diamond v. Diehr.

The "machine-or-transformation test" was finally endorsed in 2008 by Federal Circuit in Bilski, while explicitly overruling its earlier “useful, tangible and concrete result” test adopted in 1998 in State Street Bank & Trust Co. v. Signature Financial Group, Inc. Numerous legal commentators praised the "machine-or-transformation" test for its simplicity, objectivity, reliability, and independence of the result from time and prior art availability. Judge Pauline Newman wrote a strong dissent arguing for a broader definition of patentable processes.

On appeal, in its 2010 decision in Bilski v. Kappos the US Supreme Court refused to endorse the "machine-or-transformation" test as the sole criterion for patentable subject matter, stating instead, that machine-or-transformation test "while useful, is not an exclusive test for determining the patentability of a process". Following Pauline Newman's dissent, the SCOTUS opined, that future cases might present fact patterns calling for a different rule from that applicable to past cases, and therefore the machine-or-transformation test was just a "clue" (i.e. it is neither a necessary nor sufficient test- see below) for patent-eligible subject matter.

In the wake of the 2010 Supreme Court's opinion in Bilski v. Kappos, rejecting machine-or-transformation as the sole test of patent eligibility, and confirming that it is only a "useful clue," it is now clear, that this test is only a way to measure whether the patent claim in issue preempts substantially all applications of the underlying idea or principle on which a patent is based—such preemption being a far more basic and general test of patent eligibility or ineligibility.

== Supreme Court has held that this is not the only test ==
The Supreme Court has held that the machine-or-transformation test is not the sole test for the patent-eligibility of processes. The certiorari petition in Bilski challenged that proposition. and the Supreme Court's Bilski opinion expressly rejected the Federal Circuit's declaration that it was the exclusive test to apply; despite a dissent on the proper rationale, the court was unanimous on this point.

In Gottschalk v. Benson, the court expressly reserved the point and declined to adopt the test as exclusive, stating:

It is argued that a process patent must either be tied to a particular machine or apparatus or must operate to change articles or materials to a "different state or thing." We do not hold that no process patent could ever qualify if it did not meet the requirements of our prior precedents.

The government had made an argument in its brief in Benson that the Court should so hold and that it was impossible to rationalize the case law any other way. The Court, in its ruling, refused or failed to agree with that argument.

== Outstanding issues ==
The Benson and Bilski opinions left important details of the machine-or-transformation test unexplained. The details include what kind of transformation is sufficient to confer patent-eligibility and what are the characteristics of a "particular machine" that confers patent-eligibility.

=== Transformation ===
Transformation of an article from one thing or state to another is said to be a clue to patent eligibility. Thus, in Benson, the court stated that "Transformation and reduction of an article `to a different state or thing' is the clue to the patentability of a process claim...." A hundred years earlier, the Court had said, "A process is ... an act, or a series of acts, performed upon the subject matter to be transformed and reduced to a different state or thing."

==== What is an article? ====
The Benson opinion indicated that the article had to be a physical object, such as a lump of rubber (to be transformed from raw to cured state), a piece of leather (to be transformed from untanned skin to tanned leather), or a pile of flour (to be transformed from coarse to superfine particles). The Federal Circuit's In re Schrader opinion, however, indicated that the article could be an electronic signal representative of a physical parameter, such as an EKG ("electrocardiograph signals representative of human cardiac activity ") or seismogram ("seismic reflection signals representative of discontinuities below the earth's surface") signal. Thus, the Schrader opinion chided the Supreme Court for speaking of physical "articles" rather than "subject matter," and thus only "imperfectly" reflecting the relevant legal principle. The Bilski court appears to adhere to the Schrader formulation, rather than that of Benson, so that it seems to consider a signal transformation patent-eligible when the signal is representative of certain types of physical actions. But a transformation of signals representative of monetary or legal relations does not qualify, given the affirmance of the PTO's rejection of Bilski's claim and perhaps the Bilski court's treatment of State Street Bank, as well.

==== How much of a transformation is needed? ====
Judge Rader asked in his Bilski dissent, "What form or amount of 'transformation' suffices?" The court did not answer his question. It may be that a "substantial" physical or chemical change of properties that is material to the objectives of the invention is required, but this is still to be resolved.

=== A "particular machine" ===
Benson and Bilski speak about the process being tied to "a particular machine" while Flook says that the mechanical implementation of a natural principle must be "inventive":

Even though a phenomenon of nature or mathematical formula may be well known, an inventive application of the principle may be patented. Conversely, the discovery of such a phenomenon cannot support a patent unless there is some other inventive concept in its application.

In Flook the implementation was conceded to be conventional and no departure from the prior art. Therefore, the principle with or plus a conventional implementation was patent-ineligible. The Flook Court also cited and relied on the same principle as being illustrated in Funk Brothers Seed Co. v. Kalo Inoculant Co., in which the natural principle was implemented in a manner so trivial on its face that the patent on the implementing article of manufacture was tantamount to a patent on the natural principle.

This aspect of the machine-or-transformation test remains to some extent an uncertain and controversial issue. For a time it was asserted that it remains "unclear whether tying a process to a general purpose computer is sufficient to pass the machine-or-transformation test." But in 2014 the Supreme Court expressly held in the Alice case that simply adding to a claim "do it with a computer" could not make for patent eligibility. The Alice case and its progeny also cast doubt on the assertion that use of the "programmed computer claim format" overcomes the patent-eligibility problem. The Federal Circuit's Bilski opinion explicitly left the question unresolved. In the opening words of the Benson opinion, however, this statement occurs:

Respondents filed in the patent office an application for an invention that was described as being related "to the processing of data by program and more particularly to the programmed conversion of numerical information" in general purpose digital computers. . . . The claims were not limited to any particular art or technology, to any particular apparatus or machinery, or to any particular end use. They purported to cover any use of the claimed method in a general purpose digital computer of any type.

Arguably, this language disposes of the issue. Some pre- and post-Bilski decisions of the PTO appellate board (BPAI) take the position that a programmed general-purpose digital computer is not a "particular machine," and that corresponding Beauregard claims to an encoded medium are equally nonstatutory.

In CyberSource Corp. v. Retail Decisions, Inc., a California federal district court held that limitation of a process to implementation "over the Internet" does not satisfy the machine-or-transformation test. First, the Internet is not a "particular machine." The Internet is an intangible abstraction. Second, the limitation to a particular technological environment is a mere field-of-use limitation, which does not suffice under sec. 101. Third, the use of the Internet does not impose meaningful limits on the preemptive scope of the claims. The same court held that a "Beauregard" claim directed to the instructions for performing a method that does not pass the machine-or-transformation test will also fail to pass that test. The court pointed out that the PTO appellate board had similarly interpreted Bilski. The subsequent Alice decision appears to have substantially resolved these questions in favor of a determination of patent ineligibility.

An imperfectly resolved issue is whether the machine-or-transformation test is narrowly misnamed, since the relevant case law includes comparable implementations of natural-principle processes with other types of physical objects besides a machine. In Funk, on which Flook relied, the implementation of the natural principle was with a package — an article of manufacture. There is no principled reason why a natural-principle process must be implemented physically with a machine and not with an article of manufacture or composition of matter. The test explained in Bilski thus should be regarded as a physical object or transformation test or a device-or-transformation test.

=== Is satisfying the test a necessary condition for patent-eligibility, a sufficient condition, both or neither? ===
It is debatable whether the decision of the Federal Circuit in In re Bilski made the machine-or-transformation test a necessary condition for patent-eligibility, a sufficient condition, or both a necessary and sufficient condition. The Bilski opinion seems to declare a rule that a claimed invention is patent-eligible if and only if it satisfies the machine-or-transformation test. Both prongs of if-and-only-if have been challenged, and in its opinion on appellate review of the Federal Circuit's opinion the Supreme Court held that the machine-or-transformation test was only a helpful clue and not in itself dispositive.

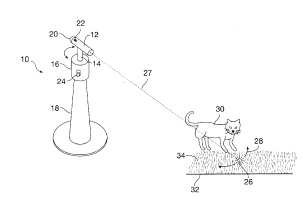
Method and apparatus for exercising a cat

A commentator asserted that an example illustrating the proposition that satisfying the machine-or-transformation test is not a sufficient condition for patent-eligibility occurs in U.S. Pat. No. 6,701,872. This patent covers a method and apparatus (machine) for entertaining a cat by using a moving laser beam (relatively high technology). The method is implemented with a "particular machine"—"a rotating laser source mounted directly on a shaft driven directly by a motor mounted on a portable pedestal" (method claim 14). But it is debatable whether entertaining a cat may be considered a useful Art, and some may argue that this "discovery" is not the kind of discovery that the Patent Clause contemplates.

Attempts have been made, also, to describe processes that fail to satisfy the machine-or-transformation test but nonetheless seem clearly to be patent-eligible.

A method of removing dirt from a soiled garment, comprising:

placing a soiled garment in flowing water; and

shaking said garment for at least five minutes.

The question has been raised, also, whether beating the garment with a stick constitutes use of a "particular machine." That question is illustrated by the following hypothetical claim that is a variation on the preceding example:

A method of removing dirt from a soiled garment, comprising:

submerging a soiled garment in water; and

beating said garment for at least five minutes with a stick.

The point of this type of analysis is that the machine-or-transformation test does not work for all cases. There are some unusual outliers that satisfy the test but are patent-ineligible and some that do not satisfy the test but are patent-eligible. The Supreme Court's subsequent analyses in the Bilski and Alice cases confirms the inability of the machine-or-transformation test to cover all possible cases, as the foregoing examples suggest. Therefore, these "thought experiment" patent claims show that, while the machine-or-transformation test is a valuable and useful clue, as the Alice case states, and it may well cover most practical cases, it is neither a necessary nor sufficient test of patent eligibility.

=== The "corollaries" ===
Bilski points out, and the PTO recently emphasized in a memorandum to its Examining Staff, that there are two "corollaries" to the machine-or-transformation test. First, a mere field-of-use limitation is generally insufficient to make an otherwise ineligible method claim patent-eligible. The PTO Guidance Memo explains that "[t]his means the machine or transformation must impose meaningful limits on the method claim's scope [for it] to pass the test." What makes a limitation meaningful is unstated, but perhaps that concept can be defined in terms of whether the limitation places only an insubstantial limitation on claim scope or preemptiveness.

The second corollary is that insignificant extra-solution activity will not transform a patent ineligible principle into a patentable process. The PTO Guidance Memo explains that "[t]his means reciting a specific machine or a particular transformation of a specific article in an insignificant step, such as data gathering or outputting, is not sufficient to pass the test." It is unclear whether this concept would apply to such acts as gathering temperature data from thermocouples inside a mold or opening the lid of a mold upon the completion of a curing process.

It is reasonable to assume that whether a given step is insignificant or central to a claimed process will be a controversial issue in post-Bilski cases testing the meaning of the machine-or-transformation test.

=== Possible interaction between the machine-or-transformation test and the exhausted combination doctrine ===
It has not yet been explored in litigation whether claiming a computer-related advance as an exhausted combination provides a way to prevent the claimed advance from being classified as nonstatutory subject matter. A so-called exhausted combination claim is one to a device in which a novel group of elements cooperates in a conventional manner with some old elements—for example, a new kind of motor and an old disk drive. Placing a process that fails the machine-or-transformation test in a machine environment overcomes the absence of implementation by a specific machine, as required by In re Bilski and the Supreme Court decisions on which it is based.

The format of the processes claimed in Diamond v. Diehr, Parker v. Flook, and Gottschalk v. Benson illustrate the concept and its practical application. In Diehr, the claim was to "a method of operating a rubber-molding press" using the Arrhenius equation, and the claim contained at least minimal references to the mold press and other apparatus. The Court held the claim patent-eligible. In Flook, the claim was to a "method for updating the value of at least one alarm limit," where an "'alarm limit' was a number." The claim said nothing about a chemical reaction vessel or even temperature measuring devices. The Court held the claim patent-ineligible. In Benson, the claim was to "a data processing method for converting binary coded decimal number representations into binary number representations." One claim mentioned a reentrant shift register and the other claim mentioned no apparatus at all. The Court held both claims patent-ineligible, however, on the ground that the computer-equipment limitation was too trivial to avoid preempting the idea, since the method could not feasibly be used except with a computer.

In Flook, the claim could have instead been to "a method of operating a hydrocracking plant wherein hydrocarbon feedstock is fed into a chemical reactor, heat is applied, etc." The claim, although to an exhausted combination, would have required apparatus as did that in the Diehr case. Similarly, the claim in Benson could have been to a method of operating a telephone switch box or perhaps even a method of providing binary-coded-decimal numerical signals to a binary-coded operating device. Again, by providing a seemingly nontrivial mechanical environment, even though it was just an exhausted combination, the claims drafter might have avoided the holding of nonstatutory subject matter (patent-ineligibility). It is thus possible that careful claims drafting techniques will succeed in elevating form over substance, to avoid the impact of the machine-or-transformation test.

The subsequent unanimous Supreme Court decisions in the Mayo and Alice cases, by reaffirming the doctrine of the Flook case, cast doubt on the likelihood of success of the drafting techniques described above. That doctrine is that a claim to the implementation of a principle that is patent ineligible in itself must be inventive rather than routine and conventional, in order to make that claim patent eligible.
