= CyberSource Corp. v. Retail Decisions, Inc. =

United States Court of Appeals for the Federal Circuit case

- Court: United States Court of Appeals for the Federal Circuit
- Full case name: CyberSource Corp. v. Retail Decisions, Inc.
- Decided: August 16, 2011
- Citations: 654 F.3d 1366; 99 U.S.P.Q.2d 1690

Case history
- Prior history: 620 F. Supp. 2d 1068 (N.D. Cal. 2009)

Court membership
- Judges sitting: William Curtis Bryson, Timothy B. Dyk, Sharon Prost

Case opinions
- Majority: Dyk, joined by a unanimous panel

Laws applied
- 35 U.S.C. § 101

Keywords
- patent eligibility, machine-or-transformation test, Beauregard claim, credit card transaction

CyberSource Corp. v. Retail Decisions, Inc., 654 F.3d 1366 (Fed. Cir. 2011), is a United States Court of Appeals for the Federal Circuit case that disputed patent eligibility for the '154 patent, which describes a method and system for detecting fraud of credit card transactions through the internet. This court affirmed the decision of United States District Court for the Northern District of California which ruled that the patent is actually unpatentable.

== Background ==
CyberSource Corporation is the owner of '154 patent (U.S. Patent No. 6,029,154), which describes a method and system for detecting fraud of credit card transactions through internet by using IP addresses, MAC addresses, e-mail addresses, etc. in order to determine if an address is associated with the credit card. Essentially, the patent is divided into a method and a system part. The method aspect is described in Claim 3, and the system part is described in Claim 2. The details are as follows:

=== Method claim (Claim 3) ===
Claim 3 is the method for verifying the validity of a credit card transaction over the Internet by obtaining information about other transactions over the web with similar card transaction information, constructing a map of the card numbers and using it to determine whether or not the credit card transaction is valid or not.

=== System claim (Claim 2) ===
Claim 2 generally mentions a computer readable medium containing program instructions, but mostly contains nearly identically the exact process described in Claim 3.

The disputing point was whether Claim 3 and Claim 2 are patent-eligible. The district court affirmed that both Claim 3 and Claim 2 are unpatentable based on the fact that these claims were not sufficient under 35 U.S.C. § 101, citing the In re Bilski case, which disputed a method of hedging risk in the field of commodities trading. Moreover, the court noted that both claims were directed as an unpatentable "mental process". The decision was made with reference to Bilski's case, as the Bilski case was appealed to the Supreme Court while this case was proceeding. History of these cases are documented in the timeline below.

=== Timeline of events ===
1. CyberSource sued Retail Decisions Inc. for patent infringement on August 11, 2004.
2. Retail Decisions initiated an ex parte reexamination of the '154 patent to the U.S. Patent and Trademark Office.
3. District court suspended proceedings until the patent is reissued.
4. Patent certificate reissued with amended claims on August 5, 2008.
5. District court restarted the proceeding.
6. Federal Circuit decided In re Bilski on October 30, 2008.
7. District court dismissed the claims of CyberSource.
8. CyberSource appealed to Federal circuit court in April 2009.
9. The court suspended proceedings until the decision of Bilski.
10. Supreme Court of the United States made the decision of Bilski v. Kappos on June 28, 2010.
11. The proceeding started again on October 28, 2010.

== Opinion of the Court ==
The federal circuit court affirmed the district court decision, that both Claim 3 and Claim 2 are not patent-eligible, because they attempted to capture "unpatentable mental processes". Moreover, they were invalid under 35 U.S.C section 101. This court also referenced unpatentability from In re Bilski. Further, the court mentioned that the "machine-or-transformation test", which is one of the determining patent-eligibility tests, can not be the only test for judging the patent eligibility citing Bilski v. Kappos. The court also took into consideration three specific exceptions under 35 U.S.C section 101, which are "laws of nature", "physical phenomena", and "abstract ideas".

=== Method Claim ===
First, the court argued that the Claim 3 did not pass the machine-or-transformation test because the internet cannot perform the fraud detection steps by itself. Further, the court mentioned that the mere collection and organization of data regarding credit card numbers and Internet addresses is insufficient to meet the transformation prong of the test. Moreover, the internet is not an exclusive source of the data needed for the analysis, and the court found the process is not tied to any particular machine, regardless of whether or not the internet can be considered as a machine.

Second, the court examined the claim outside the scope of the machine-or-transformation test like in the Bilski v. Kappos case. Interpreting the Supreme Court's decision and rationale, the court likened the claim to something which can be performed mentally by a human, demonstrating that it is not patent-eligible. Because no algorithms of any kind and each of the steps in Claim 3 are conceivably doable in the human mind, they are represented by "basic tools of scientific and technological work".

=== System claim ===
The court categorized Claim 2 as a Beauregard claim, a claim involving a computer readable medium containing instructions for a computer to perform the process. The court noted that Claim 2 contains language nearly identical to that in Claim 3 will only a few additions. As such, Claim 2 was also found unpatentable because it is related to a mental process. While CyberSource claims that the claim is indeed patentable because it is coupled with a manufacture or machine unlike in Claim 3, the court ignores the claim's structural category based on its general language. Citing court decisions in Gottschalk v. Benson, the court determined that mental processes are not patentable, even if they are performed by computers.

== Impact of Bilski case ==
This case is one of the judicially refining software patent eligibility cases after the Bilski decision. After deciding the Bilski case, the Federal Circuit court has not created a new test or expanded the machine-or-transformation test. This case has shed light on patent-eligibility specifically related to the broad treatment of the internet as a machine.

== See also ==
- Gottschalk v. Benson
- patent eligibility
- machine-or-transformation test
- Beauregard claim
