= Abbott v. Sandoz =

- Court: United States Court of Appeals for the Federal Circuit
- Full case name: Abbott Laboratories v. Sandoz, Inc., et al.
- Decided: May 18, 2009
- Citations: 566 F.3d 1282; 90 U.S.P.Q.2d 1769

Case history
- Prior history: Lupin Ltd. v. Abbott Laboratories, 484 F. Supp. 2d 448 (E.D. Va. 2007); partial summary judgment granted, 491 F. Supp. 2d 563 (E.D. Va. 2007); Abbott Labs. v. Sandoz, Inc., 486 F. Supp. 2d 767 (N.D. Ill. 2007)
- Subsequent history: Cert. denied, 558 U.S. 1136 (2010)

Court membership
- Judges sitting: Randall Ray Rader, S. Jay Plager, William Curtis Bryson, Paul Redmond Michel, Arthur J. Gajarsa, Richard Linn, Timothy B. Dyk, Sharon Prost, Kimberly Ann Moore, Pauline Newman, Haldane Robert Mayer, Alan David Lourie (en banc)

Case opinions
- Majority: Rader, joined by Michel, Bryson, Gajarsa, Linn, Dyk, Prost, Moore
- Concur/dissent: Newman, joined by Mayer, Lourie
- Dissent: Lourie

Abbott v. Sandoz, 566 F.3d 1282 (Fed. Cir. 2009), was a US patent law case argued before the United States Court of Appeals for the Federal Circuit that established a bright-line ruling regarding claims of patent infringement relating to disagreements over so-called “product-by-process” claims. The case was decided on May 18, 2009.

== Background ==
Abbott Labs had a patent on a specific drug called Omnicef used to combat ear infections. Lupin Limited had a court rule that a generic form of Omnicef it produced did not infringe on Abbott's patent since their process to make the drug was different. After the court had ruled in Lupin's favor, Abbott appealed and the case was combined with several other legal suits against smaller pharmaceutical companies, and thus was renamed Abbott v. Sandoz. The federal court affirmed the lower court's decision.

== Case ==
For several years, the courts have disagreed on the product-by-process definition. Product-by-process refers to the question of determining if a product is legally different from another if it is created by a different process. Federal courts have offered contradictory resolutions on the subject. The court determined that a patent may limit itself if it specifically defines the process of creation.

== Decision ==
Despite the legal discrepancies, the U.S. Court of Appeals for the Federal Circuit (CAFC) held that using a different process in this case did not infringe on Abbott's patent and ruled in Sandoz's favor, along with ruling in favor of the other small pharmaceuticals companies. Since Abbott had not patented all processes to create its drug, it could not protect from the processes being used by others.

== Importance ==
This case further enforces the product-by-process definition, and holds that a patent does not protect from infringement through a different process unless necessarily described. Patent-holders seeking to cover their products entirely must find ways to protect every process to create the same item if they want complete protection from infringement.
