= Extensis =

Celartem, Inc.
- Trade name: Extensis
- Industry: Computer software
- Founded: Portland, Oregon, United States
- Products: Extensis Connect; Extensis Connect + Insight
- Website: www.extensis.com

Celartem, Inc., doing business as Extensis, is a software company based in Portland, Oregon.

== History ==
Extensis and its parent company CreativePro.com were sold to ImageX in year 2000, which in turn sold Extensis to Japanese content-management company Celartem Technology in 2002. In 2003, Extensis acquired competitor DiamondSoft and their Font Reserve applications (stand-alone and client-server). In January 2006, Extensis merged its two font management products, Font Reserve and Suitcase into a single product called Suitcase Fusion. In August 2010, Extensis launched WebINK, a web font subscription service. This service was discontinued on July 1, 2015.

In 2018, Extensis united with its sister company, LizardTech, to continue developing and distributing software for compressing and distributing massive, high-resolution geospatial data.

== See also ==
- List of companies based in Oregon
- LizardTech, Inc. v. Earth Resource Mapping, Inc.
