= Claim chart =

Analytical tool related to patent infringement litigation

A claim chart is a widely used device in patent infringement litigation. It is a convenient and effective means for analyzing and presenting information regarding a patent claim. In each, typically, there are two columns: the left column contains the language of the patent claim under analysis, separated into the successive limitations (e.g., elements or steps, integers, parts) of the claim; the right column contains the information relating to the claim element at its left.

== Types ==
There are three principal types of claim chart:

- A chart of references (such earlier patents and magazine articles) that allegedly show the invalidity of the patent because of anticipation or obviousness. (This would be a chart prepared by the defendant or party accused of infringing the patent.)
- An infringement chart that allegedly shows how the product or process accused of infringement contains each claim element, thereby satisfying the all elements test for infringement. (This would be a chart prepared by the plaintiff or patent owner.)
- Less commonly, a claim interpretation chart that shows, for each claim element, passages in the patent specification or in technical literature that show the proper meaning or interpretation that should be given to the language of the claim. (Either party might prepare this chart.)

Other claim chart types include initial or preliminary infringement contentions (PICs); domestic industry (DI) charts employed in International Trade Commission (ITC) importation actions; expert claim charts; "parts list" charts used for example as demonstrative exhibits; claim charts presented during licensing or settlement negotiations; and design patent charts.

== Illustrative example ==
The following illustrative chart of references to show the invalidity of a hypothetical patent is based on a chart that was prepared by the US Patent and Trademark Office (PTO) and is found in its Manual of Patent Examining Procedure (MPEP), § 2214:

U.S. Patent No. 9,999,999	Smith [Patent]
Claim 1. A filter comprising a housing,	Smith teaches "the filter housing
the housing having an outer wall,	having an outer wall 1,
a closed end,	a closed end 2,
an open end, and	an open end 3,
a lid	and a hinged lid 4
attachable to the open end...	that is securable to the open end 3 via clamp 5." (col. 6, lines 2–3; Figure 3). The hinged lid 4 of Smith is attachable to the outer rim of the open end 3 via clamp 5.
wherein the housing contains a filter material,	"the filter housing containing filter materials"
the filter material comprising activated carbon....	Smith teaches activated carbon as a filter material: "wherein the filter materials include any mixture of known filter materials such as clay, activated carbon, and any other known filter materials." (col. 12, lines 1–3).

== Patentable subject matter chart ==
Claim charts may also be used to support an argument that a patent claims ineligible subject matter, such as a law of nature or a conventional business practice. The left column of this type of chart is the same as that of the claim charts described above. In the right column, the steps or elements of a well known business concept or a way of organizing human activity are listed. The purpose is to show that the claimed process or system is well known with the addition only of "do it with a computer" (or something similar). Under the Supreme Court's decision in Alice v. CLS Bank such a patent claim is usually invalidated as a mere abstract idea (unless implemented in an inventive manner).

An example of such a table appears in the defendant's briefs in Walker Digital, LLC v. Google, Inc. The court said that the chart showed: "As the following hypothetical [case] (articulated by Google, and not meaningfully distinguished by Walker) shows, these steps can and routinely are performed by, for example, human job headhunters." This is the chart from the Walker Digital case:

Limitations of ’270 Patent Claim 1	Routine Steps Performed when Headhunting
receiving from a first party first data including an identity of said first party	Carol receives a resume from Alice, which lists Alice's college degree, 8 years of sales experience, interests, and other information, including Alice's name
receiving from said first party at least two first-party rules for releasing said first data including a rule for releasing the identity of said first party	Alice instructs Carol to disclose her education and sales experience to companies with open sales positions but not to disclose her name unless the company is offering a salary of at least $75,000
receiving from a second party a search request comprising at least one search criterion	Bob asks Carol to find an employee with sales experience for his company
receiving from said second party second data including an identity of said second party	Bob tells Carol that the job at his company is a sales position that pays $100,000 in salary and that the name of his company is Bob's Software
receiving from said second party at least two second-party rules for releasing said second party data including a rule for releasing said identity of said second party	Bob instructs Carol that she can disclose information about the job opening to any applicant with sales experience and that she can provide the salary offer to any applicant with a college degree but not to disclose the name of his company unless the applicant has more than 5 years of sales experience
processing said search request to determine if said first data satisfies said search criterion	Carol checks to see if Alice has the necessary sales experience requested by Bob
if said first data satisfies said search criterion, then exchanging said first and second data, except said identities of said first and second parties, between said first and second parties in accordance with said first-party and second-party rules	Once Carol determines that Alice has the necessary sales experience for Bob, Carol provides Alice's college degree and years of sales experience to Bob, but not Alice's name, and provides information to Alice about the sales position available at Bob's company and the salary information, but not the name of Bob's company, in accordance with Alice's instructions and Bob's instructions
after said exchanging step, upon satisfying said first-party rule for releasing said identity of said first party, transmitting said identity of said first party to said second party, and after said exchanging step, upon satisfying said second-party rule for releasing said identity of said second party, transmitting said identity of said second party to said first party	After Carol provides Alice's sales experience and college degree to Bob and provides Bob's salary offer and sales position available at Bob's company to Alice, Carol gives Alice's name to Bob upon determining that Bob's company is offering at least $75,000 in salary and tells Alice the name of Bob's company upon determining that Alice has more than 5 years of sales experience

As a result of its review of the chart, the Walker Digital court concluded:

Even after carefully reviewing the parties’ briefs and the patents, and questioning the parties about Google’s hypothetical at the hearing, the Court is unable to discern any reason why, in Google’s hypothetical, Carol would not be liable for infringement of Walker’s ’270 patent. Based on the undisputed evidence, and drawing all reasonable inferences in Walker’s favor, the Court concludes that every step of claim 1 of the ’270 patent is performed in Google’s routine headhunting hypothetical. It follows that all the steps of the ’270 patent are routine and []conventional. To allow the claim to survive would disproportionately risk preempting a building block of human interaction, retarding rather than promoting progress, contrary to the very purpose patents are granted.

The court thereafter held the patent invalid.
