= Romuald Singer =

Legal academic

Romuald Singer (8 November 1920 – 20 August 1991) was director of the international section of the Centre for International Intellectual Property Studies (CEIPI), Strasbourg, and chairman of the Enlarged and the Legal Board of Appeal of the European Patent Office (EPO). He also authored the first edition of a well-known commentary on the European Patent Convention.

As first chairman of the Enlarged Board of Appeal of the EPO, he chaired the first group of cases decided by that Board, i.e. G 1/83, G 5/83 and G 6/83. This was the only one and the last decision by the Enlarged Board of Appeal under the chairmanship of Singer before he retired.
