= Composition of matter =

Category in US patent law

In United States patent law, a composition of matter is one of the four principal categories of things that may be patented. The other three are a process (also termed a method), a machine, and an article of manufacture. In United States patent law, that same terminology has been in use since the first patent act in 1790 (with the exception that processes were formerly termed "arts").

The United States Supreme Court has defined "composition of matter" to mean "all compositions of two or more substances and all composite articles, whether they be the results of chemical union, or of mechanical mixture, or whether they be gases, fluids, powders or solids." That definition is problematic, however, because composite articles can be articles of manufacture—as in the case of a piece of plywood, a concrete sidewalk, a road, a fibreglass bathtub, a (kitchen) countertop, or a flitch beam.

Robinson on Patents has defined "composition of matter" in these terms:

A composition of matter is an instrument formed by the intermixture of two or more ingredients, and possessing properties which belong to none of these ingredients in their separate state. ...The intermixture of ingredients in a composition of matter may be produced by mechanical or chemical operations, and its result may be a compound substance resolvable into its constituent elements by mechanical processes, or a new substance which can be destroyed only by chemical analysis.

A newly synthesized chemical compound or molecule may be patented as a composition of matter. Patents have been allowed on transitory products, such as short-lived chemical intermediates.

== Living things as compositions of matter ==
In Diamond v. Chakrabarty, the United States Supreme Court held that a genetically-altered living microorganism was patent-eligible subject matter. The Chakrabarty Court said that "we must determine whether respondent's micro-organism constitutes a 'manufacture' or 'composition of matter' within the meaning of the statute. The Court's answer to its question was yes----"respondent's micro-organism plainly qualifies as patentable subject matter." But the Court never said which one it was.

=== The oncomouse ===
In 1988, the United States Patent and Trademark Office (USPTO) granted U.S. patent 4,736,866 (filed Jun 22, 1984, issued Apr 12, 1988, expired April 12, 2005) to Harvard College claiming a mouse (the "oncomouse") as “a transgenic non-human mammal whose germ cells and somatic cells contain a re-combinant activated oncogene sequence introduced into said mammal…”

The European Patent Office (EPO) concluded that the usefulness of the oncomouse in furthering cancer research satisfied the likelihood of substantial medical benefit, and outweighed moral concerns about suffering caused to the animal. In the original application, the claims referred to animals in general, but in the course of the proceedings, the patent was amended and finally maintained with claims limited to mice.

The oncomouse has been patented in Australia, Belgium, Denmark, Finland, France, Germany, Greece, Ireland, Italy, Japan, Luxembourg, The Netherlands, New Zealand, Portugal, Spain, Sweden, and the United Kingdom.

After extended litigation, in 2000, a Canadian court permitted issuance of a patent on a mouse as a "composition of matter." However, in 2002, the Canadian Supreme Court reversed that ruling and held (5-4) that the mouse itself could not be patented, but the biochemical process used to modify it could be.

== See also ==
- Printed matter (patent law)
