= G 2/08 =

G 2/08

Enlarged Board of Appeal of the European Patent Office

ECLI:EP:BA:2010:G000208.20100219
Decision issued on 19 February 2010
Board composition

Chairman: Peter Messerli
Members: P. Alting van Geusau, J.-P. Seitz, B. Günzel, U. Kinkeldey, S. Nathanael, B. Schachenmann

Headwords

Dosage regime/ABBOTT RESPIRATORY

G 2/08 is a decision issued by the Enlarged Board of Appeal of the European Patent Office (EPO) on 19 February 2010. The decision deals with the patentability of medications. More specifically, the decision deals with claims directed to second medical use. Second medical use claims pertain to medications to be used for particular conditions or diseases. In the case at issue, the second medical use pertains to a new dosage regime of a known substance.

== The questions ==
The three questions referred to the Enlarged Board of Appeal were:

(1) Where it is already known to use a particular medicament to treat a particular illness, can this known medicament be patented under the provisions of Article 53(c) EPC and Article 54(5) EPC for use in a different, new and inventive treatment by therapy of the same illness?

(2) If the answer to question 1 is yes, is such patenting also possible where the only novel feature of the treatment is a new and inventive dosage regime?

(3) Are any special considerations applicable when interpreting and applying Article 53(c) EPC and Article 54(5) EPC?

== Answers to the referred questions ==
The Enlarged Board of Appeal answered these questions as follows:

(1) Where it is already known to use a medicament to treat an illness, Article 54(5) EPC does not exclude that this medicament be patented for use in a different treatment by therapy of the same illness.

(2) Such patenting is also not excluded where a dosage regime is the only feature claimed which is not comprised in the state of the art.

(3) Where the subject matter of a claim is rendered novel only by a new therapeutic use of a medicament, such claim may no longer have the format of a so called Swiss-type claim as instituted by decision G 5/83. A time-limit of three months after publication of the present decision in the Official Journal of the European Patent Office is set in order that future applicants comply with this new situation.

The first two answers mean that a new dosage regime of a drug can render patent claims novel and inventive. A patent having such claims may be granted provided the other requirements of the European Patent Convention are met. More specifically, the Enlarged Board of Appeal approved the following specific uses of known medications:

- treatments of a novel group of patients,
- alternate routes or modes of administration,
- technical effects leading to genuinely new applications.

Swiss-type claims were introduced in decision G 5/83, but the EPC 2000 removed the cause of that approach. The third answer means that European patents having Swiss-type claims cease.

== See also ==
- G 5/83, second medical indication, introducing Swiss-type claims that are obsolete in view of the present decision.
