= Phillips v. AWH Corp. =

- Court: United States Court of Appeals for the Federal Circuit
- Full case name: Edward H. Phillips v. AWH Corporation, Hopeman Brothers, Inc., and Lofton Corporation
- Decided: July 12 2005
- Citations: 415 F.3d 1303; 75 U.S.P.Q.2d 1321

Holding
- The most important source in the evidentiary hierarchy of claim construction is the ordinary meaning of the language of the claims themselves and other intrinsic sources like the prosecution history. Extrinsic evidence like dictionaries and expert testimony are of secondary importance.

Court membership
- Judges sitting: En banc Court: Chief Judge Paul Redmond Michel; Circuit Judges Pauline Newman, Haldane Robert Mayer, Alan David Lourie, Raymond C. Clevenger, Randall Ray Rader, Alvin Anthony Schall, William Curtis Bryson, Arthur J. Gajarsa, Richard Linn, Timothy B. Dyk, and Sharon Prost

Case opinions
- Majority: Bryson, joined by Michel, Clevenger, Rader, Schall, Gajarsa, Linn, Dyk, and Prost
- Concur/dissent: Lourie, joined by Newman
- Dissent: Mayer, joined by Newman

Laws applied
- 35 U.S.C. § 112

Phillips v. AWH Corp., 415 F.3d 1303 (Fed. Cir. 2005), was a case decided by the US Court of Appeals for the Federal Circuit en banc, that clarified the hierarchy of evidentiary sources usable for claim construction in patent law.

== Factual background ==
The patent at issue, U.S. Patent No. 4,677,798, was for modular steel shell panels that could be arranged into vandalism resistant walls. The panels interlocked by means of steel baffles - internal barriers meant to create fillable compartments or to deflect projectiles that penetrate the outer wall. Defendant AWH Corporation distributed similar modular panels, and Plaintiff, Phillips, sued AWH for patent infringement. AWH asserted that its panels did not meet all of the limitations of Phillips' patent claims. The District Court granted AWH's summary judgment motion for noninfringement because it read the term "baffles" in the claims to mean internal barriers angled at angles other than 90 degrees. AWH's panels had baffles angled at 90 degrees. Phillips appealed to the Federal Circuit. A 3-judge panel affirmed the judgment of noninfringement, but on different grounds from the District Court. The Federal Circuit then agreed to rehear the case en banc.

== Decision ==
=== Majority opinion ===
The majority opinion, written by Judge Bryson, began by clarifying the hierarchy of evidentiary source usable for claim construction. Most importantly, the words of the claims should be given their ordinary meaning in the context of the patent documents, as interpreted by a person of ordinary skill in the art to which the patent pertains. The court recognized that the patentee can act as his own lexicographer, and that the other claims and the specification can provide important clues to the intended meaning of the claim language. Also of importance in interpreting claim language is the prosecution history and other documents in the file wrapper. The prosecution history, however, should be viewed with more skepticism than the plain language of the claims themselves, because the prosecution represents a back and forth between the Patent Office and the inventor and lacks the clarity of the final claim language.

Other than the above cited intrinsic sources of evidence courts may also look to extrinsic evidence, though it is of secondary importance. Extrinsic evidence includes scholarly journal articles and expert testimony. Dictionaries may also be used, but the Federal Circuit repudiated the holding of an earlier case, Texas Digital, that suggested dictionaries could be accorded weight tantamount to the claim language itself.

Turning to the facts of the case at hand, the court held that the claim limitations did not indicate that the baffles could not be situated at 90 degree angles. The case was remanded to the District Court.

=== Lourie's concurrence in part and dissent in part ===
Judge Lourie praised the majority's analysis of the evidentiary hierarchy for claim construction. Lourie, however, thought that the District Court applied these principles correctly and that its claim construction should be affirmed.

=== Mayer-Newman's dissent ===
Judge Mayer, joined by Judge Newman, dissented asserting that the majority endorsed the problematic idea that claim construction is a matter of law reviewed de novo on appeal. Mayer argued that claim construction is similar to an obviousness determination, which is considered a factual finding (and thus subject to a "clear error" standard for appellate review).

On 20 January 2015, the U.S. Supreme Court issued a 7–2 decision in an unrelated case, Teva Pharmaceuticals USA, Inc. v. Sandoz, Inc. The opinion held that the Federal Circuit court must apply a "clear error" standard to review questions of fact. In accordance with Mayer-Newman's dissent in Phillips, this opinion ended de novo review by the Federal Circuit when reviewing the meaning of claim terms.
