= Printed matter (patent law) =

The term printed matter, in United States patent law, refers to information printed on or otherwise associated with an article of manufacture that is claimed to distinguish an article from similar articles already in the prior art. It was long used as a basis for rejecting claims, but in recent years the United States Court of Appeals for the Federal Circuit has disapproved of its use.

The legal analysis of this issue speaks in terms of "printed matter" that is imprinted upon a "substrate." For example, letters might be printed on a piece of paper as substrate, in an extreme case. Or digitized information (the printed matter), such as a jpeg file representative of the Mona Lisa, might be encoded in an EPROM memory chip as substrate. A computer program (the printed matter) might be encoded in a computer-readable medium such as a hard disk (the substrate)—and thus be the subject of a so-called Beauregard claim. The current legal analysis, as expressed in the definitive decision on printed matter, In re Gulack, is as follows: The differences between a newly claimed substrate bearing printed matter and a prior art substrate, where the only point of departure from the prior art is in the printed matter itself, are not entitled to patentable weight unless the printed matter and the substrate have a new and unobvious functional relationship. The analysis is thus essentially an obviousness analysis under section 103 of the patent law, rather than (as it was in earlier times) an analysis of statutory subject matter under what is now section 101 of the patent law.

"Printed matter” is evaluated in a two-step test.

- The first step of the “printed matter” analysis is the “determination that the limitation in question is in fact directed toward printed matter.” Only “printed lines or characters, useful and intelligible only to the human mind” and “indicia whose primary purpose is the conveying of intelligence to a reader” qualify as printed matter. The exception has “no factual relevance” when “the invention as defined by the claims requires that the information be processed not by the mind but by a machine, the computer.”
  - As “a necessary condition for falling into the category of printed matter, a limitation is printed matter only if it claims the content of information.” Language describing “where the information came from, its ‘origin,’ is not part of the informational content at all.”
- Only after satisfying all these tests under step one for “printed matter” does the inquiry proceed to step two, to ask whether the printed matter is functionally or structurally related to the associated physical substrate.

Patents of this type still issue. One example is Seagate's SeaShield patent, No. U.S. Pat. 5,732,464 (method of informing users how to configure disc drive by putting label on shield), which is claimed to provide a functional relationship between the printed information and the metal shield on which it is imprinted.

== USPTO practice ==
Practice in the United States Patent and Trademark Office is described in the USPTO Manual of Patent Examining Procedure, § 2111.05. Generally,

USPTO personnel must consider all claim limitations when determining patentability of an invention over the prior art. In re Gulack, 703 F.2d 1381, 1385, 217 USPQ 401, 403-04 (Fed. Cir. 1983). Since a claim must be read as a whole, USPTO personnel may not disregard claim limitations comprised of printed matter. See Gulack, 703 F.2d at 1384, 217 USPQ at 403; see also Diamond v. Diehr, 450 U.S. 175, 191, 209 USPQ 1, 10 (1981). However, USPTO personnel need not give patentable weight to printed matter absent a new and unobvious functional relationship between the printed matter and the substrate.

Examples where such a functional relationship is present include inventions in which "indicia on a measuring cup perform the function of indicating volume within that measuring cup" and in which " a hatband places a string of numbers in a certain physical relationship to each other such that a claimed algorithm is satisfied due to the physical structure of the hatband...." Examples where such a functional relationship is absent include inventions in which "a product merely serves as a support for printed matter," e.g., "a hatband with images displayed on the hatband but not arranged in any particular sequence" or "a deck of playing cards having images on each card." Even if such a relationship exists, it must still be new and unobvious to support patentability.
