= Patent claim =

Defined scope of legal protection

In a patent or patent application, the claims define in technical terms the extent, i.e. the scope, of the protection conferred by a patent, or the protection sought in a patent application. The claims particularly point out the subject matter which the inventor(s) regard as their invention. In other words, the purpose of the claims is to define which subject matter is protected by the patent (or sought to be protected by the patent application). This is termed as the "notice function" of a patent claim—to warn others of inventor rights and infringement liability. The claims are of paramount importance in both prosecution and litigation.

For instance, a claim could read:

- "An apparatus for catching mice, said apparatus comprising a base, a spring member coupled to the base, and ..."
- "A chemical composition for cleaning windows, said composition substantially consisting of 10–15% ammonia, ..."
- "Method for computing future life expectancies, said method comprising gathering data including X, Y, Z, analyzing the data, comparing the analyzed data results..."

== Background ==
In most jurisdictions, a patent is a right to exclude others from making, using, importing, selling or offering for sale the subject matter defined by the claims when the claim is for a thing (apparatus, composition of matter, system, etc.). If a claim is for a method, the right to exclude would be to exclude any single party from carrying out all the steps of the claim. In order to exclude someone from using a patented invention, the patent owner, or patentee, needs to demonstrate in a court proceeding that what the other person is using falls within the scope of a claim of the patent; therefore, it is more valuable to obtain claims that include the minimal set of limitations that differentiate an invention over what came before (i.e., the so-called prior art). But the fewer the limitations in a claim, the more likely it is that the claim will cover, or "read on", what came before and be rejected during examination or found to be invalid at a later time for obviousness or lack of novelty.

== History ==
Patents have not always contained claims. In many European countries, patents did not contain claims until the 1970s. Before that time, it was often difficult to decide whether a product infringed a patent, since the sole basis to know the extent of protection was the description, in view of the prior art.

Interestingly, American inventors started using claims in their patent applications decades before the authorities (either judicial or legislative) started to require claims in patents. The first person who used in a US patent application the term "claim" in its current meaning is believed to be Isaiah Jennings in 1807. Claims were recommended in published patents in the Third Patent Act (1836) and finally became mandatory in the Fourth Patent Act (1870).

However, even among patent legal systems in which the claims are used as the reference to decide the scope of protection conferred by a patent, the way the claims are used may vary substantially. Traditionally, two types of claiming systems exist:

- the "central claiming system", according to which the claims identify the "centre" of the patented invention. The exact scope of the protection depends on the actual nature of the inventor's contribution to the art in the concerned technology.
- the "peripheral claiming system", according to which the claims identify the exact periphery, or boundary, of the conferred protection. In this system, the burden of drafting good claims is much higher on the patent applicant (or on his or her counsel). The applicant receives the protection he or she requested and almost nothing more, provided that the invention is new and non-obvious. This theoretically makes it easier for third parties to examine whether infringement may exist or not.

No patent system today is a purely either central or peripheral, but the system used in Germany and most of the other countries of continental Europe is considered more central than the system currently used in the United Kingdom, the United States, and especially Japan, which are more peripheral. In recent years, Japan's system has become more peripheral, while the system used in the United States was becoming more central because of the increasing resort in US patent litigation to the doctrine of equivalents to expand claim scope unpredictably, until the US Supreme Court reversed that trend in the Warner-Jenkinson case in 1997.

== Requirements and structure ==
In most modern patent laws, patent applications must have at least one claim, which are critical defining elements of the patent and the primary subject of examination. In some patent laws however, a date of filing may be obtained for an application which does not contain any claim.

=== European Patent Convention ===
Under the European Patent Convention (EPC), a claim must define the matter for which the protection is sought in terms of technical features. The convention itself pertains to a procedure to secure a European patent. These technical features can be either structural (e.g. a nail, a rivet) or functional (e.g. fastening means).

Regarding the structure of a claim, under the EPC, what is called the "preamble" is different from the meaning the "preamble" has under U.S. patent law. In an independent claim in Europe, the preamble is everything which precedes the expression "characterized in that" or "characterized by" in a claim written according to the so-called "two-part form", and therefore everything which is regarded as known in combination within one prior art document, namely the closest prior art document. For this reason, in Europe, the preamble of a claim is sometimes also called "pre-characterizing portion".

=== United States ===
A claim may include the following parts:

- A preamble that recites the class of the invention, and optionally its primary properties, purpose, or field: "An apparatus..." "A therapeutic method for treating cancer..." "A composition having an affinity for protein X..." This preamble may also reference another claim and refine it, e.g., "The method of claim 1..." (See "dependent claim" below.).
- A "transitional" phrase that characterizes the elements that follow. The phrases "comprising", "containing" and "including" are most often used and (under some patent laws, specifically US) preferable, as it means "having at least the following elements..." and are therefore open (inclusive) and do not exclude additional limitations. The phrases "consisting of" and "consisting essentially of" are (under some patent laws, specifically US) more limiting, as they mean "having all and only" or "virtually only" and are therefore closed (exclusive). In the US, the phrase "consisting of" excludes additional limitations, while the phrase "consisting essentially of" excludes additional limitations that would "materially affect the basic and novel characteristic(s) of the claimed invention".
- A set of "limitations" that together describe the invention: "an X, a Y, and a Z connected to the X and the Y." The elements should be described as though they interact or cooperate to achieve the desired result. The distinction between elements and limitations is explained here.
- Optionally, a purpose clause that further describes the overall operation of the invention, or the goal that the invention achieves ("wherein the Z simultaneously controls the X and Y," or "wherein the Z accomplishes purpose W by controlling X and Y," etc.). "Wherein" clauses limit the scope of the claim. Other forms of purpose language are "whereby" and "thereby" clauses, similar to the "wherein" clauses just described, and statements of intended use in a claim preamble (depending on facts of case, preamble may or may not limit claim scope; in this case it was the "essence of the invention").

== Basic types and categories ==
There are two basic types of claims:

- the independent claims, which stand on their own, and
- the dependent claims, which depend on a single claim or on several claims and generally express particular embodiments as fall-back positions.

The expressions "in one embodiment", "in a preferred embodiment", "in a particular embodiment", "in an advantageous embodiment" or the like often appear in the description of patent applications and are used to introduce a particular implementation or method of carrying out the invention. These various embodiments may or may not each be claimed with specificity. They might serve as multiple examples of a more general "genus" that is claimed. In some cases the examiner might declare that what the applicant presented as variations of one invention are actually separate inventions that need to be examined individually.

An independent ("stand alone") claim does not refer to an earlier claim, whereas a dependent claim does refer to an earlier claim, assumes all of the limitations of that claim and then adds restrictions (e.g. "The handle of claim 2, wherein it is hinged.") Each dependent claim is, by law, narrower than the independent claim upon which it depends. Although this results in coverage narrower than provided by the independent claim upon which the second claim depends, it is additional coverage, and there are many advantages to the patent applicant in submitting and obtaining a full suite of dependent claims:

- Clarification/broadening of the independent claim: Independent claims are typically written with broad terms, to avoid permitting competitors to circumvent the claim by altering some aspect of the basic design. But when a broad wording is used, it may raise a question as to the scope of the term itself. If a dependent claim is specifically drawn to a narrower interpretation, then, at least in the U.S., the doctrine of claim differentiation states that the scope of the independent claim is strongly presumed be different from, and therefore broader than, the scope of the dependent claim. The doctrine dictates that it "is improper for courts to read into an independent claim a limitation explicitly set forth in another claim." This means that if an independent claim recites a chair with a plurality of legs, and a dependent claim depending from the independent recites a chair with four legs, the independent claim is not limited to what is recited in the dependent claim. The dependent claim protects chairs with four legs, and the independent claim protects chairs with four legs as well as chairs having two, three, five or more legs. Similarly, it may be unclear whether a "base" includes a "set of legs." A dependent claim, including the phrase, "wherein said base comprises a set of legs," if allowed by the patent examiner, clarifies that the word "base" in the independent claim does not necessarily include legs. In practice, dependent claims are often used to home in on the inventor's preferred embodiment of the invention (e.g., the actual product design that the inventor intends to use.) The independent claim broadly describes the invention; dependent claim #1 describes the invention in a narrower aspect that more specifically describes the preferred embodiment; dependent claim #2 is narrower still; etc.

- Possible invalidity of independent claim: It is impossible to know, when beginning the application process and even at the time of patent issuance, if a patent claim is valid. This is because any publication dated before the application's priority date and published anywhere in any language can invalidate the claim (excluding publications by the inventor published during the grace period in certain countries such as U.S., Canada and Japan). Furthermore, even applications that were not yet published at the time of filing, but have a priority date prior to the priority date of the application, can also invalidate the claim. As it is impossible to gain an absolute and complete knowledge of every publication on earth, not to mention unpublished patent applications, there is always some degree of uncertainty. If the independent claim is determined to be invalid, however, a dependent claim may nevertheless survive, and may still be broad enough to bar competitors from valuable commercial territory.

Under the European Patent Convention, when a claim in one particular category (see below), e.g. a process claim, depends on a claim from a different category, e.g. a product claim, it is not considered to be a dependent claim but an independent claim. Under U.S. law, this is still counted as a dependent claim, regardless of the class change.

The rules of claim drafting also permit "multiple dependent claims" that reference more than one other claim, e.g.: "3. Method of claim 1 or 2, further comprising..." The rules for this are quite specific: specific claims must be referenced ("the method of any of these other claims" is incorrect); the claims must be referenced in the alternative ("the method of claims 1 and 2" is incorrect); etc. While still acceptable, this claim style is seldom used in the U.S. because it is counted for filing fee purposes according to the number of claims that it references. Thus, if the claim depends from three former claims, it is counted for fee purposes as three dependent claims. In light of the "excess claim" fees currently imposed by the USPTO, this tactic can quickly become expensive. Multiple dependent claims are, however, very commonly used in other jurisdictions, including Europe.

Claims can also be classified in categories, i.e. in terms of what they claim. A claim can refer to

- a physical entity, i.e. a product (or material) or an apparatus (or device, system, article, ...). The claim is then called respectively "product claim" or "apparatus claim"; or
- an activity, i.e. a process (or method) or a use. The claim is then called respectively "process claim" (or method claim) or "use claim".

In the United States, these categories are referred to as the four statutory categories of invention, and they are: processes, machines, manufactures, and compositions of matter. Notably, printed matter (including data stored on a computer drive) and signals (such as transient electromagnetic waves, (see in Re Nujten).) do not belong to any of the four statutory categories and are not patentable in US. However, such signals are considered patentable by the European Patent Office (EPO).

The "process" claims have been the most controversial, particularly in cases, when processes involve transformations of non-statutory (and/or non-physical) entities, such as data into data, or electronic money exchange. Three US Supreme Court justices (Sonia Sotomayor, Ruth Bader Ginsburg, and Stephen Breyer) in their concurring opinion in Alice Corp. v. CLS Bank International suggested, that all business methods should be excluded from patentability: "[A]ny claim that merely describes a method of doing business does not qualify as a process under § 101." However, the SCOTUS refused to accept this position so far, and some business method patent claims are possible in the US, although the case law in the area is still evolving (see Software patents under United States patent law).

=== Special types of claims ===
In addition to aforementioned four statutory categories of claims, there are also many other "flavours" of claims, which are used in different circumstances. Sometimes a particular claim form is required by law if a patent is to be granted for a particular invention, such as for a second medical use of a known substance where the "Swiss-type" claim might be required. Another reason to use a particular claim might be to catch a particular class of infringer.

== Interpretation or claim construction ==
The claims often use precise language. Certain words commonly used in claims have specific legal meanings determined by one or more court decisions. These meanings may be different from common usage. For instance, the word "comprises", when used in the claims of a United States patent, means "consists at least of". By contrast, the word "consists" means "consists only of", which will lead to a very different scope of protection.

Construction, whether of a patent or any other document, is of course not directly concerned with what the author meant to say. There is no window into the mind of the patentee or the author of any other document. Construction is objective in the sense that it is concerned with what a reasonable person to whom the utterance was addressed would have understood the author to be using the words to mean. Notice, however, that it is not, as is sometimes said, "the meaning of the words the author used", but rather what the notional addressee would have understood the author to mean by using those words. The meaning of words is a matter of convention, governed by rules, which can be found in dictionaries and grammars. What the author would have been understood to mean by using those words is not simply a matter of rules. It is highly sensitive to the context of and background to the particular utterance. It depends not only upon the words the author has chosen but also upon the identity of the audience he is taken to have been addressing and the knowledge and assumptions which one attributes to that audience.

In U.S. patent practice at least, inventors may "act as their own lexicographer" in a patent application. That means that an inventor may give a common word or phrase a meaning that is very specific and different from the normal definition of said word or phrase. Thus a claim must be interpreted in light of the definitions provided in the specification of a patent. The specification of a patent is a written description of how to make and use the invention (see also: sufficiency of disclosure).

Traditionally the USPTO used for claims interpretation during patent examination a "broadest reasonable interpretation consistent with specification" standard, while the US courts in suits for patent infringement, during a Markman hearing, a claim is interpreted using a narrower standard. This duality (broader during examination, narrower during litigation) is used to prevent patentees from enforcing in courts broader claims than were examined by the USPTO. However, on November 13, 2018 the USPTO switched to the claim construction standard established by the Court of Appeals for the Federal Circuit in Phillips v. AWH Corp., 415 F.3d 1303 (Fed. Cir. 2005)

== See also ==
- Catnic Components Ltd. v. Hill & Smith Ltd. (1982)
- Claim chart
- Clearance search and opinion
- Cloem, a company creating computer-generated variants of patent claims
- Disclaimer
- Doctrine of equivalents
- Probatio diabolica, in relation to product-by-process claims
