= Article of manufacture =

Category in US patent law

In United States patent law, an article of manufacture (also termed a manufacture) is one of the four principal categories of things that may be patented. The other three are a process (also termed a method), a machine, and a composition of matter. In United States patent law, that same terminology has been in use since the first patent act in 1790 (with the exception that processes were formerly termed "arts").

In In re Nuitjen, the United States Court of Appeals for the Federal Circuit said:

The Supreme Court has defined "manufacture" (in its verb form) as "the production of articles for use from raw or prepared materials by giving to these materials new forms, qualities, properties, or combinations, whether by hand-labor or by machinery." Diamond v. Chakrabarty, 447 U.S. 303, 308 (1980) (quoting American Fruit Growers, Inc. v. Brogdex Co., 283 U.S. 1, 11 (1931). The term is used in the statute in its noun form, Bayer AG v. Housey Pharms., Inc., 340 F.3d 1367, 1373 (Fed. Cir. 2003), and therefore refers to "articles" resulting from the process of manufacture. The same dictionary the Supreme Court relied on for its definition of "manufacture" in turn defines "article" as "a particular substance or commodity: as, an article of merchandise; an article of clothing; salt is a necessary article." 1 Century Dictionary 326 (William Dwight Whitney ed., 1895). These definitions address "articles" of "manufacture" as being tangible articles or commodities.

Examples of articles of manufacture are ceramics, cast metal articles, hammers, crowbars, chairs, shovels, gloves, shoes, envelopes and mouse-pads. Articles of manufacture may have parts, but any interaction among the parts is usually static.

A natural article, even if subjected to a process, as when the rind of an orange is impregnated with borax to prevent decay, is not an article of manufacture. Thus, in American Fruit Growers, Inc. v. Brogdex Co., the Supreme Court held:

Addition of borax to the rind of natural fruit does not produce from the raw material an article for use which possesses a new or distinctive form, quality, or property. The added substance only protects the natural article against deterioration by inhibiting development of extraneous spores upon the rind. There is no change in the name, appearance, or general character of the fruit. It remains a fresh orange, fit only for the same beneficial uses as theretofore.

A signal is not an article of manufacture because intangible, incorporeal, transitory entities are not articles of manufacture.

== See also ==
- Printed matter (patent law)
