= Federal tribunals in the United States =

American federal courts

Federal tribunals in the United States are tribunals established by the federal government of the United States for the purpose of resolving disputes involving or arising under federal laws, including questions about the constitutionality of such laws. Such tribunals include both Article III tribunals (federal courts) as well as adjudicative entities which are classified as Article I or Article IV tribunals. Some of the latter entities are also formally denominated as courts, but they do not enjoy certain protections afforded to Article III courts. These tribunals are described in reference to the article of the United States Constitution from which the tribunal's authority stems. The use of the term "tribunal" in this context as a blanket term to encompass both courts and other adjudicative entities comes from section 8 of Article I of the Constitution, which expressly grants Congress the power to constitute tribunals inferior to the Supreme Court of the United States.

== Article III courts ==
Article III courts (also called Article III tribunals) are the U.S. Supreme Court and the inferior courts of the United States established by Congress, which currently are the 13 United States courts of appeals, the 91 United States district courts (including the districts of D.C. and Puerto Rico, but excluding the territorial district courts of the Northern Mariana Islands, Guam, and the Virgin Islands), and the U.S. Court of International Trade, and several other tribunals listed in the table at the end of the article. They constitute the judicial branch of the federal government (which is defined by Article III of the Constitution).

Pursuant to the Appointments Clause in Article II, all members of Article III tribunals are appointed by the President and confirmed by the Senate. These courts are protected against undue influence by the other branches of government. Judges may not have their salaries reduced during their tenure in office, and their appointment is for life—barring removal from office "on impeachment for, and conviction of, Treason, Bribery, or other high crimes and misdemeanors".

Under the Constitution, Congress can vest these courts with jurisdiction to hear cases involving the Constitution or federal law and certain cases involving disputes between citizens of different states or countries. Among the matters susceptible of judicial determination, but not requiring it, are: claims against the United States, the disposal of public lands and related claims, questions concerning membership in Indian tribes, and questions arising out of the administration of customs laws and the Internal Revenue Code.

The Foreign Intelligence Surveillance Court and its court of review, the Panel on Multidistrict Litigation, and the United States Alien Terrorist Removal Court are staffed by Article III judges (federal district court or appeals court judges) designated by the Chief Justice.

== Article I tribunals ==
Article I tribunals include Article I courts (typically called a "Board," "Commission," and occasionally "Court") set up by Congress to review agency decisions, military courts-martial appeal courts, ancillary courts with judges appointed by Article III appeals court judges, or administrative agencies and administrative law judges (ALJs). Most Article I judges are called "administrative law judges;" some have other titles such as "Administrative Patent Judge" or "Commissioner." Article I judges do not enjoy the same protections as their Article III counterparts. For example, these judges do not enjoy life tenure, and Congress may reduce their salaries.

The existence of Article I tribunals has long been controversial, and their power has been challenged numerous times. The Supreme Court has consistently affirmed their constitutionality, and it has delineated their power on several occasions. In Murray's Lessee v. Hoboken Land & Improvement Co. (59 U.S. (18 How.) 272 (1856)) the Supreme Court ruled that some legal matters, specifically those involving public rights, are inherently judicial, and thus Article I tribunal decisions are susceptible to review by an Article III court. Later, in Ex parte Bakelite Corp. (279 U.S. 438 (1929)), the Court declared that Article I courts "may be created as special tribunals to examine and determine various matters, arising between the government and others, which from their nature do not require judicial determination and yet are susceptible of it". In Oil States Energy Services, LLC v. Greene's Energy Group, LLC (584 U.S. 325 (2018)) the court reaffirmed that a "public right" could be adjudicated by an Article I intra-agency tribunal, subject to review in an Article III court.

In Dynes v. Hoover (61 U.S. (20 How.) 65 (1856)) the Supreme Court upheld Congress's power to establish courts martial under Article I as entirely separate from its powers under Article III.

== Article IV tribunals ==
Article IV tribunals are the United States territorial courts, established in territories of the United States by the United States Congress, pursuant to its power under Article Four of the United States Constitution, the Territorial Clause. (Some sources consider these territorial courts to be subsumed under the category of Article I legislative courts, as they are created by Congress pursuant to its Article IV powers.) Many United States territorial courts are defunct because the territories under their jurisdictions have become states or have been retroceded.

An example of a territorial court is the High Court of American Samoa, a court established pursuant to the Constitution of American Samoa. As an unincorporated territory, the Ratification Act of 1929 vested all civil, judicial and military powers in the President, who in turn delegated authority to the Secretary of the Interior in Executive Order 10264, who in turn promulgated the Constitution of American Samoa, which authorizes the court. As such, the Secretary retains ultimate authority over the courts.

Other United States territorial courts still in existence are:

- District Court for the Northern Mariana Islands
- District Court of Guam
- District Court of the Virgin Islands

=== Article III Court for Puerto Rico ===
Before 1966, the United States District Court in Puerto Rico was an Article IV court. In 1966, President Lyndon B. Johnson signed Pub. L. 89–571, 80 Stat. 764, which transformed the Article IV federal district court in Puerto Rico into an Article III court. This Act of Congress was not enacted pursuant to Article IV of the Constitution, the Territorial Clause, but rather under Article III. This marks the only occasion in United States history in which Congress has established an Article III court in an area that is not a state other than the District of Columbia. From then on, judges appointed to serve on the Puerto Rico federal district court have been Article III judges appointed under the Constitution of the United States. Like their mainland counterparts, they are entitled to life tenure and salary protection.

This important change in the federal judicial structure of the island was implemented not as a request of the Commonwealth government, but rather at the repeated request of the Judicial Conference of the United States.

The District Court of Puerto Rico is part of the First Circuit, which sits in Boston.

== Supreme Court rulings limiting the power of Article I and Article IV tribunals ==
The concept of a legislative court was first defined by Chief Justice John Marshall in the case of American Ins. Co. v. 356 Bales of Cotton, 26 U.S. (1 Pet.) 511 (1828), which is sometimes referred to as Canter, after a claimant in the case. In this case, a court in what was then the Territory of Florida had made a ruling on the disposition of some bales of cotton that had been recovered from a sunken ship. This clearly fell into the realm of admiralty law, which is part of the federal judicial power according to Article III of the Constitution. Yet the judges of the Florida Territorial Court had four-year terms, not the lifetime appointments required by Article III of the Constitution. Marshall's solution was to declare that territorial courts were established under Article I of the constitution. As such, they could not exercise the federal judicial power, and therefore the law that placed admiralty cases in their jurisdiction was unconstitutional.

Tenure that is guaranteed by the Constitution is a badge of a judge of an Article III court. The argument that mere statutory tenure is sufficient for judges of Article III courts was authoritatively answered in Ex parte Bakelite Corp.:

[T]he argument is fallacious. It mistakenly assumes that whether a court is of one class or the other depends on the intention of Congress, whereas the true test lies in the power under which the court was created and in the jurisdiction conferred. Nor has there been any settled practice on the part of Congress which gives special significance to the absence or presence of a provision respecting the tenure of judges. This may be illustrated by two citations. The same Congress that created the Court of Customs Appeals made provision for five additional circuit judges and declared that they should [370 U.S. 530, 597] hold their offices during good behavior; and yet the status of the judges was the same as it would have been had that declaration been omitted. In creating courts for some of the Territories Congress failed to include a provision fixing the tenure of the judges; but the courts became legislative courts just as if such a provision had been included.

In Glidden Co. v. Zdanok, the court made the following statement regarding courts in unincorporated territories:

Upon like considerations, Article III has been viewed as inapplicable to courts created in unincorporated territories outside the mainland, Downes v. Bidwell, 182 U.S. 244, 266-267; Balzac v. Porto Rico, 258 U.S. 298, 312-313; cf. Dorr v. United States, 195 U.S. 138, 145, 149, and to the consular courts established by concessions from foreign countries, In re Ross, 140 U.S. 453, 464-465, 480.

Ever since Canter, the federal courts have been wrestling with the division between legislative and judicial courts. The Supreme Court most thoroughly delineated the permissible scope of Article I tribunals in Northern Pipeline Co. v. Marathon Pipe Line Co., 458 U.S. 50 (1982), striking down the Bankruptcy Reform Act of 1978 that created the original U.S. bankruptcy courts. The Court noted in that opinion that the framers of the Constitution had developed a scheme of separation of powers which clearly required that the judiciary be kept independent of the other two branches via the mechanism of lifetime appointments. This decision was subsequently revisited and affirmed in Stern v. Marshall, 564 U.S. 462 (2011). However, the Court noted three situations (based on historical understanding) in which Congress could give judicial power to non-Article III courts:

1. Courts for non-state areas (U.S. territories and the District of Columbia) in which Congress is acting as both local and national government.
2. Military courts (or courts-martial), under the historical understanding and clearly laid out exceptions in the Constitution.
3. Legislative courts established under the premise that, where Congress could have simply given the Executive Branch the power to make a decision, it has the lesser power to create a tribunal to make that decision. This power is limited to adjudication of public rights, such as the settling of disputes between the citizens and the government.

The Court also found that Congress has the power under Article I to create adjunct tribunals, so long as the "essential attributes of judicial power" stay in Article III courts. This power derives from two sources. First, when Congress creates rights, it can require those asserting such rights to go through an Article I tribunal. Second, Congress can create non-Article III tribunals to help Article III courts deal with their workload, but only if the Article I tribunals are under the control of the Article III courts. The bankruptcy courts, as well as the tribunals of magistrate judges who decide some issues in the district courts, fall within this category of "adjunct" tribunals. All actions heard in an Article I tribunal are subject to de novo review in the supervising Article III court, which retains the exclusive power to make and enforce final judgments.

Pursuant to Congress' authority under Article IV, §3, of the Constitution to "make all needful Rules and Regulations respecting the Territory or other Property belonging to the United States"; Congress may create territorial courts and vest them with subject-matter jurisdiction over causes arising under both federal law and local law. But "the Supreme Court long ago determined that in the 'unincorporated' territories, such as American Samoa, the guarantees of the Constitution apply only insofar as its 'fundamental limitations in favor of personal rights' express 'principles which are the basis of all free government which cannot be with impunity transcended'."

The Supreme Court noted in Commodity Futures Trading Commission v. Schor, 478 U.S. 833 (1986), that parties to litigation may voluntarily waive their right to an Article III tribunal and thereby submit themselves to a binding judgment from an Article I tribunal. However, the Supreme Court later noted in Stern v. Marshall, 564 U.S. ___ (2011), that a party's right to an Article III tribunal is not always voluntarily waiveable in an Article I tribunal for suits at common law. Similarly, in Granfinanciera, S. A. v. Nordberg, 492 U.S. 33 (1989), the Court noted that a litigant's right to jury trial under the Seventh Amendment is also not generally waivable in an Article I tribunal for suits at common law. The Supreme Court further noted in Granfinanciera and Stern the parallel analysis of rights under Article III and the Seventh Amendment.

Article IV judges, in that capacity, cannot sit on the United States Courts of Appeals or decide an appeal as part of such panels.

== List of Article I, Article III and Article IV tribunals ==
Article I tribunals	Article III tribunals	Article IV tribunals
D.C. Court of Appeals; Superior Court of the District of Columbia; United States magistrate judges; United States bankruptcy courts; United States Court of Appeals for the Armed Forces; Army Court of Criminal Appeals; Navy-Marine Corps Court of Criminal Appeals; Air Force Court of Criminal Appeals; Coast Guard Court of Criminal Appeals; United States Court of Appeals for Veterans Claims; Board of Veterans' Appeals; United States Tax Court; Court of Indian Appeals; Court of Indian Offenses; United States International Trade Commission; United States Court of Federal Claims; Boards of contract appeals: Armed Services Board of Contract Appeals; Civilian Board of Contract Appeals; Office of Dispute Resolution for Acquisition; Postal Service Board of Contract Appeals; Tennessee Valley Authority Board of Contract Appeals; Social Security Administration's Office of Hearings Operations; United States Merit Systems Protection Board; Office of Special Masters of the U.S. Court of Federal Claims ("Vaccine court"); Patent Trial and Appeal Board; Trademark Trial and Appeal Board; United States courts-martial; United States Court of Military Commission Review; Guantanamo military commissions; USDA Office of Hearings and Appeals; USDA National Appeals Division; USDA Office of Administrative Law Judges; USDA Office of the Judicial Officer; Occupational Safety and Health Review Commission; HHS Departmental Appeals Board; CMS Provider Reimbursement Review Board; United States Court of Customs and Patent Appeals (1929–1958); United States Court of Customs Appeals (1909–1929)	Supreme Court of the United States; United States courts of appeals; United States district courts; United States Court of International Trade; United States Alien Terrorist Removal Court; United States Foreign Intelligence Surveillance Court of Review; United States Foreign Intelligence Surveillance Court; United States Court of Claims (1855–1982); United States Court of Customs and Patent Appeals (1958–1982); Temporary Emergency Court of Appeals (1971–1973); Judicial Panel on Multidistrict Litigation	United States territorial courts; High Court of American Samoa; District Court of Guam; District Court for the Northern Mariana Islands; District Court of the Virgin Islands; United States District Court in Puerto Rico (before 1966)

== Article II tribunals ==
Article II tribunals are constituted unilaterally by the executive branch. They are quite rare, and include military commissions not established by Congress.

The United States Court for Berlin was also an Article II tribunal. However, when the court heard its only case in 1979, the Department of State selected Herbert Jay Stern, an Article III judge, to adjudicate it.

== The hybrid courts of the District of Columbia ==
Under O'Donoghue v. United States, a court situated in the District of Columbia may be a hybrid of Article III court and Article I tribunal at the same time. When O'Donoghue was decided, the District's courts handled both federal law cases and local law cases, and the common understanding was that they were legislative courts under either Article I or Article IV because Article III courts cannot have jurisdiction over cases arising under local law. However, the Supreme Court resolved that constitutional issue by declaring that they were both. Courts in the District are the only ones that can be constitutionally created this way. In 1970, Congress split the duties of those two courts among four courts: two for local law and two for federal law. The local-law courts are Article I tribunals. The federal-law courts were explicitly created under Article III. No hybrid court currently exists.

== See also ==
- Chapter III Court — analogous concept in Australian law
- State court (United States)
- Tribunals in the United Kingdom
