= Postal Service Board of Contract Appeals =

The Postal Service Board of Contract Appeals (PSBCA) is a neutral, independent tribunal with the authority to hear and decide any appeal from a decision of a contracting officer of the United States Postal Service (USPS) or the Postal Regulatory Commission related to a contract with either agency. The PSBCA is within the USPS Judicial Officer Department, with the Judicial Officer also serving as the PSBCA Chairman. The PSBCA’s jurisdiction over contract disputes parallels that of the United States Court of Federal Claims with the contractor generally having the option of filing an appeal with either the PSBCA or the court.

The PSBCA, including its predecessor, the Post Office Department Board of Contract Appeals (PODBCA), has been in existence since at least 1959. However, amendments to the Contract Disputes Act of 1978, effective in January 2007, expressly established a Postal Service Board of Contract Appeals and specified its jurisdiction.

Decisions of the PSBCA since 1986 may generally be found at the USPS website. Those decisions and earlier decisions of the PSBCA and PODBCA may be found at commercial legal research services, such as Westlaw and LexisNexis.

== See also ==
- Contract Disputes Act of 1978
- Civilian Board of Contract Appeals
- Armed Services Board of Contract Appeals
- United States Court of Federal Claims
- United States Court of Appeals for the Federal Circuit
