= Mount Winthrop =

Mountain in Washington (state), United States

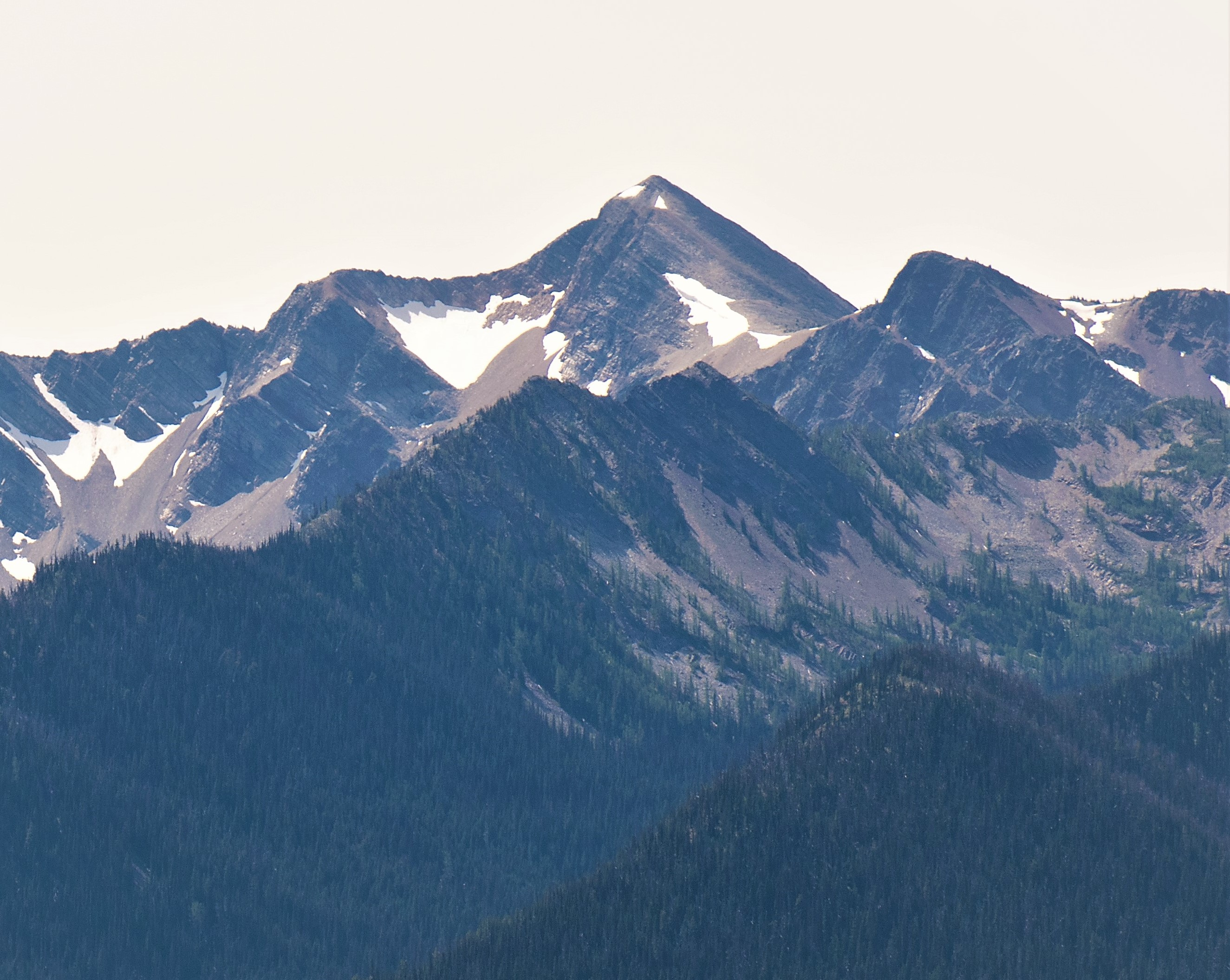
- North aspect

Highest point
- Elevation: 7,850 ft (2,393 m)
- Prominence: 1,690 ft (515 m)
- Parent peak: Three Fools Peak
- Isolation: 4.34 mi (6.98 km)
- Coordinates: 48°58′22″N 120°46′03″W

Geography
- Location within Washington (state) Location within the United States
- Interactive map of Mount Winthrop
- Location: Pasayten Wilderness; Okanogan County; Washington, US
- Parent range: Hozameen Range; North Cascades; Cascade Range
- Topo map: USGS Castle Peak

Climbing
- First ascent: 1940

Mount Winthrop is a prominent 7,850-foot (2,393-metre) mountain summit located in Okanogan County of Washington state in the United States. The mountain is part of the Hozameen Range of the North Cascades and is situated two miles (3.2 km) south of the Canada–United States border within the Pasayten Wilderness, on land managed by the Okanogan–Wenatchee National Forest. The nearest higher peak is Frosty Mountain, 4.6 miles (7.4 km) to the northwest. Precipitation runoff from the mountain drains into tributaries of the Similkameen River. Like many North Cascades peaks, Mount Winthrop is more notable for its steep rise above local terrain than for its absolute elevation. Topographic relief is significant as the west aspect rises 2,850 feet (870 m) above Route Creek in 1.0 mile (1.6 km). The Pacific Northwest Trail traverses the southeast slope of the mountain and the Pacific Crest Trail traverses the western base of the mountain.

== History ==
The first ascent of the summit was likely made in 1940 by Everett Darr and H.L. Frewing. There is no record of the namesake for this mountain, however in Washington the town of Winthrop and the Winthrop Glacier are both named after Theodore Winthrop who toured the Washington Territory in 1853 and wrote of it in his book, The Canoe and the Saddle. He had an interest in the local mountains as he was the original advocate that Mount Rainier and Mount Baker should instead be called by their Native American names, "Tacoma" and "Kulshan" respectively.

== Geology ==
The North Cascades features some of the most rugged topography in the Cascade Range with craggy peaks, granite spires, ridges, and deep glacial valleys. Geological events occurring many years ago created the diverse topography and drastic elevation changes over the Cascade Range leading to various climate differences.

The history of the formation of the Cascade Mountains dates back millions of years ago to the late Eocene Epoch. With the North American Plate overriding the Pacific Plate, episodes of volcanic igneous activity persisted. In addition, small fragments of the oceanic and continental lithosphere called terranes created the North Cascades about 50 million years ago.

During the Pleistocene period dating back over two million years ago, glaciation advancing and retreating repeatedly scoured the landscape leaving deposits of rock debris. The U-shaped cross section of the river valleys is a result of recent glaciation. Uplift and faulting in combination with glaciation have been the dominant processes which have created the tall peaks and deep valleys of the North Cascades area.

== Climate ==
Most weather fronts originate in the Pacific Ocean, and travel northeast toward the Cascade Mountains. As fronts approach the North Cascades, they are forced upward by the peaks (orographic lift), causing them to drop their moisture in the form of rain or snowfall onto the Cascades. As a result, the west side of the North Cascades experiences higher precipitation than the east side, especially during the winter months in the form of snowfall. During winter months weather is usually cloudy, but due to high pressure systems over the Pacific Ocean that intensify during summer months, there is often little or no cloud cover during the summer.

== Gallery ==
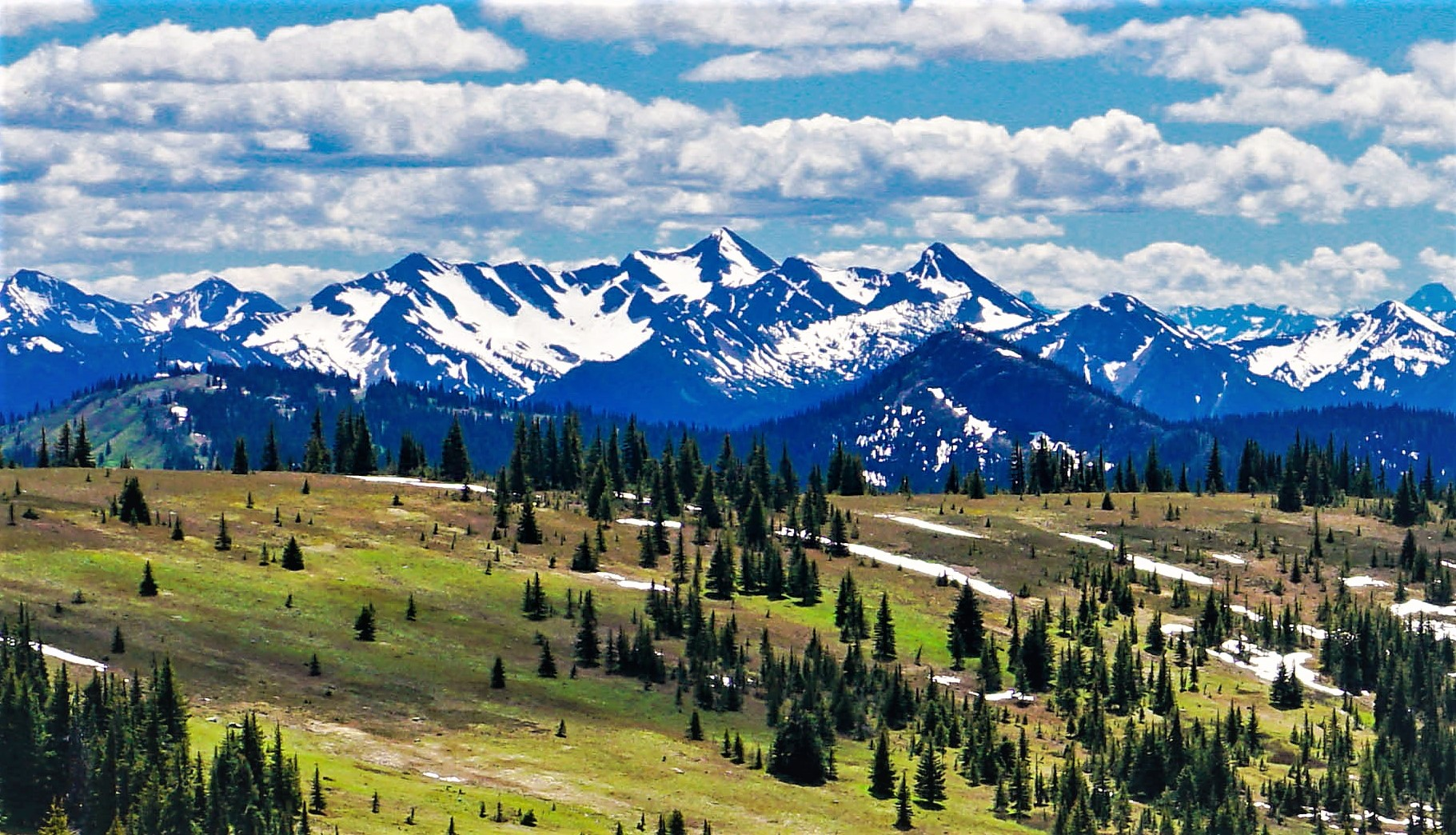
Mount Winthrop centered, seen from Manning Park

== See also ==
- Geography of the North Cascades
- Geology of the Pacific Northwest
