= Copyright Act of 1831 =

U.S. federal copyright legislation

- Long title: An Act to Amend the Several Acts Respecting Copyrights
- Effective: February 3, 1831

Citations
- Statutes at Large: 4 Stat. 436

Legislative history
- Introduced in the House of Representatives as H.R. 145 by William W. Ellsworth (AJ–CT) on January 21, 1830; Committee consideration by House Judiciary Committee, Senate Judiciary Committee; Passed the House on January 10, 1831 (81-31); Passed the Senate on January 29, 1831; Signed into law by President Andrew Jackson on February 3, 1831

United States Supreme Court cases
- Wheaton v. Peters; Backus v. Gould; Stephens v. Cady; Stevens v. Gladding; Little v. Hall

The Copyright Act of 1831 was the first major revision to the U.S. Copyright Law. The bill is largely the result of lobbying efforts by American lexicographer Noah Webster.

The key changes in the Act included:

- Extension of the original copyright term from 14 years to 28 years, with an option to renew the copyright for another 14 years
- Addition of musical compositions to the list of statutorily protected works (though this protection only extended to reproductions of compositions in printed form; the public performance right was not recognized until later)
- Changes in copyright formality requirements

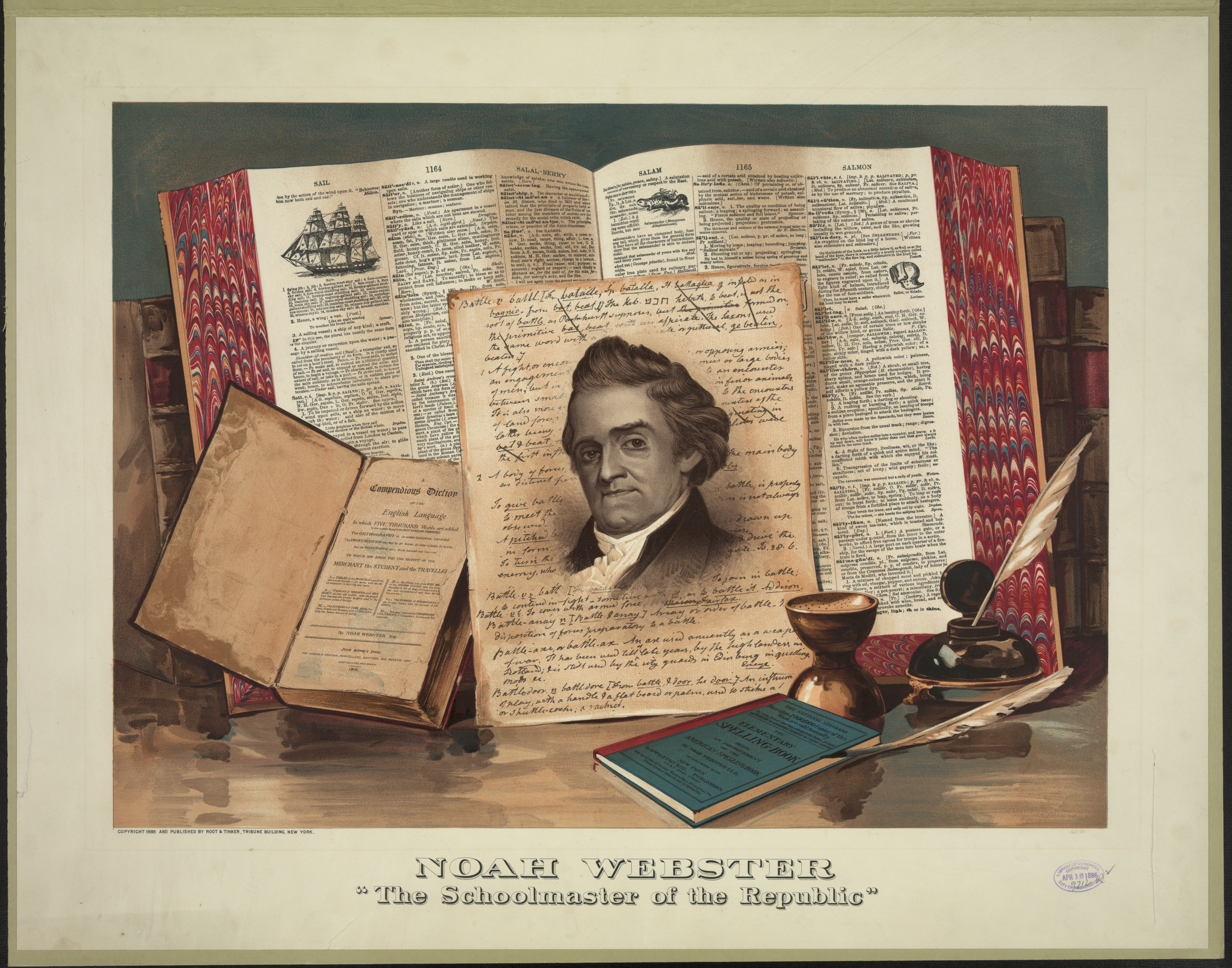
Noah Webster, most widely known for his dictionary, lobbied to amend the Copyright Act

== Amendments ==
The law was amended a number of times for a wide variety of purposes.

- In 1834, Congress allowed a copyright to be transferred to someone else, a record of which had to be made within 60 days.
- In 1846, Congress established the requirement of depositing copies of the work at the Library of Congress and the Smithsonian, in addition to the copies already required to be deposited with the Secretary of State.
- In 1855, Congress provided free postage for sending works to be deposited.
- In 1856, copyright was expanded to the right to restrict public performance of a work.
- In 1859, the requirement of depositing copies of the work at the Library of Congress and the Smithsonian was repealed.
- In 1861, copyright cases were allowed to be heard by the United States Supreme Court, regardless of the amount of money at stake.
- In 1865, Congress made photographs copyrightable. The constitutionality of this amendment was challenged but upheld by the Supreme Court in Burrow-Giles Lithographic Co. v. Sarony.
- Also in 1865, the practice of depositing a copy with the Library of Congress was reestablished, requiring deposit within one month.
- In 1867, the Librarian of Congress Ainsworth Spofford lobbied for a penalty of $25 for books that failed to be deposited within one month.

== See also ==
- Copyright Act of 1790
- Copyright Act of 1909
