= Stephen M. Daniels =

American lawyer

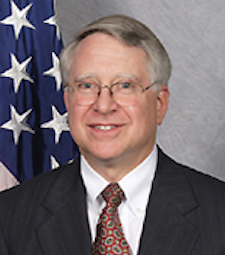

1st Chair of the United States Civilian Board of Contract Appeals
- In office January 6, 2007 – September 30, 2017
- President: George W. Bush; Barack Obama; Donald Trump
- Succeeded by: Jeri Somers

Personal details
- Born: Stephen Manley Daniels; March 28, 1947 (age 79) Boston, Massachusetts
- Party: Republican
- Spouse: Maygene Frost (m. 1972)
- Education: Yale University (BA, JD)

Military service
- Branch/service: United States Army
- Years of service: 1970–1971
- Unit: Signal Corps

Stephen Manley Daniels (born March 28, 1947) is an American lawyer. He served on the Republican staff of the United States House Committee on Government Operations from 1973 to 1987, after which he was appointed to the General Services Board of Contract Appeals (GSBCA). He was appointed chair of the board on December 22, 1992, and served until January 6, 2007, when he was appointed member and chair of the GSBCA's successor, the Civilian Board of Contract Appeals.

Daniels was born in Boston and grew up in Los Angeles. He attended Palisades High School, Yale College, and Yale Law School. He is married to Maygene Frost Daniels, the former chief archivist of the National Gallery of Art in Washington, D.C.
