= Jeri Somers =

American lawyer

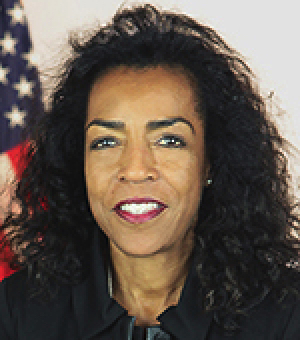

2nd Chair of the United States Civilian Board of Contract Appeals
- In office October 1, 2017 – May 31, 2021
- President: Donald Trump; Joe Biden
- Preceded by: Stephen M. Daniels
- Succeeded by: Erica S. Beardsley

Personal details
- Born: Jeri Kaylene Somers; 1961 (age 64–65) Wichita, Kansas, U.S.
- Education: George Mason University; American University

Military service
- Allegiance: United States
- Branch/service: United States Air Force
- Years of service: 1986–2007
- Rank: Lieutenant colonel
- Unit: J.A.G. Corps

Jeri Kaylene Somers (born 1961) is chair of the Civilian Board of Contract Appeals and is a former nominee for judge of the United States Court of Federal Claims.

== Biography ==
Somers received a Bachelor of Arts degree in 1983 from George Mason University. She received a Juris Doctor in 1986 from the American University Washington College of Law. She began her career as a judge advocate with the United States Air Force, from 1986 to 1991. She continued her service in the United States Air Force Reserves from 1991 to 1993, and in the District of Columbia Air National Guard from 1993 to 2004. Her military service concluded as a military judge with the United States Air Force Reserves from 2004 to 2007, retiring with the rank of lieutenant colonel. She has held a number of civilian positions concurrently with her military service. From 1991 to 1994, she served as a trial attorney in the Commercial Litigation Branch of the United States Department of Justice Civil Division. From 1994 to 2001, she served as an Assistant United States Attorney in the Eastern District of Virginia. From 2001 to 2003, she worked at the law firm of Miller & Chevalier in Washington, D.C. From 2003 to 2007, she served as an administrative judge for the United States Department of Transportation's Board of Contract Appeals. Since 2007, she has served as a judge of the Civilian Board of Contract Appeals. She served as vice chair of the board from 2008 until her appointment as chair on October 1, 2017. She also serves as a faculty member at George Washington University Law School with the title of professorial lecturer in law.

=== Publication ===
Somers has written The Boards of Contract Appeals: A Historical Perspective that discusses the evolution of the various Boards of Contract Appeals and their role in dispute resolution in government procurement and the relationship of the boards with the Federal Circuit.

== Expired nomination to claims court ==
On May 21, 2014, President Obama nominated Somers to serve as a judge of the United States Court of Federal Claims, to the seat vacated by Judge George W. Miller, who retired from the court. She received a hearing on her nomination on Tuesday, June 24, 2014. On July 17, 2014, her nomination was reported out of committee by voice vote.

On December 16, 2014, her nomination was returned to the President due to the sine die adjournment of the 113th Congress. On January 7, 2015, President Obama renominated her to the same position. On February 26, 2015, her nomination was reported out of committee by voice vote. Her nomination expired on January 3, 2017, with the end of the 114th Congress.
