= Laura Winthrop Johnson =

- Born: September 13, 1825; New Haven
- Died: January 14, 1889
- Occupations: Writer, poet
- Parents: Francis Bayard Winthrop, Jr. (father); Elizabeth Winthrop (mother)
- Relatives: Theodore Winthrop, William Winthrop

Laura Winthrop Johnson (September 13, 1825 – January 14, 1889) was an American author and poet.

Laura Winthrop was born on September 13, 1825 in New Haven, Connecticut. She was the daughter of Francis Bayard Winthrop and Elizabeth Woolsey, sister of Theodore Dwight Woolsey. Her siblings included novelist Theodore Winthrop and military lawyer William Winthrop. As a child, she was the subject of the poem "To Laura W- Two Years of Age" by Nathaniel Parker Willis. In 1846, she married W. Templeton Johnson.

Though raised in New Haven, she spent most of her life in Staten Island. She published poetry, including "On Picket Duty," a terza rima from the point of view of a Union soldier, which appeared in The Atlantic in April 1864. In 1884, she published Life and Poems of Theodore Winthrop, a tribute to her deceased brother killed in the Civil War, whose literary reputation shortly after his death was quite high.

She accompanied her husband on a lengthy trip to Wyoming. At the suggestion of her friend Annie Adams Fields, she kept a travel journal that was published in Lippincott's Magazine in June and July 1875 and as the volume Eight Hundred Miles in an Ambulance in 1889. It contains vivid descriptions of Laramie Peak, the Sun Dance, Sitting Bull, and Red Cloud. It also contains her oft-quoted unromantic description of cowboys as "rough men with shaggy hair and wild, staring eyes, in butternut trousers stuffed into great rough boots."

Winthrop Johnson died on 14 January 1889 in Staten Island.

== Bibliography ==
- Little Blossom's Reward (Boston, 1854) as Emily Hare
- Poems of Twenty Years (New York, 1874)
- Life and Poems of Theodore Winthrop (New York, 1884)
- Longfellow Prose Birthday Book (Boston, 1888)
- Eight Hundred Miles in an Ambulance (Philadelphia: J. P. Lippincott, 1889)
