= Dynes v. Hoover =

- Supreme Court of the United States

Decided February 1, 1858
- Full case name: Dynes v. Hoover
- Citations: 61 U.S. 65 (more)

Holding
- Congress's power to establish military tribunals under Article I is completely separate from its power to create Article III courts.

Court membership
- Chief Justice Roger B. Taney Associate Justices John McLean · James M. Wayne; John Catron · Peter V. Daniel; Samuel Nelson · Robert C. Grier; John A. Campbell · Nathan Clifford

Case opinion
- Majority: Wayne, joined by unanimous

Dynes v. Hoover, 61 U.S. (20 How.) 65 (1858), was a United States Supreme Court case in which the court held that Congress's power to establish military tribunals under Article I is completely separate from its power to create Article III courts. As a result, a judgment of a military tribunal cannot be collaterally attacked with an appeal to Article III courts, and the scope of a defendant's rights is determined entirely by statutory interpretation or the customs of the military.

== Background ==
Dynes was a seaman in the Navy, who was tried by a court martial upon a charge of desertion. He was found not guilty of deserting but guilty of attempting to desert, and sentenced him to discharged from the service and to be confined for six months in the penitentiary of the Washington, D.C. at hard labor, without pay. Dynes's conviction and sentence was approved by Secretary of the Navy James C. Dobbin, on September 26, 1854. Dynes was then brought from New York to Washington aboard the USS Engineer, and President Franklin Pierce ordered him to be incarcerated.

Dynes challenged his conviction on some grounds, including that the court martial had no jurisdiction over him and that the President did not have the authority to make such an order.

== Opinion of the court ==
The Supreme Court issued an opinion on February 1, 1858.

== Later developments ==
The significance of this case expanded greatly after it was cited in William Winthrop's scholarly work arguing that the system of court martial was an "instrumentality" for the Executive branch to use to enforce discipline in the military. Thus, for Winthrop, it was acceptable under the Constitution for the executive branch to be in the business of trying, convicting, and even executing people of its own volition. Near these statements, Winthrop cited Dynes correctly for the proposition that courts martial are Article I tribunals. However, judges who read Winthrop began to summarily cite Dynes incorrectly as authority for Winthrop's larger point, and the executive instrumentality interpretation became the "traditional view." The wisdom of this policy has been questioned since.
