= Murray's Lessee v. Hoboken Land & Improvement Co. =

John Den, ex dem. James B. Murray et al. v. The Hoboken Land & Improvement Company
- Supreme Court of the United States

Decided February 19, 1856
- Full case name: John Den, ex dem. James B. Murray et al. v. The Hoboken Land & Improvement Company
- Citations: 59 U.S. 272 (more) 18 How. 272; 15 L. Ed. 372; 1855 U.S. LEXIS 698; 2 A.F.T.R. (P-H) 2205

Court membership
- Chief Justice Roger B. Taney Associate Justices John McLean · James M. Wayne; John Catron · Peter V. Daniel; Samuel Nelson · Robert C. Grier; Benjamin R. Curtis · John A. Campbell

Case opinion
- Majority: Curtis, joined by unanimous

Den ex dem. Murray v. Hoboken Land & Improv. Co., 59 U.S. (18 How.) 272 (1856), was a case before the United States Supreme Court in which the court held that a distress warrant, issued pursuant to issued by the Solicitor of the Treasury under an act of Congress, was valid and constitutional. It was a use of an Article I tribunal.

== Background ==
=== Facts ===
Three cases came up from the circuit Court of the United States for the district of New Jersey, upon a certificate of division in opinion between the judges thereof. The dispute arose from attempts to recover money embezzled by Customs agents at the Port of New York who purchased land with stolen money.

This case arose from an action of ejectment, in which both parties claimed title to certain property. Defendants claimed title under a sale by virtue of what was referred to as a distress warrant, issued by the solicitor of the treasury under an act of Congress.

=== Circuit court ===
The judges for the court below were in disagreement as to whether the sale was valid in that there was some question as to whether the statute that produced the distress warrant proceeding was constitutional.

This action arose from a certified question from the Circuit Court of the United States for the District of New Jersey, in which the judges could not agree whether a distress warrant, issued pursuant to statute, was valid and constitutional.

== Decision ==
The United States Supreme Court found that under the Constitution of the United States, an individual from whom a balance of account had been found due would not be deprived of his liberty, or property by having payment of that balance enforced, without the exercise of the judicial power of the United States. A distress warrant, issued by the solicitor of the treasury under the act of Congress passed on the 15th May, 1820, (3 Stats. at Large, 592,) is consistent with the Constitution.

The Court also found that after the levy of the distress warrant had begun, the individual could bring before a district court the question of whether he was actually indebted as recited in the warrant.

Thus, the Court answered the lower court's question by finding that there was no constitutional problem with the distress warrant and that the sale was valid.

The Court responded to the questions presented by the lower court by declaring that the statutory basis for the distress warrant proceeding at issue was not in conflict with the constitutional guarantee of due process.

== See also ==
- List of United States Supreme Court cases, volume 59
- Samuel Swartwout, Collector of Customs for the Port of New York 1829-1838
