= List of United States Supreme Court cases, volume 55 =

Supreme Court of the United States
- Interactive map of Supreme Court of the United States
- 38°53′26″N 77°00′16″W
- Established: March 4, 1789; 236 years ago
- Location: Washington, D.C.
- Coordinates: 38°53′26″N 77°00′16″W
- Composition method: Presidential nomination with Senate confirmation
- Authorised by: Constitution of the United States, Art. III, § 1
- Judge term length: life tenure, subject to impeachment and removal
- Number of positions: 9 (by statute)
- Website: supremecourt.gov

This is a list of cases reported in volume 55 (14 How.) of United States Reports, decided by the Supreme Court of the United States in 1852 and 1853.

== Nominative reports ==
In 1874, the U.S. government created the United States Reports, and retroactively numbered older privately published case reports as part of the new series. As a result, cases appearing in volumes 1–90 of U.S. Reports have dual citation forms; one for the volume number of U.S. Reports, and one for the volume number of the reports named for the relevant reporter of decisions (these are called "nominative reports").

=== Benjamin Chew Howard ===
Starting with the 42nd volume of U.S. Reports, the Reporter of Decisions of the Supreme Court of the United States was Benjamin Chew Howard. Howard was Reporter of Decisions from 1843 to 1860, covering volumes 42 through 65 of United States Reports which correspond to volumes 1 through 24 of his Howard's Reports. As such, the dual form of citation to, for example, Philadelphia & Reading R.R. Co. v. Derby is 55 U.S. (14 How.) 468 (1853).

== Justices of the Supreme Court at the time of 55 U.S. (14 How.) ==
The Supreme Court is established by Article III, Section 1 of the Constitution of the United States, which says: "The judicial Power of the United States, shall be vested in one supreme Court . . .". The size of the Court is not specified; the Constitution leaves it to Congress to set the number of justices. Under the Judiciary Act of 1789 Congress originally fixed the number of justices at six (one chief justice and five associate justices). Since 1789 Congress has varied the size of the Court from six to seven, nine, ten, and back to nine justices (always including one chief justice).

Due to an unfilled vacancy, when the cases in 55 U.S. (14 How.) were decided the Court comprised only these eight members:

Portrait	Justice	Office	Home State	Succeeded	Date confirmed by the Senate (Vote)	Tenure on Supreme Court
	Roger B. Taney	Chief Justice	Maryland	John Marshall	March 15, 1836 (29–15)	March 28, 1836 – October 12, 1864 (Died)
	John McLean	Associate Justice	Ohio	Robert Trimble	March 7, 1829 (Acclamation)	January 11, 1830 – April 4, 1861 (Died)
	James Moore Wayne	Associate Justice	Georgia	William Johnson	January 9, 1835 (Acclamation)	January 14, 1835 – July 5, 1867 (Died)
	John Catron	Associate Justice	Tennessee	newly created seat	March 8, 1837 (28–15)	May 1, 1837 – May 30, 1865 (Died)
	Peter Vivian Daniel	Associate Justice	Virginia	Philip P. Barbour	March 2, 1841 (25–5)	January 10, 1842 – May 31, 1860 (Died)
	Samuel Nelson	Associate Justice	New York	Smith Thompson	February 14, 1845 (Acclamation)	February 27, 1845 – November 28, 1872 (Retired)
	Robert Cooper Grier	Associate Justice	Pennsylvania	Henry Baldwin	August 4, 1846 (Acclamation)	August 10, 1846 – January 31, 1870 (Retired)
	Benjamin Robbins Curtis	Associate Justice	Massachusetts	Levi Woodbury	December 20, 1851 (Acclamation)	October 10, 1851 – September 30, 1857 (Resigned)

== Notable cases in 55 U.S. (14 How.) ==
=== Le Roy v. Tatham ===
Le Roy v. Tatham, 55 U.S. (14 How.) 156 (1852), is a decision of the Supreme Court holding that an abstract principle can neither be patented nor claimed as an exclusive right.

=== Stephens v. Cady ===
In Stephens v. Cady, 55 U.S. (14 How.) 528 (1853), the Supreme Court held that a copyright is only notional property and has no corporeal tangible substance, so cannot be seized or sold in an execution sale.

== Citation style ==
Under the Judiciary Act of 1789 the federal court structure at the time comprised District Courts, which had general trial jurisdiction; Circuit Courts, which had mixed trial and appellate (from the US District Courts) jurisdiction; and the United States Supreme Court, which had appellate jurisdiction over the federal District and Circuit courts—and for certain issues over state courts. The Supreme Court also had limited original jurisdiction (i.e., in which cases could be filed directly with the Supreme Court without first having been heard by a lower federal or state court). There were one or more federal District Courts and/or Circuit Courts in each state, territory, or other geographical region.

Bluebook citation style is used for case names, citations, and jurisdictions.

- "C.C.D." = United States Circuit Court for the District of . . .
  - e.g.,"C.C.D.N.J." = United States Circuit Court for the District of New Jersey
- "D." = United States District Court for the District of . . .
  - e.g.,"D. Mass." = United States District Court for the District of Massachusetts
- "E." = Eastern; "M." = Middle; "N." = Northern; "S." = Southern; "W." = Western
  - e.g.,"C.C.S.D.N.Y." = United States Circuit Court for the Southern District of New York
  - e.g.,"M.D. Ala." = United States District Court for the Middle District of Alabama
- "Ct. Cl." = United States Court of Claims
- The abbreviation of a state's name alone indicates the highest appellate court in that state's judiciary at the time.
  - e.g.,"Pa." = Supreme Court of Pennsylvania
  - e.g.,"Me." = Supreme Judicial Court of Maine

== List of cases in 55 U.S. (14 How.) ==
Case Name	Page & year	Opinion of the Court	Concurring opinion(s)	Dissenting opinion(s)	Lower court	Disposition
Wylie v. Coxe	1 (1853)	Taney	none	none	C.C.D.C.	mandate denied
Ex parte Taylor	3 (1852)	per curiam	none	none	original	show cause denied
Moore v. Illinois	13 (1852)	Grier	none	McLean	Ill.	affirmed
Kanouse v. Martin	23 (1852)	Taney	none	none	N.Y. Super. Ct.	dismissal denied
Ex parte Many	24 (1853)	Taney	none	none	D. Mass.	mandamus denied
Brown v. Aspden's Adm'rs	25 (1853)	Taney	none	none	C.C.E.D. Pa.	reargument denied
Hagan v. Walker	29 (1852)	Curtis	none	none	C.C.S.D. Ala.	reversed
Kennett v. Chambers	38 (1852)	Taney	none	none	D. Tex.	affirmed
Wiswall v. Sampson	52 (1853)	Nelson	none	none	C.C.S.D. Ala.	reversed
Sample v. Barnes	70 (1852)	Daniel	none	none	C.C.S.D. Miss.	affirmed
Raymond's Lessee v. Longworth	76 (1852)	Catron	none	none	C.C.D. Ohio	affirmed
Herman v. Phalen	79 (1852)	Taney	none	none	C.C.E.D. La.	reversed
Rundle v. Delaware et al. Co.	80 (1853)	Grier	Catron	Daniel	C.C.D.N.J.	affirmed
In re Kaine	103 (1853)	none	Catron; Curtis	Nelson; Taney; Daniel	C.C.S.D.N.Y.	habeas corpus denied
Lawler v. Walker	149 (1852)	Wayne	none	none	Ohio	dismissed
Le Roy v. Tatham	156 (1853)	McLean	none	Nelson	C.C.S.D.N.Y.	reversed
United States v. Rillieux's Heirs	189 (1853)	Catron	none	none	E.D. La.	reversed
United States v. Gusman	193 (1853)	Catron	none	none	E.D. La.	reversed
Troy I. & N. Factory v. Corning	193 (1853)	Wayne	none	none	C.C.N.D.N.Y.	reversed
Silsby v. Foote	218 (1853)	Curtis	none	none	C.C.N.D.N.Y.	affirmed
E.P. Calkin & Co. v. Cocke	227 (1853)	Nelson	none	none	Tex.	reversed
Downey v. Hicks	240 (1853)	McLean	none	Daniel	C.C.S.D. Miss.	reversed
De Lane v. Moore	253 (1853)	Daniel	none	none	M.D. Ala.	affirmed
Vincennes Univ. v. Indiana	268 (1853)	McLean	none	Taney	Ind.	reversed
Christy v. Scott	282 (1853)	Curtis	none	none	D. Tex.	reversed
Christly v. Findley	296 (1852)	Curtis	none	none	D. Tex.	reversed
Christly v. Young	296 (1852)	Curtis	none	none	D. Tex.	reversed
Doss v. Tyack	297 (1853)	Grier	none	none	D. Tex.	affirmed
Christly v. Henley	297 (1853)	Curtis	none	none	D. Tex.	certification
Perkins v. Fourniquet I	313 (1853)	Wayne	none	none	C.C.S.D. Miss.	reversed
Perkins v. Fourniquet II	328 (1853)	Taney	none	none	C.C.S.D. Miss.	reversed
Harris v. Hardeman	334 (1853)	Daniel	none	none	C.C.S.D. Miss.	affirmed
Hoyt v. Hammekin	346 (1853)	McLean	none	none	D. Tex.	affirmed
General M. Ins. Co. v. Sherwood	351 (1853)	Curtis	none	none	C.C.S.D.N.Y.	reversed
Peale v. Phipps	368 (1853)	Taney	none	none	C.C.E.D. La.	reversed
Cunningham v. Ashley	377 (1853)	McLean	none	none	Ark.	reversed
Bosley v. Wyatt	390 (1853)	Taney	none	none	C.C.D. Md.	affirmed
Ennis v. Smith	400 (1853)	Wayne	none	none	C.C.D.C.	reversed
Winder v. Caldwell	434 (1853)	Grier	none	none	C.C.D.C.	reversed
Salmon Falls Mfg. Co. v. Goddard	446 (1853)	Nelson	none	Curtis	C.C.D. Mass.	reversed
Nutt v. Minor	464 (1853)	Catron	none	none	C.C.D.C.	reversed
Philadelphia & Reading R.R. Co. v. Derby	468 (1853)	Grier	none	Daniel	C.C.E.D. Pa.	affirmed
Webster v. Cooper	488 (1853)	Curtis	none	none	C.C.D. Me.	reversed
Sheppard v. Graves I	505 (1853)	Daniel	none	none	D. Tex.	affirmed
Sheppard v. Graves II	512 (1853)	Daniel	none	none	D. Tex.	affirmed
Marsh v. Brooks	513 (1853)	Catron	none	none	S.D. Iowa	affirmed
Jackson v. Hale	525 (1853)	Taney	none	none	D. Wis.	affirmed
Stephens v. Cady	528 (1853)	Nelson	none	none	C.C.D.R.I.	reversed
Stainback v. Rae	532 (1853)	Nelson	none	none	C.C.D. Mass.	reversed
Bloomer v. McQuewan	539 (1853)	Taney	none	none	C.C.W.D. Pa.	affirmed
Doolittle's Lessee v. Bryan	563 (1853)	Grier	none	none	C.C.D. Ohio	certification
Veazie v. Moor	568 (1853)	Daniel	none	none	Me.	affirmed
Boyden v. Burke	575 (1853)	Grier	none	none	C.C.D.C.	reversed
Walker v. Robbins	584 (1853)	Catron	none	none	C.C.S.D. Miss.	affirmed
Huff v. Hutchinson	586 (1853)	McLean	none	none	D. Wis.	affirmed
Goesele v. Bimeler	589 (1853)	McLean	none	none	C.C.D. Ohio	affirmed
Deacon v. Oliver	610 (1853)	Grier	none	none	C.C.D. Md.	affirmed

== See also ==
certificate of division
