= Court of Indian Offenses =

Indigenous court

A Court of Indian Offenses is an Article I Court operated by the U.S. Department of the Interior's Bureau of Indian Affairs. Also known as a "CFR" (Code of Federal Regulations) Court, a Court of Indian Offenses has criminal and civil jurisdiction over Native Americans in Indian Country, on reservations and other Indian trust land that lacks its own tribal court system. Criminally, the Court of Indian Offenses is a limited jurisdiction court that tries misdemeanor violations of Title 25 of the Code of Federal Regulations, as well as violations of tribal codes, with permission of the tribe. Civilly, the CFR court holds full civil jurisdiction over matters in its territory.

There are currently five CFR courts operating in the United States. These include:

1. The Albuquerque CFR Court, serving the Kewa Pueblo and the Santa Fe Indian School.
2. The Southern Plains CFR Court, serving the Apache Tribe of Oklahoma, the Caddo Nation of Oklahoma, the Fort Sill Apache Tribe of Oklahoma, the Kiowa Indian Tribe of Oklahoma, the Otoe-Missouria Tribe of Indians, and the Wichita and Affiliated Tribe of Indians.
3. The Western Region CFR Court, serving the Skull Valley Band of Goshutes Indians (Utah) and the Te-Moak Band of Western Shoshone Indians (Nevada).
4. The Eastern Oklahoma Region CFR Court, serving the Eastern Shawnee Tribe of Oklahoma, the Modoc Tribe of Oklahoma, the Ottawa Tribe of Oklahoma, the Peoria Tribe of Indians of Oklahoma; and the Seneca-Cayuga Tribe of Oklahoma.
5. The Southwest Region CFR court serves the Ute Mountain Ute Tribe of Colorado.

In addition to the various Courts of Indian Offenses, they also have appellate court divisions called the Court of Indian Appeals. Courts of Indian Appeals hear all appellate cases from cases originally heard in the CFR Courts within the below regions.

- Miami Agency: Seneca-Cayuga Nation, Shawnee Tribe of Oklahoma, Eastern Shawnee Tribe of Oklahoma, Peoria Tribe of Oklahoma, Ottawa Tribe of Oklahoma, Modoc Tribe of Oklahoma, and the Albuquerque/Santa Fe Indian School Region
- Western Region Agency: Skull Valley Band of Goshutes Indians of Utah, Te-Moak Tribe of Western Shoshone Indians of Nevada, and Winnemucca Indian Tribe
- Ute Agency: Ute Mountain Ute Tribe
- Albuquerque Agency
- Southern Plains Agency: Apache Tribe of Oklahoma, Caddo Nation of Oklahoma, Comanche Nation, Delaware Nation, Fort Sill Apache Tribe of Oklahoma, Kiowa Indian Tribe of Oklahoma, Otoe-Missouria Tribe of Indians, and Wichita and Affiliated Tribe of Indians

== Dual Sovereignty controversy ==
The CFR court is an Article I federal court, operating under the authority of the United States Secretary of the Interior. The CFR court only tries misdemeanor crimes, while the jurisdiction to try more serious felony crimes is vested with the United States Attorney’s Offices. However, U.S. Attorneys often decline to prosecute felony cases in Indian Country, which leads CFR court prosecutors to prosecute felony offenders using lesser included misdemeanor offenses in order to ensure that serious offenders receive at least some jail time.

This happened in the case of Denezpi v. United States, where the suspect, Merle Denezpi, an enrolled member of the Navajo Nation, raped a female enrolled member of the Navajo Nation on the reservation of the Ute Mountain Ute Tribe. The CFR prosecutor charged Denezpi with Aggravated Battery, a misdemeanor charge. Denezpi plead not guilty under an Alford plea, and was sentenced to time served. Unsatisfied with this result, the U.S. Attorney then indicted Denezpi for rape. Denezpi attempted to have the charge dismissed under double jeopardy rules because Aggravated Battery is a lesser included offense of the charge of rape. The government contended that double jeopardy did not exist because the CFR court was exercising tribal prosecutorial authority, not federal authority, in their prosecution of Denezpi. On February 22, 2022, the U.S. Supreme Court heard arguments to determine if CFR courts are tribal courts (as the government and the Ute Mountain Ute tribe contend), or if they are simply machinery to allow tribal courts to operate among tribes that lack the resources to operate their own courts. On June 13, 2022, the Court decided against Denezpi, stating that no matter what authority prosecutes the case, no matter whether CFR courts are tribal courts or federal courts, the source of the dual sovereignty doctrine is the plurality of the authorities where the offences originated from: since the Aggravated Battery charge was defined by the tribal authority and the rape charge was federal, they originated from two different sovereigns and therefore could be both prosecuted.
