= Backus v. Gould =

- Supreme Court of the United States

Decided March 18, 1849
- Full case name: Backus v. Gould
- Citations: 48 U.S. 798 (more) 7 How. 798; 12 L. Ed. 919

Holding
- The Copyright Act of 1831 requires courts to award damages from copyright infringement based on the number of copies found in the accused's possession, not the number of infringing copies that they ever printed.

Court membership
- Chief Justice Roger B. Taney Associate Justices John McLean · James M. Wayne; John Catron · John McKinley; Peter V. Daniel · Samuel Nelson; Levi Woodbury · Robert C. Grier

Case opinion
- Majority: McLean

Backus v. Gould, 48 U.S. (7 How.) 798 (1849), was a United States Supreme Court case in which the Court held the Copyright Act of 1831 requires courts to award damages from copyright infringement based on the number of copies found in the accused's possession, not the number of infringing copies that they ever printed. At the time, at least in the case of books, a "copy" was defined as a complete reprinting or transcription of the work.
