= Le Roy v. Tatham =

- Supreme Court of the United States

Argued December 16, 17, 20, 21, 1852 Decided January 10, 1853
- Full case name: Thomas Otis Le Roy and David Smith, Plaintiffs in Error v. Benjamin Tatham, Junior, George N. Tatham, and Henry B. Tatham
- Citations: 55 U.S. 156 (more) 14 How. 156; 14 L. Ed. 367; 1852 U.S. LEXIS 433

Court membership
- Chief Justice Roger B. Taney Associate Justices John McLean · James M. Wayne; John Catron · Peter V. Daniel; Samuel Nelson · Robert C. Grier; Benjamin R. Curtis

Case opinions
- Majority: McLean, joined by Taney, Catron, Daniel, Campbell
- Dissent: Nelson, joined by Wayne, Grier
- Curtis took no part in the consideration or decision of the case.

Le Roy v. Tatham, 55 U.S. (14 How.) 156 (1852), is a decision of the United States Supreme Court holding that "a newly discovered principle" cannot be patented, and no one can claim in it an exclusive right. This case is considered sometimes as the earliest example of patentable subject matter controversy in the US patent law. This controversy was finally rectified in the 2012 Mayo decision, that requires for a claim, comprising a "natural principle or a law of Nature" to have an additional "inventive concept", which limits the application of the principle to a particular use.

The inventors had discovered the principle that hot, but congealed, lead under pressure would re-unite as an unbroken solid material, which permitted manufacture of a superior lead pipe. The apparatus to make lead pipe was old and obvious: the inventors, by making slight changes in the old machinery to provide sufficient heat and pressure to remelt the lead, in effect, invented a new use of an old machine. The claim was to the old or obvious apparatus (as an apparatus) "when used to form pipes of metal under heat and pressure in the manner set forth or in any other manner substantially the same." It was not lawful to patent the old apparatus again, however used, so that the patent amounted to an attempt to patent the principle. That made the patent invalid.

== Background ==
John and Charles Hanson, of Huddersfield, England, made the alleged invention in 1837. Having been the first to discover that heating lead under pressure would eliminate discontinuities, such as a seam in cast lead pipe, and that this effect could be achieved by making and using the old, well-known machinery with slight adjustments, obtained a patent in which the specification stated that the inventors "do not claim any of the parts—the cylinder, core, die, or bridge, but that they claim the combination when used to form pipes of metal, under heat and pressure, in the way they have described." They assigned their rights to Tatham, who sued the defendants, Le Roy and Smith, in the Circuit Court for the Southern District of New York for patent infringement.

The judge charged the jury: "That the originality did not consist in the novelty of the machinery, but in bringing a newly discovered principle into practical application by which a useful article of manufacture is produced, and wrought pipe made, as distinguished from cast pipe." The jury rendered a verdict against the defendants for $11,394. The defendants then appealed to the Supreme Court.

== Ruling of the Supreme Court ==
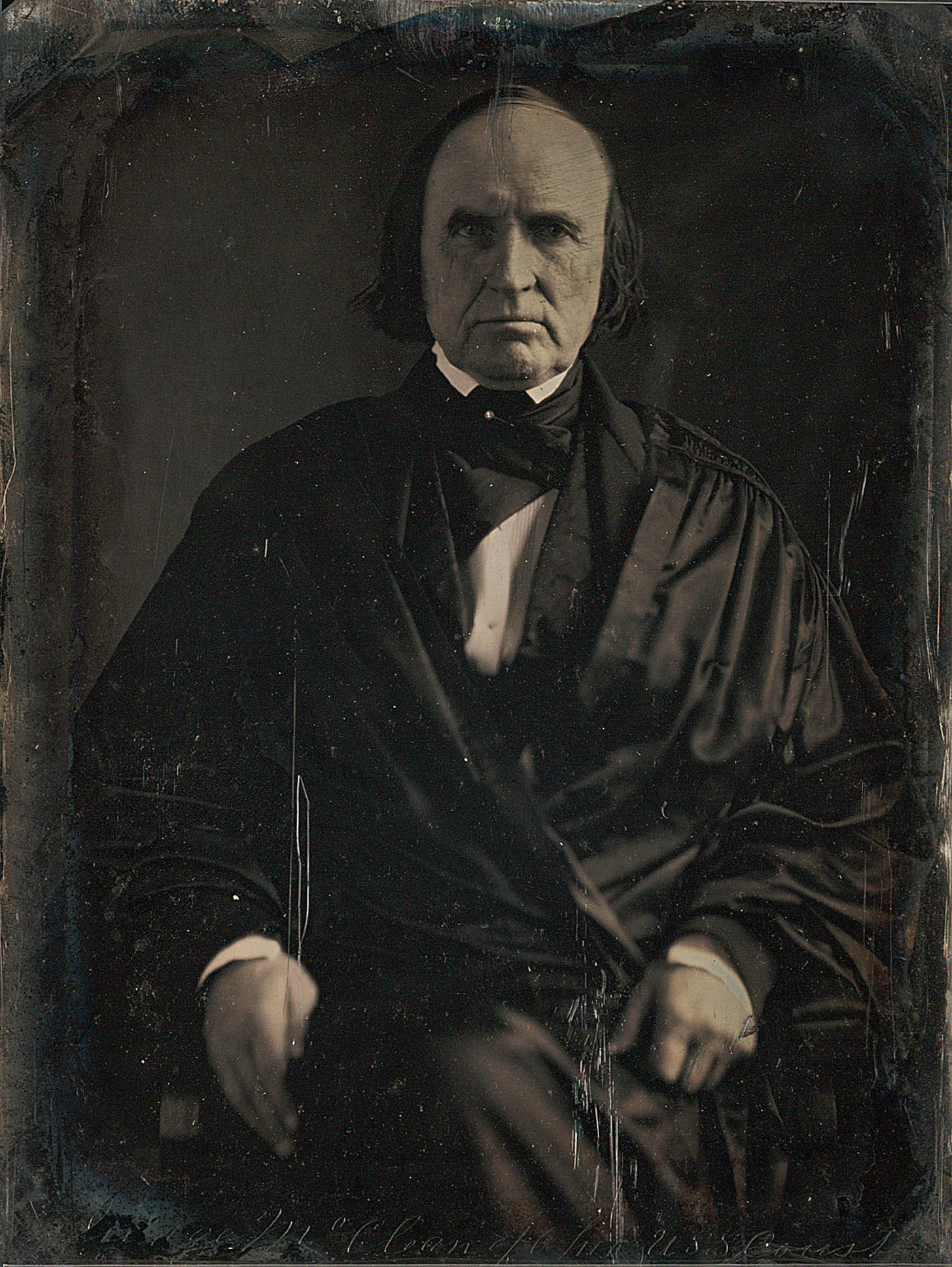
Justice John McLean 1849

Justice McLean delivered the opinion of the Court. Justice Nelson, joined by Justices Wayne and Grier, dissented.

=== Majority opinion ===
The Court emphasized the inventors' statement in the patent:

We do not claim as our invention and improvement, any of the parts of the above-described machinery independently of its arrangement and combination above set forth. What we do claim as our invention and desire to secure is the combination of the following parts above described, to-wit, the core and bridge or guide piece, with the cylinder, the piston, the chamber and the die, when used to form pipes of metal under heat and pressure in the manner set forth or in any other manner substantially the same."

The Court said that it was reversible error for the trial judge to charge the jury that "it was not material whether the mere [prior] combinations of machinery referred to were similar to the combination used by the Hansons, because the originality did not consist in the novelty of the machinery, but in bringing a newly discovered principle into practical application by which a useful article of manufacture is produced and wrought pipe made, as distinguished from cast pipe." Rather:

It is admitted that a principle is not patentable. A principle, in the abstract, is a fundamental truth; an original cause; a motive; these cannot be patented, as no one can claim in either of them an exclusive right. Nor can an exclusive right exist to a new power, should one be discovered in addition to those already known. Through the agency of machinery, a new steam power may be said to have been generated. But no one can appropriate this power exclusively to himself under the patent laws. The same may be said of electricity and of any other power in nature, which is alike open to all and may be applied to useful purposes by the use of machinery.

In all such cases, the processes used to extract, modify, and concentrate natural agencies constitute the invention. The elements of the power exist; the invention is not in discovering them, but in applying them to useful objects. Whether the machinery used be novel or consist of a new combination of parts known, the right of the inventor is secured against all who use the same mechanical power or one that shall be substantially the same.

Contrary to the charge to the jury, whether the apparatus is novel does make a difference. Here, the inventors conceded that the apparatus was old and they did "not claim as our invention and improvement any of the parts of the above described machinery"; they claimed the old machinery "when used to form pipes of metal, under heat and pressure."

The Court quoted Justice Story, sitting on circuit, in Bean v. Smallwood, for the proposition that "Now I take it to be clear that a machine or apparatus or other mechanical contrivance, in order to give the party a claim to a patent therefor, must in itself be substantially new. If it is old and well known, and applied only to a new purpose, that does not make it patentable." The instruction was wrong, so the judgment had to be reversed.

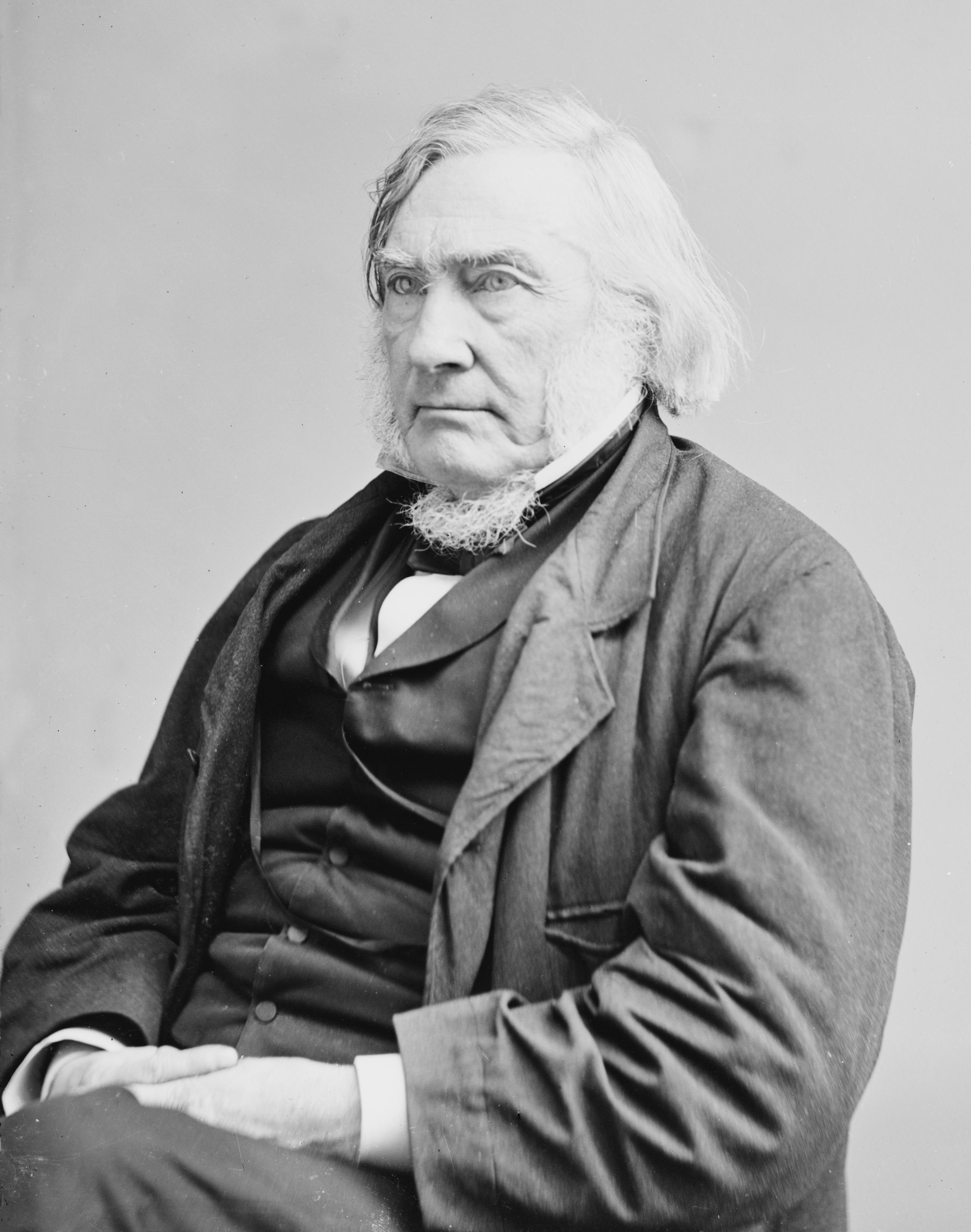
Justice Nelson

=== Dissent ===
Justice Samuel Nelson argued that the principle was what the inventors contributed and the particular apparatus used was trivial and unimportant:

[W]e see that the leading feature of the invention consists in the discovery of a new property in the article of lead and in the employment and adaptation of it, by means of the machinery described, to the production of a new article, wrought pipe, never before successfully made. Without the discovery of this new property in the metal, the machinery or apparatus would be useless, and not the subject of a patent. It is in connection with this property and the embodiment and adaptation of it to practical use that the machinery is described and the arrangement claimed. The discovery of this new element or property led naturally to the apparatus by which a new and most useful result is produced. The apparatus was but incidental and subsidiary to the new and leading idea of the invention. And hence the patentees set forth as the leading feature of it, the discovery that lead in a solid state, but under heat and extreme pressure in a close vessel, will reunite after separation of its parts as completely as though it had never been separated. It required very little ingenuity, after the experiments in a close vessel, by which this new property of the metal was first developed, to construct the necessary machinery for the formation of the pipe. The apparatus essential to develop this property would at once suggest the material parts, especially in the state of the art at the time. Any skillful mechanic, with [the prior art] before him, would readily construct the requisite machinery.

Nelson argued that the Court ought to "construe specifications benignly, and to look through mere forms of expression, often inartificially used, to the substance, and to maintain the right of the patentee to the thing really invented, if ascertainable upon a liberal consideration of the language of the specification." These inventors did not suppose that their invention was the arrangement of machinery. "They state distinctly that the leading feature of their discovery consisted of this new property of lead and some of its alloys -- this, they say, is the remarkable feature of their invention -- and the apparatus described is regarded by them as subordinate, and as important only as enabling them to give practical effect to this newly discovered property, by means of which they produce the new manufacture [seamless lead pipe]."

In Nelson's view:

[W]here a person discovers a principle or property of nature, or where he conceives of a new application of a well known principle or property of nature and also of some mode of carrying it out into practice so as to produce or attain a new and useful effect or result, he is entitled to protection against all other modes of carrying the same principle or property into practice for obtaining the same effect or result.

He argued further that if someone discovers a "law of nature or property of matter and applied it" to produce a beneficial new result, "he is entitled to be protected against all modes by which the same result is produced by an application of the same law of nature or property of matter."
