= Maygene Daniels =

American art historian

- Born: March 31, 1948 (age 78)
- Education: Carleton College (BA); Yale University (MA)
- Occupation: Art historian
- Spouse: Stephen M. Daniels (m. 1972)
- Children: Leah

Maygene Frost Daniels (born March 31, 1948) is an American art historian who was President of the Society of American Archivists. She was the chief archivist at the National Gallery of Art in Washington and has written books on being an archivist and art history.

== Early life and education ==
Maygene Daniels attended Carleton College in Minnesota and graduated in 1970 with a major in Art History. She attended Yale University for a Master's in Art History.

== Career ==
Daniels began her career as an archivist with the National Archives and advocated for the preservation of building permits of historic Washington, DC buildings.

When she left the National Archives, Daniels began serving at the National Gallery of Art and founded their archives. Among many of her projects and exhibits she has curated is a project on the art of Monuments Men. Daniels has done several interviews with the National Gallery of Art for many of their podcast episodes.

Daniels worked at the National Gallery of Art in Washington, DC for over 30 years and is the founder of the Gallery's archives. She served as Chief of Gallery Archives, Archives Technician, and Head Archivist. She has spoken and lectured at many conferences and institutions and has served with the Library of Congress and the National Archives and Records Administration.

Daniels served as a member of the Society of American Archivists Council from 1987-1990. She later served as vice president from 1993-1994 and served as the Society's 50th President from 1994-1995.

In 2016, she took over for John Franzen in leading the Ruth Ann Overbeck History Lecture Series, part of the Capitol Hill History Project. She has been the senior adviser for the project's archival issues and was central in researching the Old Naval Hospital and creating the biographical plaques there and elsewhere. Daniels is currently serving on the board and is a co-organizer of the Overbeck Lecture Series.

== Personal life ==
She has been a community activist member of the Capitol Hill Restoration Society. In 2014, Maygene, her husband Steve, and their daughter Leah were honored by the Capitol Hill Community foundation for their contributions to the community.

She and her husband, Steve, are fundraisers for the Folger Shakespeare Library in Washington, DC.

== Publications ==
Daniels has authored books and articles over the course of her career, including many guides published through the National Archives, the National Gallery of Art, and the Academy of Certified Archivists. In 1984, she co-wrote the archival handbook, A Modern Archives Reader: Basic Readings on Archival Theory and Practice, co-authored with Timothy Walch. The book is often listed among many others to provide guidance and instruction for archivists. Other writings include:

- National Gallery of Art Architecture & Design with Susan Wertheim (2014)
- Designed for America : the National Gallery of Art (2014)
- The Chester Dale Collection with Kimberley Jones (2010)
- "The East Building: A History in Documents," Studies in the History of Art (Washington, D.C.) (2009)
- A Guide to the Archival Care of Architectural Records 19th-20th Centuries (2000)
- "Developing New Museum Archives," Curator (1999)
- "On Being an Archivist," The American Archivist (1996)
- "The Ingenious Pen: American Writing Implements from the Eighteenth Century to the Twentieth," The American Archivist (1980)
- Federal Register Published Documents in the National Archives: Special Study (1974)
