= Stevens v. Gladding =

- Supreme Court of the United States

Decided December 1, 1854
- Full case name: James Stevens v. Royal Gladding and Isaac T. Proud
- Citations: 58 U.S. 447 (more) 17 How. 447; 15 L. Ed. 155

Holding
- The copyright of a work is not attached to the physical copperplate used to print the work, so purchasing the copperplate does not purchase the copyright.

Court membership
- Chief Justice Roger B. Taney Associate Justices John McLean · James M. Wayne; John Catron · Peter V. Daniel; Samuel Nelson · Robert C. Grier; Benjamin R. Curtis · John A. Campbell

Laws applied
- Supplemental Copyright Act of 1819, Copyright Act of 1831

Stevens v. Gladding, 58 U.S. 447 (1854), was a United States Supreme Court case in which the Court held the copyright of a work is not attached to the physical copperplate used to print the work, so purchasing the copperplate does not purchase the copyright.

It also applied a principle from English law that courts of equity could not award penalties and concluded that copyright infringement damages categorically could not be awarded by equity, as distinguished from legal actions under common law. This meant that copyright holders would be required to file separate lawsuits for injunctions against the continued printing of works created by them (equity) and for requesting retroactive payment from infringers (law). That procedural requirement remained in place until the federal courts merged the law and equity dockets in 1938.

This case is closely related to Stephens v. Cady.
