= The Canoe and the Saddle =

Novel by Theodore Winthrop

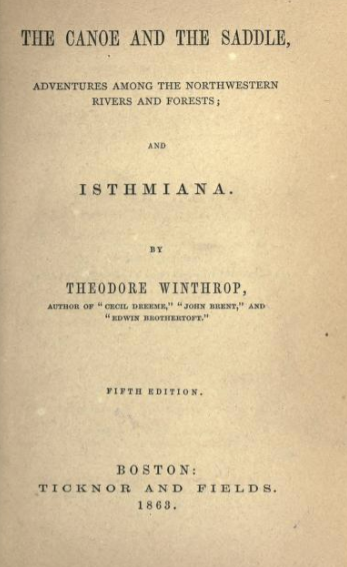
- Title page for The Canoe and the Saddle (1863)
- Author: Theodore Winthrop
- Genre: Memoir
- Publication date: 1862

The Canoe and the Saddle (1862) is a novelized adventure memoir by the American author Theodore Winthrop (1828–1861). It vividly describes Washington state’s landscape and natural resources as well as the tumultuous relationship between Winthrop and the Native American people he interacted with.

The Canoe and the Saddle presents a picturesque image of the Pacific Northwest and later inspired travelers, activists, and artists. Conflicting themes of nature and evolving civilization are at odds with each other in this novel with Winthrop's belief that “preservation of the civilized world resided within its wildness-but only if that wildness could be kept at arm’s length.” (Lindholdt 11).

Winthrop's literary depiction of the Northwest, particularly Washington Territory, earned him great popularity. The town of Winthrop, Washington took on his name in 1890 as well as Mount Rainier’s Winthrop Glacier due to his detailed descriptions of the landscape in his book. The Winthrop Hotel in Tacoma, Washington, was also named in his honor.
