= List of United States Supreme Court cases, volume 59 =

Supreme Court of the United States
- Interactive map of Supreme Court of the United States
- 38°53′26″N 77°00′16″W
- Established: March 4, 1789; 236 years ago
- Location: Washington, D.C.
- Coordinates: 38°53′26″N 77°00′16″W
- Composition method: Presidential nomination with Senate confirmation
- Authorised by: Constitution of the United States, Art. III, § 1
- Judge term length: life tenure, subject to impeachment and removal
- Number of positions: 9 (by statute)
- Website: supremecourt.gov

This is a list of cases reported in volume 59 (18 How.) of United States Reports, decided by the Supreme Court of the United States in 1855 and 1856.

== Nominative reports ==
In 1874, the U.S. government created the United States Reports, and retroactively numbered older privately published case reports as part of the new series. As a result, cases appearing in volumes 1–90 of U.S. Reports have dual citation forms; one for the volume number of U.S. Reports, and one for the volume number of the reports named for the relevant reporter of decisions (these are called "nominative reports").

=== Benjamin Chew Howard ===
Starting with the 42nd volume of U.S. Reports, the Reporter of Decisions of the Supreme Court of the United States was Benjamin Chew Howard. Howard was Reporter of Decisions from 1843 to 1860, covering volumes 42 through 65 of United States Reports which correspond to volumes 1 through 24 of his Howard's Reports. As such, the dual form of citation to, for example, The Steamboat New York is 59 U.S. (18 How.) 223 (1856).

== Justices of the Supreme Court at the time of 59 U.S. (18 How.) ==
The Supreme Court is established by Article III, Section 1 of the Constitution of the United States, which says: "The judicial Power of the United States, shall be vested in one supreme Court . . .". The size of the Court is not specified; the Constitution leaves it to Congress to set the number of justices. Under the Judiciary Act of 1789 Congress originally fixed the number of justices at six (one chief justice and five associate justices). Since 1789 Congress has varied the size of the Court from six to seven, nine, ten, and back to nine justices (always including one chief justice).

When the cases in 59 U.S. (18 How.) were decided the Court comprised these nine members:

Portrait	Justice	Office	Home State	Succeeded	Date confirmed by the Senate (Vote)	Tenure on Supreme Court
	Roger B. Taney	Chief Justice	Maryland	John Marshall	March 15, 1836 (29–15)	March 28, 1836 – October 12, 1864 (Died)
	John McLean	Associate Justice	Ohio	Robert Trimble	March 7, 1829 (Acclamation)	January 11, 1830 – April 4, 1861 (Died)
	James Moore Wayne	Associate Justice	Georgia	William Johnson	January 9, 1835 (Acclamation)	January 14, 1835 – July 5, 1867 (Died)
	John Catron	Associate Justice	Tennessee	newly created seat	March 8, 1837 (28–15)	May 1, 1837 – May 30, 1865 (Died)
	Peter Vivian Daniel	Associate Justice	Virginia	Philip P. Barbour	March 2, 1841 (25–5)	January 10, 1842 – May 31, 1860 (Died)
	Samuel Nelson	Associate Justice	New York	Smith Thompson	February 14, 1845 (Acclamation)	February 27, 1845 – November 28, 1872 (Retired)
	Robert Cooper Grier	Associate Justice	Pennsylvania	Henry Baldwin	August 4, 1846 (Acclamation)	August 10, 1846 – January 31, 1870 (Retired)
	Benjamin Robbins Curtis	Associate Justice	Massachusetts	Levi Woodbury	December 20, 1851 (Acclamation)	October 10, 1851 – September 30, 1857 (Resigned)
	John Archibald Campbell	Associate Justice	Alabama	John McKinley	March 22, 1853 (Acclamation)	April 11, 1853 – April 30, 1861 (Resigned)

== Citation style ==
Under the Judiciary Act of 1789 the federal court structure at the time comprised District Courts, which had general trial jurisdiction; Circuit Courts, which had mixed trial and appellate (from the US District Courts) jurisdiction; and the United States Supreme Court, which had appellate jurisdiction over the federal District and Circuit courts—and for certain issues over state courts. The Supreme Court also had limited original jurisdiction (i.e., in which cases could be filed directly with the Supreme Court without first having been heard by a lower federal or state court). There were one or more federal District Courts and/or Circuit Courts in each state, territory, or other geographical region.

Bluebook citation style is used for case names, citations, and jurisdictions.

- "C.C.D." = United States Circuit Court for the District of . . .
  - e.g.,"C.C.D.N.J." = United States Circuit Court for the District of New Jersey
- "D." = United States District Court for the District of . . .
  - e.g.,"D. Mass." = United States District Court for the District of Massachusetts
- "E." = Eastern; "M." = Middle; "N." = Northern; "S." = Southern; "W." = Western
  - e.g.,"C.C.S.D.N.Y." = United States Circuit Court for the Southern District of New York
  - e.g.,"M.D. Ala." = United States District Court for the Middle District of Alabama
- "Ct. Cl." = United States Court of Claims
- The abbreviation of a state's name alone indicates the highest appellate court in that state's judiciary at the time.
  - e.g.,"Pa." = Supreme Court of Pennsylvania
  - e.g.,"Me." = Supreme Judicial Court of Maine

== List of cases in 59 U.S. (18 How.) ==
Case Name	Page and year	Opinion of the Court	Concurring opinion(s)	Dissenting opinion(s)	Lower court	Disposition of case
United States v. Reading	1 (1856)	Wayne	Catron	Daniel	N.D. Cal.	affirmed
McLean v. Meek	16 (1856)	Catron	none	none	C.C.S.D. Miss.	affirmed
Kissell v. St. Louis Public Schools	19 (1856)	Catron	none	none	Mo.	affirmed
Hartshorn v. Day	28 (1856)	McLean	none	none	C.C.D.R.I.	dismissed
United States v. Fremont	30 (1856)	McLean	Catron	none	N.D. Cal.	dismissed
Ex parte Sturgess	40 (1855)	McLean	none	none	C.C.E.D. La.	filing extension denied
Peck v. Sanderson	42 (1855)	McLean	none	none	C.C.E.D. Pa.	rehearing denied
Barnard v. Ashley	43 (1856)	Catron	none	none	C.C.S.D.N.Y.	affirmed
Wright v. Mattison	50 (1856)	Daniel	none	none	C.C.D. Ill.	reversed
Graham v. Bayne	60 (1855)	Grier	none	none	C.C.D. Ill.	reversed
The Brig Ann C. Pratt	63 (1855)	Nelson	none	none	C.C.D. Me.	affirmed
Holroyd v. Pumphrey	69 (1855)	Campbell	none	none	C.C.D.C.	reversed
Smith v. Maryland	71 (1855)	Curtis	none	none	Md. Cir. Ct.	affirmed
Jones v. League	76 (1855)	McLean	none	none	D. Tex.	reversed
Bush v. Person	82 (1856)	Curtis	none	none	Miss.	affirmed
Verden v. Coleman	86 (1855)	Campbell	none	none	Ind.	dismissed
Minter v. Crommelin	87 (1856)	Catron	none	none	Ala.	reversed
McCready v. Goldsmith	89 (1856)	Nelson	none	none	C.C.S.D.N.Y.	affirmed
United States v. Gatesby	92 (1856)	Grier	none	Daniel	C.C.D.C.	affirmed
United States ex rel. Mackey v. Coxe	100 (1856)	McLean	Nelson; Curtis	none	C.C.D.C.	affirmed
Sessions v. Pintard	106 (1856)	McLean	none	none	C.C.E.D. Ark.	affirmed
Curtis v. Petitpain	109 (1856)	Campbell	none	none	C.C.E.D. La.	dismissed
J. Torre and Company v. Montgomery	110 (1856)	Daniel	none	none	C.C.D.C.	affirmed
Ham v. Missouri	126 (1856)	Daniel	Nelson	none	Mo.	affirmed
Guild v. Frontin	135 (1856)	Grier	none	none	N.D. Cal.	affirmed
Savignac v. Garrison	136 (1856)	Nelson	none	none	C.C.D. Mo.	reversed
Parker v. Overman	137 (1856)	Grier	none	none	C.C.D. Ark.	deed annulled
Richards v. Holmes	143 (1856)	Curtis	none	none	C.C.D.C.	affirmed
Jones v. Johnston	150 (1856)	Nelson	none	none	C.C.D. Ill.	reversed
Griffith v. Bogert	158 (1856)	Grier	none	none	C.C.D. Mo.	affirmed
Little v. Hall	165 (1856)	McLean	none	none	C.C.N.D.N.Y.	affirmed
Cooper v. Roberts	173 (1856)	Campbell	none	none	C.C.D. Mich.	reversed
The Schooner Freeman	182 (1856)	Curtis	none	none	C.C.N.D.N.Y.	reversed
De la Lande's Heirs v. Louisiana	192 (1856)	McLean	none	none	La.	dismissed
Lafayette's Heirs v. Kenton	197 (1856)	Catron	none	none	C.C.E.D. La.	affirmed
Craighead v. Wilson	199 (1856)	McLean	none	none	C.C.E.D. La.	dismissed
Abbott v. Essex Company	202 (1856)	Grier	none	none	C.C.D. Mass.	affirmed
McLaughlin v. Swann	217 (1856)	Curtis	none	none	C.C.D. Md.	reversed
The Steamboat New York	223 (1856)	Nelson	none	Daniel	C.C.S.D.N.Y.	affirmed
The Ship Howard	231 (1856)	Catron	Daniel	none	C.C.S.D.N.Y.	reversed
McKinney v. Saviego	235 (1856)	Campbell	none	none	D. Tex.	reversed
United States v. The Minnesota and Northwestern Railroad Company	241 (1856)	Nelson	none	none	Sup. Ct. Terr. Minn.	discontinued
Calcote v. Stanton	243 (1856)	Grier	none	none	Miss.	dismissed
The York and Cumberland Railroad Company v. Myers	246 (1856)	Campbell	none	none	C.C.D. Me.	affirmed
Shields v. Thomas	253 (1856)	Daniel	none	none	N.D. Iowa	affirmed
Orton v. Smith	263 (1856)	Grier	none	none	D. Wis.	reversed
Ward v. Peck	267 (1856)	Grier	none	Daniel	C.C.E.D. La.	affirmed
Murray's Lessee v. Hoboken Land and Improvement Company	272 (1856)	Curtis	none	none	C.C.D.N.J	certification
Nutt v. Minor	286 (1856)	Catron	none	none	C.C.D.C.	affirmed
Kinsman v. Parkhurst	289 (1856)	Curtis	none	none	C.C.S.D.N.Y.	affirmed
Ransom v. Winn	295 (1856)	McLean	none	none	C.C.D.C.	dismissed
McCall's Lessee v. Carpenter	297 (1856)	Nelson	none	Campbell	C.C.D. Ind.	reversed
Ex parte Wells	307 (1856)	Wayne	none	McLean; Curtis	C.C.D.C.	affirmed
Dodge v. Woolsey	331 (1856)	Wayne	none	Campbell	C.C.D. Ohio	affirmed
State Bank v. Debolt	380 (1856)	Wayne	none	none	Ohio	reversed
State Bank v. Thomas	384 (1856)	Wayne	none	none	Ohio	reversed
Wilkins v. Allen	385 (1856)	Catron	none	none	C.C.W.D. Pa.	affirmed
Connor v. Peugh's Lessee	394 (1856)	Grier	none	none	C.C.D.C.	dismissed
South v. Maryland	396 (1856)	Grier	none	none	C.C.D. Md.	reversed
Lafayette Insurance Company v. French	404 (1856)	Curtis	none	none	C.C.D. Ind.	affirmed
Stanford v. Taylor	409 (1856)	Catron	none	none	C.C.D. Mo.	reversed
Converse v. Burgess	413 (1856)	Campbell	none	Taney	C.C.D. Mass.	affirmed
Stockton v. Ford	418 (1856)	Nelson	none	none	C.C.E.D. La.	affirmed
Pennsylvania v. Wheeling and Belmont Bridge Company I	421 (1856)	Nelson	Daniel; Grier; Wayne	McLean; Grier; Wayne	original	injunction dissolved
Pennsylvania v. Wheeling and Belmont Bridge Company II	460 (1856)	Nelson	none	none	original	review of costs denied
Goslee v. Shute	463 (1856)	McLean	none	none	C.C.E.D. La.	affirmed
Wood v. Davis	467 (1856)	Nelson	none	none	C.C.N.D. Ill.	reversed
Fouvergne v. City of New Orleans	470 (1856)	Campbell	none	none	C.C.E.D. La.	affirmed
Ledoux v. Black	473 (1856)	Catron	none	none	La.	affirmed
In re United States v. Booth I	476 (1856)	Taney	none	none	Wis.	continued
In re United States v. Booth II	477 (1856)	Taney	none	none	Wis.	show cause ordered
Ableman v. Booth	479 (1856)	Taney	none	none	Wis.	continued
Bacon v. Robertson	480 (1856)	Campbell	none	none	C.C.S.D. Miss.	reversed
Masters v. Barreda	489 (1856)	Wayne	none	none	C.C.E.D. Va.	affirmed
Beauregard v. City of New Orleans	497 (1856)	Campbell	none	none	C.C.E.D. La.	affirmed
Union Bank v. Vaiden	503 (1856)	Wayne	none	none	N.D. Miss.	reversed
McMicken v. Perin	507 (1856)	Campbell	none	none	C.C.E.D. La.	affirmed
Maxwell v. Newbold	511 (1856)	Taney	none	none	Mich.	dismissed
Watson v. Tarpley	517 (1856)	Daniel	none	none	C.C.S.D. Miss.	reversed
Stairs v. Peaslee	521 (1856)	Taney	none	none	C.C.D. Mass.	certification
Hudgins v. Kemp	530 (1856)	Taney	none	none	C.C.E.D. Va.	dismissal denied
The de Arguello	539 (1856)	Grier	none	Daniel	N.D. Cal.	affirmed
United States v. Cervantes	553 (1856)	Grier	none	none	N.D. Cal.	affirmed
United States v. Vaca	556 (1856)	Grier	none	none	N.D. Cal.	affirmed
United States v. Larkin	557 (1856)	Nelson	none	Campbell	N.D. Cal.	affirmed
Dennistoun v. Stewart	565 (1856)	Daniel	none	none	C.C.S.D. Ala.	certification
The Steamer Oregon	570 (1856)	McLean	none	Daniel	C.C.S.D. Ala.	affirmed
Ogilvie v. Knox Insurance Company	577 (1856)	Daniel	none	none	C.C.D. Ind.	certification
The Steamboat Isaac Newton	581 (1856)	Curtis	none	none	C.C.S.D.N.Y.	reversed
The Steamer Southern Belle	584 (1856)	McLean	none	none	C.C.E.D. La.	reversed
United States v. Shackleford	588 (1856)	Nelson	none	none	C.C.D. Ky.	certification
Conner v. Elliott	591 (1856)	Curtis	none	none	La.	affirmed
Pease v. Peck	595 (1856)	Grier	none	Campbell	C.C.D. Mich.	affirmed
Strader v. Graham	602 (1856)	per curiam	none	none	original	costs denied

== See also ==
certificate of division
