= Stephens v. Cady =

- Supreme Court of the United States

Decided February 23, 1853
- Full case name: Stephens v. Cady
- Citations: 55 U.S. 528 (more) 14 How. 528; 14 L. Ed. 528

Holding
- A copyright is a property in notion, and has no corporeal tangible substance, so it cannot be seized or sold in an execution sale.

Court membership
- Chief Justice Roger B. Taney Associate Justices John McLean · James M. Wayne; John Catron · Peter V. Daniel; Samuel Nelson · Robert C. Grier; Benjamin R. Curtis

Case opinion
- Majority: Nelson, joined by a unanimous court

Stephens v. Cady, 55 U.S. 528 (1853), was a United States Supreme Court case in which the Court held a copyright is a property in notion, and has no corporeal tangible substance, so it cannot be seized or sold in an execution sale.

This case is closely related to Stevens v. Gladding.
