= William Winthrop =

United States Army colonel and legal scholar

Acting Judge Advocate General of the United States Army
- In office January 22, 1881 – February 18, 1881
- President: Rutherford B. Hayes
- Preceded by: William McKee Dunn
- Succeeded by: David Gaskill Swaim

Personal details
- Born: August 3, 1831 New Haven, Connecticut, U.S.
- Died: April 8, 1899 (aged 67) Atlantic City, New Jersey, U.S.
- Spouse: Alice Worthington Winthrop
- Parent: Elizabeth Dwight (Woolsey) Winthrop
- Relatives: John Winthrop (ancestor); Robert Charles Winthrop (uncle); Theodore Dwight Woolsey (uncle); Theodore Winthrop (brother)
- Education: Yale University (A.B.); Yale Law School (LL.B.)

Military service
- Allegiance: United States of America; Union
- Branch/service: United States Army; Union Army
- Years of service: 1861–1895
- Rank: Colonel
- Unit: 7th New York Militia; 1st United States Sharpshooters
- Commands: Judge Advocate General of the Army
- Battles/wars: American Civil War

William Woolsey Winthrop (1831–1899) was acting Judge Advocate General of the United States Army from January 22, 1881, to February 18, 1881. A legal scholar, he was the author of a number of works on military law, including the influential Military Law and Precedents. The United States Supreme Court has described him as "the Blackstone of military law.". According to his biographer, Winthrop descended from John Winthrop and was related to Theodore Dwight Woolsey as well as Speaker of the House Robert Charles Winthrop.

Winthrop graduated from Yale University and Yale Law School then spent another year studying at Harvard Law School. After law school he travelled to the Minnesota Territory where he set up a law practice but became involved in drafting the first constitution for its statehood. Winthrop was staunchly anti-slavery and he placed into the constitution the right to universal make suffrage.

When the Civil War broke out, he and his brother Theodore Winthrop, joined the New York Seventh Regiment, and after ninety days of service, he was commissioned as a lieutenant in the First United States Sharpshooters. After being shot in the lung during the American Civil War, he spent the rest of his career as a judge advocate general until 1895.

The robustness of Winthrop's scholarship has been challenged, as has the reliance on his work by judges to make ahistorical claims bolstering their decisions. In particular, Winthrop's scholarship aggressively argued for the expansion of executive power over the military, presenting his ideas as the law without citation, and his ideas were then picked up by jurists who believed themselves to be following precedent. For example, after Winthrop cited the United States Supreme Court case Dynes v. Hoover near his assertion that the court martial system was an "instrumentality" that the president could use liberally to discipline military personnel, judges began to summarily cite that case for that proposition despite the fact that it had nothing to do with that. Over time, this position even came to be called the "traditional view."

== Sources ==
- William F. Fratcher (1944). "Colonel William Winthrop: A Biographical Sketch". Judge Advocate Journal.
- George S. Prugh Jr. (1956). "Colonel William Winthrop: The Tradition of the Military Lawyer". American Bar Association Journal.
- Joshua E. Kastenberg, The Blackstone of Military Law: Colonel William Winthrop (Lanham, MD: Scarecrow Press, 2009)
