= List of United States Supreme Court cases, volume 61 =

Supreme Court of the United States
- Interactive map of Supreme Court of the United States
- 38°53′26″N 77°00′16″W
- Established: March 4, 1789; 236 years ago
- Location: Washington, D.C.
- Coordinates: 38°53′26″N 77°00′16″W
- Composition method: Presidential nomination with Senate confirmation
- Authorised by: Constitution of the United States, Art. III, § 1
- Judge term length: life tenure, subject to impeachment and removal
- Number of positions: 9 (by statute)
- Website: supremecourt.gov

This is a list of cases reported in volume 61 (20 How.) of United States Reports, decided by the Supreme Court of the United States in 1857 and 1858.

== Nominative reports ==
In 1874, the U.S. government created the United States Reports, and retroactively numbered older privately published case reports as part of the new series. As a result, cases appearing in volumes 1–90 of U.S. Reports have dual citation forms; one for the volume number of U.S. Reports, and one for the volume number of the reports named for the relevant reporter of decisions (these are called "nominative reports").

=== Benjamin Chew Howard ===
Starting with the 42nd volume of U.S. Reports, the Reporter of Decisions of the Supreme Court of the United States was Benjamin Chew Howard. Howard was Reporter of Decisions from 1843 to 1860, covering volumes 42 through 65 of United States Reports which correspond to volumes 1 through 24 of his Howard's Reports. As such, the dual form of citation to, for example, Smith v. City of Washington is 61 U.S. (20 How.) 135 (1858).

== Justices of the Supreme Court at the time of 61 U.S. (20 How.) ==
The Supreme Court is established by Article III, Section 1 of the Constitution of the United States, which says: "The judicial Power of the United States, shall be vested in one supreme Court . . .". The size of the Court is not specified; the Constitution leaves it to Congress to set the number of justices. Under the Judiciary Act of 1789 Congress originally fixed the number of justices at six (one chief justice and five associate justices). Since 1789 Congress has varied the size of the Court from six to seven, nine, ten, and back to nine justices (always including one chief justice).

When the cases in 61 U.S. (20 How.) were decided the Court comprised these nine members:

Portrait	Justice	Office	Home State	Succeeded	Date confirmed by the Senate (Vote)	Tenure on Supreme Court
	Roger B. Taney	Chief Justice	Maryland	John Marshall	March 15, 1836 (29–15)	March 28, 1836 – October 12, 1864 (Died)
	John McLean	Associate Justice	Ohio	Robert Trimble	March 7, 1829 (Acclamation)	January 11, 1830 – April 4, 1861 (Died)
	James Moore Wayne	Associate Justice	Georgia	William Johnson	January 9, 1835 (Acclamation)	January 14, 1835 – July 5, 1867 (Died)
	John Catron	Associate Justice	Tennessee	newly created seat	March 8, 1837 (28–15)	May 1, 1837 – May 30, 1865 (Died)
	Peter Vivian Daniel	Associate Justice	Virginia	Philip P. Barbour	March 2, 1841 (25–5)	January 10, 1842 – May 31, 1860 (Died)
	Samuel Nelson	Associate Justice	New York	Smith Thompson	February 14, 1845 (Acclamation)	February 27, 1845 – November 28, 1872 (Retired)
	Robert Cooper Grier	Associate Justice	Pennsylvania	Henry Baldwin	August 4, 1846 (Acclamation)	August 10, 1846 – January 31, 1870 (Retired)
	John Archibald Campbell	Associate Justice	Alabama	John McKinley	March 22, 1853 (Acclamation)	April 11, 1853 – April 30, 1861 (Resigned)
	Nathan Clifford	Associate Justice	Maine	Benjamin Robbins Curtis	January 12, 1858 (26–23)	January 21, 1858 – July 25, 1881 (Died)

== Citation style ==
Under the Judiciary Act of 1789 the federal court structure at the time comprised District Courts, which had general trial jurisdiction; Circuit Courts, which had mixed trial and appellate (from the US District Courts) jurisdiction; and the United States Supreme Court, which had appellate jurisdiction over the federal District and Circuit courts—and for certain issues over state courts. The Supreme Court also had limited original jurisdiction (i.e., in which cases could be filed directly with the Supreme Court without first having been heard by a lower federal or state court). There were one or more federal District Courts and/or Circuit Courts in each state, territory, or other geographical region.

Bluebook citation style is used for case names, citations, and jurisdictions.

- "C.C.D." = United States Circuit Court for the District of . . .
  - e.g.,"C.C.D.N.J." = United States Circuit Court for the District of New Jersey
- "D." = United States District Court for the District of . . .
  - e.g.,"D. Mass." = United States District Court for the District of Massachusetts
- "E." = Eastern; "M." = Middle; "N." = Northern; "S." = Southern; "W." = Western
  - e.g.,"C.C.S.D.N.Y." = United States Circuit Court for the Southern District of New York
  - e.g.,"M.D. Ala." = United States District Court for the Middle District of Alabama
- "Ct. Cl." = United States Court of Claims
- The abbreviation of a state's name alone indicates the highest appellate court in that state's judiciary at the time.
  - e.g.,"Pa." = Supreme Court of Pennsylvania
  - e.g.,"Me." = Supreme Judicial Court of Maine

== List of cases in 61 U.S. (20 How.) ==
Case Name	Page and year	Opinion of the Court	Concurring opinion(s)	Dissenting opinion(s)	Lower Court	Disposition
Morgan v. Curtenius	1 (1858)	Grier	none	none	C.C.D. Ill.	affirmed
Wynn v. Morris	3 (1857)	Catron	none	none	Ark.	dismissed
Garland v. Wynn	6 (1857)	Catron	none	none	Ark.	affirmed
Jones v. McMasters	8 (1858)	Nelson	none	none	D. Tex.	affirmed
Bacon v. Howard	22 (1858)	Grier	none	none	D. Tex.	affirmed
Christ Church v. Philadelphia County	26 (1857)	Campbell	none	none	Pa.	dismissed
Doswell v. De la Lanza	29 (1858)	McLean	none	none	D. Tex.	reversed
Wade v. Leroy	34 (1858)	Campbell	none	none	C.C.S.D.N.Y.	certification
Hudgins v. Kemp I	45 (1858)	Nelson	none	none	C.C.E.D. Va.	affirmed
Hudgins v. Kemp II	54 (1858)	Nelson	none	none	C.C.E.D. Va.	affirmed
Brown v. Shannon	55 (1858)	Taney	none	none	C.C.D. Md.	dismissed
United States v. Cambuston	59 (1858)	Nelson	none	none	N.D. Cal.	reversed
Dynes v. Hoover	65 (1858)	Wayne	none	none	C.C.D.C.	affirmed
Withers v. Buckley	84 (1858)	Daniel	none	none	Miss.	affirmed
Secombe v. Steele	94 (1858)	Campbell	none	none	Sup. Ct. Terr. Minn.	affirmed
Commerce Bank v. Buckner	108 (1858)	Wayne	none	none	C.C.E.D. La.	affirmed
Teller v. Patten	125 (1858)	McLean	none	none	C.C.D. Ind.	affirmed
Mattingly v. Boyd	128 (1858)	Catron	none	none	C.C.D.W. Tenn.	reversed
McMicken v. Perin	133 (1858)	McLean	none	none	C.C.E.D. La.	dismissed
Smith v. City of Washington	135 (1858)	Grier	none	none	C.C.D.C.	affirmed
Lyon v. Bertram	149 (1858)	Campbell	none	none	C.C.D.C.	affirmed
Hungerford v. Sigerson	156 (1858)	McLean	none	none	D. Wis.	affirmed
Grant v. Poillon	162 (1858)	McLean	none	none	C.C.S.D.N.Y.	affirmed
Hyde v. Stone	170 (1858)	Campbell	none	none	C.C.E.D. La.	affirmed
Leitensdorfer v. Webb	176 (1858)	Daniel	none	none	Sup. Ct. Terr. N.M.	affirmed
Fisher v. Haldeman	186 (1858)	Grier	none	none	C.C.E.D. Pa.	affirmed
Thompson v. Selden	194 (1858)	Taney	none	none	C.C.D.C.	affirmed
Dean v. Mason	198 (1858)	McLean	none	none	C.C.D.R.I.	reversed
Carroll v. Dorsey	204 (1857)	Taney	none	none	C.C.D.C.	dismissed
Chaffee v. Hayward	208 (1858)	Catron	none	none	C.C.D.R.I.	affirmed
Day v. Union India Rubber Company	216 (1858)	Nelson	none	none	C.C.S.D.N.Y.	affirmed
Payne v. Niles	219 (1858)	Taney	none	none	C.C.E.D. La.	dismissed
McGavock v. Woodlief	221 (1858)	Nelson	none	none	C.C.E.D. La.	reversed
Covington Drawbridge Company v. Shepherd	227 (1858)	Taney	none	Daniel	C.C.D. Ind.	affirmed
White v. Burnley	235 (1858)	Catron	none	none	D. Tex.	affirmed
United States v. Breitling	252 (1858)	Taney	none	none	C.C.S.D. Ala.	reversed
Hemmenway v. Fisher	255 (1857)	Taney	none	none	C.C.D. Mass.	amendment denied
United States v. Pacheco	261 (1858)	Taney	none	none	N.D. Cal.	dismissed
Spencer v. Lapsley	264 (1858)	Campbell	none	Daniel	D. Tex.	affirmed
Ex parte Mussina	280 (1858)	McLean	none	none	E.D. Tex.	mandamus denied
Silsby v. Foote I	290 (1858)	Nelson	none	none	C.C.N.D.N.Y.	dismissed
The Steamboat Magnolia	296 (1858)	Grier	McLean	Daniel; Campbell	M.D. Ala.	reversed
Goodman v. Simonds	343 (1858)	Clifford	none	none	C.C.D. Mo.	reversed
Gazzam v. Phillips's Lessee	372 (1858)	Nelson	none	none	Ala.	reversed
Silsby v. Foote II	378 (1858)	Nelson	none	Daniel; Grier	C.C.N.D.N.Y.	multiple
People's Ferry Company v. Beers	393 (1858)	Catron	none	none	C.C.S.D.N.Y.	reversed
McCormick v. Talcott	402 (1858)	Grier	none	Daniel	C.C.N.D. Ill.	affirmed
United States v. Fossat	413 (1858)	Campbell	none	none	N.D. Cal.	reversed
Suydam v. Williamson	427 (1858)	Clifford	none	none	C.C.S.D.N.Y.	affirmed
Brown v. Wiley	442 (1858)	Grier	none	none	D. Tex.	affirmed
Warner v. Norton	448 (1858)	McLean	none	none	C.C.N.D. Ill.	affirmed
Stinson v. Dousman	461 (1858)	Campbell	none	none	Sup. Ct. Terr. Minn.	affirmed
Roberts v. Cooper	467 (1858)	Grier	Daniel	none	C.C.D. Mich.	affirmed
Ingraham v. Dawson	486 (1858)	Catron	none	none	C.C.E.D. La.	affirmed
Sigerson v. Mathews	496 (1858)	McLean	none	none	C.C.D. Mo.	affirmed
Marks v. Dickson	501 (1858)	Catron	none	none	La.	affirmed
Selden v. Myers	506 (1858)	Taney	none	none	C.C.D.C.	affirmed
Ahl v. Johnson	511 (1858)	Clifford	none	none	Sup. Ct. Terr. Minn.	reversed
Moreland v. Page	522 (1858)	Grier	none	none	Iowa	dismissed
McFaul v. Ramsey	523 (1858)	Grier	none	none	D. Iowa	affirmed
Beers v. Arkansas	527 (1858)	Taney	none	none	Ark.	dismissed
Bank of Washington v. Arkansas	530 (1858)	Taney	none	none	Ark.	dismissed
Barton v. Forsyth	532 (1858)	Taney	none	none	C.C.N.D. Ill.	affirmed
Williams v. Gibbes	535 (1858)	Nelson	none	none	C.C.D. Md.	affirmed
Whyte v. Gibbes	541 (1858)	Nelson	none	none	C.C.D. Md.	affirmed
Snow v. Hill	543 (1858)	McLean	none	none	C.C.E.D. La.	reversed
Holcombe v. McKusick	552 (1858)	Nelson	none	none	Sup. Ct. Terr. Minn.	dismissed
McCargo v. Chapman	555 (1858)	McLean	none	none	C.C.S.D. Miss.	dismissed
Irvine v. Marshall	558 (1858)	Daniel	none	Nelson	Sup. Ct. Terr. Minn.	reversed
Sampson v. Peaslee	571 (1858)	Wayne	none	none	C.C.D. Mass.	affirmed
Ex parte Ransom	581 (1858)	Nelson	none	none	C.C.S.D.N.Y.	mandamus denied
Taylor v. Carryl	583 (1858)	Campbell	none	Taney	Pa.	affirmed

== See also ==
certificate of division
