= Theodore Winthrop =

American novelist

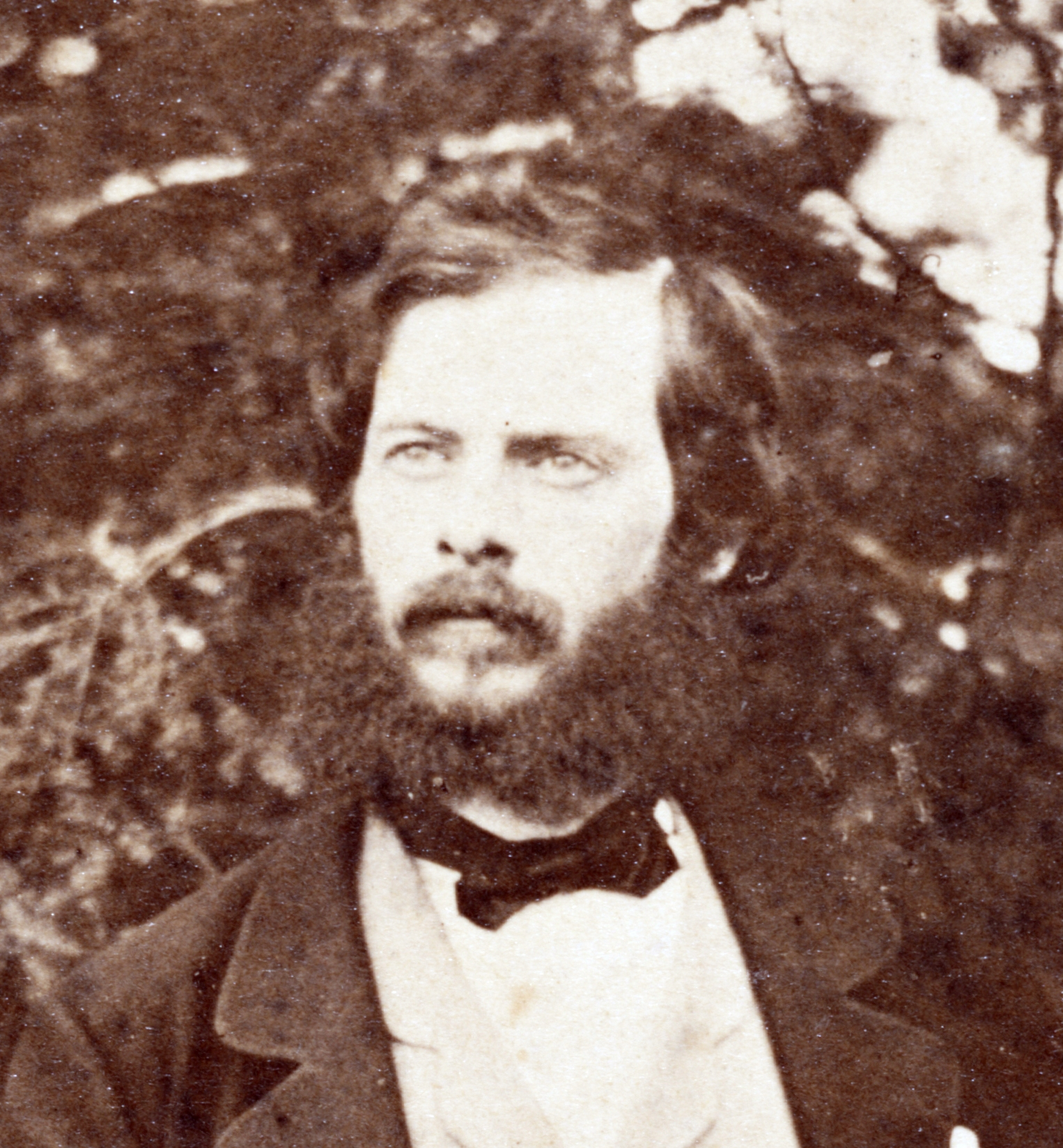
- Born: September 22, 1828; New Haven, Connecticut
- Died: June 10, 1861 (aged 32)

Signature
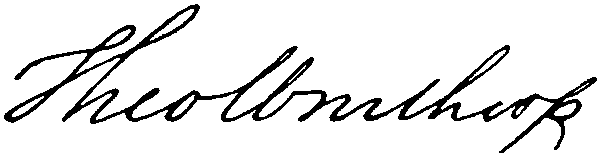

Major Theodore Woolsey Winthrop (September 22, 1828 – June 10, 1861) was a writer, lawyer, and world traveller. He was one of the first Union officers killed in the American Civil War.

== Biography ==
Winthrop was born in New Haven, Connecticut, and is a descendant of several prominent Colonial families. Through his father, he was descended from Governor John Winthrop, and through his mother, from theologian Jonathan Edwards, as well as early settlers George (Joris) Woolsey and Thomas Cornell.

He graduated in 1848 from Yale University, where his uncle Theodore Dwight Woolsey was President, and he was a member of the Phi chapter of the Delta Kappa Epsilon fraternity. He traveled for a year in Great Britain and Europe and then through the United States, settling in Staten Island in the 1850s. After contributing to periodicals, short sketches, and stories, which attracted little attention, Winthrop enlisted in the 7th Regiment, New York State Militia, an early volunteer unit of the Federal Army that answered President Abraham Lincoln's call for troops in 1861. He wrote a popular essay about the experience titled "Our March to Washington." He was appointed Major and soon became an aide-de-camp to Major General Benjamin Butler, commander of the Department of Virginia headquartered at Fort Monroe. Winthrop had long been an abolitionist, along with his younger brother William Winthrop, who later became the nation's leading authority on military law. Butler credited Winthrop with first formulating the policy that automatically conferred freedmen status on escaped slaves who entered into Union Army-held territory.

== Battle of Big Bethel ==
At the Battle of Big Bethel on June 10, 1861, he volunteered for General Ebenezer W. Peirce's staff and drew up a crude plan of battle. After a Federal attack to the enemy right flank was foiled, Winthrop led an ill-fated assault on the Confederate left held by four companies of the 1st Regiment North Carolina Infantry, under the command of Colonel (later Lieutenant General) Daniel Harvey Hill.

In the heat of battle, Major Winthrop leapt onto the trunk of a fallen tree and reportedly yelled, "One more charge boys, and the day is ours." Soon thereafter, he was killed by a Minie ball to the heart and became the first casualty of rank for the Northern side in what history regards as the first pitched land battle of the Civil War. Ironically, ardent abolitionist Winthrop may have been shot by the African-American slave of a Confederate officer in the 1st North Carolina Infantry. (Three different soldiers, as well as this slave, referred to in the records only as "Sam," claimed to have killed him.)

== Author ==
Winthrop's novels, for which he had failed to find a publisher during his lifetime, appeared posthumously. They include John Brent, founded on his experiences in the far West, and Edwin Brothertoft, a story of the American Revolution. Cecil Dreeme, his most important work with a dozen editions, was a semi-autobiographical novel dealing with social mores and gender roles set at New York University, where Winthrop had once been a lodger. Other works include The Canoe and the Saddle and Life in the Open Air. His sister, Laura Winthrop Johnson, assembled a collection of his poems and prose organized by the time period of his life Life and Poems of Theodore Winthrop.

Works published during Winthrop's lifetime include a pamphlet accompanying the painting The Heart of the Andes by his friend Frederic Edwin Church, distributed in 1859. After Winthrop's death in 1861, the Atlantic Monthly published sketches of the military campaigns in Virginia based on his own experiences.

== See also ==
- Elmer E. Ellsworth
