= Little v. Hall =

- Supreme Court of the United States

Argued January 8–9, 1856 Decided January 24, 1856
- Full case name: Little et al. v. Hall et al.
- Citations: 59 U.S. 165 (more) 18 How. 165; 15 L. Ed. 328

Holding
- The plaintiffs' publishing contract did not give them ownership of a manuscript prepared privately by a former state reporter after leaving office, so they could not obtain an injunction under federal copyright law.

Court membership
- Chief Justice Roger B. Taney Associate Justices John McLean · James M. Wayne; John Catron · Peter V. Daniel; Samuel Nelson · Robert C. Grier; Benjamin R. Curtis · John A. Campbell

Case opinion
- Majority: McLean

Little v. Hall, 59 U.S. (18 How.) 165 (1856), was a United States Supreme Court case concerning copyright in a volume of New York Court of Appeals reports prepared by former state reporter George F. Comstock. The Court held that the plaintiffs' publishing contract with state officials did not give them ownership of the manuscript Comstock prepared privately after leaving office, so they could not obtain an injunction under federal copyright law.

== Background ==
In 1850, Edwin C. Little and Oliver Scovill contracted with state officials to publish reports of New York Court of Appeals decisions. After leaving office as state reporter, George F. Comstock prepared a volume privately and sold its copyright to other publishers. Little and Scovill claimed the volume was covered by their contract and sued to stop its sale.

== Decision ==
The Court affirmed the lower court's decision in an opinion by Justice John McLean. It held that the publishing contract did not make Little and Scovill the legal owners of the manuscript Comstock prepared privately after leaving office. The Court left open whether the publishers could obtain relief against Comstock in state court for breach of contract.
