= Armed Services Board of Contract Appeals =

- (ASBCA)
- Location: Alexandria, Virginia
- Appeals to: United States Court of Appeals for the Federal Circuit
- Appeals from: Original Jurisdiction
- Established: 1949
- Judges: 24
- www.asbca.mil

The Armed Services Board of Contract Appeals (ASBCA) is an administrative tribunal within the United States Federal Government that hears certain claims arising from contract disputes between government contractors and either the Department of Defense or the National Aeronautics and Space Administration (41 U.S.C. § 7105(e)(1)(a)). The ASBCA was established in 1949 by the merger of the Navy Compensation Board, which had been established during World War I, and the War Department Board of Contract Appeals, which had been established in World War I, dissolved after the war, and reestablished in 1942 to deal with contract disputes arising out of World War II. From 1949 to 1962, the board had separate panels for Army, Navy, and Air Force disputes, which were merged into a single combined board in 1962.

The ASBCA's original jurisdiction over claims involving Government contract disputes partially overlaps as concurrent jurisdiction with the United States Court of Federal Claims under the Contract Disputes Act of 1978, 41 U.S.C. § 7104. The United States Court of Appeals for the Federal Circuit may exercise appellate jurisdiction over decisions of the ASBCA involving Government contract disputes (41 U.S.C. § 7101(a)(1)).

While several other boards for examining contract appeals against government agencies exist, the ASBCA "is the largest and has the largest staff". It has 24 judges, designated by the United States Secretary of Defense, and its facilities are located in Alexandria, Virginia.

== See also ==
- Contract Disputes Act of 1978
- Civilian Board of Contract Appeals
- United States Court of Federal Claims
- United States Court of Appeals for the Federal Circuit
