= Contract Disputes Act of 1978 =

- Other short titles: CDA
- Long title: An Act To provide for the resolution of claims and disputes relating to Government contracts awarded by executive agencies.
- Acronyms (colloquial): CDA
- Enacted by: the 95th United States Congress
- Effective: March 1, 1979

Citations
- Public law: Public Law 95-563
- Statutes at Large: 92 Stat. 2383

Codification
- Acts amended: Anti-Kickback Act of 1954 · Wunderlich Act
- U.S.C. sections created: 41 U.S.C. ch. 71 (§ 7101 et seq.)
- U.S.C. sections amended: 28 U.S.C. § 2401

Legislative history
- Introduced in the House as H.R. 11002 by George E. Danielson (D‑CA) on February 21, 1978; Committee consideration by House Committee on the Judiciary · Senate Committee on the Judiciary; Passed the House on September 26, 1978 (Voice vote); Passed the Senate as the S. 3178 on October 12, 1978 (Voice vote); Reported by the joint conference committee on October 1978; agreed to by the House on October 13, 1978 (Voice vote (agreed to amendments)) and by the Senate on October 14, 1978 (Voice vote (agreed to amendments)); Signed into law by President Jimmy Carter on November 1, 1978

The Contract Disputes Act of 1978 ("CDA", Pub. L. 95–563, 92 Stat. 2383), which became effective on March 1, 1979, establishes the procedures for handling "claims" relating to United States Federal Government contracts. It is codified, as amended, at 41 U.S.C. §§ 7101–7109.

Claims by contractors against the Federal Government must be submitted in writing to the Government's Contracting Officer for a decision. Claims by the Federal Government against a contractor must be the subject of a decision by the Contracting Officer. Apart from claims by the Federal Government alleging fraud in connection with a claim by the contractor, all claims by either the Federal Government or the contractor must be submitted within six years after the accrual of the claim.

Claims by contractors for more than $100,000 must be accompanied by a certification that (i) the claim is made in good faith, (ii) the supporting data are accurate and complete to the best of the contractor's knowledge and belief, (iii) the amount requested represents the contract adjustment for which the contractor believes the Federal Government is liable, and (iv) the certifier is authorized to submit the certification on behalf of the contractor. There are procedures in the statute for remedying certifications that do not exactly mimic the required certification language.

For claims of $100,000 or less, the Contracting Officer is required to issue a decision within 60 days of receipt of the claim provided the contractor requests a decision within that time period. For claims in excess of $100,000, the Contracting Officer is required, within 60 days, either to issue a decision or notify the contractor when a decision will be issued. All decisions should be issued within a reasonable time, taking into account the nature of the claim, and, if they are not, the contractor may either request a tribunal to direct the Contracting Officer to issue a decision within a specified time or treat the failure to issue a decision as an appealable "deemed" denial of the claim.

If the contractor is dissatisfied with the Contracting Officer's decision on a claim, the contractor may (i) appeal that decision to the cognizant agency board of contractor appeals within 90 days of receipt of the decision or (ii) bring suit on the claim in the United States Court of Federal Claims within 12 months. Decisions not appealed within one of these time periods become final and conclusive.

There are procedures in the statute authorizing the use of mutually agreeable alternative dispute resolution techniques for handling disputes and well as for the use of streamlined and accelerated litigation procedures for smaller claims at the boards of contract appeals.

The losing party may appeal a decision by either a board of contract appeals or the United States Court of Federal Claims to the Court of Appeals for the Federal Circuit.

A contractor is entitled to interest on the amount found due on its claim running from the date the Contracting Officer received the claim until the claim is paid.
