= Civilian Board of Contract Appeals =

The Civilian Board of Contract Appeals (CBCA) is an adjudicative board composed of federal administrative judges that is housed within but functionally independent of the General Services Administration. The Civilian Board of Contract Appeals was established by Section 847 of the National Defense Authorization Act for Fiscal Year 2006, with an effective date of January 6, 2007, to hear and decide contract disputes between government contractors and executive agencies under the provisions of the Contract Disputes Act, 41 U.S.C. §§ 7101 et seq., and regulations and rules issued under that statute.

== Jurisdiction ==
The CBCA decides disputes between government contractors and executive agencies of the United States. The Board's authority extends to all executive agencies other than the Department of Defense, the National Aeronautics and Space Administration, the United States Postal Service, the Postal Regulatory Commission, the Federal Aviation Administration, and the Tennessee Valley Authority.

The CBCA’s original jurisdiction over claims involving Government contract disputes partially overlaps as concurrent jurisdiction with the United States Court of Federal Claims under the Contract Disputes Act. The United States Court of Appeals for the Federal Circuit may exercise appellate jurisdiction over decisions of the Board involving government contract disputes (28 U.S.C. § 1295).

The Board also hears and decides various additional classes of cases, including

- Cases arising under the Indian Self-Determination Act, 25 U.S.C. §§ 5325(f), 5331(d);
- Disputes between insurance companies and the Department of Agriculture's Risk Management Agency involving actions of the Federal Crop Insurance Corporation under 7 U.S.C. §§ 1501 et seq.;
- Claims by federal employees under 31 U.S.C. § 3702 for reimbursement of expenses incurred while on official temporary duty travel or in connection with relocation to a new duty station;
- Claims by carriers or freight forwarders under 31 U.S.C. § 3726(i)(1) for payment of transportation services;
- Applications by prevailing private parties for recovery of litigation and other costs under the Equal Access to Justice Act, 5 U.S.C. § 504;
- Requests for arbitration under section 601 of the American Recovery and Reinvestment Act of 2009, Pub. L. No. 111-5, and section 565 of the Consolidated and Further Continuing Appropriations Act, 2013, Pub. L. No. 113-6, to resolve disputes between applicants and the Federal Emergency Management Agency (FEMA) as to funding for public assistance grant applications arising from damages caused by Hurricanes Katrina and Rita;
- Requests for arbitration under Section 423 of the Robert T. Stafford Disaster Relief and Emergency Assistance Act (Stafford Act), 42 U.S.C. § 5189a(d), as amended by Section 1219 of the Federal Aviation Administration Reauthorization Act of 2018, Pub. L. No. 115-254, to resolve disputes between FEMA and applicants for public assistance disaster grants arising from disasters that occurred after January 1, 2016; and
- Disputes between federal long-term-care insurance carriers and the Office of Personnel Management under 5 U.S.C. Chapter 90 and 5 CFR Part 875.

== Procedure ==
The Board uses a variety of techniques intended to shorten and simplify, when appropriate, the formal proceedings normally used to resolve contract disputes. The Board fully supports the use of alternative dispute resolution (ADR) in all appropriate cases; it encourages the prompt, expert, and inexpensive resolution of contract disputes as promoted by the Administrative Dispute Resolution Act. In addition, the Board provides to other executive agencies, when jointly requested by an agency and its contractor, alternative dispute resolution services on contract-related matters, whether arising before or after a contract has been awarded.

== History ==
The Civilian Board of Contract Appeals was created by consolidating eight former boards of contract appeals:

- General Services Administration Board of Contract Appeals (GSBCA)
- Department of Transportation Board of Contract Appeals (DOTBCA)
- Department of Agriculture Board of Contract Appeals (AGBCA)
- Department of Veterans Affairs Board of Contract Appeals (VABCA)
- Department of the Interior Board of Contract Appeals (IBCA)
- Department of Energy Board of Contract Appeals (EBCA)
- Department of Housing and Urban Development Board of Contract Appeals (HUDBCA)
- Department of Labor Board of Contract Appeals (LBCA)

== See also ==
- Contract Disputes Act of 1978
- Tucker Act
- Armed Services Board of Contract Appeals
- United States Court of Federal Claims
- United States Court of Appeals for the Federal Circuit
