= List of United States Supreme Court copyright case law =

This is a list of Supreme Court of the United States cases in the area of copyright law. In the United States Constitution, the Copyright Clause in Article 1, Section 8 endows Congress with the power to create a copyright system. To avoid individual states' attempts at creating their own copyright systems, Congress passed the Copyright Act of 1790, based on Great Britain's Statute of Anne. Over the decades since, copyright in the United States has become a more complicated system with longer terms and more tests, and has been the subject of many decisions by the Court.

The Supreme Court was the source of a number of concepts in the field, including fair use, the idea-expression divide, the useful articles or separability doctrine, and the uncopyrightability of federal documents.

This list is solely of United States Supreme Court decisions about applying copyright law. Not all Supreme Court decisions are ultimately influential and, as in other fields, not all important decisions are made at the Supreme Court level. Many federal courts issue rulings that are significant or come to be influential, but those are outside the scope of this list.

Because they share a clause of the Constitution and much the same justifications, there is considerable overlap between patent and copyright jurisprudence. As such, patent cases may appear in this list if they make their connections to copyright explicit in the opinions.

== 19th century ==
Case	Citation	Year	Vote	Classification	Subject Matter	Opinions	Statute Interpreted	Summary
Wheaton v. Peters	33 U.S. 591	1834	5–2	Substantive	Copyrightability of laws, Common law copyright, Copyright formalities	Majority: McLean; Dissent: Thompson, Baldwin	Copyright Act of 1790, Copyright Act of 1831	There is no such thing as common law copyright after publication and one must observe the formalities to secure a copyright.
Backus v. Gould	48 U.S. 798	1849	9–0	Substantive	Statutory damages for copyright infringement	Majority: McLean (unanimous)	Copyright Act of 1831	The 1831 Act requires the courts award damages from copyright infringement based on the number of copies found in the accused's possession, not the number of infringing copies that they ever printed.
Stephens v. Cady	55 U.S. 528	1852	9–0	Substantive	Copyright transfer	Majority: Nelson (unanimous)	Copyright Act of 1831	Buying a map's copperplate in an execution sale does not imply purchasing the copyright.
Stevens v. Gladding	58 U.S. 447	1854	9–0	Substantive	Copyright transfer, Equity	Majority: Curtis (unanimous)	Copyright Act of 1831	The copyright of a work is not attached to the physical copperplate used to print the work, so purchasing the copperplate does not purchase the copyright.
Little v. Hall	59 U.S. 165	1856	9–0	Substantive	Copyright transfer, Copyrightability of laws	Majority: McLean (unanimous)	Copyright Act of 1831	A contract with state officials to be the official publisher of court opinion documents does not transfer any copyright to that publisher, and they may not seek an injunction against someone else printing those documents.
Paige v. Banks	80 U.S. 608	1872	9–0	Substantive	Copyright transfer, Copyright renewal in the United States	Majority: Davis (unanimous)	Copyright Act of 1790, Copyright Act of 1831	An agreement that transfers a copyright from the original author to a second party for perpetuity does not end with the statutory limit of copyright at the time the parties made the deal.
Perris v. Hexamer	99 U.S. 674	1879	9–0	Substantive	Copyrightability of symbols	Majority: Waite	Copyright Act of 1870	A map-maker has no more an exclusive right to use the form of the characters they employ to express their ideas on a map than they have to use the typeface they use for text.
Trade-Mark Cases	100 U.S. 82	1879	9–0	Non-Copyright	Constitutional basis for trademark regulation	Majority: Miller (unanimous)	Copyright Clause, Copyright Act of 1870, Unconstitutional trademark acts	The Copyright Clause does not give Congress the power to regulate trademarks because trademarks are not writings, discoveries, or inventions.
Baker v. Selden	101 U.S. 99	1879	9–0	Substantive	Idea–expression divide, Useful art	Majority: Bradley (unanimous)	Copyright Act of 1831	Exclusive rights to the "useful art" described in a book are only available by patent. The description itself is protectable by copyright.
Merrell v. Tice	104 U.S. 557	1881	9–0	Substantive		Majority: Bradley	Copyright Act of 1870, amendment in 1874	Because statutory procedures exist for producing evidence of copyright formality observance, evidence of at least such veracity is required to prove copyright claims.
Schreiber v. Sharpless	110 U.S. 76	1884	9–0	Substantive		Majority: Waite	Copyright Act of 1870	Charges of copyright infringement do not survive the death of the accused and may not be transferred to the executors of their will.
Burrow-Giles Lithographic Co. v. Sarony	111 U.S. 53	1884	9–0	Substantive	Copyrightability of photography	Majority: Miller (unanimous)	Copyright Act of 1870, amendment in 1874	Extended copyright protection to photography.
Thornton v. Schreiber	124 U.S. 612	1888	9–0	Substantive		Majority: Miller	Copyright Act of 1870	A copyright holder may not personally sue an employee of a business for copyright infringement if the employee was holding the infringing material on the order of their employer.
Banks v. Manchester	128 U.S. 244	1888	9–0	Substantive	Copyrightability of laws	Majority: Blatchford (unanimous)	Copyright Act of 1870	No copyright in state Supreme Court opinions.
Callaghan v. Myers	128 U.S. 617	1888	9–0	Substantive	Copyrightability of laws, Public domain	Majority: Blatchford (unanimous)	Copyright Act of 1831, Copyright Act of 1870	Arrangements of public domain records can represent copyrightable intellectual effort.
Thompson v. Hubbard	131 U.S. 123	1889	9–0	Substantive	Formalities	Majority: Blatchford (unanimous)	Copyright Act of 1870, amendment in 1874	A later owner of a copyright is entitled to sue a previous owner for copyright infringement. However, the later owner's failure to observe formalities voids copyright and a nonexistent copyright cannot be infringed.
Higgins v. Keuffel	140 U.S. 428	1891	9–0	Substantive		Majority: Field (unanimous)	Copyright Act of 1831, Copyright Act of 1870, amendment in 1874	A label describing the contents of a container is not subject to copyright.
Belford v. Scribner	144 U.S. 488	1892	8–0	Substantive		Majority: Blatchford	Copyright Act of 1870	1) A copyright is held by default with the person whose name it was taken out in, regardless of potential conflicts with state law. 2) If a work contains a mixture of original and copyright infringing material, but it is so intermingled as to be inseparable, then the copyright holder may take all profits from the work.
Press Pub. Co. v. Monroe	164 U.S. 105	1896	9–0	Procedural	Diversity jurisdiction, Common law copyright	Majority: Gray (unanimous)	International Copyright Act of 1891	Due to diversity jurisdiction, the circuit court's decision was valid. Dismissed because a Supreme Court petition must invoke the Constitution or the laws of the United States, and a common law copyright claim does neither.
Holmes v. Hurst	174 U.S. 82	1899	9–0	Substantive		Majority: Brown (unanimous)	Copyright Act of 1831	When someone begins printing a serial book in a magazine, they may file for copyright of the entire book even if the book does not exist as a completed whole.
Brady v. Daly	175 U.S. 148	1899	9–0	Procedural	Statutory damages for copyright infringement, Equity	Peckham (unanimous)	Copyright Act of 1831, amendment in 1856, Copyright Act of 1870	The common law circuit court did have jurisdiction over the copyright infringement case because the statutory damages were not a penalty or forfeiture.
Bolles v. Outing Co.	175 U.S. 262	1899	9–0	Substantive		Majority: Brown (White) (unanimous)	Copyright Act of 1831, Copyright Act of 1870	Copies already distributed are out of scope of copyright infringement damage lawsuits.

== 20th century ==
Case	Citation	Year	Vote	Classification	Subject Matter	Opinions	Statute Interpreted	Summary
Bleistein v. Donaldson Lithographing Company	188 U.S. 239	1903	7–2	Substantive	Copyrightability of commercial art	Majority: Holmes; Dissent: Harlan (McKenna)	Copyright Act of 1870, amendment in 1874	Copyright protection of illustrations made for advertisements
Mifflin v. R. H. White Company	190 U.S. 260	1903	9–0	Substantive		Majority: Brown (unanimous)	Copyright Act of 1831	The authorized appearance of a work in a magazine without a copyright notice specifically dedicated to that work transfers that work into the public domain.
Mifflin v. Dutton	190 U.S. 265	1903	9–0	Substantive		Majority: Brown (unanimous)	Copyright Act of 1831	The authorized appearance of a work in a magazine without a copyright notice specifically dedicated to that work transfers that work into the public domain.
McLoughlin v. Raphael Tuck & Sons Co.	191 U.S. 267	1903	8–0	Substantive		Majority: White (unanimous)	Copyright Act of 1870, amendment in 1895, International Copyright Act of 1891	Articles of a class made illegal by a statute that existed in the United States before the statute came into effect are still legal.
American Tobacco Co. v. Werckmeister	207 U.S. 284	1907	9–0	Substantive	Asset forfeiture, Unreasonable search and seizure	Majority: Day (unanimous)	Copyright Act of 1870, amendment in 1895, Fourth Amendment, International Copyright Act of 1891	The seizure by the United States marshal in a copyright case of certain pictures under a writ of replevin did not constitute an unreasonable search and seizure.
Werckmeister v. American Tobacco Co.	207 U.S. 375	1907	9–0	Procedural	Asset forfeiture	Majority: Day (unanimous)	Copyright Act of 1870, amendment in 1895	A copyright holder is limited to one action to collect infringing copies and statutory damages because the act's remedies are penal and must be observed without construction.
United Dictionary Co. v. G. & C. Merriam Co.	208 U.S. 260	1908	9–0	Substantive	Formalities	Majority: Holmes (unanimous)	Copyright Act of 1870, amendment in 1874	The requirement that notice reside in each copy of every edition does not extend to works published and sold abroad only.
White-Smith Music Publishing Co. v. Apollo Co.	209 U.S. 1	1908	9–0	Substantive	Public performance right in music	Majority: Day (unanimous); Concurrence: Holmes	International Copyright Act of 1891; Copyright Act of 1870, amendment in 1897	Reproduction of the sounds of musical instruments playing music for which copyright granted not a violation of the copyright.
Dun v. Lumbermen's Credit Ass'n	209 U.S. 20	1908	9–0			Majority: Moody (unanimous)	Copyright Act of 1870	The existence of some copyright-infringing information in a rote reference work does not entitle the original author to seek an injunction against printing the later article when the later article's contents demonstrate significant original work.
Bobbs-Merrill Co. v. Straus	210 U.S. 339	1908	9–0	Substantive	First-sale doctrine	Majority: Day (unanimous)	Copyright Act of 1870	No license to use copyrighted material. License cannot extend holder's rights beyond statute defined by Congress.
Scribner v. Straus	210 U.S. 352	1908	9–0			Majority: Day (unanimous)	Copyright Act of 1870	Copyright holders did not have the statutory right to control the price of subsequent resales of lawfully purchased copies of their work.
Globe Newspaper Co. v. Walker	210 U.S. 356	1908	9–0			Majority: Day (unanimous)	Copyright Act of 1790, International Copyright Act of 1891	Congress having provided a remedy for those whose copyrights in maps are infringed, a civil action at common law for money damages cannot be maintained against the infringers.
Bong v. Campbell Art Co.	214 U.S. 236	1909	9–0	Substantive	International copyright treaties	Majority: McKenna (unanimous)	Copyright Act of 1870, amendment and 1895, International Copyright Act of 1891	A copyright cannot be granted to a non-citizen whose country has not been acknowledged as in a reciprocal copyright arrangement with the United States by a formal presidential proclamation. Because the non-citizen is not granted a copyright, they cannot assign a copyright for a work to a citizen of a country with American copyright privileges. That citizen cannot register a copyright for the work.
Caliga v. Inter Ocean Newspaper Co.	215 U.S. 182	1909	9–0	Substantive		Majority: Day (unanimous)	International Copyright Act of 1891	A person cannot file a second copyright claim to amend the first, even if the first was determined to be invalid.
Hills and Co. v. Hoover	220 U.S. 329	1911	9–0			Majority: Day	International Copyright Act of 1891, Copyright Act of 1909	
American Lithographic Co. v. Werkmeister	221 U.S. 603	1911	9–0			Majority: Hughes (unanimous)		A corporation defendant in a suit to enforce copyright infringement penalties is not entitled to a Fourth or Fifth Amendment objection to the admission of its bookkeeping entries into evidence when they are produced under a subpoena.
Kalem Co. v. Harper Bros.	222 U.S. 55	1911	9–0	Substantive	Derivative works, Idea-expression dichotomy, Secondary liability	Majority: Holmes (unanimous)	Copyright Clause, International Copyright Act of 1891	Producing a motion picture based on a dramatic work can be copyright infringement. The producer of the motion picture is liable even they are not the exhibitor. This does not extend to a restriction of the dramatic work's ideas; it is a recognition of the author's monopoly powers granted by Congress.
Ferris v. Frohman	223 U.S. 424	1912	9–0	Substantive	Publication and Public Performance	Majority: Hughes (unanimous)		An unauthorized public production of an unpublished play does not invalidate the play owner's common law copyright.
Henry v. A.B. Dick Co.	224 U.S. 1	1912	4–3	Non-Copyright	Patent infringement, Tying	Majority: Lurton (McKenna, Holmes, Van Devanter); Dissent: White (Hughes, Lamar)	Patent Act of 1870	Patent owners can prescribe requirements to how licensees may use their patented invention. Selling a product that knowingly contravenes one of those restrictions is contributory infringement of the patent.
Bauer & Cie. v. O'Donnell	229 U.S. 1	1913	5–4	Non-Copyright	Intersection of patents and first-sale doctrine	Majority: Day; Dissent: Holmes (McKenna, Lurton, Van Devanter)		Differences between patent and copyright defined also prohibits a license from extending rightsholders' rights beyond statute. Rights of copyright holder regarding "use" of copyrighted works.
Straus v. American Publishers Association	231 U.S. 222	1913	9–0			Majority: Day		An agreement that is manifestly anti-competitive and illegal under the Sherman Antitrust Act cannot be justified by copyright.
Order of St. Benedict of New Jersey v. Steinhauser	234 U.S. 640	1914	9–0			Majority: Hughes (unanimous)		When someone joins an ecclesiastical order, subject to individual state law, their income from copyright may be dedicated to that order's common fund as much as any other income or form of property. This does not violate any part of the Constitution if the member may withdraw from the order at any time.
DeJonge and Co. v. Breuker & Kessler Co.	235 U.S. 33	1914	9–0			Majority: Holmes (unanimous)		Every instance of a copyrighted work must observe copyright notice formalities for the work to maintain copyright, even if the work appears multiple times on the same sheet of paper. Every copy of a copyrighted painting must bear the notice for the painting to maintain copyright.
G. & C. Merriam Co. v. Syndicate Pub. Co.	237 U.S. 618	1915	9–0	Non-Copyright		Majority: Day	Trade Mark Act of 1881	After a copyrighted work expires, the word used to designate that work falls into the public domain and cannot be trademarked.
Herbert v. Shanley Co.	242 U.S. 591	1917	9–0	Substantive	Public performance of live music in business establishments	Majority: Holmes (unanimous)	Copyright Act of 1909	Hotels & restaurants that perform music must compensate composers, even if the venue is not separately charging patrons to hear the music.
International News Service v. Associated Press	248 U.S. 215	1918	5–3	Non-Copyright	Hot News	Majority: Pitney; Dissent: Holmes (McKenna), Brandeis		While the information found in AP news was not copyrightable and subject to publici juris, AP has a quasi-property interest during the production of "hot news".
L. A. Westermann Co. v. Dispatch Printing Co.	249 U.S. 100	1919	9–0			Majority: Van Devanter		Penalties awarded "in lieu of actual damages and profits" cannot be less than $250 for each case of copyright infringement.
Manners v. Morosco	252 U.S. 317	1920	7–2	Substantive	Derivative works	Majority: Holmes; Dissent: Clarke (Pitney)	Copyright Act of 1909	1) The copyright transfer contract was not limited to five years because the agreement dealt in minimum requirements. 2) A transfer of the copyright for the production of a play on stage does not grant the ability to make a motion picture based on the play. However, a grant of exclusivity implies a negative guarantee that the original creator will not do anything that may adversely affect that exclusivity, meaning the author forfeited their own ability to authorize a motion picture production.
Lumiere v. Mae Edna Wilder, Inc.	261 U.S. 174	1923	9–0			Majority: Brandeis		A person or corporation cannot file suits under the Copyright Act in areas in which they do not have an office and do no business.
Fox Film Corp. v. Knowles	261 U.S. 326	1923	9–0			Majority: Holmes		The statute intends that an executor, there being no widow, widower, or child, shall have the same right to renew a copyright for a second term as his testator might have exercised had he continued to survive.
Educational Films Corp. v. Ward	282 U.S. 379	1931	6–3	Substantive	Corporate tax	Majority: Stone; Dissent: Sutherland (Van Devanter, Butler)	New York Tax Law, Article 9-A	A corporate income tax may include royalties from copyrights in its calculation of overall income even though direct income from copyrights, a federal institution, is immune from state taxation.
Buck v. Jewell-LaSalle Realty Co.	283 U.S. 191	1931	9–0	Substantive	Public performance right in radio broadcasts in business establishments	Majority: Brandeis (unanimous)	Copyright Act of 1909	A hotel operator which provided headphones connected to a centrally controlled radio receiver was guilty of copyright infringement, because "reception of a radio broadcast and its translation into audible sound is not a mere audition of the original program. It is essentially a reproduction." NB: Gene Buck, plaintiff, was president of ASCAP.
Fox Film Corp. v. Doyal	286 U.S. 123	1932	9–0	Substantive	State government taxation of copyright royalties	Majority: Hughes (unanimous)		States may tax copyright royalties, as they can patent royalties, because even though copyrights & patents are granted by the federal government, they are still private property subject to taxation.
George v. Victor Talking Machine Co.	293 U.S. 377	1934	9–0			per curiam		The district court's ruling of infringement of a song's common law copyright, granting an injunction so that damages could be determined, was interlocutory. The appeal came too late, so the Court vacated the appeal.
Douglas v. Cunningham	294 U.S. 207	1935	9–0				Copyright Act of 1909	The statute allowed an award of $5,000 instead of a copyright infringement damages calculation based on the newspaper's circulation.
KVOS v. Associated Press	299 U.S. 269	1936	8–0	Non-Copyright	Hot news	Majority: Roberts		An association of newspapers cannot sue collectively to raise their projected damages above the minimum damages required for federal jurisdiction when only individual newspapers are parties to unfair competition.
Interstate Circuit, Inc. v. United States	304 U.S. 55	1938	5–3			Majority: Stone; Dissent: O. Roberts (McReynolds, Butler)	Sherman Antitrust Act	
Washingtonian Pub. Co. v. Pearson	306 U.S. 30	1939	6–3	Substantive	Formalities	Majority: McReynolds; Dissent: Black (O. Roberts, Reed)	Copyright Act of 1909	The 1909 Act's deposit requirement did not require immediate deposit, or deposit before infringement occurs, in order to bring a suit for infringement
Gibbs v. Buck	307 U.S. 66	1939	8–1	Substantive		Majority: Reed; Dissent: Black		1) An association of copyright holders, ASCAP, may sum their collective costs to meet the damages threshold for federal jurisdiction. 2) A motion to dismiss allegations that raise "grave doubts about the constitutionality" of legislation should be denied.
Buck v. Gallagher	307 U.S. 95	1939	8–1	Substantive		Majority: Reed; Dissent: Black		1) ASCAP members have a common and undivided interest in the right to license in association through the Society free of the state statute. 2) The lower court should have allowed ASCAP members the opportunity to price the cost of complying with the statute and the value of the copyrights affected by it.
Sheldon v. Metro-Goldwyn Pictures Corp.	309 U.S. 390	1940	8–0	Procedural	Damages	Majority: Hughes (unanimous)	Copyright Act of 1909	In the case of an unauthorized adaptation, court may elect to award only a portion of an infringer's profits to the plaintiff.
Fashion Originators' Guild of America v. FTC	312 U.S. 457	1941	9–0	Non-Copyright	Antitrust	Majority: Black	Clayton Antitrust Act of 1914, Sherman Antitrust Act	A practice short of a complete monopoly but which tends to create a monopoly and to deprive the public of the advantages from free competition in interstate trade, offends the policy of the Sherman Act. Specifically, the Guild was trying to create an artificial copyright monopoly via boycotts because clothes were uncopyrightable at the time.
Watson v. Buck	313 U.S. 387	1941				Majority: Black		The Copyright Act does not authorize copyright holders to violate valid anti-trust laws.
Marsh v. Buck	313 U.S. 406	1941				Majority: Black		General statements that the law will be enforced if enacted are not threats against entities subject to the law.
Fred Fisher Music Co. v. M. Witmark & Sons	318 U.S. 643	1943	5–3	Substantive	Renewal terms and assignment	Majority: Frankfurter; Dissent: Black, Douglas, Murphy	Copyright Act of 1909	The renewal of copyright for the second term is not an opportunity for an author to renegotiate terms made during the first term that extended beyond the first term's length.
United States v. Paramount Pictures, Inc.	334 U.S. 131	1948	7–1	Non-Copyright	Antitrust	Majority: Douglas; Dissent: Frankfurter (in part)	Sherman Antitrust Act	Practice of block booking and ownership of theater chains by film studios constituted anti-competitive and monopolistic trade practices.
Commissioner v. Wodehouse	337 U.S. 369	1949	6–3	Non-Copyright	Taxation	Majority: Burton; Dissent: Frankfurter (Murphy, Jackson)	Revenue Act of 1934, Revenue Act of 1936	Lump sums paid in advance by publications to non-resident aliens are taxable income under the Revenue Act and are indistinguishable from "royalties" paid over time within the meaning of that Act.
F. W. Woolworth Co. v. Contemporary Arts, Inc.	344 U.S. 227	1952	7–2	Procedural	Election of remedies, Statutory damages for copyright infringement	Majority: Jackson; Dissent: Black (Frankfurter)	Copyright Act of 1909	Court may grant statutory damages, even when infringer proves its gross profits were less than the statutory award. Judges granted wide latitude when determining legal remedies based on the facts of the case.
Mazer v. Stein	347 U.S. 201	1954	7–2	Substantive	Copyrightability of sculpture, Idea/Expression Dichotomy, Useful art	Majority: Reed; Dissent: Douglas (Black)	Copyright Act of 1909	Extended copyright protection to functional art.
De Sylva v. Ballentine	351 U.S. 570	1956	9–0	Substantive	Renewal terms and beneficiaries	Majority: Harlan II (unanimous)	Copyright Act of 1909	After the death of an author, the widow and children are eligible to renew copyright, equally as a class. Additionally, conditional on state laws, illegitimate children are also eligible for a share of the copyright.
Columbia Broadcasting System, Inc. v. Loew's, Inc.	356 U.S. 43	1958	4–4	Substantive	Fair use in parody	per curiam		aff'd 4-4 sub. nom., Benny v. Loew's, 239 F.2d 532 (9th Cir. 1956)
Miller Music Corp. v. Charles N. Daniels, Inc.	362 U.S. 373	1960	5–4	Substantive	Duration	Majority: Douglas; Dissent: Harlan II (Frankfurter, Whittaker, Stewart)		The executor of a copyright holder's will is eligible to renew that copyright.
Pub. Affairs Associates, Inc. v. Rickover	369 U.S. 111	1962	5–3			per curiam Concurrence: Douglas		
Sears, Roebuck & Co. v. Stiffel Co.	376 U.S. 225	1964	9–0	Non-Copyright	Public domain	Majority: Black; Concurrence: Harlan II	Copyright Act of 1909, Copyright Clause, Supremacy Clause	An unpatented article belongs to the public and a state law that would prevent its copying would violate the Supremacy Clause.
Fortnightly Corp. v. United Artists Television, Inc.	392 U.S. 390	1968	5–1	Substantive	Public performance of broadcast television	Majority: Stewart; Dissent: Fortas		Receiving a television broadcast (of a licensed work) does not constitute a "performance"
Goldstein v. California	412 U.S. 546	1973	5–4	Non-Copyright	Federal pre-emption of state criminal copyright law	Majority: Burger; Dissent: Douglas (Brennan, Blackmun), Marshall (Brennan, Blackmun)		California's state statutes criminalizing record piracy did not violate the Copyright Clause
Teleprompter Corp. v. Columbia Broadcasting	415 U.S. 394	1974	6–3	Substantive	Public performance of broadcast television	Majority: Stewart; Dissent: Blackmun (in part), Douglas (Burger)		Receiving a television broadcast from a "distant" source does not constitute a "performance"
Twentieth Century Music Corp. v. Aiken	422 U.S. 151	1975	7–2	Substantive	Public performance of radio broadcasts in business establishments	Majority: Stewart; Dissent: Burger (Douglas); Concurrence: Blackmun		Receiving a radio broadcast of a licensed work does not constitute a "performance". This effectively overruled Buck v. Jewel-LaSalle Realty Co. (1931)
Williams & Wilkins Co. v. United States	420 U.S. 376	1975	4–4	Substantive	Fair use in photocopies	per curiam	Copyright Act of 1909, National Library of Medicine Act, Medical Library Assistance Act of 1965	Affirmed by an equally divided court. It is a fair use for libraries to photocopy articles for use by patrons engaged in scientific research.
Zacchini v. Scripps-Howard Broadcasting Co.	433 U.S. 562	1977	5–4	Substantive		Majority: White; Dissent: Powell (Brennan, Marshall), Stevens	Copyright Act of 1976	The First and Fourteenth Amendments do not immunize the news media from civil liability when they broadcast a performer's entire act without his consent, nor does the Constitution prevent a State from requiring broadcasters to compensate performers.
Broadcast Music v. Columbia Broadcasting System	441 U.S. 1	1979	8–1	Non-Copyright	Antitrust and copyright collective rights organizations	Majority: White; Dissent: Stevens	Sherman Antitrust Act	The issuance by ASCAP and BMI of blanket licenses does not constitute price-fixing per se unlawful under the antitrust laws
Sony Corp. of America v. Universal City Studios, Inc.	464 U.S. 417	1984	5–4	Substantive	Secondary liability and fair use in home recordings	Majority: Stevens; Dissent: Blackmun (Marshall, Powell, Rehnquist)	Copyright Act of 1976	The Betamax Case
Mills Music, Inc. v. Snyder	469 U.S. 153	1985	5–4	Substantive	Termination	Majority: Stevens; Dissent: White (Brennan, Marshall, Blackmun)	Copyright Act of 1976	If the author of a work authorizes derivatives, the terms negotiated in exchange for that grant stand even if the grant is later rescinded. If the copyright holder deputizes another person to authorize derivative works, the law draws no distinction between such works and those directly authorized by the copyright holder.
Harper & Row v. Nation Enterprises	471 U.S. 539	1985	6–3	Substantive	Fair use in excerpts	Majority: O'Connor; Dissent: Brennan (White, Marshall)	Copyright Act of 1976	The interest served by republication of a public figure's account of an event is not sufficient to permit nontransformative Fair use.
Dowling. v. United States	473 U.S. 207	1985	6–3	Non-Copyright	Criminal law impact of infringement	Majority: Blackmun; Dissent: Powell (Burger, White)	Clayton Antitrust Act of 1914	Copyright infringement is not theft, conversion, or fraud; illegally made copies are not stolen goods.
Community for Creative Non-Violence v. Reid	490 U.S. 730	1989	9–0	Substantive	Work-made-for-hire	Majority: Marshall (unanimous)	Copyright Act of 1976	The default rule is that the artist who creates a commissioned work retains copyright ownership of the work (because the artist is an independent contractor and not an employee producing a work made for hire.) However, this is only a presumption which can be modified by contract.
Stewart v. Abend	495 U.S. 207	1990	6–3	Substantive	Derivative works	Majority: O'Connor; Dissent: Stevens (Rehnquist, Scalia); Concurrence: White	Copyright Act of 1976	Rights of the successor of a copyright interest
Feist Publications, Inc. v. Rural Telephone Service Co.	499 U.S. 340	1991	9–0	Substantive	Copyrightability of facts and Idea/Expression Dichotomy	Majority: O'Connor; Concurrence: Blackmun	Copyright Act of 1976	Affirmed the need for a minimal amount of creativity before a work is copyrightable. "Sweat of the brow" alone is not sufficient to bestow copyright.
Fogerty v. Fantasy, Inc.	510 U.S. 517	1994	9–0	Procedural	Attorneys Fees	Majority: Rehnquist; Concurrence: Thomas	Copyright Act of 1976	Attorney's fees in copyright litigation may be awarded to successful defendants, as well as to successful plaintiffs
Campbell v. Acuff-Rose Music, Inc.	510 U.S. 569	1994	9–0	Substantive	Fair use in Commercial Parody	Majority: Souter; Concurrence: Kennedy	Copyright Act of 1976	Commercial parody can be fair use.
Lotus Dev. Corp. v. Borland Int'l, Inc.	516 U.S. 233	1995	4–4	Substantive	Copyrightability of software program interfaces	per curiam	Copyright Act of 1976	Scope of software copyrights.
Quality King Distributors, Inc. v. L'anza Research Int'l, Inc.	523 U.S. 135	1998	9–0	Substantive	Reimportation	Majority: Stevens; Concurrence: Ginsburg	Copyright Act of 1976	First-sale doctrine applies to reimported goods
Feltner v. Columbia Pictures Television, Inc.	523 U.S. 340	1998	9–0	Procedural	Right to Jury Trial, Statutory damages for copyright infringement	Majority: Thomas; Concurrence: Scalia	Copyright Act of 1976, Seventh Amendment	Seventh Amendment right to jury trial in a copyright infringement case

== 21st century ==
Case	Citation	Year	Vote	Classification	Subject Matter	Opinions	Statute Interpreted	Summary
New York Times Co. v. Tasini	533 U.S. 483	2001	7–2	Substantive	Collective works	Majority: Ginsburg; Dissent: Stevens (Breyer)	Copyright Act of 1976	Freelance journalists did not grant electronic republication rights for collective work.
Eldred v. Ashcroft	537 U.S. 186	2003	7–2	Substantive	Term Extension	Majority: Ginsburg; Dissent: Stevens, Breyer	Copyright Clause, Copyright Act of 1976	Challenge to Copyright Term Extension Act of 1998; held Congress may retroactively extend the duration of works still under copyright, as long as the extension is limited.
Dastar Corp. v. Twentieth Century Fox Film Corp.	539 U.S. 23	2003	8–0	Non-Copyright	Intersection of TM law with public domain works	Majority: Scalia (unanimous)	Lanham Act	Trademark cannot preserve rights to a public domain work.
Metro-Goldwyn-Mayer Studios Inc. v. Grokster, Ltd.	545 U.S. 913	2005	9–0	Substantive	Secondary liability	Majority: Souter (unanimous); Concurrence: Ginsburg (Rehnquist, Kennedy), Breyer (Stevens, O'Connor)	Copyright Act of 1976	Distributors of peer-to-peer file-sharing software can be liable for copyright infringement if there are "affirmative steps taken to foster infringement".
Microsoft Corp. v. AT&T Corp.	550 U.S. 437	2007	7–1	Non-Copyright	Patent infringement	Majority: Ginsburg; Concurrence: Alito (Thomas, Breyer) (in all but part); Dissent: Stevens	35 U.S.C. § 271(f) (Patent Act)	Liability for such unauthorized replication and installation of software in foreign countries must arise under the patent laws of foreign countries. Although a patent case, it discusses the nature of what is a copy of software.
Reed Elsevier, Inc. v. Muchnick	559 U.S. 154	2010	8–0	Procedural	Registration	Majority: Thomas; Concurrence: Ginsburg (Stevens, Breyer)	Copyright Act of 1976	Settlement of copyright infringement claims relating to an electronic database
Omega S.A. v. Costco Wholesale Corp.	562 U.S. 40	2010	4–4	Substantive	First-sale doctrine	per curiam	Copyright Act of 1976	Affirming 541 F.3d 982 (9th Cir. 2008)
Golan v. Holder	565 U.S. 302	2012	6–2	Substantive	Restoration of copyright in public domain works	Majority: Ginsburg; Dissent: Breyer (Alito)	Copyright Clause, Copyright Act of 1976, Uruguay Round Agreements Act	Constitution gives broad discretion to Congress to decide how best to promote the "progress of science and the useful arts", including restoring copyright in public domain works.
Kirtsaeng v. John Wiley & Sons, Inc. I	568 U.S. 519	2013	6–3	Substantive	First-sale doctrine	Majority: Breyer; Concurrence: Kagan (Alito); Dissent: Ginsburg (Scalia (in part), Kennedy)	Copyright Act of 1976	The first-sale doctrine applies to copyrighted works made lawfully overseas.
Petrella v. Metro-Goldwyn-Mayer, Inc.	572 U.S. 663	2014	6–3	Substantive	Laches	Majority: Ginsburg; Dissent: Breyer (Roberts, Kennedy)	Copyright Act of 1976	The laches defense is not available in copyright infringement cases.
American Broadcasting Cos., Inc. v. Aereo, Inc.	573 U.S. 431	2014	6–3	Substantive	Public performance	Majority: Breyer; Dissent: Scalia (Thomas, Alito)	Copyright Act of 1976	Aereo's subscription service allowed subscribers to view live and time-shifted streams of over-the-air television on Internet-connected devices; the live viewing was deemed to be an infringing "retransmission" within the meaning of the public performance right.
Kirtsaeng v. John Wiley & Sons, Inc. II	579 U.S. ___	2016	8–0	Procedural	Attorney's fees award	Majority: Kagan	Copyright Act of 1976	When deciding whether to award attorney's fees under the Copyright Act's fee-shifting provision, a district court should give substantial weight to the objective reasonableness of the losing party's position, while still taking into account all other circumstances relevant to granting fees. There is no particular presumption against awarding fees.
Star Athletica, LLC v. Varsity Brands, Inc.	580 U.S. ___	2017	6–2	Substantive	Useful art, Useful articles	Majority: Thomas; Concurrence: Ginsburg; Dissent: Breyer (Kennedy)	Copyright Act of 1976	Aesthetic design elements on useful articles like clothing can be copyrightable if they can be separately identified as art and exist independently of the useful article.
Fourth Estate Public Benefit Corp. v. Wall-Street.com	586 U.S. ___	2019	9-0	Procedural	Copyright registration	Majority: Ginsburg	Copyright Act of 1976	A copyright owner may not file an infringement suit until the Register of Copyrights has granted the application for registration.
Rimini Street Inc. v. Oracle USA Inc.	586 U.S. ___	2019	9-0	Substantive	Statutory damages for copyright infringement	Majority: Kavanaugh	Copyright Act of 1976, Fee Act of 1853	The Copyright Act’s award of "full costs" to a prevailing party in a copyright infringement claim is limited to six categories specified in the Fee Act of 1853 (the general costs statute).
Allen v. Cooper	589 U.S. ___	2020	9-0	Substantive	Sovereign immunity	Majority: Kagan; Concurrence: Thomas, Breyer (Ginsburg)	Copyright Remedy Clarification Act	Congress did not validly abrogate state sovereign immunity via the Copyright Remedy Clarification Act. Authors of original expression whose federal copyrights are infringed by States may not sue any state without its consent.
Georgia v. Public.Resource.Org, Inc.	589 U.S. ___	2020	5-4	Substantive	Copyrightability of laws	Majority: Roberts (Sotomayor, Kagan, Gorsuch, Kavanaugh); Dissent: Thomas (Alito, Breyer), Ginsburg (Breyer)	Copyright Act of 1976	Annotations to state law are ineligible for copyright.
Google v. Oracle	No. 18-956, 593 U.S. ___ (2021)	2021	6-2	Substantive	Software copyright, Fair use	Majority; Breyer (Roberts, Sotomayor, Kagan, Gorsuch, Kavanaugh); Dissent: Thomas (Alito)	Copyright Act of 1976	The copying of APIs can be fair use.
Unicolors, Inc. v. H&M Hennes & Mauritz, L.P.	589 U.S. ___	2022	6-3	Procedural	Copyright registration	Majority: Breyer (Roberts, Sotomayor, Kagan, Kavanaugh, Barrett); Dissent: Thomas (Alito, Gorsuch)	Copyright Act of 1976	Lack of either factual or legal knowledge can excuse an inaccuracy in a copyright registration.
Andy Warhol Foundation for the Visual Arts, Inc. v. Goldsmith	598 U.S. ___	2023	7–2	Substantive	Transformative use	Majority; Sotomayor; Dissent; Kagan	Copyright Act of 1976	An allegedly infringing secondary work must be significantly altered from the original to be considered transformative where both works are used commercially for substantially the same purpose; courts must consider the specific context of the use when evaluating claims of transformative use.
Warner Chappell Music, Inc. v. Nealy	601 U.S. ___	2023	7–2	Procedural	Statute of limitations	Majority; Kagan; Dissent; Gorsuch	Copyright Act of 1976	Assuming without deciding that the discovery rule applies to copyright, a copyright claim that is timely under the three-year statute of limitations may recover damages from infringements that occurred more than three years ago.

=== Forthcoming cases ===
As of August 2026, the Supreme Court has no copyright cases pending.

== Dissents to denials of certiorari ==
When the Court refuses to hear a case, justices are entitled to write dissents to that denial of certiorari.

Case	Citation	Year	Subject Matter	Dissenter(s)	Statute Interpreted	Question	Dissent Reason
Lee v. Runge	404 U.S. 887	1971	Copyrightability, Idea-expression divide	Douglas	Copyright Clause	Because Congress's power to create copyright and patent laws both come from the Copyright Clause, should they not both be judged by the same standard? Lee argued that the standard should be patents' "novelty" rather than copyright's "originality."	Many of the interests of copyrights and patent overlap, and the part of Copyright Clause specifying that Congress's laws must "promote the Progress of Science and useful Arts" is a limit on Congress's authority.
Data General Corp. v. Digidyne Corp.	473 U.S. 908	1985	Antitrust, Tying	White, Blackmun	Clayton Antitrust Act of 1914	What constitutes forcing power in the absence of a large share of the general market? Must market power over "locked in" customers be analyzed at the outset of the original decision to purchase? What effect should be given to the existence of a copyright or other legal monopoly in determining market power?	The situation raised a number of complexities in the issue of whether tying software and hardware using copyrights or patents is anti-competitive, and the precedents set by the lower court were based on specious details. For example, a lower court had essentially said flatly that tying arrangements were anti-competitive, but the Supreme Court had ruled otherwise in cases like Jefferson Parish Hospital District No. 2 v. Hyde. The issue was likely to become more important as the multi-billion dollar computer industry continued to grow, so it was better to address the problems sooner rather than later.
Harper v. Maverick Recording Co.	562 U.S. 1080	2010	Copyright infringement	Alito	Copyright Act of 1976, Berne Convention Implementation Act of 1988	Should the "inadvertent innocent infringer" defense to copyright infringement be eliminated for all Internet music downloading?	The "innocent infringer" defense, which lowers statutory minimum damages of copyright infringement from $750 to $200, was written in a time when copyright notices would be clearly affixed to physical media, which was part of the expectation in favor of the defense. A digital music MP3 file could not bear a human-readable copyright notice, so there was a strong argument for the defense. Moreover, the lower courts declined to take mitigating factors such as the 16-year-old Harper's age into consideration, and perhaps they should have.

== Further research ==
- Raza Panjwani, "Supreme Court Copyright Index"—A post listing Supreme Court copyright jurisprudence, organized by justice. Last updated in 2014.

== See also ==
- List of United States Supreme Court patent case law
- List of United States Supreme Court trademark case law
