= List of United States Supreme Court trademark case law =

This is an incomplete list of Supreme Court of the United States cases in the area of trademark law.

Case	Citation	Year	Vote	Classification	Subject Matter	Opinions	Statute Interpreted	Summary
Pre-Lanham Act Jurisprudence (effective July 6, 1947)
Delaware & Hudson Canal Co. v. Clark	80 U.S. 311	1871		Substantive	Geographic descriptors and generic terms	Majority: Strong	N/A	Geographical names designating the good's place of production (as opposed to the good's producer) cannot be trademarked.
Amoskeag Manufacturing Co. v. D. Trainer & Sons	101 U.S. 51	1879		Substantive	Quality Indicators	Majority: Field Dissent: Clifford	N/A	Words, letters, figures, or symbols indicating only the quality of a good cannot be trademarked.
McLean v. Fleming	96 U.S. 245	1877		Substantive	Likelihood of misleading; Laches	Majority: Clifford	Federal Trademark Act of 1870	Infringement requires a likelihood of misleading purchasers, not exact similitude; with laches, a court may deny past damages but still enjoin future infringement where infringement is clear.
In re Trade-Mark Cases	100 U.S. 82	1879	9–0	Substantive	Constitutional basis for trademark regulation	Majority: Miller (unanimous)	Federal Trademark Act of 1870	The Copyright Clause does not give Congress the power to regulate trademarks.
Liggett & Myers Tobacco Co. v. Finzer	128 U.S. 182	1888		Substantive	Similarity of marks; Likelihood of misleading	Majority: Field	N/A	Though both featuring stars, two marks for competing tobacco brands are so different that there is no possibility of misleading consumers.
Goodyear's Rubber Mfg. Co. v. Goodyear Rubber Co.	128 U.S. 598	1888		Substantive	Descriptive terms	Majority: Field	N/A	Names that describe a class of goods cannot be trademarked.
Menendez v. Holt	128 U.S. 514	1888		Substantive	Fanciful quality marks; Transference of goodwill; Laches	Majority: Fuller	N/A	A mark that indicates a brand's special selection of its goods using arbitrary terms is capable of trademark; trademark and goodwill are retained by the continuing company and not transferred to a partner departing from that company; delay in bringing infringement suit may preclude recovery for past damages, but not injunction against future injury.
Lawrence Manufacturing Co. v. Tennessee Manufacturing Co.	138 U.S. 537	1891		Substantive	Infringement	Majority: Fuller	N/A	Evidence that a defendant used a trademark with the intent to falsely represent his product and pass it off as the plaintiff's product is evidence of infringement.
Brown Chemical Co. v. Meyer et al.	139 U.S. 540	1891		Substantive	Infringement; Descriptive terms; Names as marks	Majority: Brown	N/A	Surnames cannot be trademarked, but neither can they be used to deceive the public; Infringement requires evidence of fraudulent intent.
Coats v. Merrick Thread Co.	149 U.S. 562	1893		Substantive	Infringement; Trade dress	Majority: Brown	N/A	When similarities between marks are due to design constraints and/ or have been tolerated within the industry, there is no infringement if defendant's other packaging and advertising sufficiently distinguishes the products.
Columbia Mill Co. v. Alcorn	150 U.S. 460	1893		Substantive	Geographic descriptors	Majority: Jackson	N/A	Geographical names and previously-appropriated words cannot be appropriated as an exclusive trademark
Singer Mfg. Co. v. June Mfg. Co.	163 U.S. 169	1896		Substantive	Generic terms; Unfair competition	Majority: White	N/A	The name of a patented article that comes to generically describe that article falls into the public domain upon expiration of the patent; but, it amounts to unfair competition when other parties mislead the public by suggesting that its product is manufactured by the patenting company.
Saxlehener v. Eisner & Mendelson Co.	179 U.S. 19	1900		Substantive	Abandonment; Laches; Trade dress	Majority: Brown	N/A	The abandonment defense requires evidence of both practical abandonment and intent to abandon; laches defeats a trademark owner's rights when he knew or should have known that others were using the mark, and failed to take action such that the name became generic to the whole class of products; trade dress that would mislead the casual customer constitutes infringement, and is not cured by uses of additional labels
Elgin Nat'l Watch Co. v. Illinois Watch Case Co.	179 U.S. 665	1901		Substantive; Procedural	Secondary meaning; Jurisdiction	Majority: Fuller	Trademark Act of 1881	Marks that cannot themselves be registered as trademarks but have achieved secondary meaning can still be protected from unfair competition; under the 1881 Act, circuit courts do not have jurisdiction over a dispute by two parties of the same state not involving a registrable trademark
Clinton E. Worden & Co. v. California Fig Syrup Co.	187 U.S. 516	1903		Substantive	Limitation on injunctions	Majority: Shiras; Dissent: McKenna	N/A	A mark that itself is intended to deceive the public deprives its owner of equitable relief (here, the product called "Syrup of Figs" was more accurately "Syrup of Senna," so plaintiff had no right to enjoin defendant from calling its product "Fig Syrup")
La Republique Francaise v. Saratoga Vichy Spring Co.	191 U.S. 427	1903		Substantive	Laches; Geographic descriptors	Majority: Brown	Industrial Property Treaty (1887)	A foreign government cannot invoke the rule of nullum tempus to answer a defense of laches, where the government's interest is merely nominal; A geographic mark that has become generic and is not used in a misleading manner by subsequent parties will not support injunction.
Howe Scale Co. of 1886 v. Wyckoff, Seamans & Benedict	198 U.S. 118	1905		Substantive	Names as marks	Majority: Fuller	N/A	Parties have the right to use their names in trade as an individual, a firm, and a corporation, except as cover for unfair competition.
A. Leschen & Sons Rope Co. v. Broderick & Bascom Rope Co.	201 U.S. 166	1906		Substantive	Trademark registration	Majority: Brown	Federal Trademark Act of 1870; Trademark Act of 1881	Description of a trademark must be sufficiently definite to qualify for registration.
E.C. Atkins & Co. v. Moore	212 U.S. 285	1909		Procedural	Reviewability of trademark decision	Majority: Fuller	Trademark Act of 1905	A court of appeals decision regarding trademark registration affirming the Commissioner of Patent's decision, and directing the clerk to certify its opinion to the Commissioner, is not final and appealable to the Supreme Court.
Standard Paint Co. v. Trinidad Asphalt Mfg. Co.	220 U.S. 446	1911		Substantive	Descriptive terms; Unfair competition	Majority: McKenna	Trademark Act of 1905	A descriptive mark is not trademarkable, even if it is not intended to accurately describe the product; There can be no claim of unfair competition against imitation of a descriptive mark, since acknowledging such a right would amount to granting a trademark to the descriptive mark.
Baglin v. Cusenier Co.	221 U.S. 580	1911		Substantive	Geographic terms; Abandonment	Majority: Hughes	Trademark Act of 1881	A non-trademarkable geographic indicator is not to be confused with other designations of origin (e.g., town in France vs. monastic order); The liquidator of physical assets has no claims to foreign trademarks; Abandonment requires evidence of practical abandonment and intent to abandon.
Thaddeus Davids Co. v. Davids	233 U.S. 461	1914		Substantive	Registration eligibility	Majority: Hughes	Trademark Act of 1905	Marks otherwise prohibited by the Act of 1905 (for example, surnames) can be registered if used exclusively for ten years preceding the act, per section 5 of that Act.
G. & C. Merriam Co. v. Syndicate Pub. Co.	237 U.S. 618	1915		Substantive	Registration eligibility; Generic terms	Majority: Day	Trademark Act of 1881	Under the Act of 1881, after a copyrighted work expires, the word used to designate that work falls into the public domain and cannot be trademarked (here, "Webster" could not be trademarked for dictionaries whose copyrights had already expired).
Hamilton-Brown Shoe Co. v. Wolf Bros. & Co.	240 U.S. 251	1916		Substantive	Damages	Majority: Pitney	§ 240, Judicial Code [36 Stat. at L. 1157, chap. 231]	Because of the impossibility of the task, a trademark owner does not have the responsibility of apportioning defendant's profits between those attributable to infringement and those attributable to the "intrinsic merit" of the defendant's product.
Hanover Star Milling Co. v. Metcalf	240 U.S. 403	1916		Substantive	Territorial extent of trademark rights	Majority: Pitney		A trademark owner who confines his trademark usage to a certain territory cannot enjoin use of that trademark by someone else who in good faith established extensive and continuous trade in another territory where the plaintiff trademark owner's product is unknown.
United Drug Co. v. Theodore Rectanus Co.	248 U.S. 90	Dec. 9, 1918		Substantive	Scope of trademark rights; Territorial extent of trademark rights	Majority: Pitney	Trademark Act of 1881	A trademark right is not a right in gross like statutory copyright or patent—the trademark right, being attached to a business or trade, does not permit a trademark owner to merely enforce negative rights; The adoption of a trademark does not, by itself, reserve right of protection to territories where the owner has not already extended her trade, even if she may desire to later.
Estate of P.D. Beckwith, Inc., v. Commissioner of Patents	252 U.S. 538	1920		Substantive	Registration eligibility	Majority: Clarke	Trademark Act of 1905	Despite the statutory prohibition against registering merely descriptive trademarks, a trademark featuring descriptive words along with other elements, such as non-descriptive words and a fanciful or arbitrary design, can be registered so long as the applicant disclaims any claim to the descriptive words except as they appear in the whole mark.
Coca-Cola Co. v. Koke Co. of America	254 U.S. 143	1920		Substantive	Secondary meaning	Majority: Holmes	Trademark Act of 1881; Trademark Act of 1905	A mark that develops secondary meaning in the marketplace retains trademark status and is protected against claims of unfair competition when, for example, a descriptive trademark no longer accurately describes the product due to a change in formulation.
Baldwin Co. v. R.S. Howard Co.	256 U.S. 35	1921		Procedural	Reviewability of trademark decisions	Majority: Day	Trademark Act of 1905	A Court of Appeals for the District of Columbia decision reversing the decision of the Commissioner of Patents is not a final judgment reviewable by the Supreme Court.
A. Bourjois & Co. v. Katzel	260 U.S. 689	Jan. 29, 1923		Substantive	Sale of trademark rights; Infringement	Majority: Holmes	Trademark Act of 1905	A foreign company who sells its business to and American buyer (including its registered trademarks and goodwill) cannot subsequently enter the US market and use its old trademarks.
American Steel Foundries v. Robertson	262 U.S. 209	May 21, 1923		Procedural	Remedies	Majority: Taft	Trademark Act of 1905; 35 U.S.C.A. §§ 145, 146	The Trademark Act of 1905 imports the rules of practice and procedure that govern appeals of patent applications, and so authorizes unsuccessful trademark applicants to obtain a remedy by bill in equity, as the Revised Statutes provide to unsuccessful patent applicants.
Prestonettes, Inc. v. Coty	264 U.S. 359	April 7, 1924		Substantive	Right to use	Majority: Holmes	Trademark Act of 1920	Trademark law does not protect against a distributor using a plaintiff's trademark on its own repackaged labels in order to communicate to buyers that the distributed goods contain plaintiff's products—trademark law only protects against misleading consumers and does not confer a sweeping right to prohibit all uses of a mark.
U.S. ex rel. Baldwin Co. v. Robertson	265 U.S. 168	1924		Procedural	Remedies; Right to appeal	Majority: Taft	Trademark Act of 1905; 35 U.S.C.A. §§ 145, 146	The Trademark Act of 1905 imports the rules of practice and procedure that govern appeals of patent applications, and so authorizes a trademark owner to bring a suit in equity following an unsuccessful trademark cancellation appeal; and under the Trademark Act, both parties to a trademark cancellation interference have the right to appeal a decision from the Commissioner of Patents to the District Court of Appeals.
William R. Warner & Co. v. Eli Lilly & Co.	265 U.S. 526	1924		Substantive	Descriptive terms; Unfair competition	Majority: Sutherland		A name which is descriptive of product ingredients, qualities, or other characteristics cannot be appropriated as a trademark; While a producer does not have exclusive rights to a product formula, a competitor using the same formula may not pass off its product as that of the first producer's.
American Steel Foundries v. Robertson	269 U.S. 372	1926		Substantive	Likelihood of confusion; Trade names	Majority: Sutherland	Trademark Act of 1905	Since trademark rights must flow from a connection with underlying business or trade, trademark adoption by one party does not necessarily preclude adoption of the same trademark by another party on other kinds of articles (until likelihood of confusion exists); A trademark applies to the commodity sold, while a trade name applies to the business and its good will.
Postum Cereal Co. v. California Fig Nut Co.	272 U.S. 693	1927		Procedural	Reviewability of trademark decision	Majority: Taft	Trademark Act of 1905; Trademark Act of 1920	A proceeding before the Court of Appeals of the District of Columbia to review an agency action of the Commissioner of Patents under the Act of 1905 was a purely administrative matter and not a "case" within the meaning of Article III of the Constitution. Thus, such a decision under the 1905 act was not subject to judicial review, and it did not matter whether the appeal structure was retained under the 1920 act.
U.S. Printing & Lithograph Co. v. Griggs, Cooper & Co.	279 U.S. 156	1929		Substantive	Territorial extent of trademark rights	Majority: Holmes	Trademark Act of 1905	The Trade-Mark Act cannot enjoin infringement occurring only intrastate; Common-law trademark rights to not extend to states where the mark has not been used.
Kellogg Co. v. National Biscuit Co.	305 U.S. 111	1938		Substantive	Secondary meaning	Majority: Brandeis	Trademark Act of 1905; Trademark Act of 1920	Once a patent has expired, the benefits of the invention are to be enjoyed by the public.
Armstrong Paint & Varnish Works v. Nu-Enamel Corp.	305 U.S. 315	1938		Substantive	Unfair competition	Majority: Reed	Trademark Act of 1905; Trademark Act of 1920	The invalidity of a registered trademark does not necessarily divest a federal court's jurisdiction over unfair competition claims; An established secondary meaning gives the term's owner a right against unfair competition at common law, apart from any trademark statutes.
Mishawaka Rubber & Woolen Mfg. Co. v. S.S. Kresge Co.	316 U.S. 203	May 4, 1942		Procedural	Damages	Majority: Frankfurter	Trademark Act of 1905	In calculating damages, the rightful trademark owner only bears the burden of proving the amount of infringer's sales bearing the trademark—the infringer bears the burden of decreasing the damage calculation by showing what portion of profits are attributable to factors other than use of the infringing mark.
Champion Spark Plug Co. v. Sanders	331 U.S. 125	April 28, 1947		Substantive	Second-hand use	Majority: Douglas	Trademark Act of 1905	A party who reconditions a trademarked product is entitled to keep the original trademark on the product, so long as the reconditioned product is marked as reconditioned and the party is not otherwise defrauding the market.
Post-Lanham Act Jurisprudence (effective July 6, 1947)
Steele v. Bulova Watch Co.	344 U.S. 280	1952		Procedural	Jurisdiction in foreign commerce	Majority: Clark	Lanham Act	US federal courts have jurisdiction over an action initiated by an American company, against an American citizen infringing on that company's trademark rights, if the citizen's operations and their effects are not confined within the territorial limits of a foreign country.
Dairy Queen, Inc. v. Wood	369 U.S. 469	April 30, 1962	7–0	Procedural	Right to jury	Majority: Black	N/A	A jury is competent to decide the legal issue of damages stemming from breach of contract or trademark infringement, so long as the accounts between the parties are not so complicated that only acourt of equity could untangle such accounts.
Sears, Roebuck & Co. v. Stiffel Co.	376 U.S. 225	March 9, 1964	9–0	Substantive	Unfair competition	Majority: Black	N/A	States may regulate that goods, whether patented or not, be labeled to prevent misleading customers as to the source of the goods, just as states may regulate the use of trademarks.
Compco Corp. v. Day-Brite Lighting, Inc.	376 U.S. 234	March 9, 1964	9–0	Substantive	Unfair competition	Majority: Black	N/A	Federal patent laws do not preclude states from making statutory or common law that requires product makers to take precautions to identify the source of their products.
Fleischmann Distilling Corp. v. Maier Brewing Co.	386 U.S. 714	1967	8–1	Procedural	Recovery	Majority: Warren	Lanham Act	The Lanham Act specifies available compensatory remedies, and they do not include attorney's fees; furthermore, attorney's fees are generally not recoverable without statutory or contractual provisions.
United States v. Sealy, Inc.	388 U.S. 350	1967	6–1	Non-trademark	Anti-trust	Majority: Fortas	Sherman Antitrust Act	Exclusive territorial trademark licenses can still run afoul of antitrust laws if they are a part of unlawful price-fixing and policing.
Inwood Laboratories, Inc. v. Ives Laboratories, Inc.	456 U.S. 844	1982	9–0	Substantive	Contributory Liability	Majority: O'Connor	Lanham Act	A manufacturer or distributor who intentionally induces a party to infringe a trademark, or contributes to an infringing good or service while knowing or having reason to know of the infringement, is contributorily liable for that infringement.
Park 'N Fly, Inc. v. Dollar Park & Fly, Inc.	469 U.S. 189	1985	8–1	Substantive	Generic terms; Descriptive terms; Incontestability	Majority: O'Connor	Lanham Act	A generic term (which refers to a genus, of which a particular product is a species) is not registrable as a trademark, and a registered mark that becomes generic may be cancelled at any time; A descriptive mark describes qualities or characteristics of a good or service, and can only be registered if it has acquired secondary meaning; The Lanham Act does not permit an incontestable mark to be challenged as descriptive.
San Francisco Arts & Athletics, Inc. v. United States Olympic Committee	483 U.S. 522	1987	5–4	Substantive	"Olympic" trademark	Majority: Powell	Lanham Act; Amateur Sports Act of 1978	The Amateur Sports Act grants the US Olympic Committee unique trademark protections and does not preclude uses of the mark only when there is potential for confusion; "Olympic" is not a generic word; The First Amendment is not a bar to Congress granting exclusive rights to use the word "Olympic."
K Mart Corp. v. Cartier, Inc.	485 U.S. 176	1988	5–4	Non-Trademark	Trademarks; Conflicting import laws	Majority: Kennedy	1930 Tariff Act; Customs Service Regulation	A Customs Service regulation, which permits the importation of foreign-made goods bearing an authorized US trademark, conflicts with the Tariff Act, which prohibits the importation of any such goods without the consent of the trademark owner.
Two Pesos, Inc. v. Taco Cabana, Inc.	505 U.S. 763	1992	9–0	Substantive	Trade dress; Secondary meaning	Majority: White	Lanham Act	Trade dress is capable of identifying the source of a good or service, so inherently distinctive trade dress is protectable under the Lanham Act without showing the trade dress has acquired secondary meaning.
Qualitex Co. v. Jacobson Products Co., Inc.	514 U.S. 159	1995	9–0	Substantive	Trade dress; Functionality	Majority: Breyer	Lanham Act	A product feature that is functional ("essential to use or purpose of article" or "essential to use or purpose of article") cannot be trademarked if doing so would significantly disadvantage competitors (on non-reputation grounds); Color can be trademarked if it develops secondary meaning and serves no other function; Where color serves a significant non-trademark function, courts will examine if granting exclusive rights over that color will interfere with legitimate competition.
College Savings Bank v. Florida Prepaid Postsecondary Education Expense Board	527 U.S. 666	1999	5–4	Non-Trademark	Sovereign immunity	Majority: Scalia	Lanham Act; Trademark Remedy Clarification Act	State school did not waive its 11th Amendment immunity from suits under the Lanham Act when it sold and advertised for-profit educational materials in interestate commerce, even after being put on notice that it would be subject to Lanham Act Liability by doing so per the Trademark Remedy Clarification Act.
Wal-Mart Stores, Inc. v. Samara Brothers, Inc.	529 U.S. 205	2000	9–0	Substantive	Trade dress; Secondary meaning	Majority: Scalia	Lanham Act	While trade dress (product design) is not inherently distinctive, it is entitled to protection under the Lanham Act upon proof of acquiring secondary meaning (when it becomes a source identifier).
Cooper Industries v. Leatherman Tool Group	532 U.S. 424	2001	8–1	Non-Trademark	Punitive damages	Majority: Stevens		Because a jury's punitive damage award is "an expression of moral condemnation" rather than a finding of fact, circuit courts should review de novo district courts' determinations regarding the constitutionality of those awards.
TrafFix Devices, Inc. v. Marketing Displays, Inc.	532 U.S. 23	2001	9–0	Substantive	Trade dress; Secondary meaning; Functionality	Majority: Kennedy	Lanham Act	When product design and packaging acquires a secondary meaning, it is protected as trade dress and competitors are prevented from using it in a manner likely to confuse the public—however, functional features are not granted trade dress protection; Competitive necessity is not necessarily a test for functionality—rather, a feature is functional when it is "essential to the use or purpose of the article or [] it affects the cost or quality of the article."
Dastar Corp. v. Twentieth Century Fox Film Corp.	539 U.S. 23	2003	8–0	Substantive	Intersection of trademark law with public domain works; Passing off	Majority: Scalia	Lanham Act	Trademark cannot preserve copyright-like rights to a public domain work. The Lanham Act prohibits both "passing off" (misrepresenting one's own goods or services as someone else's) and "reverse passing off" (misrepresenting someone else's goods as one's own); "false designation of origin" in the Lanham Act only refers to the producer of the tangible good, and not the person or entity who conceived the ideas comprising that good (e.g., the "origin" of a video tape is the producer of the tape, not the creators or artists who created the underlying material—whose rights are separately protected by copyright, not trademark law).
Moseley v. V Secret Catalogue, Inc.	537 U.S. 418	2003	9–0	Substantive	Trademark dilution	Majority: Stevens	Lanham Act, Federal Trademark Dilution Act	Statutory dilution occurs when a junior user's mark creates in consumers a mental association with a famous mark that reduces the capacity of the famous mark to identify the goods of its owner; Plaintiff must prove actual dilution under the Federal Trademark Dilution Act (later overturned by Trademark Dilution Revision Act of 2006), and not merely likelihood of dilution, for injunctive relief.
KP Permanent Make-Up, Inc. v. Lasting Impression I, Inc.	543 U.S. 111	2004	9–0	Substantive	Fair use; Likelihood of confusion	Majority: Souter	Lanham Act	A defendant claiming fair use of a trademark does not have the burden of showing its use is not likely to cause confusion; Some consumer confusion regarding the origin of the goods or services is compatible with the fair use of a trademark.
American Needle, Inc. v. NFL	560 U.S. 183	2010	9–0	Non-Trademark	Antitrust	Majority: Stevens	Sherman Antitrust Act	NFL teams forming an association for licensing their intellectual property (trademarked names, logos) are capable of conspiring under the Sherman Act.
United States v. Alvarez	567 U.S. 709	2012	6–3	Non-Trademark	First Amendment	Majority: Breyer	Stolen Valor Act	The Stolen Valor Act, which criminalizes falsely claiming the receipt of military decorations or medals, infringes on free speech protected by the First Amendment. There are other laws that restrict speech, like the Lanham Act—but prohibiting trademark infringement focuses on commercial speech, and requires showing likelihood of confusion before such speech is restricted.
Already, LLC v. Nike, Inc.	568 U.S. 85	Jan. 9, 2013	9–0	Procedural	Mootness; Infringement; Invalidation	Majority: Roberts	Lanham Act; Federal Trademark Dilution Act	A plaintiff's covenant not to sue over trademark infringement moots the defendant's counterclaim that the trademark is invalid.
Lexmark Int'l v. Static Control Components	572 U.S. 118	March 25, 2014	9–0	Procedural	False advertising; Standing	Majority: Scalia	Lanham Act	Standing to maintain a false advertising action under the Lanham Act is determined by a test which considers both zones of interest and proximate causation.
Pom Wonderful v. Coca-Cola, Inc.	572 U.S. 102	June 12, 2014	8–0	Procedural	False advertising; Private right of action	Majority: Kennedy	Lanham Act; Food Drug Cosmetic Act	Plaintiffs may bring false advertising claims under the Lanham Act to challenge food and beverage labels that are also regulated by the FDCA.
Hana Financial, Inc. v. Hana Bank	574 U.S. ___, 135 S.Ct. 907	Jan. 21, 2015	9–0	Procedural	Tacking	Majority: Sotomayor	Lanham Act	Whether two trademarks may be "tacked" (that is, when a new mark takes on the priority position of an older mark) is a jury question, since tacking is permissible when the original and the revised marks "create the same, continuing commercial impression so that consumers consider both as the same mark," which is a question of fact.
B&B Hardware, Inc. v. Hargis Industries, Inc.	___ U.S. ____, 135 S.Ct. 1293	March 24, 2015	7–2	Procedural & Substantive	Issue preclusion; Likelihood of confusion	Majority: Alito	Lanham Act	The Trademark Trial and Appeal Board's decision on an issue triggers issue preclusion for a district court's judgment when the district court decides an issue overlapping with the TTAB's analysis of a registration application, and the Lanham Act does not bar such preclusive effect.
Matal v. Tam	582 U. S. ____	June 19, 2017	8–0	Substantive	Lanham Act's Disparagement Clause	Majority: Alito	Lanham Act	The Lanham Act's disparagement clause (§1052(a)) is facially unconstitutional under the First Amendment's Free Speech Clause; Trademark registration does not constitute government speech.
Iancu v. Brunetti		2019						
Romag Fasteners, Inc. v. Fossil, Inc.		2020						
Lucky Brand Dungarees Inc. v. Marcel Fashions Group Inc.		2020						
Patent and Trademark Office v. Booking.com B. V.		2020						
Jack Daniel's Properties, Inc. v. VIP Products LLC		2023						
Abitron Austria GmbH v. Hetronic International, Inc.		2023						

== See also ==
- List of trademark case law
- List of United States Supreme Court copyright case law
- List of United States Supreme Court patent case law
