= Criminal copyright law in the United States =

Criminal copyright law in the U.S. penalizes willful, large-scale, or commercial infringement, acts usually defined as the willful, unauthorized reproduction or distribution of copyrighted works for commercial advantage, private financial gain.

It began in 1897 as a narrowly defined misdemeanor for willful, for-profit infringement of musical and dramatic works. Eventually turning into a significant felony regime, particularly after the Copyright Act of 1976.

Infringements of this type are divided between being either civil or criminal, with civil law handling most small-scales disputes and the U.S. government (more specifically the DOJ) pursuing criminal charges against large-scale infringers.

== History ==
In 1787, the Founding Fathers of the United States wrote the Copyright Clause into the U.S. Constitution, which granted the United States Congress the power, “[t]o promote the Progress of Science and useful Arts, by securing for limited Times to Authors and Inventors the exclusive Right to their respective Writings and Discoveries.” Copyright grants a limited monopoly to authors over the production and dissemination of their creative expression to incentivize further creative production. Protection is constitutionally limited in duration and scope to prevent detrimental monopolies on culture. The copyright protection written into the Constitution was first enacted in the Copyright Act of 1790, which granted national protection to American authors for 14 years, with one optional 14-year renewal. Copyright remained comparatively limited for around a hundred years, and infringement remained a civil infraction. The Supreme Court has, in the past, interpreted this as establishing that copyright was not a natural law property right, but rather a limited statutory monopoly granted by Congress.

The first criminal provision in U.S. copyright law was added in 1897, which established a misdemeanor penalty for “unlawful performances and representations of copyrighted dramatic and musical compositions” if the violation had been “willful and for profit.” The length of protection has been increasing since the Copyright Act of 1909, which extended the term of copyright to 28 years with an optional 28-year extension. At present, copyright protection lasts for the author's life plus 70 years or, in the case of anonymous works and works-for-hire, for 95 years from the date of publication or 120 from the year of creation, whichever expires first.

== Legal definition ==
Criminal copyright infringement typically requires that the infringer acted "for the purpose of commercial advantage or private financial gain." 17 U.S.C. § 506(a). To establish criminal liability, the prosecutor must first show the basic elements of copyright infringement: ownership of a valid copyright, and the violation of one or more of the copyright holder's exclusive rights. The government must then establish that the defendant willfully infringed or, in other words, possessed the necessary mens rea. Misdemeanor infringement has a very low threshold in terms of number of copies and the value of the infringed works.

An individual may be liable if the infringement was committed: (B) by the reproduction or distribution, including by electronic means, during any 180-day period, of 1 or more copies or phonorecords of 1 or more copyrighted works, which have a total retail value of more than $1,000; or (C) by the distribution of a work being prepared for commercial distribution, by making it available on a computer network accessible to members of the public, if such person knew or should have known that the work was intended for commercial distribution. 17 U.S.C. § 506(a)(1).

Felony copyright infringement has a slightly higher threshold and possibly serious penalties. 18 U.S.C. § 2319(b). (1) shall be imprisoned not more than 5 years, or fined in the amount set forth in this title, or both, if the offense consists of the reproduction or distribution, including by electronic means, during any 180-day period, of at least 10 copies or phonorecords, of 1 or more copyrighted works, which have a total retail value of more than $2,500; (2) shall be imprisoned not more than 10 years, or fined in the amount set forth in this title, or both, if the offense is a felony and is a second or subsequent offense.

Without establishing the threshold value, legitimate infringement, or the requisite state of mind, there can be no criminal liability. If the defendant can show they had a legitimate copy or use – such as through the first-sale doctrine or the fair use doctrine – then the burden of proof falls on the government.

== Civil vs. criminal copyright infringement ==
Violation of the copyright holder's exclusive rights can trigger civil, or possibly criminal, penalties. Statutory interpretations of criminal liability provisions have historically been more narrowly construed than those assigning civil penalties. Modern copyright provisions address both criminal and civil liability, as well as addressing the interests of both copyright holders and the public, though the reconceptualization of infringement as theft has led to a gradual worsening of criminal penalties. While the legislative history states that “[i]n cases where civil liability is unclear – whether because the law is unsettled, or because a legitimate business dispute exists – the Committee does not intend to establish criminal liability” there remains a high degree of uncertainty in these cases.

There are three levels of civil copyright infringement: civil infringers may be “innocent”, “ordinary”, or “willful”. There is a range of penalties which can be imposed on criminal infringers depending on the egregiousness of the offense and in deference to prosecutorial discretion. Innocent infringers are those who are “not aware and had no reason to believe that his or her acts constituted infringement of copyright,” which implies that some degree of negligence or knowledge is required for ordinary civil infringement. Willful infringement, by extension, requires a higher degree of culpability. The degree of knowledge or “willfulness” required for civil liability for copyright infringement is rather low and undefined. No knowledge or intent is strictly necessary for a finding of civil infringement, insofar as it is a strict liability offense. While in certain cases there are indications that willful infringement in a civil suit requires some knowledge that the defendant knew that, “[h]is actions constituted copyright infringement or acted with a reckless disregard for the copyright holder’s rights,” this position is disputed and some Circuits merely require the infringement is “knowing” to warrant an aggravated penalty for the defendant.

== Policy ==
The regulatory proclivity to restrict access to copyrighted material has built up over time. There has been a continual increase in number of cases pursued and the seriousness of the penalties imposed by the U.S. government, which has recently announced its intention to prioritize criminal prosecution of copyright infringers. The civil statute imposes strict liability for infringement and high statutory damages while a wide range of behaviors could fall under the criminal statutes. The conflation of the lower civil thresholds with criminal penalties is more likely where there is no clear guidance, as with legislators trusting the courts to interpret “willfulness” in criminal copyright infringement proceedings, and in instances where the government has explicitly designated resources toward prosecuting a given crime.

Statutory inflation is common where courts are given uncertain or differing standards for violation of a statute which is both remedial and penal, where courts defer to legislators, and legislators write broad laws trusting to judicial restraint to restrict them from being applied to small actors. While under other circumstances prosecutorial discretion might have proven a reliable protection against spurious prosecutions, the expansive writing the criminal copyright statute has allowed for the inclusion of small actors within the purview of criminal copyright law. When prosecutors within the Department of Justice are charged with bringing criminal infringement cases, they are more likely to pursue otherwise marginal cases and look for the courts to interpret the law as expansively as it is written.

== See also ==
- Copyright law of the United States
