= Werkmeister =

Werkmeister (German for "foreman" or "master workman") is a German surname. Notable people with the surname include:

- Benedikt Maria Leonhard von Werkmeister (1745–1823), German Roman Catholic theologian, librarian and writer
- Matthew Werkmeister (born 1992), Australian stage and television actor
- William H. Werkmeister (1901–1993), German-born American philosopher

== See also ==
- Andreas Werckmeister (1645–1706), German organist, music theorist and composer
- Hans Werckmeister (1871–1929), German film director
- American Lithographic Co. v. Werkmeister, a United States Supreme Court case (1911)
