= Bong v. Campbell Art Co. =

- Supreme Court of the United States

Argued April 15, 1909 Decided May 24, 1909
- Full case name: Bong v. Campbell Art Co.
- Citations: 214 U.S. 236 (more) 29 S. Ct. 628; 53 L. Ed. 979

Holding
- A copyright cannot be granted to a non-citizen whose country has not been acknowledged as in a reciprocal copyright arrangement with the United States by a formal presidential proclamation. Because the non-citizen is not granted a copyright, they cannot assign a copyright for a work to a citizen of a country with American copyright privileges. That citizen cannot register a copyright for the work.

Court membership
- Chief Justice Melville Fuller Associate Justices John M. Harlan · David J. Brewer; Edward D. White · Rufus W. Peckham; Joseph McKenna · Oliver W. Holmes Jr. William R. Day · William H. Moody

Laws applied
- International Copyright Act of 1891

Bong v. Campbell Art Co., 214 U.S. 236 (1909), was a United States Supreme Court case in which the Court held, under the International Copyright Act of 1891, A copyright cannot be granted to a non-citizen whose country has not been acknowledged as in a reciprocal copyright arrangement with the United States by a formal presidential proclamation. Because the non-citizen is not granted a copyright, they cannot assign a copyright for a work to a citizen of a country with American copyright privileges. That citizen cannot register a copyright for the work.

The case concerned the painting "Dolce Far Niente" by Daniel Hernández Morillo, a citizen of Peru. Because Peru had not entered into a mutual copyright arrangement with the United States, Hernández gave the painting to a German man named Bong. Germany had entered into such an arrangement with the United States in 1892, so Bong applied for a copyright on the painting in 1902. He wrote "Copyright by Rich. Bong" on the painting to comply with the notice requirement.

Alfred S. Campbell Art Company printed 1000 copies of the painting, retitled as "Sunbeam", with the copyright notice and attributing it to Hernández. Bong sued for copyright infringement. At one point, he asserted that Hernández was Spanish because Spain had copyright relations with the United States. He also contented that the copyright should be valid because both Peru and the United States were part of the Montevideo Union, an international copyright arrangement.

The Court determined that the copyright originates with the original creator, in this case Hernández. Because Hernández's citizenship mean that his works were ineligible for United States copyrights, he could not assign a right he did not possess to Bong. Bong's copyright was thus void and the painting was in the public domain when Campbell Art Company made its copies.

Additionally, the Court said that the proclamation from the president was required for a country's citizens to apply for American copyrights. The United States' membership in the Montevideo Union was not sufficient without the explicit proclamation.

The Court cited heavily from American Tobacco Co. v. Werckmeister.
