= Obituary piracy =

Unauthorised copying of online obituaries

Obituary piracy or obit piracy is the unauthorised copying or re-fabrication of online obituaries that have previously been published elsewhere in order to generate revenue.

The obituaries used by obituary pirates are often lifted from funeral home websites, local newspapers, and legitimate obituary publishers such as Legacy.com. Obituary pirating has in some cases involved simply copying the text and images used in the original obituaries, which has been classified as copyright infringement. However, other sites create summaries of the obituaries to avoid this charge, often using generative artificial intelligence to do so. The websites engaging in this practice then place online advertising, ask for donations, and claim to sell memorial products such as flowers next to the obituaries, taking in revenue from the unwitting friends and family of the deceased. They use search engine optimization to maximise their reach in search results.

== Background ==
In the 2000s and 2010s, obituaries became more valuable as commodities due to their ability to attract web traffic. The COVID-19 pandemic accelerated this change. In 2020, the websites of Service Corporation International (SCI), a conglomerate which owned 1,500 funeral homes, attracted nearly 160 million visitors, an increase from 130 million in 2019.

In 2021, Barbara Kemmis, executive director for the Cremation Association of North America, said that reports of obituary piracy were on the rise.

== Examples ==
=== Pascal Leclerc ===
In January 2018, the website Afterlife, owned by Pascal Leclerc, was sued by Newfoundland lawyer Erin Best on behalf of clients Dawn Thomson and Raylene Manning-Puddister in Federal Court in Ottawa. Manning-Puddister had found an obituary she had written in 2012 for her son Tyller Pittman on the Afterlife website with no changes from its original state, including pictures and a poem she had written. Similarly, Thomson had found an obituary for her father, who had died in 2017, on the Afterlife website a year later, copied and pasted from elsewhere. Afterlife was selling memorial-themed products like candles and sympathy cards for unwitting friends and family to buy, and taking in the revenue for itself. Leclerc initially hired a lawyer, but later backed down. Justice Catherine Kane thus issued a default judgment in 2019, ordering Afterlife to pay CA$10 million in statutory damages and the same amount in aggravated damages, and issuing an injunction against the website to prevent it from operating in the future. At the time it was taken down, the site had posted over 1 million Canadian obituaries. After this, the site redirected to Everhere, another site run by Leclerc.

Everhere, which described itself as a "database of obituaries that are found online", received controversy itself after it posted unauthorised obituaries for 12 of the 16 people who were killed in the Humboldt Broncos bus crash. Many of the obituaries were inaccurate, and had an incorrect place of death. The site placed advertisements next to the obituaries, charging $4.99 to remove them, as well as adding offers to purchase gifts and memorials.

In February 2018, a month after the filing of the Afterlife lawsuit, Leclerc started Echovita, a Quebec-based company, stating that he would "prove with a new business model that [he was] trying to help society." Echovita does not copy obituaries directly, instead crawling the internet for obituaries and publishing summaries, and as such does not fall into the realm of copyright infringement for which Afterlife was sued. The company generated CA$5 million in revenue in 2020, including commissions on floral, candle, and memorial tree sales. Echovita has also been accused of engaging in obituary piracy. In July 2021, Service Corporation International (SCI), a conglomerate which owned 1,500 funeral homes, sued Echovita, alleging that the company had scraped details from obituaries on SCI's website and republished them as their own. A spokesperson for SCI wrote that "Mining people’s personal data—at the lowest point in their lives—is disappointing." Leclerc has argued that "In reality, the funeral homes should never be the owner of an obituary," and that "The obituary’s purpose is to share the information with the public."

=== On YouTube ===
There are several YouTube channels that make use of similar tactics in order to turn a profit on the video sharing website. The videos may encourage users to subscribe to their channels before reading out the obituary, and they are often preceded by video advertisements. Some of the channels upload dozens of death notice summaries per hour, while the busiest channels upload new videos every few minutes. The aesthetics of the videos can include men sitting alone and speaking directly to the camera, whereas others narration of the obituaries over slideshows of candles and photos of the deceased sourced from social media. Wired reported that the highest subscriber count it found for one of these channels was slightly over 26,000 and the highest viewer count was 1.7 million, and that on the higher end the channels had a few thousand subscribers and millions of total views. These videos can feature product promotion in their descriptions, as well as lists of keywords for search engine optimization, such as "death," "cause of death," "die," "RIP," and "what happened."

=== Other instances ===
The death of 19-year-old Matteo Sachman on the New York City Subway on New Year's Eve in 2023 led to a significant increase in Google searches for Sachman's name alongside words such as "obituary", "accident", and "death". This uptick was detected on Google Trends by Indian internet marketer Faisal Shah Khan, owner of website FSK Hub, and others. Khan used information such as Sachman's LinkedIn page to construct a biography using a large language model. FSK Hub was the first site identified by The New York Times to have posted material about Sachman's death, and this was followed by numerous unauthorised obituaries, including poorly written news articles, YouTube videos, and incorrect obituaries within 24 hours, many before any official announcements or news stories. Lesser falsities included the claim that he was 29 years old, and that he was from Nantucket despite him being from New York. By 2 January, obituaries began publishing the false claim that he had been stabbed to death in a Bronx subway station, despite the fact that he was actually killed by a train after falling onto the tracks at the East Broadway stop in Manhattan; this false claim was taken from an unrelated CBS News article about an unnamed 29-year-old man who was attacked on a subway platform in the Bronx. YouTube videos about Sachman were filmed on busy streets or inside living rooms, and their narrators spoke in English, Urdu or other languages. The videos and most of the websites used ads from Google. The Sachmans, who had wanted to divulge information slowly, had a paid obituary published in The New York Times on January 5, 2024.

Later in 2024, Los Angeles Times journalist Deborah Vankin found that obituary pirates had published an obituary titled "Arts And Culture Writer At Los Angeles Times Sadly Passed Away", despite her still being alive.
