= Unconstitutional trademark acts =

United States trademark laws held unconstitutional

The United States justified its original attempt at establishing federal trademarks by pointing to the Copyright Clause in the Constitution. The Trade Mark Act of 1870 (within the Copyright Act of 1870) and the Trade Mark Act of 1876 were tested in a series of United States Supreme Court cases, called the Trade-Mark Cases, and ruled unconstitutional because that clause did not cover trademarks.

Before being ruled unconstitutional, they were the subjects of other Supreme Court cases: Delaware & Hudson Canal Co. v. Clark, Amoskeag Manufacturing Co. v. D. Trainer & Sons, and McLean v. Fleming.

The Trade Mark Act of 1881, instead, justified its authority under the Commerce Clause.

== History ==
The earliest known reference to a federal trademark law occurred in 1791, when the Secretary of State, Thomas Jefferson, drafted a letter recommending that the United States adopt federal trademark law. In the letter, Jefferson recommended that manufacturers should be entitled to register trademarks with their local U.S. federal district court, when said trademarks was used in interstate commerce. Nevertheless, a federal trademark statute did not develop for decades.

Until 1870, trademark law was left entirely up to the states. While these state statutory protections for trademarks were deemed as sufficient, there were still those that felt that further protection was needed on a federal level. Many lobbyists began suggesting the need for a federal trademark bill; however, there was never a consensus on what constitutional basis a potential federal statute should be based upon. Accordingly, all attempts across the decade to create a federal trademark statute were deemed to be unconstitutional.

Finally on April 14, 1870, a federal trademark bill was approved in Congress. This was ultimately deemed necessary, because over the previous decade Congress had approached international treaties pertaining to trademark law differently than the domestic approach. Congress had been approving international treaties that granted trademark rights for people of certain other countries on a US federal level. Through the treaties, foreign trademarks could be registered at the United States Patent Office and the federal entities were granted federal trademark protection, despite there not being designated central registration at the time. Congress chose to enact the 1870 Act to fill this gap and "to revise, consolidate, and amend the Statutes relating to Patents and Copyrights" through its enumerated powers under the Patents and Copyrights Clause.

=== Legislation ===
==== Trade Mark Act of 1870 ====
The Trade Mark Act of 1870 was the first federal trademark statute passed by Congress. This act was added as a section to a larger intellectual property bill that revised copyright and patent laws. The act allowed for registration of trademarks for use in interstate and foreign commerce. In the vein of the international treaties, the statute aimed to address the growing need for standardized trademark protection across state lines in response to the increasing commercial activity following the Civil War. The bill was introduced by Rhode Island Representative Thomas Jenckes, who believed that the bill would allow a trademark holder to "register his claim at the Patent Office, pay his fee, and take his certificate of registration, [which] will protect him throughout the United States, in the same way as a patent for a design or a copyright is protected."

Thus this new legislation allowed individuals and businesses to register their trademarks with the U.S. Patent Office while being provided with exclusive rights to use their trademarks in interstate commerce. The statute also outlined procedures for registration and enforcement, establishing a framework for the protection of intellectual property that would lay the groundwork for future trademark laws in the United States.

==== Trade Mark Act of 1876 ====
In 1876, in an effort to bolster the existing trademark protections under United States law, an amendment bill was introduced that proposed more stringent criminal penalties for trademark infringement in order to address what appeared to be inadequacies in the 1870 Act to deter trademark piracy. This bill was heavily lobbied for by merchants across the country who argued that "the evils and injuries to long-suffering commercial and manufacturing interests … imperatively demand[ed] prompt relief" The bill issued criminal penalties for trademark infringement that including fines and potentially lengthy prison sentences.

Concerns regarding the 1876 Act's strict penalties brought into question the legitimacy of the original 1870 Act. Critics of the acts argued that the law was exploited by businesses to disadvantage competitors by prompting investigations based on even minor accusations of wrongdoing. On the heels of these criticisms, questions began to arise about the constitutionality of even the 1870 Act.

== Cases ==
Prior to the 1870 Act being deemed unconstitutional, multiple trademark cases were heard by the Supreme Court.

In Delaware & Hudson Canal Co. v. Clark, the United States Supreme Court affirmed the dismissal of a trademark infringement action by holding that a party could exclusive trademark rights over the words "Lackawanna Coal". The Court deemed this phrase to be merely descriptive of the region in which the coal was produced and could have been employed as a factual statement by others. Therefore, by advertising and selling coal brought from the Lackawanna area as Lackawanna coal, the Defendant in the case did not invade any legally protected right belonging to the trademark owner.

In Mclean v. Fleming, a manufacturer of liver pills, brought a trademark infringement action against a rival manufacturer charging trademark infringement and requested an injunction and money damages to recover lost profit. The defendant manufacturer had used labels that were similar to those used by the complaining manufactuer. The Court determined that the similarity was sufficient, the Court concluded that the labels would convey a false impression to the public and mislead an ordinary purchaser. The Court determined that the injunction was properly granted to prevent future infringement.

=== Unconstitutionality ===
In 1879, the Supreme Court delivered its decision in the Trade Mark Cases, which collectively addressed the constitutionality of the 1870 Act. The Court's ruling was fundamentally rooted in its interpretation of the Commerce Clause and the limited scope of federal power it permitted. The justices argued that trademarks did not constitute "commerce" in the way the framers of the Constitution had envisioned, and thus, regulating them did not fall within the federal government's jurisdiction. This interpretation underscored the belief that trademarks were more closely related to property rights under state law rather than to the type of regulation of interstate commerce that would be under the federal purview.

The Court also examined the Copyright Clause as a potential source of federal authority over trademarks but concluded that trademarks, unlike copyrights, do not represent original works of authorship. The Court maintained that the primary purpose of a trademark was to identify the source of goods, rather than to be the type of expression that can receive protection under copyright law. The Court emphasized this distinction in holding that the protections provided by the Copyright Clause was not applicable to trademarks, thereby negating another possible constitutional basis for the 1870 Act. By ruling the 1870 Act unconstitutional, the Court reinforced the principle that federal intervention should be limited to areas explicitly outlined in the Constitution, with other matters left to the states.

The impact of the Trade Mark Cases was significant, sending a clear message to Congress about the limits of its powers and the need for a more nuanced approach to trademark legislation. It prompted a re-evaluation of how to effectively protect trademarks within the constitutional framework, leading to the eventual development of the Lanham Act in 1946. This act established a comprehensive system for trademark registration and protection that addressed the constitutional shortcomings identified in the Trade Mark Cases, laying the foundation for modern trademark law in the United States.
