= Bilateral copyright agreements of the United States =

Bilateral copyright agreements of the United States are agreements between the United States and another country which allow U.S. authors to claim copyright protection in the other country and authors from that country to claim protection under United States copyright law.

The agreements can take one of two forms with respect to the United States:

- An exchange of notes, which is given effect in U.S. law by a presidential proclamation under
  - International Copyright Act of 1891 (March 3, 1891, 26 Stat. 1106)
  - Copyright Act of 1909 (March 4, 1909, 35 Stat. 1075), later Title 17 of the United States Code
  - Act of December 18, 1919 (41 Stat. 368), which extended the period of time available to complete copyright formalities in the U.S. to take account of World War I
  - Act of September 25, 1941 (55 Stat. 732), which extended the period of time available to complete copyright formalities in the U.S. to take account of World War II
  - Copyright Act of 1976, which completely restated Title 17, notably 17 U.S.C. 104(b)(6)
  - Uruguay Round Agreements Act (Pub. L. 103–465, 108 Stat. 4809), codified as 17 U.S.C. 104A(g), which deals with restored copyrights
- A treaty ratified by the United States Senate, which has direct effect under
  - Copyright Act of 1909
  - Copyright Act of 1976 (17 U.S.C. 104(b) and 104A)

Treaties which deal only with copyright matters are usually known as "conventions": however, certain other treaties (e.g., peace treaties) also contain provisions concerning copyright.

== Countries affected ==
It is impossible to give a definitive list of countries which are affected by the proclamations listed below. The law of succession of states allows for the de facto continuation of a treaty or agreement when a territory becomes independent, and many of the proclamations had effect in former dependent territories.

The United States Department of State has the responsibility to determine whether an agreement is still in force or not with respect to a given territory: it does not make this determination unless there is an actual case in question. For several former dependent territories, the question has yet to be posed and the status of their copyright relations with the United States is listed as "uncertain" by the U.S. Copyright Office.

If the country concerned has continued to protect U.S. copyrighted works since independence, the agreement may be considered to be still in force: under U.S. law, the decision lies with the Secretary of State. The President also has the option of issuing a proclamation under 17 U.S.C. 104A, which has the effect of recognizing the copyrights of the country concerned but provides safeguards for anyone who has used works in the United States while believing they were in the public domain. This latter option has been used once since it was introduced by the Uruguay Round Agreements Act in 1994, with respect to Vietnam.

== Effect of the Copyright Act of 1976 ==
Proclamations issued before January 1, 1978, the effective date of the Copyright Act of 1976, remain in force under section 104 of that Act, which provides that: "All proclamations issued by the President under section 1(e) or 9(b) of title 17 as it existed on December 31, 1977, or under previous copyright statutes of the United States, shall continue in force until terminated, suspended, or revised by the President."

== Chronological list ==
As of January 1, 2006, the U.S. State Department lists the following bilateral treaties in force.

Date of proclamation	Effective date	Country	Notes	Reference
1891-07-01	1891-07-01	Belgium, France, Great Britain and British possessions, Switzerland		27 Stat. 981
1892-04-15	1892-04-15	Germany		27 Stat. 1021
1892-10-31	1892-10-31	Italy	Letters between William F. Wharton and Saverio Fava. Based on copyright law 1012/1882 in Italy and 1891 copyright act. Ratified with Italian royal decree 17/1893 after USA presidential proclamation 35/1892; later denounced; restored in 1948. No set expiry.	27 Stat. 1043
1893-05-08	1893-05-08	Denmark		28 Stat. 1219
1893-07-20	1893-07-20	Portugal		28 Stat. 1222
1895-07-10	1895-07-10	Spain		29 Stat. 871
1896-02-27	1896-02-27	Mexico		29 Stat. 877
1896-05-25	1896-05-25	Chile		29 Stat. 880
1898-12-10	1898-12-10	Spanish possessions	Treaty	30 Stat. 1754; TS 343
1899-10-19	1899-10-19	Costa Rica		31 Stat. 1955
1899-11-20	1899-11-20	The Netherlands and Dutch possessions		31 Stat. 1961
1903-10-08	1904-01-13	China	Treaty	33 Stat. 2208
1903-11-17	1903-11-17	Cuba		33 Stat. 2324
1905-07-01	1905-07-01	Norway		34 Stat. 3111
1905-11-10	1906-05-10	Japan	Conv.	34 Stat. 2890
1907-09-20	1907-09-20	Austro-Hungarian Empire		35 Stat. 2155
1908-05-19	1908-08-06	Japanese possessions in Korea	Conv.	35 Stat. 2041
1908-05-19	1908-08-06	Japanese possessions in China	Conv.	35 Stat. 2044
1910-04-09	1909-07-01	Austro-Hungarian Empire, Belgium, Chile, Costa Rica, Cuba, Denmark, France, Germany, Great Britain and British possessions, Italy, Mexico, The Netherlands and Dutch possessions, Norway, Portugal, Spain, Switzerland		36 Stat. 2685
1910-06-29	1910-06-29	Luxembourg		36 Stat. 2716
1910-12-08	1910-12-08	Germany	m	36 Stat. 2761
1911-05-26	1911-06-01	Sweden		37 Stat. 1682
1911-06-14	1910-09-09	Norway	m	37 Stat. 1687
1911-06-14	1909-07-01	Belgium	m	37 Stat. 1688
1911-06-14	1910-06-29	Luxembourg	m	37 Stat. 1689
1911-11-27	1911-05-29	Cuba	m	37 Stat. 1721
1912-01-30	1912-10-16	Hungary	Conv., m	37 Stat. 1631
1912-10-04	1912-10-04	"the subjects of Tunis"		37 Stat. 1765
1915-01-01	1915-01-01	United Kingdom and the British Dominions, Colonies and Possessions with the exception of Canada, Australia, New Zealand, South Africa and Newfoundland	m	38 Stat. 2044
1915-05-01	1915-05-01	Italy	m	39 Stat. 1725
1916-08-04	1916-08-04	Danish West Indies	Treaty	39 Stat. 1706; TS 629
1917-02-09	1916-12-01	New Zealand	m	39 Stat. 1815
1918-04-03	1918-03-15	Australia	m	40 Stat. 1764
1918-05-24	1918-05-24	France	m	40 Stat. 1784
1920-02-27	1920-02-01	Sweden	m	41 Stat. 1787
1920-04-10	1920-02-02	United Kingdom and the British Dominions, Colonies and Possessions with the exception of Canada, Australia, New Zealand, South Africa and Newfoundland	mx	41 Stat. 1790
1920-12-09	1920-12-09	Denmark	mx	41 Stat. 1810
1920-12-16	1921-09-01	Thailand	Treaty	42 Stat. 1928; TS 655
1921-08-24	1921-08-24	Austria	Treaty	42 Stat. 1946; TS 659
1921-08-25	1921-08-25	Germany	Treaty	42 Stat. 1939; TS 658
1921-08-29	1921-08-29	Hungary	Treaty	42 Stat. 1951; TS 660
1922-05-22	1922-05-22	Austria	x	42 Stat. 2273
1922-05-25	1922-05-25	Germany	x	42 Stat. 2271
1922-05-25	1922-05-25	New Zealand	x	42 Stat. 2274
1922-06-03	1922-06-03	Italy	x	42 Stat. 2276
1922-06-03	1922-06-03	Hungary	x	42 Stat. 2277
1923-02-26	1922-10-02	The Netherlands and Dutch possessions	m	42 Stat. 2297
1923-12-27	1924-01-01	Canada	m	43 Stat. 1932
1924-06-26	1924-07-01	South Africa	m	43 Stat. 1957
1924-11-22	1923-07-01	Switzerland	m	43 Stat. 1976
1925-03-11	1920-08-01	Austria	m	44 Stat. 2571
1925-11-18	1925-07-01	Chile	m	44 Stat. 2590
1927-02-14	1927-02-16	Poland	m	44 Stat. 2634
1927-04-27	1927-03-01	Czechoslovakia	m	45 Stat. 2906
1928-05-14	1928-05-14	Romania	m	45 Stat. 2949
1928-12-15	1929-01-01	Finland	m	45 Stat. 2980
1929-09-28	1929-10-01	Irish Free State	m	46 Stat. 3005
1932-02-23	1932-03-01	Greece	m	47 Stat. 2502
1933-09-29	1933-10-01	Palestine (excluding Trans-Jordan)	m	48 Stat. 1713
1934-04-07	1934-04-07	Danzig	m	48 Stat. 1737
1934-08-23	1934-08-23	Argentina	m	49 Stat. 3413
1934-10-10	1934-10-10	Spain	m	49 Stat. 3420
1937-11-13	1938-10-01	Thailand	Treaty	53 Stat. 1731
1944-03-10	1944-03-10	United Kingdom, certain British Territories and Palestine (excluding Trans-Jordan)	xx	58 Stat. 1129
1946-11-04	1948-11-30	China	Treaty	63 Stat. 1299
1947-02-10	1947-09-15	Italy	Treaty	61 Stat. 1245; TIAS 1648
1947-02-10	1947-09-15	Romania	Treaty	61 Stat. 1757; TIAS 1649
1947-02-10	1947-09-15	Hungary	Treaty	61 Stat. 2065; TIAS 1651
1947-03-27	1947-03-27	France	xx	61 Stat. 1057
1947-04-24	1947-04-24	New Zealand	xx	61 Stat. 1065
1948-10-21	1948-10-21	Philippines	m	62 Stat. 1568
1949-12-29	1949-12-29	Australia	xx (12 months)	64 Stat. A385
1950-03-26	1950-12-29	United Kingdom, certain British Territories and Palestine (excluding Trans-Jordan)	o	64 Stat. A412
1950-05-04	1950-05-15	Israel	m	64 Stat. A402
1950-05-26	1950-12-29	France	o	64 Stat. A413
1950-05-26	1950-12-29	New Zealand	o	64 Stat. A414
1951-09-08	1952-04-28	Japan	Treaty	3 UST 3169; TIAS 2490
1951-11-16	1951-11-16	Finland	xx	66 Stat. C5
1951-12-12	1951-12-12	Italy	xx	66 Stat. C13
1952-02-04	1952-02-04	Denmark	xx	66 Stat. C20
1952-10-15	1952-10-15	Monaco	m	67 Stat. C16
1953-11-10	1952-04-28	Japan	m	5 UST 118
1954-10-21	1947-08-15	India	m	5 UST 2529
1957-04-02	1957-04-02	Brazil	m	8 UST 424
1960-06-15	1960-06-15	Austria	xx	74 Stat. C69
1966-05-29	1968-06-08	Thailand	Treaty	19 UST 5843; TIAS 6540
1967-07-12	1967-07-12	Federal Republic of Germany	xx	18 UST 2369
1987-05-18	1987-05-18	Singapore		101 Stat. 2134
1992-03-17	1992-03-17	People's Republic of China		57 F. Reg. 9647
1998-12-23	1998-12-23	Vietnam	r	63 F. Reg. 71571
2000-07-13	2001-12-10	Vietnam	Conv.	H. Doc. 107-85
2000-10-24	2001-12-17	Jordan	Conv.	H. Doc. 107-15

== See also ==
- International copyright agreements
- List of parties to international copyright agreements
- List of parties to international related rights treaties
