= Copyright Act of 1790 =

First U.S. federal legislation on copyright

- Long title: An Act for the encouragement of learning, by securing the copies of maps, Charts, And books, to the authors and proprietors of such copies, during the times therein mentioned
- Enacted by: the 1st United States Congress

Citations
- Public law: Pub. L. 1–15
- Statutes at Large: 1 Stat. 124

Legislative history
- Signed into law by President George Washington on May 31, 1790

Major amendments
- 1802 Amendment, Supplemental Copyright Act of 1819

United States Supreme Court cases
- Wheaton v. Peters

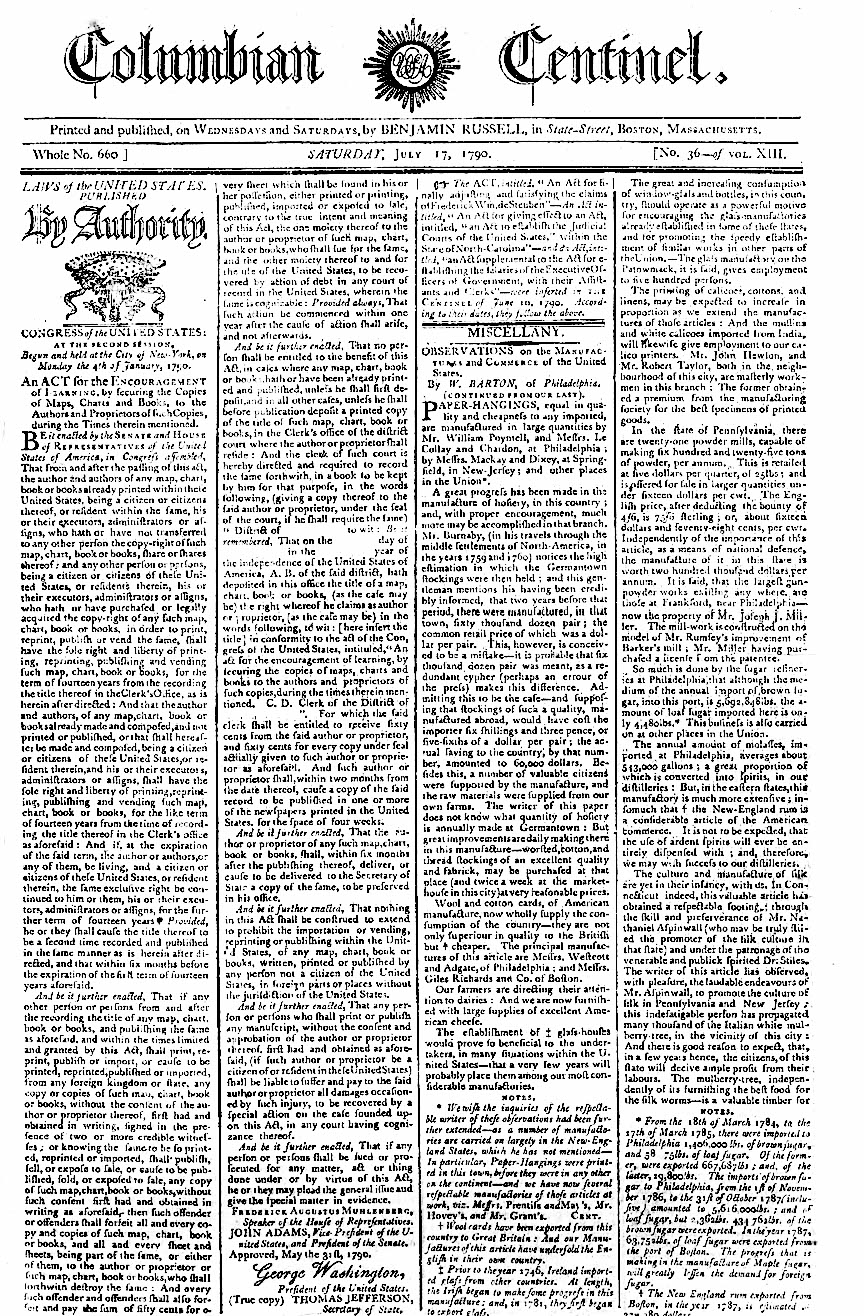
The Copyright Act of 1790 in the Columbian Centinel

The Copyright Act of 1790 was the first federal copyright act to be instituted in the United States, though most of the states had passed various legislation securing copyrights in the years immediately following the Revolutionary War. The stated object of the act was the "encouragement of learning," and it achieved this by securing authors the "sole right and liberty of printing, reprinting, publishing and vending" the copies of their "maps, charts, and books" for a term of 14 years, with the right to renew for one additional 14-year term should the copyright holder still be alive.

== Early developments ==
The 1710 British Statute of Anne did not apply to the American colonies. Only three private copyright acts were passed in the colonies prior to 1783. That year, the Continental Congress concluded "that nothing is more properly a man's own than the fruit of his study, and that the protection and security of literary property would greatly tends to encourage genius and to promote useful discoveries." But the Continental Congress had no power under the Articles of Confederation to authorize a federal copyright law; instead, it passed a resolution encouraging the states "to secure to the authors or publishers of any new book not hitherto printed... the copy right of such books for a certain time not less than fourteen years from the first publication; and to secure to the said authors, if they shall survive the term first mentioned,... the copy right of such books for another term of time no less than fourteen years". By 1786, the only state that had not implemented a copyright law was Delaware. Seven states modeled their law on the Statute of Anne and the Continental Congress' resolution, providing two fourteen-year terms. The remaining five states used non-renewable terms, which lasted fourteen, twenty or twenty-one years.

James Madison of Virginia and Charles C. Pinckney of South Carolina introduced proposals for the Copyright Clause during the Constitutional Convention 1787. The Copyright Clause authorized Congress "to promote the progress of science and useful arts" with utilitarian regimes for copyright and patent.

== Legislative history ==
During the first session of the 1st United States Congress in 1789, the House of Representatives considered enacting a copyright law. The historian Davit Ramsay petitioned Congress seeking to restrict the publication of his History of the American Revolution on April 15. Congressmen Thomas Tudor Tucker, Alexander White, and Benjamin Huntington examined his claims and a copyright committee consisting of Huntington, Lambert Cadwalader, and Benjamin Contee began drafting the legislation on April 20. Jedidiah Morse, Nicholas Pike, and Hannah Adams each also petitioned Congress with their interests in restricting the printing of texts. Their bill moved to the Committee of the Whole House in June, but the matter was postponed in anticipation of the first recess, to be taken up again when the House reconvened.

Both houses of Congress pursued a copyright law more pointedly during 1790's second session. They responded to President George Washington's first 1790 State of the Union Address, in which he urged Congress to pass legislation designed for "the promotion of Science and Literature" so as to better educate the public. This led to the Patent Act of 1790 and, shortly thereafter, the Copyright Act of 1790.

=== House of Representatives ===
The scope of what works would be covered by the law's exclusivity was contended in the House. When he reintroduced the matter, Aedanus Burke wanted to establish a first law about copyright regarding "literary property", but Alexander White called for the expansion of copyright beyond writings on the behalf of Jedidiah Morse, who believed unauthorized copying of his American Geography would hurt his business.

The need to re-raise the copyright issue, among other items left unresolved at the end of the first session, required the House to clarify some order of business problems over whether or not they could reopen unfinished business from a previous session. That settled, the House established a drafting committee for the law on February 1, chaired by Abraham Baldwin.

== The act ==
The bill was signed into law on May 31, 1790 by George Washington and published in its entirety throughout the country shortly after. The act granted copyright for a term of "fourteen years from the time of recording the title thereof" and one optional renewal. It restricted books, maps, and charts. Although musical compositions were not mentioned in the text of the act, and would not be expressly covered by copyright until the Copyright Act of 1831, they were routinely registered under the 1790 Act as "books". The act also did not mention paintings or drawings, which were not covered until the enactment of the Copyright Act of 1870.

=== Provisions ===
The British Statute of Anne was used as a basis. The first sentences of the two laws are almost identical. Both require registration in order for a work to receive copyright protection; similarly, both require that copies of the work be deposited in officially designated repositories such as the Library of Congress in the United States, and the Oxford and Cambridge universities in the United Kingdom. The Statute of Anne and the Copyright Act of 1790 both provided for an initial term of 14 years, renewable once by living authors for an additional 14 years, for works not yet published. The Statute of Anne differed from the 1790 Act, however, in providing a 21-year term of restriction, with no option for renewal, for works already published at the time the law went into effect (1710). The 1790 Act only offered a 14-year term for previously published works.

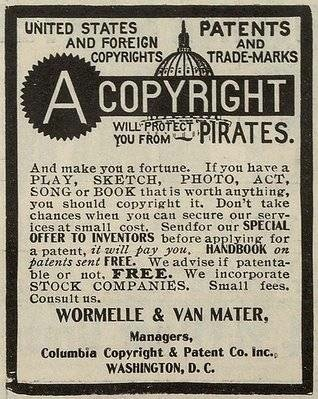
Newspaper advert: "United States and Foreign Copyright. Patents and Trade-Marks A Copyright will protect you from Pirates. And make you a fortune."

=== Geographic reach ===
The Copyright Act of 1790 applied exclusively to citizens of the United States; works created outside the United States or by people who were not U.S. citizens were not copyrightable in the U.S. until the International Copyright Act of 1891. Consequently, various foreign authors, such as Charles Dickens, complained about not receiving royalty payments for copies of their work sold in the U.S.

=== Federal law ===
At the time, works only received protection under federal statutory copyright if the statutory formalities, such as a proper copyright notice, were satisfied. If this was not the case, the work immediately entered into the public domain. In 1834 the Supreme Court ruled in Wheaton v. Peters, a case similar to the British Donaldson v Beckett of 1774, that although the author of an unpublished work had a common law right to control the first publication of that work, the author did not have a common law right to control reproduction following the first publication of the work.

== Amendments ==
The act was first amended on April 29, 1802, extending copyright restriction to etchings and, for the first time, requiring notice of copyright registration on copies of the works. The act did not specify a consequence of failing to include that notice; however, the federal case Ewer v. Coxe established that the failure to include notice invalidated a copyright.

The act was also amended on February 15, 1819, to expand the jurisdiction of circuit courts (analogous to today's district courts) to allow them to hear cases on patents and copyrights.

== See also ==
- History of copyright law
- Copyright law of the United States
