= KVOS v. Associated Press =

- Supreme Court of the United States

Decided December 14, 1936
- Full case name: KVOS v. Associated Press
- Citations: 299 U.S. 269 (more) 57 S. Ct. 197; 81 L. Ed. 183

Holding
- An association of newspapers cannot sue collectively to raise their projected damages above the minimum damages required for federal jurisdiction when only individual newspapers are parties to unfair competition.

Court membership
- Chief Justice Charles E. Hughes Associate Justices Willis Van Devanter · James C. McReynolds; Louis Brandeis · George Sutherland; Pierce Butler · Harlan F. Stone; Owen Roberts · Benjamin N. Cardozo

Case opinion
- Majority: Roberts

KVOS v. Associated Press, 299 U.S. 269 (1936), was a United States Supreme Court case in which the Court held an association of newspapers cannot sue collectively to raise their projected damages above the minimum damages required for federal jurisdiction when only individual newspapers are parties to unfair competition.
