= DeJonge & Co. v. Breuker & Kessler Co. =

- Supreme Court of the United States

Argued October 27–28, 1914 Decided November 9, 1914
- Full case name: DeJonge and Company v. Breuker and Kessler Company
- Citations: 235 U.S. 33 (more) 35 S. Ct. 6; 59 L. Ed. 113

Holding
- Every instance of a copyrighted work must observe copyright notice formalities for the work to maintain copyright, even if the work appears multiple times on the same sheet of paper. Every copy of a copyrighted painting must bear the notice for the painting to maintain copyright.

Court membership
- Chief Justice Edward D. White Associate Justices Joseph McKenna · Oliver W. Holmes Jr. William R. Day · Charles E. Hughes; Willis Van Devanter · Joseph R. Lamar; Mahlon Pitney · James C. McReynolds

Case opinion
- Majority: Holmes, joined by a unanimous court

Laws applied
- Copyright Act of 1909

DeJonge & Co. v. Breuker & Kessler Co., 235 U.S. 33 (1914), was a United States Supreme Court case in which the Court held every instance of a copyrighted work must observe copyright notice formalities for the work to maintain copyright, even if the work appears multiple times on the same sheet of paper. Every copy of a copyrighted painting must bear the notice for the painting to maintain copyright.
