= G. & C. Merriam Co. v. Syndicate Publishing Co. =

- Supreme Court of the United States

Argued April 14, 1915 Decided June 1, 1915
- Full case name: G. & C. Merriam Company v. Syndicate Publishing Company
- Citations: 237 U.S. 618 (more) 35 S. Ct. 708; 59 L. Ed. 1148

Case history
- Prior: 207 F. 515; 207 F. 515.

Holding
- Under the Trademark Act of 1881, after a copyrighted work expires, the word used to designate that work falls into the public domain and cannot be trademarked.

Court membership
- Chief Justice Edward D. White Associate Justices Joseph McKenna · Oliver W. Holmes Jr. William R. Day · Charles E. Hughes; Willis Van Devanter · Joseph R. Lamar; Mahlon Pitney · James C. McReynolds

Case opinions
- Majority: Day
- Concurrence: unanimous

Laws applied
- Trademark Act of 1881

G. & C. Merriam Co. v. Syndicate Publishing Co., 237 U.S. 618 (1915), was a United States Supreme Court case in which the Court held that, under the Trademark Act of 1881, after a copyrighted work expires, the word used to designate that work falls into the public domain and cannot be trademarked.

== Background ==
This suit was brought by complainant to enjoin the defendant from the use of the name "Webster" as a trademark and tradename when applied to the sale of dictionaries of the English language. A decree was entered dismissing the bill in the United States district court. This decree was affirmed upon appeal to the Second Circuit Court of Appeals, and from the latter decree an appeal was taken to the Supreme Court.
