= George v. Victor Talking Machine Co. =

- Supreme Court of the United States

Argued December 5, 1934 Decided December 17, 1934
- Full case name: George v. Victor Talking Machine Co.
- Citations: 293 U.S. 377 (more) 55 S. Ct. 229; 79 L. Ed. 439

Holding
- The district court's ruling of infringement of a song's common law copyright, granting an injunction so that damages could be determined, was interlocutory. The appeal came too late, so the Court vacated the appeal.

Court membership
- Chief Justice Charles E. Hughes Associate Justices Willis Van Devanter · James C. McReynolds; Louis Brandeis · George Sutherland; Pierce Butler · Harlan F. Stone; Owen Roberts · Benjamin N. Cardozo

Case opinion
- Per curiam

George v. Victor Talking Machine Co., 293 U.S. 377 (1934), was a United States Supreme Court case in which the Court held the district court's ruling of infringement of a song's common law copyright, granting an injunction so that damages could be determined, was interlocutory. The appeal came too late, so the Court vacated the appeal.
