= Fox Film Corp. v. Doyal =

Fox Film Corp v. Doyal
- Supreme Court of the United States

Argued January 12, 1932 Decided May 16, 1932
- Full case name: Fox Film Corp v. Doyal
- Citations: 286 U.S. 123 (more) 52 S. Ct. 546; 76 L. Ed. 1010

Holding
- States may tax copyright royalties, as they can patent royalties, because even though copyrights & patents are granted by the federal government, they are still private property subject to taxation.

Court membership
- Chief Justice Charles E. Hughes Associate Justices Willis Van Devanter · James C. McReynolds; Louis Brandeis · George Sutherland; Pierce Butler · Harlan F. Stone; Owen Roberts · Benjamin N. Cardozo

Case opinion
- Majority: Hughes, joined by a unanimous court

Fox Film Corp v. Doyal, 286 U.S. 123 (1932), was a United States Supreme Court case in which the Court held that states may tax copyright royalties, as they can patent royalties, because even though copyrights & patents are granted by the federal government, they are still private property subject to taxation.
