= L. A. Westermann Co. v. Dispatch Printing Co. =

- Supreme Court of the United States

Submitted November 15, 1918 Decided March 3, 1919
- Full case name: L. A. Westermann Co. v. Dispatch Printing Co.
- Citations: 249 U.S. 100 (more) 39 S. Ct. 194; 63 L. Ed. 499

Holding
- Penalties awarded "in lieu of actual damages and profits" cannot be less than $250 for each case of copyright infringement.

Court membership
- Chief Justice Edward D. White Associate Justices Joseph McKenna · Oliver W. Holmes Jr. William R. Day · Willis Van Devanter; Mahlon Pitney · James C. McReynolds; Louis Brandeis · John H. Clarke

Case opinion
- Majority: Van Devanter, joined by unanimous
- Day took no part in the consideration or decision of the case.

L. A. Westermann Co. v. Dispatch Printing Co., 249 U.S. 100 (1919), was a United States Supreme Court case in which the Court held that penalties awarded "in lieu of actual damages and profits" cannot be less than $250 for each case of copyright infringement.
