= Straus v. American Publishers Association =

Straus v. American Publishers Ass'n
- Supreme Court of the United States

Argued March 7, 1913 Decided December 1, 1913
- Full case name: Straus & Straus v. American Publishers Association
- Citations: 231 U.S. 222 (more) 34 S. Ct. 84; 58 L. Ed. 192

Holding
- An agreement that is manifestly anti-competitive and illegal under the Sherman Antitrust Act cannot be justified by copyright.

Court membership
- Chief Justice Edward D. White Associate Justices Joseph McKenna · Oliver W. Holmes Jr. William R. Day · Horace H. Lurton; Charles E. Hughes · Willis Van Devanter; Joseph R. Lamar · Mahlon Pitney

Case opinion
- Majority: Day, joined by unanimous

Straus v. American Publishers Association, 231 U.S. 222 (1913), was a United States Supreme Court case in which the Court held an agreement that is manifestly anti-competitive and illegal under the Sherman Antitrust Act cannot be justified by copyright.
