= Order of St. Benedict of New Jersey v. Steinhauser =

- Supreme Court of the United States

Argued March 11, 1914 Decided June 22, 1914
- Full case name: Order of St. Benedict of New Jersey v. Steinhauser
- Citations: 234 U.S. 640 (more) 34 S. Ct. 932; 58 L. Ed. 1512

Case history
- Prior: 194 F. 289 (8th Cir. 1912)

Holding
- When someone joins an ecclesiastical order, subject to individual state law, their income from copyright may be dedicated to that order's common fund as much as any other income or form of property. This does not violate any part of the Constitution if the member may withdraw from the order at any time.

Court membership
- Chief Justice Edward D. White Associate Justices Joseph McKenna · Oliver W. Holmes Jr. William R. Day · Horace H. Lurton; Charles E. Hughes · Willis Van Devanter; Joseph R. Lamar · Mahlon Pitney

Case opinion
- Majority: Hughes, joined by a unanimous court

Order of St. Benedict of New Jersey v. Steinhauser, 234 U.S. 640 (1914), was a United States Supreme Court case in which the Court held that when someone joins an ecclesiastical order, subject to individual state law, their income from copyright may be dedicated to that order's common fund as much as any other income or form of property. This does not violate any part of the Constitution if the member may withdraw from the order at any time.
