= Bolles v. Outing Co. =

- Supreme Court of the United States

Submitted October 16, 1899 Decided December 4, 1899
- Full case name: Bolles v. Outing Co.
- Citations: 175 U.S. 262 (more) 20 S. Ct. 94; 44 L. Ed. 156

Holding
- Under the Revised Statutes, someone seeking damages for copyright infringement is only eligible for damages from illicit copies found in the accused's possession. Copies already distributed are out of scope.

Court membership
- Chief Justice Melville Fuller Associate Justices John M. Harlan · Horace Gray; David J. Brewer · Henry B. Brown; George Shiras Jr. · Edward D. White; Rufus W. Peckham · Joseph McKenna

Bolles v. Outing Co., 175 U.S. 262 (1899), was a United States Supreme Court case in which the Court held under the Revised Statutes of the United States, someone seeking damages for copyright infringement is only eligible for damages from illicit copies found in the accused's possession. Copies already distributed are out of scope.
