= American Lithographic Co. v. Werkmeister =

- Supreme Court of the United States

Argued April 10, 1911 Decided May 29, 1911
- Full case name: American Lithographic Co. v. Werkmeister
- Citations: 221 U.S. 603 (more) 31 S. Ct. 676; 55 L. Ed. 873

Holding
- A corporation defendant in a suit to enforce copyright infringement penalties is not entitled to a Fourth or Fifth Amendment objection to the admission of its bookkeeping entries into evidence when they are produced under a subpoena.

Court membership
- Chief Justice Edward D. White Associate Justices John M. Harlan · Joseph McKenna; Oliver W. Holmes Jr. · William R. Day; Horace H. Lurton · Charles E. Hughes; Willis Van Devanter · Joseph R. Lamar

American Lithographic Co. v. Werkmeister, 221 U.S. 603 (1911), was a United States Supreme Court case in which the Court held that a corporation defendant in a suit to enforce copyright infringement penalties is not entitled to a Fourth or Fifth Amendment objection to the admission of its bookkeeping entries into evidence when they are produced under a subpoena duces tecum.
