= American Tobacco Co. v. Werckmeister =

- Supreme Court of the United States

Argued October 30, 1907 Decided December 2, 1907
- Full case name: American Tobacco Co. v. Werckmeister
- Citations: 207 U.S. 284 (more) 28 S. Ct. 72; 52 L. Ed. 208

Holding
- The seizure by the United States marshal in a copyright case of certain pictures under a writ of replevin did not constitute an unreasonable search and seizure.

Court membership
- Chief Justice Melville Fuller Associate Justices John M. Harlan · David J. Brewer; Edward D. White · Rufus W. Peckham; Joseph McKenna · Oliver W. Holmes Jr. William R. Day · William H. Moody

Case opinion
- Majority: Day, joined by a unanimous court

American Tobacco Co. v. Werckmeister, 207 U.S. 284 (1907), was a United States Supreme Court case in which the Court held the seizure by the United States marshal in a copyright case of certain pictures under a writ of replevin did not constitute an unreasonable search and seizure.
