= Trade-Mark Cases =

In re Trade-Mark Cases
- Supreme Court of the United States

Argued October 22, 1879, Decided November 17, 1879,
- Full case name: United States v. Steffens; United States v. Wittemann; United States v. Johnson
- Docket no.: 705
- Citations: 100 U.S. 82 (more) 25 L. Ed. 550; 1879 U.S. LEXIS 1808

Holding
- The Copyright Clause of the Constitution does not give Congress power to protect or regulate trademarks.

Case opinion
- Majority: Miller, joined by Clifford, Swayne, Field, Strong, Bradley, Hunt, Waite, Harlan

Laws applied
- U.S. Const. Art. I, Sect. 8, Cl. 8

The Trade-Mark Cases, 100 U.S. 82 (1879), were a set of three cases consolidated into a single appeal before the United States Supreme Court, which in 1879 unanimously ruled that the Copyright Clause of the Constitution gave Congress no power to protect or regulate trademarks. Congress then passed the Trade Mark Act of 1881, which was based on the Commerce Clause power, and therefore passed constitutional muster.

The three cases were United States v. Steffens, United States v. Wittemann, and United States v. Johnson. Steffens and Wittemann dealt with alleged counterfeiting of marks associated with champagne, while Johnson dealt with alleged counterfeiting of a mark associated with whiskey.

The opinion was written by Justice Samuel Freeman Miller.

The Court did not exclude all possibility of Congress regulating trademarks. Congress, however, read the decision very strictly and in a new trademark law enacted in 1881 regulated only trademarks used in commerce with foreign nations, and with the Indian tribes, areas specified under the Commerce Clause. It was not until 1905 that Congress would again enact a trademark law generally governing marks in use in the United States, though the 1905 act was also carefully worded to fall within the Commerce Clause.
