= List of United States Supreme Court cases, volume 237 =

Supreme Court of the United States
- Interactive map of Supreme Court of the United States
- 38°53′26″N 77°00′16″W
- Established: March 4, 1789; 236 years ago
- Location: Washington, D.C.
- Coordinates: 38°53′26″N 77°00′16″W
- Composition method: Presidential nomination with Senate confirmation
- Authorised by: Constitution of the United States, Art. III, § 1
- Judge term length: life tenure, subject to impeachment and removal
- Number of positions: 9 (by statute)
- Website: supremecourt.gov

This is a list of cases reported in volume 237 of United States Reports, decided by the Supreme Court of the United States in 1915.

== Justices of the Supreme Court at the time of volume 237 U.S. ==
The Supreme Court is established by Article III, Section 1 of the Constitution of the United States, which says: "The judicial Power of the United States, shall be vested in one supreme Court . . .". The size of the Court is not specified; the Constitution leaves it to Congress to set the number of justices. Under the Judiciary Act of 1789 Congress originally fixed the number of justices at six (one chief justice and five associate justices). Since 1789 Congress has varied the size of the Court from six to seven, nine, ten, and back to nine justices (always including one chief justice).

When the cases in volume 237 were decided the Court comprised the following nine members:

Portrait	Justice	Office	Home State	Succeeded	Date confirmed by the Senate (Vote)	Tenure on Supreme Court
	Edward Douglass White	Chief Justice	Louisiana	Melville Fuller	December 12, 1910 (Acclamation)	December 19, 1910 – May 19, 1921 (Died)
	Joseph McKenna	Associate Justice	California	Stephen Johnson Field	January 21, 1898 (Acclamation)	January 26, 1898 – January 5, 1925 (Retired)
	Oliver Wendell Holmes Jr.	Associate Justice	Massachusetts	Horace Gray	December 4, 1902 (Acclamation)	December 8, 1902 – January 12, 1932 (Retired)
	William R. Day	Associate Justice	Ohio	George Shiras Jr.	February 23, 1903 (Acclamation)	March 2, 1903 – November 13, 1922 (Retired)
	Charles Evans Hughes	Associate Justice	New York	David Josiah Brewer	May 2, 1910 (Acclamation)	October 10, 1910 – June 10, 1916 (Resigned)
	Willis Van Devanter	Associate Justice	Wyoming	Edward Douglass White (as Associate Justice)	December 15, 1910 (Acclamation)	January 3, 1911 – June 2, 1937 (Retired)
	Joseph Rucker Lamar	Associate Justice	Georgia	William Henry Moody	December 15, 1910 (Acclamation)	January 3, 1911 – January 2, 1916 (Died)
	Mahlon Pitney	Associate Justice	New Jersey	John Marshall Harlan	March 13, 1912 (50–26)	March 18, 1912 – December 31, 1922 (Resigned)
	James Clark McReynolds	Associate Justice	Tennessee	Horace Harmon Lurton	August 29, 1914 (44–6)	October 12, 1914 – January 31, 1941 (Retired)

== Notable case in 237 U.S. ==
=== Frank v. Mangum ===
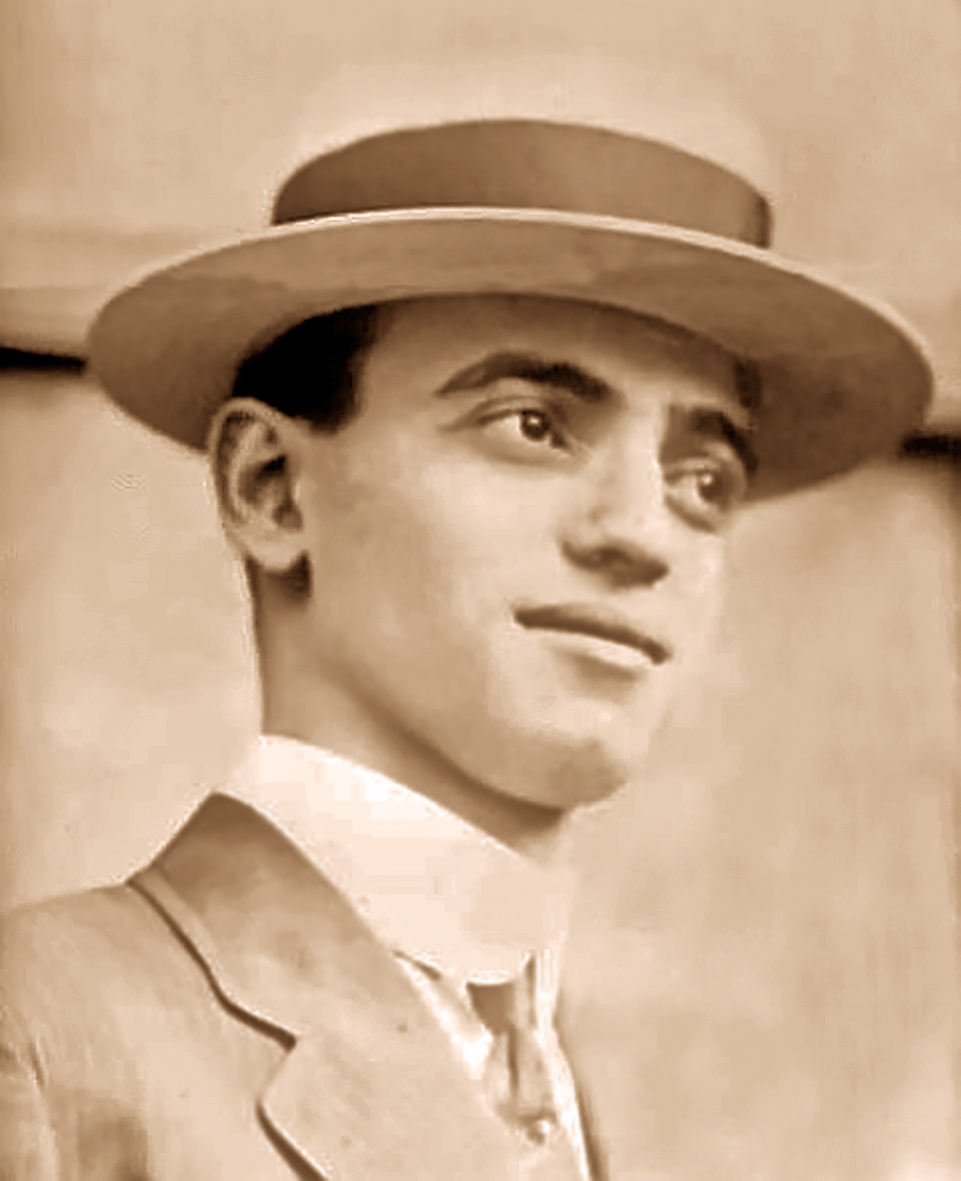
Leo Frank (1884–1915)

Frank v. Mangum, 237 U.S. 309 (1915), was an appeal by Leo Frank, a young Jewish businessman, against his murder conviction in Georgia. In April 1915 the Supreme Court denied Frank's appeal by a 7–2 vote. Part of the decision was due to Frank's lawyers having failed timely to raise the argument that the threat of crowd violence during his trial had forced Frank to be absent from the verdict hearing, violating his right to due process. Justices Holmes and Hughes dissented, with Holmes writing, "It is our duty to declare lynch law as little valid when practiced by a regularly drawn jury as when administered by one elected by a mob intent on death." Four months later a crowd of upstanding citizens of Georgia murdered Frank by lynching after the governor commuted his death sentence to life imprisonment.

== Citation style ==
Under the Judiciary Act of 1789 the federal court structure at the time comprised District Courts, which had general trial jurisdiction; Circuit Courts, which had mixed trial and appellate (from the US District Courts) jurisdiction; and the United States Supreme Court, which had appellate jurisdiction over the federal District and Circuit courts—and for certain issues over state courts. The Supreme Court also had limited original jurisdiction (i.e., in which cases could be filed directly with the Supreme Court without first having been heard by a lower federal or state court). There were one or more federal District Courts and/or Circuit Courts in each state, territory, or other geographical region.

The Judiciary Act of 1891 created the United States Courts of Appeals and reassigned the jurisdiction of most routine appeals from the district and circuit courts to these appellate courts. The Act created nine new courts that were originally known as the "United States Circuit Courts of Appeals." The new courts had jurisdiction over most appeals of lower court decisions. The Supreme Court could review either legal issues that a court of appeals certified or decisions of court of appeals by writ of certiorari. On January 1, 1912, the effective date of the Judicial Code of 1911, the old Circuit Courts were abolished, with their remaining trial court jurisdiction transferred to the U.S. District Courts.

Bluebook citation style is used for case names, citations, and jurisdictions.

- "# Cir." = United States Court of Appeals
  - e.g., "3d Cir." = United States Court of Appeals for the Third Circuit
- "D." = United States District Court for the District of . . .
  - e.g.,"D. Mass." = United States District Court for the District of Massachusetts
- "E." = Eastern; "M." = Middle; "N." = Northern; "S." = Southern; "W." = Western
  - e.g.,"M.D. Ala." = United States District Court for the Middle District of Alabama
- "Ct. Cl." = United States Court of Claims
- The abbreviation of a state's name alone indicates the highest appellate court in that state's judiciary at the time.
  - e.g.,"Pa." = Supreme Court of Pennsylvania
  - e.g.,"Me." = Supreme Judicial Court of Maine

== List of cases in volume 237 U.S. ==
Case Name	Page & year	Opinion of the Court	Concurring opinion(s)	Dissenting opinion(s)	Lower Court	Disposition
United States v. Hvoslef	1 (1915)	Hughes	none	none	S.D.N.Y.	affirmed
Thames et al. Ins. Co. v. United States	19 (1915)	Hughes	none	none	S.D.N.Y.	reversed
United States v. Emery et al. Co.	28 (1915)	Holmes	none	none	W.D. Mo.	affirmed
New Orleans T.P.P.A. v. Sewerage & W. Bd.	33 (1915)	Holmes	none	none	La.	dismissed
Smoot v. United States	38 (1915)	Holmes	none	none	Ct. Cl.	affirmed
Henkel v. United States	43 (1915)	Day	none	none	9th Cir.	affirmed
Sligh v. Kirkwood	52 (1915)	Day	none	none	Fla.	affirmed
South Carolina ex rel. Phoenix et al. Co. v. McMaster	63 (1915)	Day	none	none	S.C.	affirmed
United States v. Noble	74 (1915)	Hughes	none	none	8th Cir.	reversed
Robinson v. Baltimore & O.R.R. Co.	84 (1915)	Hughes	none	none	D.C. Cir.	affirmed
Louisville & N.R.R. Co. v. Maxwell	94 (1915)	Hughes	none	none	Tenn.	reversed
Guffey v. Smith I	101 (1915)	VanDevanter	none	none	7th Cir.	reversed
Guffey v. Smith II	120 (1915)	VanDevanter	none	none	7th Cir.	reversed
Pennsylvania R.R. Co. v. Puritan C.M. Co.	121 (1915)	Lamar	none	none	Pa.	affirmed
Chapman v. Zobelein	135 (1915)	Lamar	none	none	Cal.	affirmed
Eastern R.R. Co. v. Littlefield	140 (1915)	Lamar	none	none	Tex.	dismissed
United States v. Sherman & Sons Co.	146 (1915)	Lamar	none	none	2d Cir.	certification
American S. Co. v. Shulz	159 (1915)	Lamar	none	none	S.D.N.Y.	affirmed
Knapp v. Alexander et al. Co.	162 (1915)	Pitney	none	none	Wis. Cir. Ct.	reversed
Reinman v. City of Little Rock	171 (1915)	Pitney	none	none	Ark.	affirmed
Malloy v. South Carolina	180 (1915)	McReynolds	none	none	S.C.	affirmed
Detroit T. Co. v. Pontiac S. Bank	186 (1915)	McReynolds	none	none	6th Cir.	affirmed
Riverside et al. Mills v. Menefee	189 (1915)	White	none	none	N.C.	reversed
United States ex rel. Chott v. Ewing	197 (1915)	White	none	none	D.C. Cir.	dismissed
Southern P.R.R. Co. v. United States	202 (1915)	White	none	none	Ct. Cl.	affirmed
Texas & P.R.R. Co. v. Hill	208 (1915)	White	none	none	5th Cir.	affirmed
Texas & P.R.R. Co. v. Marcus	215 (1915)	White	none	none	5th Cir.	affirmed
Chicago et al. R.R. Co. v. Wisconsin R.R. Comm'n	220 (1915)	McKenna	none	none	Wis.	reversed
Christie v. United States	234 (1915)	McKenna	none	none	Ct. Cl.	reversed
Greenleaf J.L. Co. v. Garrison	251 (1915)	McKenna	none	none	4th Cir.	affirmed
New York ex rel. IRT v. Sohmer	276 (1915)	Holmes	none	none	N.Y. Sup. Ct.	affirmed
McGowan v. Parish	285 (1915)	Pitney	none	none	D.C. Cir.	reversed
Louisville & N.R.R. Co. v. Western Union T. Co.	300 (1915)	Holmes	none	none	5th Cir.	dismissed
Rounds v. Cloverport et al. Co.	303 (1915)	Hughes	none	none	Ky.	affirmed
Frank v. Mangum	309 (1915)	Pitney	none	Holmes	N.D. Ga.	affirmed
Stewart M. Co. v. Ontario M. Co.	350 (1915)	McKenna	none	none	Idaho	affirmed
Doran v. Kennedy	362 (1915)	McKenna	none	none	Minn.	affirmed
Minneapolis et al. R.R. Co. v. Popplar	369 (1915)	Hughes	none	none	Minn.	affirmed
McDougal v. McKay	372 (1915)	McReynolds	none	none	Okla.	affirmed
Pigeon v. Buck	386 (1915)	McReynolds	none	none	Okla.	affirmed
Export et al. Co. v. Port et al. Co.	388 (1915)	McReynolds	none	none	Phil.	dismissed
Booth v. Indiana	391 (1915)	McKenna	none	none	Ind.	affirmed
Chicago & N.R.R. Co. v. Gray	399 (1915)	Holmes	none	none	Wis.	affirmed
United States v. Erie R.R. Co.	402 (1915)	VanDevanter	none	none	3d Cir.	reversed
United States v. Chicago et al. R.R. Co.	410 (1915)	VanDevanter	none	none	8th Cir.	reversed
Coe v. Armour F. Works	413 (1915)	Pitney	none	none	Fla.	reversed
Erie R.R. Co. v. Solomon	427 (1915)	White	none	none	Ohio	dismissed
Pennsylvania R.R. Co. v. Keystone et al. Co.	432 (1915)	Holmes	none	none	Pa.	dismissed
Ellis v. ICC	434 (1915)	Holmes	none	none	N.D. Ill.	reversed
Cumberland G. Mfg. Co. v. De Witt & Co.	447 (1915)	Day	none	none	Md.	affirmed
Parker v. McLain	469 (1915)	VanDevanter	none	none	Kan.	dismissed
Georgia v. Tennessee C. Co. I	474 (1915)	McReynolds	none	none	original	continued
Healy v. Sea G.S. Co.	479 (1915)	Holmes	none	none	E.D. La.	reversed
Booth K.L. Co. v. United States	481 (1915)	Holmes	none	none	9th Cir.	affirmed
Spokane et al. R.R. Co. v. Whitley	487 (1915)	Hughes	none	none	Idaho	affirmed
Seaboard et al. R.R. Co. v. Tilghman	499 (1915)	VanDevanter	none	none	N.C.	reversed
Collins v. Johnston	502 (1915)	Pitney	none	none	N.D. Cal.	affirmed
Longpré v. Diaz	512 (1915)	White	none	none	D.P.R.	reversed
Royal Arcanum v. Green	531 (1915)	White	none	none	N.Y. Sup. Ct.	reversed
Daniels v. Wagner	547 (1915)	White	none	none	9th Cir.	reversed
Daniels v. Johnston	568 (1915)	White	none	none	9th Cir.	reversed
Daniels v. Merrithew	570 (1915)	White	none	none	9th Cir.	reversed
Daniels v. Bernhard	572 (1915)	White	none	none	9th Cir.	reversed
Daniels v. Craddock	574 (1915)	White	none	none	9th Cir.	reversed
St. Anthony C. v. Pennsylvania R.R. Co.	575 (1915)	White	none	none	3d Cir.	dismissed
Toop v. Ulysses L. Co.	580 (1915)	White	none	none	D. Neb.	dismissed
Brown & Schermerhorn	583 (1915)	White	none	none	2d Cir.	reversed
Waugh v. University of Miss.	589 (1915)	McKenna	none	none	Miss.	affirmed
Charleston et al. R.R. Co. v. Varnville F. Co.	597 (1915)	Holmes	none	none	S.C.	reversed
Lumber U'writers v. Rife	605 (1915)	Holmes	none	none	6th Cir.	reversed
Hood v. McGehee	611 (1915)	Holmes	none	none	5th Cir.	affirmed
Park v. Cameron	616 (1915)	Holmes	none	none	W.D. Tex.	affirmed
G. & C. Merriam Co. v. Syndicate P. Co.	618 (1915)	Day	none	none	2d Cir.	dismissed
Ebeling v. Morgan	625 (1915)	Day	none	none	D. Kan.	affirmed
Morgan v. Devine	632 (1915)	Day	none	none	D. Kan.	reversed
Bothwell v. Bingham Cnty.	642 (1915)	VanDevanter	none	none	Idaho	affirmed
St. Louis et al. R.R. Co. v. Craft	648 (1915)	VanDevanter	none	none	Ark.	affirmed
Hartford L. Ins. Co. v. IBS	662 (1915)	Lamar	none	none	Minn. Dist. Ct.	reversed
Sawyer v. Gray	674 (1915)	White	none	none	9th Cir.	reversed
Georgia v. Tennessee C. Co. II	678 (1915)	per curiam	none	none	original	decree entered
