= International Copyright Act of 1891 =

US federal legislation

- Other short titles: Chace Act
- Long title: An act to amend Title LX, Chapter 3, of the Revised Statutes of the United States, relating to copyrights
- Enacted by: the 51st United States Congress
- Effective: July 1, 1891

Legislative history
- Signed into law by President Benjamin Harrison on March 3, 1891

The International Copyright Act of 1891 (26 Stat. 1106, March 3, 1891) is the first U.S. congressional act that extended limited protection to foreign copyright holders from select nations. Formally known as the "International Copyright Act of 1891", but more commonly referred to as the "Chace Act" after Sen. Jonathan Chace of Rhode Island.

The International Copyright Act of 1891 was the first U.S. congressional act that offered copyright protection in the United States to citizens of countries other than the United States. The act allowed the President to enter the United States in bilateral copyright treaties, extending copyright to the works of nationals from signatory countries and receiving copyright for the works of Americans in that signatory country.

The act was passed on March 3, 1891, by the 51st Congress. The Act went into effect on July 1, 1891. On July 3, 1891, the first foreign work, a play called Saints and Sinners by British author Henry Arthur Jones, was registered under the act.

== Background ==
Although international copyright protections are common now, and literary piracy is generally recognized as a crime, such broad-reaching protections have not always existed. In the decades following the American Revolution, it became common for works of British literature to be reprinted in the United States without any acknowledgment, authorization, or compensation given to the original author. Because of a lack of agreed upon international law at the time, this literary piracy was entirely legal, and the immense distance between the two nations made the issue difficult to address.

=== Establishment of copyright laws ===
The Statute of Anne, passed in 1710, was the first English law to provide for copyright regulated by the government and courts, rather than by private parties. This act protected the reproduction of British works produced by British Authors, but did not have any jurisdiction outside of the United Kingdom. In 1869, Edward Thornton, British minister to the United States, proposed the first international copyright laws between the United States and the United Kingdom to try and stem the spread of international literary piracy.

=== International piracy ===
During the 18th century, literary pirates would bring British novels back to America, reprint them (with the original author's name in order to escape incrimination, but still using another author's work for their own personal gain), and yet never give the original author any compensation for their work. This system fell into place largely because the nation did not have any real individual literary identity at that point in time. During that period, the United States was still in the early stages of its independent development as a nation and most of what the new American public was comfortable with involved British culture and ideas. These pirated novels had already established a reputation and success in England and were therefore not a risk to publishers in the States, who already knew that there would likely be a success in the New World. In some cases, these pirated novels were more accessible in America than they were to the British where they were originally printed. Although novels were a large portion of the pirated works from England, magazines, and newspapers were included in the stolen works as well.

One primary example can be seen in Harper's New Monthly Magazine, a magazine that was aimed at women and attempted to create a patriotic attitude in the developing nation. Harper's ideas and strategies involved exposing these women to the British form of "elevated" culture in an effort to increase the standard and quality of the new American literature, which would result from the British inspiration they provided in their magazine. It was formerly believed that because of America's lack of a social class system, there would be no real need for a strong literary tradition. Harper's tried to expose the British tradition in order to facilitate growth for the American tradition. They sold for a low cost because there was no compensation being paid to the original authors back in England for the sole purpose of exposing every educated person in the new American public to "the unbounded treasures of the periodical literature of the present day".

The important thing was not the actual content of the magazines or their national origin but more about how much circulation and exposure these pieces received. This feeling of inspiration eventually backfired when the American authors were intimidated by the intense connection and dependence on British authors and did not produce many. Eventually, the resentment for the lack of Americanism led to a change in Harper's to include more national, not international, authors. This change never really paid off and the magazine did not see the same amount of success and profit that it received from the British pirated material.

=== The protection of foreign works ===
During the time when the United States was just beginning to develop its own literary tradition, the nation refused to protect foreign works. As a result, American works were unprotected abroad and domestic publishers had to compete with each other for cheap editions of foreign works. Prior to the International Copyright Act, the first national copyright law was passed in 1790 and provided a copyright protection for 14 years, but only for authors who were citizens or residents of the United States. In order to get copyright protection in the rest of the world, American authors were required to gain residency in the country in which they desired copyright protection. For example, Mark Twain obtained residency in Canada to protect his publication of The Prince and the Pauper.

To protect foreign literature in the United States, British authors would have an American citizen serve as a collaborator in the publishing process, and then have the book registered in Washington, D.C., under the collaborator's name. It was not until the 1830s that the pressure to extend American copyright to foreign authors first developed. Both American and British authors and publishers joined forces and pushed for a bilateral treaty between the United States and England. Famous authors such as Charles Dickens came to the United States to show their support for international copyright. Their biggest problem were American printers that already were protected by a high tariff on imported works, and who had no wish to pay royalties to English writers or publishers.

The United States discussed international copyright with Great Britain over the years. Congress requested correspondence to this effect in 1842. There was a proposed treaty in 1853 under Millard Fillmore, and consideration of its ratification continued into an extension provided during Franklin Pierce's presidency in 1854.

Nonetheless, in the United States, only works published in the United States could be restricted with copyright. Authors including Mark Twain, Louisa May Alcott, Edward Eggleston, and Bill Nye wrote letters in the mid-1880s to the Century requesting international copyright. These letters to the journals had a strong effect on this issue, as did the American Copyright League that was formed in 1883. The league was a great supporter of an International Copyright Act and, at the Madison Square Theater in 1885, the league sponsored readings by American authors in aid of the League's cause.

In 1885, United States Senator Joseph Roswell Hawley introduced a bill aimed at extending copyright to foreign authors for consideration by Congress. A chief difference between the Hawley Bill and the eventual Chace Bill was Hawley's removal of publisher and book-sellers' interests in the copyright process. It was ultimately unsuccessful, though Mark Twain involved himself in the lobbying process and influenced President Grover Cleveland's thinking on the matter. Cleveland asked Congress for legislation to this effect in his State of the Union address that December.

=== "National treatment" ===
While the United States did not extend copyright to foreign literary works, countries in Europe started signing bilateral copyright treaties requiring "national treatment." This principle meant that each nation that signed the treaty was obligated to protect works produced by nationals of all other treaty members on the same terms that it protects its own nationals.

In 1884, academics, writers and diplomats met in Berne, Switzerland, to draft the multilateral copyright treaty eventually known as the Berne Convention. This was based on the principle of national treatment together with minimum standards so that a member country would be free to treat the copyrighted work of its own nationals however they chose to, but when it came to the works from other treaty members it would have to obey certain minimum standards. The treaty was signed in 1886 but the United States was not one of its founding members. American representatives had attended the Berne conference only as observers and it would take another 5 years until the United States took its first step to protect foreign works.

=== Effects of the Act ===
==== "The manufacturing clause" ====
Ever since the first national copyright law in 1790, the United States had required certain "statutory formalities" to acquire copyright protection. These formalities served as a test of an author's intention to claim protection for his or her work. The International Copyright Act of 1891 now applied these formalities to foreign publishers as well, but added an extra requirement called the "Manufacturing Clause".

The Manufacturing Clause required that all copies of foreign literary works should be printed from type set in the United States if they were to have American protection. This was an obvious concession to American printers, since they might otherwise have opposed the Act. When the International Copyright Act of 1891 was finally passed, foreign authors had to have their works in Washington, D.C., "on or before the day of publication in this or any foreign country." This too would create a problem, but by the early 1900s British authors were granted American Copyright since it was published abroad thirty days from its deposit in Washington, D.C. This would then allow American publishers time to release an authorized edition.

==== Provisions of the Act ====
The International Copyright Act of 1891 instituted important changes in copyright matters. One of the most extensive changes was that from the date the Act went into effect, all books were required to be manufactured in the United States in order to obtain American copyright. However, foreign authors had a better chance of protecting their works than before. This Act was the first step that the United States took towards an international copyright that could benefit foreign authors as well as domestic. Throughout time, the United States had been somewhat of a copyright outcast since they had not joined many international treaties or conventions. However, as the United States became a major exporter of copyrighted materials this changed. Even if there's still no such thing as an "international copyright" that will automatically protect an author's rights throughout the world, the International Copyright Act of 1891 was the first step to a number of international copyright treaties and conventions that the United States is now a part of (e.g. Berne Convention, Universal Copyright Convention, WIPO).

== Presidents grant international copyrights ==
The following is a timeline of presidents granting copyright to other countries:

- July 1, 1891: Belgium, France, Switzerland, Great Britain and its colonies by Benjamin Harrison
- April 15, 1892: German Empire by Benjamin Harrison
- October 31, 1892: Italy by Benjamin Harrison
- May 8, 1893: Denmark by Grover Cleveland
- July 20, 1893: Portugal by Grover Cleveland
- July 10, 1895: Spain by Grover Cleveland
- February 27, 1896: Mexico by Grover Cleveland
- May 25, 1896: Chile by Grover Cleveland
- October 19, 1899: Costa Rica by William McKinley
- November 20, 1899: The Netherlands by William McKinley
- November 17, 1903: Cuba by Theodore Roosevelt
- July 1, 1905: Norway by Theodore Roosevelt

The Copyright Act of 1909 had its own prescriptions for extending copyright to other countries.

== See also ==
- Bilateral copyright agreements of the United States
