= Copyright Clause =

Clause of the U.S. constitution allowing intellectual property protection

The Copyright Clause (also known as the Intellectual Property Clause, Copyright and Patent Clause, or the Progress Clause) describes an enumerated power listed in the United States Constitution (Article I, Section 8, Clause 8).

The clause, which is the basis of copyright and patent laws in the United States, states that:

[the United States Congress shall have power] To promote the Progress of Science and useful Arts, by securing for limited Times to Authors and Inventors the exclusive Right to their respective Writings and Discoveries.

== History ==
On August 18, 1787, the Constitutional Convention was in the midst of a weeks-long stretch of proposals to establish what would become the enumerated powers of the United States Congress. Three such proposals made on that day addressed what are now lumped together under intellectual property rights. One, by Charles Pinckney was "to secure to authors exclusive rights for a limited time" based upon the Statute of Anne. The other two were made by James Madison, who had previously served on a committee of the Congress established under the Articles of Confederation which had encouraged the individual states to adopt copyright legislation. Madison proposed that the Constitution permit Congress "to secure to literary authors their copyrights for a limited time", or, in the alternative, "to encourage, by proper premiums & Provisions, the advancement of useful knowledge and discoveries".

Both proposals were referred to the Committee of Detail, which reported back on September 5, 1787, with a proposal containing the current language of the clause. No record exists to explain the exact choice of words selected by the Committee on Detail, whose task was essentially no more than creating a draft Constitution by arranging the proposals that had been made into the most appropriate language. On September 17, 1787, the members of the Convention unanimously agreed to the proposed language, without debate, and this language was incorporated into the Constitution.

== Effect ==
The clause was interpreted as two distinct powers: the power to secure for limited times to authors the exclusive right to their writings is the basis for U.S. copyright law, and the power to secure for limited times to inventors the exclusive rights to their discoveries is the basis for U.S. patent law. Because the clause contains no language under which Congress may protect trademarks, those are instead protected under the Commerce Clause. Some terms in the clause are used in archaic meanings, potentially confusing modern readers. For example, "useful Arts" does not refer to artistic endeavors, but rather to the work of artisans, people skilled in a manufacturing craft; "Sciences" refers not only to fields of modern scientific inquiry but rather to all knowledge.

The Copyright Clause is "the only clause that comes with its own, built-in justification". The United States Supreme Court has decided numerous cases interpreting the text.

Furthermore, the clause only permits protection of the writings of authors and the discoveries of inventors. Hence, writings may only be protected to the extent that they are original, and "inventions" must be truly inventive and not merely obvious improvements on existing knowledge. The term "writings of authors" appears to exclude non-human authorship such as painting by chimpanzees and computer code written by programmed computers.

Although perpetual copyrights and patents are prohibited—the language specifies "limited times"—the Supreme Court has ruled in Eldred v. Ashcroft (2003) that repeated extensions to the term of copyright do not constitute a perpetual copyright. In that case, the United States Supreme Court rejected a challenge to the Sonny Bono Copyright Term Extension Act, also known pejoratively as the "Mickey Mouse Protection Act." Petitioners in that case argued that successive retroactive extensions of copyright were functionally unlimited and hence violated the limited times language of the clause. Justice Ginsburg, writing for the Court, rejected this argument, reasoning that the terms provided by the Act were limited in duration and noted that Congress had a long history of granting retroactive extensions.

== See also ==
- United States Constitution
- Copyright
- Letters patent
- United States copyright law
- United States patent law
- Stanford v. Roche
