= List of copyright case law =

The following is a list of cases that deal with issues of concern to copyright in various jurisdictions. Some of these cases are leading English cases as the law of copyright in various Commonwealth jurisdictions developed out of English law while these countries were colonies of the British Empire. Other cases provide background in areas of copyright law that may be of interest for the legal reasoning or the conclusions they reach.

== Australia ==
- Victoria Park Racing & Recreation Grounds Co Ltd v Taylor, idea-expression divide
- Cuisenaire v Reed, (a literary work cannot be infringed by a three-dimensional reproduction)
- Pacific Film Laboratories v Commissioner of Tax, considered negative rights - the power to prevent the making of a physical thing by copying.
- Zeccola v Universal City Studios Inc, there is no copyright in the idea of a theme or a story, but there may be a time where a combination of events and characters reaches sufficient complexity as to give rise to dramatic work copyright
- Computer Edge Pty Ltd v Apple Computer Inc, (test in Exxon for literary work is "not intended to establish a comprehensive or exhasutive definition of literary work for copyright purposes" per Mason and Wilson JJ)
- CBS Records v Gross, (a cover version of a song can be an original work itself capable of copyright protection)
- Greenfield Products Pty Ltd v Rover-Scott Bonnar Ltd, (1990) 17 IPR 417 per Pincus J, the drive mechanism of a law mower was not a sculpture
- Yumbulul v Reserve Bank of Australia (Morning Star Pole ten-dollar note case), copyright law does not provide adequate protection of Aboriginal community claims to regulate the reproduction and use of works which are essentially communal in origin
- Autodesk Inc v Dyason (No.2), (1993) 111 ALR 385 (the idea-expression divide is the "dominant principle in copyright law" per Mason CJ: "when the expression of any idea is inseparable from its function, it forms part of the idea and is not entitled to the protection of copyright" per Dawson J)
- Sega Enterprises Ltd v Galaxy Electronics Pty Ltd, interactive video games involving computer-generated images are cinematograph films as defined in s 10 of the Copyright Act 1968.

== Canada ==
- Muzak Corp. v. CAPAC, [1953], 2 S.C.R. 45 (authorization as infringement)
- Canadian Admiral Corp. v. Rediffusion Inc., [1954] Ex. C.R. 382 (performance in public)
- Cuisenaire v. South West Imports Ltd., [1968] 1 Ex C.R. 493
- Snow v. The Eaton Centre Ltd. (1982), 70 C.P.R. (2d) 105 (Ont. H.C.) (moral rights)
- DRG Inc. v. Datafile Ltd. (1987) 18 C.P.R. (3d) 538
- Apple Computer Inc. v. Mackintosh Computers Ltd., [1990], 2 S.C.R. 209 (copyright in computer programs)
- Prise de Parole Inc. v. Guerin, [1995], F.C.J. No. 1583 (moral rights and damages)
- Gould Estate v. Stoddart Publishing Co. Ltd. (1996), 74 C.P.R. (3d) 206 (rights of personality and fixation)
- Delrina Corp. v. Triolet Systems Inc. (2002), 58 OR (3d) 339 (merger doctrine and copyright in software)
- Théberge v. Galerie d'Art du Petit Champlain Inc., [2002], 2 S.C.R. 336 (Canadian definition of "reproduction")
- CCH Canadian Ltd. v. Law Society of Upper Canada 2004, SCC 13 (originality standard, secondary infringement, and fair dealing rights)
- Society of Composers, Authors and Music Publishers of Canada v. Canadian Association of Internet Providers, 2004 SCC 45 (ISPs as common carriers and status of caches)
- BMG Canada Inc. v. Doe, 2005 FCA 193 (privacy rights of filesharers)
- Robertson v. Thomson Corp., 2006 SCC 43 (ownership and licensing of collective works in electronic databases)
- Entertainment Software Association v. Society of Composers, Authors and Music Publishers of Canada, 2012 SCC 34 (holding that downloads engaged only reproduction rights and not communication rights)
- Rogers Communications Inc. v. Society of Composers, Authors and Music Publishers of Canada, 2012 SCC 35 (clarifying the meaning of "communication to the public" in the context of online streaming music)
- Society of Composers, Authors and Music Publishers of Canada v. Bell Canada, 2012 SCC 36 (clarifying fair dealing in the context of streamed music)
- Alberta (Education) v. Canadian Copyright Licensing Agency (Access Copyright), 2012 SCC 37 (applying the fair dealing to photocopied textbooks in public schools)
- Re:Sound v. Motion Picture Theatre Associations of Canada, 2012 SCC 38 (clarifying the definition of "sound recording" in the context of soundtracks of cinematographic works)
- Cinar Corporation v. Robinson, 2013 SCC 73 (copyright resides in proposals, treatments and formats, and infringement can occur when subsequent audiovisual works use their elements without ever actually literally copying them)

== France ==
- Societe Le Chant du Monde v. Societe Fox Europe and Societe Fox Americaine Twentieth Century Cour d'appel, Paris, Jan. 13, 1953, D.A. 1954, 16, 80, held in favor of the plaintiffs due to the very strong moral rights regime in France.

== India ==
- Pine Labs Pvt Ltd vs Gemalto Terminals India Pvt Limited - in FAO(OS) 635 of 2009 decided by DB Delhi High Court on 3.8.2011 (https://web.archive.org/web/20120201004419/http://lobis.nic.in/dhc/AKS/judgement/01-10-2011/AKS03082011FAOOS6352009.pdf Pine Labs Pvt Ltd vs Gemalto Terminals India Ltd and others): In the absence of the period of assignment or territory of assignment being specified, the assignment is deemed to be for 5 years and territory is deemed to be the territory of India as per section 19(5) and 19(6) of Copyright Act. After the period of 5 years, copyright reverts to assignor.
- THE CHANCELLOR, MASTERS & SCHOLARS OF UNIVERSITY OF OXFORD & ORS Versus RAMESHWARI PHOTOCOPY SERVICES & ORS last judgement on December 9, 2016 was by Delhi Highcourt.

== Japan ==
- "Winny copyright infringement case" (2011) Supreme Court Hei 21(A) 1900

== New Zealand ==
- Green v. Broadcasting Corp of NZ (1989) APIC 90-590: Privy Council definition of "dramatic works": " a dramatic work must have sufficient unity to be capable of performance"

== United Kingdom ==
- Gyles v Wilcox (1740) 3 Atk. 143; 26 Eng. Rep. 489 (a fair abridgement of a work is not copyright infringement)
- Entick v Carrington (1765) 95 ER 807 (authorities have no power which is not explicitly given to them by law; repercussions far beyond exclusive rights)
- Millar v. Taylor (1769) 4 Burr 2303; 98 ER 201 (copyright is perpetual)
- Donaldson v. Beckett (1774) 4 Burr 2408; 98 ER 257 (copyright is not perpetual)
- Bach v. Longman (1777) 2 Cowper 623 (musical compositions are protected as a form of writing)
- Dick v. Yates (1881) 18 Ch D 76 (a title is not long enough to constitute a literary work)
- Kenrick v. Lawrence (1890) L.R. QBD 99
- Hollingrake v. Truswell [1894] Ch. 420
- Walter v. Lane [1900] AC 539 ("reporter's copyright")
- Corelli v. Grey (1913) 29 TLR 570 (four reasons for clear objective similarity between works)
- University of London Press Ltd. v. University Tutorial Press Ltd. [1916] 2 Ch. 601
- Re Dickens (1934) 1 Ch 267
- Hawkes & Son (London) Ltd v. Paramount Film Service Ltd [1934] 1 Ch 593 (the Colonel Bogey case - infringement of copyright occurs when "a substantial, a vital and an essential part" of a work is copied, per Lord Slesser)
- Jennings v. Stephens [1936] Ch. 469 ("performance in public" as infringement)
- Donahue v. Allied Newspapers Ltd (1938) Ch 106 ["idea-expression divide"]
- Ladbroke (Football) Ltd v. William Hill (Football) Ltd [1964]1 WLR 273
- LB (Plastics) Ltd. v. Swish Products Ltd. [1979] RPC 551 (the basis of copyright protection is that "one man must not be able to appropriate the result of another's labour")
- Exxon Corp v. Exxon Insurance Consultants International (1981) 3 All ER 241 [Exxon name has no copyright]
- Express Newspapers v. News (UK) Ltd (1990) 18 IPR 201 (confirming Walter v. Lane)
- Lucasfilm Ltd v Ainsworth [2011] UKSC 39 (on whether a film prop can be a sculpture)
- Temple Island Collections Ltd v New English Teas Ltd [2012] EWPCC 1 (revising the originality standard)

== United States ==
Note: if no court name is given, according to convention, the case is from the Supreme Court of the United States. Supreme Court rulings are binding precedent across the United States; Circuit Court rulings are binding within a certain portion of it (the circuit in question); District Court rulings are not binding precedent, but may still be referred to by other courts.

Case name	Reporter	Court/Year	Findings
Wheaton v. Peters	33 U.S. (8 Pet.) 591	1834	There is no such thing as common law copyright and one must observe the formalities to secure a copyright.
Folsom v. Marsh	9. F.Cas. 342 (C.C.D. Mass. 1841)	1841	Fair use.
Baker v. Selden	101 U.S. 99	1879	Idea-expression divide.
Burrow-Giles Lithographic Co. v. Sarony	111 U.S. 53	1884	Congress's extension of copyright protection to photography was within scope of Copyright Clause.
Bleistein v. Donaldson Lithographing Co.	188 U.S. 239	1903	Art in advertisements is protected by copyright
White-Smith Music Publishing Company v. Apollo Company	209 U.S. 1	1908	Reproduction of the sounds of musical instruments playing music for which copyright granted not a violation of the copyright.
Bobbs-Merrill Co v. Straus	210 U.S. 339	1908	No license to use copyrighted material. License cannot extend holder's rights beyond statute defined by Congress.
Bauer & Cie. v. O'Donnell	229 U.S. 1	1913	Differences between patent and copyright defined also prohibits a license from extending holder's rights beyond statute.
Macmillan Co. v. King	223 F. 862	D.Mass. 1914	Limits of fair use with respect to an educational context and to summaries.
Nutt v. National Institute Inc.	31 F.2d 236	2d Cir. 1929	It is not the subject that is protected by copyright. It is the treatment of a subject that is protected.
Nichols v. Universal Pictures Corp.	45 F.2d 119	2d Cir. 1930	No copyright for "stock characters", but those sufficiently developed by author are eligible.
Cain v. Universal Pictures	47 F.Supp. 1013	S. Dist. Calif 1942	Scènes à faire
Shostakovich v. Twentieth Century-Fox Film Corp.	196 Misc. 67, 80 N.Y.S.2d 575 (N.Y. Sup. Ct. 1948), aff'd 275 A.D. 692, 87 N.Y.S.2d 430 (1949)	1948–9	No moral rights in public domain works.
Alfred Bell & Co. v. Catalda Fine Arts, Inc.	191 F.2d 99	2d. Cir. 1951	Variations of works in the public domain can be copyrighted if the new "author" contributed something more than a "merely trivial" variation, but no large measure of novelty is necessary.
National Comics Publications v. Fawcett Publications	191 F.2d 594 (1951), clarified 198 F.2d 927 (1952)	2d Cir. 1951–2	Derivative works; an author does not forfeit his copyright to a piece of intellectual property if his work is contracted to another who fails to properly copyright works which incorporate the original property (obsoleted by Copyright Act of 1976).
F. W. Woolworth Co. v. Contemporary Arts, Inc.	344 U.S. 228	1952	Provided wide latitude to judges when determining legal remedies based on the facts of the case.
Mazer v. Stein	347 U.S. 201	1954	Extended copyright protection to applied art.
Peter Pan Fabrics v. Martin Weiner Corp.	274 F.2d 487	2d. Cir. 1960	Extended copyright protection to fabric prints
Irving Berlin et al. v. E.C. Publications, Inc.	329 F. 2d 541	2d. Cir. 1964	Parody.
Fortnightly Corp. v. United Artists	392 U.S. 390	1968	Television broadcasters "perform" copyrighted works. Viewers do not perform. CATV was more like a viewer than a broadcaster and did not infringe when rebroadcasting copyrighted works.
Roth Greeting Cards v. United Card Co	429 F.2d 1106	9th Cir. 1970	Copyright may be infringed when total concept and feel is the same
Goldstein v. California	412 U.S. 546	1973	State anti-record piracy statutes do not violate the Copyright Clause
Williams & Wilkins Co. v. United States	487 F.2d 1345	Ct. Cl. 1973	Libraries' photocopying for research was fair use.
Elektra Records Co. v. Gem Electronic Distributors, Inc.	360 F. Supp. 821	E.D.N.Y. 1973	Secondary liability for infringement existed where store owner rented records to customers who also bought blank tape
Twentieth Century Music Corp. v. Aiken	422 U.S. 151	1975	Playing a radio broadcast of a copyrighted work at a business was not copyright infringement Radio reception does not constitute a "performance" of copyrighted material.
Reyher v. Children's Television Workshop	533 F.2d 87	2d Cir. 1976	The essence of infringement lies in taking not a general theme but its particular expression
Gilliam v. American Broadcasting	538 F.2d 14	2d Cir. 1976	Moral rights infringed by unauthorized editing of TV show
Sid & Marty Krofft Television Productions Inc. v. McDonald's Corp.	562 F.2d 1157	9th Cir. 1977	Extrinsic and intrinsic tests may be used to determine substantial similarity
Wainwright Securities v. Wall Street Transcript Corp	558 F.2d 91	2d Cir. 1977	The essence or purpose of legitimate journalism is the reporting of objective facts or developments, not the appropriation of the form of expression used by the news source
Walt Disney Productions v. Air Pirates	581 F.2d 751	9th Cir. 1978	Cartoon characters are copyrightable outside the works in which they appear; use of them without significant alteration in parody or satire is not fair use
Miller v. Universal City Studios, Inc.	650 F.2d 1365	5th Cir. 1981	A writer's research is not copyrightable.
Schnapper v. Foley	667 F.2d 102	D.C. Cir. 1981	Affirmed that copyright exists for works created by contractors for the US government.
Stern Electronics, Inc. v. Kaufman	669 F.2d 852	2d Cir. 1982	Copyright on computer programs includes images and sounds as well as the computer code.
Encyclopaedia Britannica Educational Corp. v. Crooks	542 F.Supp. 1156	W.D.N.Y. 1982	Unlicensed reuse of videos recorded from public television broadcasts for noncommercial educational purposes is infringing.
See v. Durang	711 F.2d 141	9th Cir. 1983	Copying deleted or so disguised as to be unrecognizable is not copying
Apple Computer, Inc. v. Franklin Computer Corp.	714 F.2d 1240	3rd Cir. 1983	Computer software is protected by copyright (affirmed and obsoleted by subsequent legislation).
Sony Corp. of America v. Universal City Studios, Inc. (the "Betamax case")	464 U.S. 417	1984	Products with substantial non-infringing uses (video recorders) may be sold even if they can be used illicitly. Private, non-commercial recording of programs for time-shifting purposes is fair use.
Selle v. Gibb	741 F.2nd 896	7th Circ 1984	Where there is lack of evidence of access, access can be inferred only if striking similarities preclude independent creation
Dowling v. United States	473 U.S. 207	1985	Copyright infringement is not theft, conversion, or fraud; illegally made copies are not stolen goods.
Harper & Row v. Nation Enterprises	471 U.S. 539	1985	The interest served by republication of a public figure's account of an event is not sufficient to permit nontransformative fair use.
Fisher v. Dees	794 F.2d 432	9th Cir. 1986	Parody of song performance is legitimate fair use
Whelan v. Jaslow	797 F.2d 1222	3rd Cir. 1986	Copyright protection of computer programs may extend beyond the programs' literal code to their structure, sequence and organization
Broderbund v. Unison	648 F. Supp. 1127, 1133	N.D. Cal. 1986	Copyright may extend to the look and feel of a computer program's display
Steinberg v. Columbia Pictures Industries, Inc.	663 F. Supp. 706	S.D.N.Y. 1987	Derivative works.
Salinger v. Random House	811 F.2d 90	2d Cir. 1987	An author has a right to protect the expressive content of his unpublished writings for the term of his copyright, and that right prevails over a claim of fair use under "ordinary circumstances"
Anderson v. Stallone	11 USPQ2D 1161	C.D. Cal 1989	Derivative works.
Community for Creative Non-Violence v. Reid	490 U.S. 730	1989	Works for hire.
Wright v. Warner Books	953 F.2d 731	2d Cir. 1991	Sparing use of creative expression from unpublished letters and journals may constitute fair use
Basic Books, Inc. v. Kinko's Graphics Corporation	758 F. Supp. 1522	S.D.N.Y. 1991	Articles copied for educational use are not necessarily fair use. First case where transformative use was raised as a defense.
Advent Sys. Ltd. v. Unisys Corp	925 F.2d 670, 675-76	3d Cir. 1991	The sale of software is the sale of a good within the meaning of the Uniform Commercial Code.
Downriver Internists v. Harris Corp	929 F.2d 1147, 1150	6th Cir. 1991	The sale of software is the sale of a good within the meaning of the Uniform Commercial Code.
Feist Publications v. Rural Telephone Service	499 U.S. 340	1991	Affirmed the need for a minimal amount of creativity before a work is copyrightable. "Sweat of the brow" alone is not sufficient to bestow copyright.
Grand Upright Music, Ltd. v. Warner Bros. Records, Inc.	780 F. Supp. 182	SDNY 1991	Music sampling is generally copyright infringement.
Step-Saver Data Systems, Inc. v. Wyse Technology	939 F.2d 91	3rd Cir. 1991	The need to characterize the transaction as a license to use software is "largely anachronistic.".
Sega v. Accolade	982 F.2d 1510	9th Cir. 1992	Reverse engineering of computer code is fair use
Computer Associates Int. Inc. v. Altai Inc.	982 F.2d 693	2d Cir. 1992	"Substantial similarity" is required for copyright infringement to occur. Established the Abstraction-Filtration-Comparison test, which lays out the steps to follow when extricating copyrightable expression from uncopyrightable elements of the same work.
Lewis Galoob Toys, Inc. v. Nintendo of America, Inc.	780 F. Supp. 1283	9th Cir. 1992	Consumers may modify purchased computer games for their own use.
Rogers v. Koons	960 F.2d 301	2d Cir. 1992	Fair use and parody; changing medium and dimensionality of copied work is not sufficiently transformative to be fair use.
MAI Systems Corp. v. Peak Computer, Inc.	991 F.2d 511	9th Cir. 1993	RAM ("working memory") copies of computer programs are governed by copyright.
Apple Computer, Inc. v. Microsoft Corp.	35 F.3d 1435	9th Cir. 1994	Certain components of computer programs' graphical user interfaces are not copyrightable.
Campbell v. Acuff-Rose Music, Inc.	510 U.S. 569	1994	Commercial parody can be fair use; transformative use implicitly recognized as part of fair use under first factor ("purpose and character of the use")
Carter v. Helmsley-Spear Inc.	861 F. Supp. 303	S.D.N.Y., 1994	Interpreting moral rights provisions of U.S. Visual Artists Rights Act (overturned for other reasons: 71 F.3d 77 (2d Cir. 1995), cert. denied 116 S. Ct. 1824 (1996)).
United States v. LaMacchia	871 F.Supp. 535	D. Mass 1994	Gave rise to LaMacchia Loophole where criminal charges of fraud or copyright infringement would be dismissed, so long as there was no profit motive involved. The NET Act was passed in 1997 as a direct response to LaMacchia.
Lotus v. Borland	49 F.3d 807	1st Cir. 1995	Software interfaces per se are "methods of operation" and are not covered by copyright.
Self-Realization Fellowship Church v. Ananda Church	59 F.3d 902, 910	9th Cir. 1995	Renewal rights are not assignable.
American Geophysical Union v. Texaco, Inc.	60 F.3d 913	2d Cir. 1995	Bulk photocopying of academic journal articles by research library is not fair use where, unlike Williams & Wilkins Co. v. United States (above), purpose of research library was private commercial gain. First appellate-level case to consider transformative use.
Religious Technology Center v. Netcom	907 F. Supp. 1361	N.D. Cal. 1995	Immunity of copyright liability for Internet Intermediaries.
Twin Books Corp. v. Walt Disney Co.	83 F.3d 1162, 38	9th Cir. 1996	Foreign works published before 1978 did not establish US copyright until published in the US or with US copyright formalities.
Applied Info. Mgmt., Inc, v. Icart	976 Supp. 149, 155	E.D.N.Y. 1997	The sale of software is the sale of a good. Case was dropped.
Itar-Tass Russian News Agency v. Russian Kurier, Inc.	153 F.3d 82	2d Cir. 1998	Jurisdiction with closest association to putative owner applies to determine copyright ownership.
Castle Rock Entertainment, Inc. v. Carol Publishing Group Inc.	153 F.3d 132	2d Cir. 1998	Trivia derived from a copyrighted work is not sufficiently transformative to be fair use on its own.
Micro Star v. FormGen Inc.	154 F.3d 1107	9th Cir. 1998	Video game mods are derivative works
The Yankee Candle Co. v. New England Candle Co.	14 F.Supp.2d 154	District Court of Massachusetts 1998	Internal structure does not qualify as "building" under 17 U.S.C. § 101.
Bridgeman Art Library Ltd. v. Corel Corporation	36 F. Supp. 2d 191	S.D.N.Y. 1999	"Slavish copying" is inherently uncreative and cannot confer copyright.
Estate of Martin Luther King, Jr., Inc. v. CBS, Inc.	194 F.3d 1211	11th Cir. 1999	Giving a public speech is not public-domain publication under the 1909 Copyright Act.
Microsystems Software, Inc. v. Scandinavia Online AB		District Court of Massachusetts 2000	Settled out of court; illustrated problems of reverse engineering and the need for clear copyright notices in IT code
Sony Computer Entertainment, Inc. v. Connectix Corp.	203 F.3d 596	9th Cir.	Copying of BIOS code for use in an emulator is fair use.
Novell, Inc. v. CPU Distrib., Inc.	2000 US Dist. Lexis. 9975	SD Tex. 2000	The first-sale doctrine applies to software.
UMG v. MP3.com	2000 U.S. Dist. LEXIS 5761	S.D.N.Y. 2000	Distribution of copyrighted music without permission of the copyright holders is infringement even if the downloader already owns a copy of the music.
A & M Records, Inc. v. Napster, Inc.	239 F.3d 1004	9th Cir. 2001	Knowingly failing to take steps to prevent infringement, while benefiting from said infringement, is grounds for contributory infringement. Also, users of file-sharing services infringe by both uploading and downloading works without permission.
New York Times Company v. Tasini	533 U.S. 483	2001	Freelance journalists did not grant electronic republication rights for collective work.
SoftMan Products Co. v. Adobe Systems Inc.	CV 00-04161 DDP (AJWx)	C.D.C.A. 2001	The first-sale doctrine applies to software.
Suntrust v. Houghton Mifflin	252 F. 3d 1165	11th Cir. 2001	Parody and fair use.
Universal City Studios, Inc. v. Reimerdes	273 F.3d 429	2d Cir. 2001	Affirmed the anti-circumvention provisions of the Digital Millennium Copyright Act.
Veeck v. Southern Building Code Congress Int'l	241 F.3d 398, 416	5th Cir. 2001	A private organization cannot assert copyright protection for its model codes, after the models have been adopted by a legislative body and become the law.
Kelly v. Arriba Soft Corporation	336 F.3d 811	9th Cir. 2003	Thumbnails and inline linking can be fair use.
Dastar Corp. v. Twentieth Century Fox Film Corp.	539 U.S. 23	2003	Trademark cannot preserve rights to a public domain work.
Eldred v. Ashcroft	537 U.S. 186	2003	Congress may retroactively extend the duration of works still under copyright, as long as the extension is limited.
Bowers v. Baystate Technologies, Inc.	320 F.3d 1317	Fed.Cir. 2003	Contracts freely entered into that apply restrictions to actions with copyrighted material otherwise permitted as fair use are enforceable.
NXIVM Corp. v. Ross Institute	364 F.3d 471	2nd Cir. 2004	Secondary use as part of critical document is sufficiently transformative fair use to overcome bad faith in original acquisition of material
CoStar v. LoopNet	373 F.3d 544	4th Cir. 2004	Internet service provider was found not liable for copyright infringement of photographs uploaded by subscribers, despite the screening process by an employee of the Internet service provider before the photographs were stored and displayed.
Arizona Cartridge Remanufacturers Association Inc. v. Lexmark International Inc.	03-16987 D.C. No. CV-01-04626SBA/JL OPINION	9th Cir. 2005	End User License Agreements on a physical box can be binding on consumers who signal their acceptance of the license agreement by opening the box.
Bridgeport Music, Inc. v. Dimension Films	410 F.3d 792	6th Cir. 2005	No de minimis exception for sampled music. "Get a license or do not sample. We do not see this as stifling creativity in any significant way."
Bill Graham Archives v. Dorling Kindersley, Ltd.	448 F.3d 605	2d Cir. 2005	Repurposing originally promotional images for use in historical work is sufficiently transformative to be fair use; invoking fair use after negotiating with rights holder is not bad faith.
MGM Studios, Inc. v. Grokster, Ltd.	545 U.S. 913	2005	Distributors of peer-to-peer file-sharing software can be liable for copyright infringement if there are "affirmative steps taken to foster infringement".
Mannion v. Coors Brewing Co.	377 F.Supp.2d 444	S.D.N.Y. 2005	Originality in rendition, timing and/or creation of the subject are grounds for copyrightability in a photograph.
Blanch v. Koons	467 F.3d 244	2d Cir. 2006	Reuse of magazine image in art collage was sufficiently transformative since a small portion of the original was used even more minimally in artwork. Context should be considered when evaluating transformative use.
Perfect 10 v. Google Inc	416 F. Supp. 2d 828	C.D. Cal. 2006	Thumbnails in Web searches were fair use. Framed inline images of full size were not infringing copies. (9th circuit reversed the DC's holding of no Fair Use)
Perfect 10 v. CCBill LLC	488 F.3d 1102	9th Cir. 2007	DMCA notification procedures place the burden of policing copyright infringement on the owners of the copyright. CDA Section 230 means only “federal intellectual property," and does not include state right of publicity claims.
Perfect 10 v. Visa	494 F.3d 788	9th Cir. 2007	A case about secondary copyright infringement
Kahle v. Gonzales	No. 04-17434	9th Cir. 2007	Congress did not alter the "traditional contours of copyright protection" by permitting automatic extension of copyrights.
Lenz v. Universal Music Corp.	572 F. Supp. 2d 1150	N.D. Cal. 2008	Rights holders must consider fair use before issuing a takedown notice. If the notice is issued in bad faith, the rights holder could be held liable for misrepresentation.
A.V. ex rel.Vanderhye v. iParadigms LLC	562 F.3d 630	4th Cir. 2009	Commercial online database of student papers for plagiarism detection purposes was fair use
MDY Industries v. Blizzard Entertainment	629 F. 3d 928	9th Cir. 2010	Addressing whether certain unlicensed acts are copyright infringement or merely violations of contract.
Reed Elsevier, Inc. v. Muchnick	559 U.S. 154	2010	Failure to register a copyright does not limit a Federal Court's jurisdiction over claims of infringement regarding unregistered works.
Ouellette v. Viacom International Inc.	CV 10–133–M–DWM–JCL; 2011 WL 1882780	D. Mont. 2011	The safe harbor provision of the DMCA does not provide a cause of action against service providers that take down videos.
Cambridge University Press v. Becker	1:2008cv01425	N.D. Ga. 2011	University's use of copyrighted material in e-reserves does not constitute direct or vicarious infringement.
Golan v. Holder	565 U.S. 302	2012	Congress may retroactively restore copyright in works that have fallen into the public domain. The Constitution gives broad discretion to Congress to decide how best to promote the "progress of science and the useful arts"
Kirtsaeng v. John Wiley & Sons, Inc.	133 S. Ct. 1351	2013	The first-sale doctrine applies to copies of copyrighted works lawfully made abroad.
Cariou v. Prince	714 F.3d 694	2d Cir. 2013	Work need not comment on the original, just present a "new aesthetic", to qualify as transformative use
Authors Guild, Inc. v. HathiTrust	755 F.3d 87	2d Cir. 2014	Search and accessibility are fair use of digitized books.
Star Athletica, LLC v. Varsity Brands, Inc.	580 U.S. ___	2017	Simple geometric patterns on clothing may be copyrightable if they are not related to the clothing's function and would be copyrightable in any medium
Google LLC v. Oracle America, Inc.	593 U.S. ___ , 141 S. Ct. 1183	2021	Limited copying of implementing code from API software to put to a different purpose is transformative and fair use.
Unicolors, Inc. v. H&M Hennes & Mauritz, L.P.	595 U.S. ___	2022	Lack of factual or legal knowledge can excuse an inaccuracy in copyright registration
Andy Warhol Foundation for the Visual Arts, Inc. v. Goldsmith	598 U.S. 508	2023	Bar for transformative use is higher where copied work is used for substantially similar purpose; when evaluating transformative use claim courts must consider the specific context in which the claimed transformation takes place.

== See also ==
- List of trademark case law
- List of patent case law
