= Fashion design copyright in the United States =

In the 2017 Supreme Court case. Star Athletica, LLC v. Varsity Brands, Inc., it was ruled that Fashion design can be covered by copyright.

...an artistic feature of the design of a useful article is eligible for copyright protection if the feature (1) can be perceived as a two- or three-dimensional work of art separate from the useful article and (2) would qualify as a protectable pictorial, graphic, or sculptural work either on its own or in some other medium if imagined separately from the useful article.

== Background ==
=== Domestic ===
The beginnings of copyright law began with editorial copyrights in the 1750s. Since then, we have had extensive advancements within society that have called for legislative additions to the initial idea of what should and should not be copyrighted. In 1932 the Fashion Originators Guild of America unified in order to prevent further knock offs by requiring designers to submit their designs for cataloguing, and by “red carding” those stores and businesses that were found to reproduce previously submitted designs under their own name and for their own profit. By red carding these retailers, they essentially blacklisted stores to institute boycotts and dissolve the offending business. However, in 1941 their actions were ruled illegal through violating antitrust laws and monopolizing the competition and so the guild disbanded. The issue continued to be under debate as designers through the years consistently felt blows in revenue as cheaper versions of their designs flew off the mass marketed racks. Attempts at creating a bill to combat these knock offs rose and fell, until various supporters grabbed hold of ideas to form a tangible and arguable legislation.

=== International ===
Fashion design copyright laws in Europe have been known as early as in the 15th century. French king Francis I gave out specific privileges related to the production of textiles. By 1711, in Lyon, illegalities were already being defined in regards to fashion materials, and in 1787, in England and Scotland fashion designers had fruitfully pushed their needs for protection into basic legislation. In 1876 Germany began protecting fashion patterns as well as models, and in 2002 European regulation on designs that were new and provided an aspect of fresh character or aesthetic were brought under protection. From 2004 to 2006 the “total production volume for clothing decreased by about 5% each year… [and by] 2006 the European union trade deficit for clothing was at 33.7 billion.” These statistics show that while there are benefits of their advanced design legislation, the economic and external factors still hindered their industry growth in ways the U.S. can empathize with. As 2007 came to a close, WIPO, or the World Intellectual Property Organization, had registered twenty-nine international designs.

== Legislation ==
In 1998, Representative Howard Coble of North Carolina was the one to use the example of boat hulls in his argument for fashion design protection. A statute had been added to the copyright legislation describing boat hull designs to be included in the protective act, and Coble expressed how the same types of ideas applied to hull designs could be used for fashion designs. In 2006 the 109th congress found themselves facing the first supported bill asking for protection of fashion designs. This attempt, however, was stalled in congress. A second attempt was made in 2010, and now yet another attempt stands before the congress of 2013, hoping to be pushed through this final time. The original proposed legislation regarding fashion design copyrights put before congress in 2006 were as follows. “A fashion design is subject to protection under this chapter… A ‘fashion design’ is the appearance as a whole of an article of apparel, including its ornamentation. The term ‘apparel’ means- an article of men’s, women’s, or children’s clothing, including undergarments, outerwear, gloves, footwear, and headgear; handbags, purses, and tote bags; belts’ and eyeglass frames. In the case of a fashion design, embodied in a useful article that was made public by the designer or owner in the United States or a foreign country more than 3 months before the date of the application for registration under this chapter. A fashion design shall continue for a term of 3 years beginning on the date of the commencement… [Infringement can be claimed on] reasonable grounds to know that protection for the design is claimed”. The Innovative Design Protection and Piracy Act, as expressed above, outlined what constitutes as a protectable fashion design, something that had been under heavy debate.

== Affected designers and manufacturers ==
Designers included in the list of those with stolen designs and who are part of the campaign for protection include but are not limited to: Diane Von Furstenberg, Narciso Rodriquez, Zac Posen, and Yves Saint Laurent. The fight is said to be not against lower priced merchants selling clothes that follow the seasonal fashion trends, but against blatant copying of runway looks, such as dresses or jackets that use the exact color, detail, and structure as pieces that had already debuted under previous designers. These less expensive replicates of previous designs are impacting the luxury business in ways that cause decline in the revenue for luxury designers. Instead of spending the money on a higher priced garment, they buy a cheaper duplicate from a mass producer. In this sense, the Council of Fashion Designers of American argues that their members customers are being stolen by the cheaper knock offs producers.

When original designers are confronted about the issue of price, they justify their expensiveness by means of the creative effort that goes into both the design and production process. This clearly includes the materials and methods used to produce top quality pieces to sell to consumers. Fashion is in all senses a distinct form of art. There are bad pieces and good pieces, but even a bad or plain painting would still be labeled as artwork. Designer pieces are expensive not only because of the brand name, but also the innovation and creativity of the product.

European designers at home have rights to their designs through the European Union, and they want those same protections for their designs in the United States. In Europe, fashion designers receive twenty-five years of protection for a just revealed design in contrast to the current American proposed cap of three years. In other words, they receive a generous amount of protection in one market and get absolutely nothing in the other.

== Court cases ==
=== Yves Saint Laurent v. Ralph Lauren ===
In 1994, Yves St Laurent and Ralph Lauren went to court over a specific tuxedo dress that the accused had theoretically designed after a YSL version. The ultimate outcome was the payment of $300,000 from Ralph Lauren to the House of YSL. While the court in question was in Paris, this shows the beginnings of public courts taking serious interest and incentive to protect designers from copying one another. A second example from 1994 took place in Chicago, where the company I.B Diffusion L.P. accused Montgomery Ward L.P. of knocking off a specific sweater design and mass-producing it to sell for themselves. This case provides an additional example of American designers facing the challenge of competitors knocking off their designs.

The argument here describes the economic idea of competition. Without competition there leaves no room for businesses to strive for better, newer products in order to outsell each other (Fischer par. 2). When arguing against legislation, many lump copycat retailers and mass producers into this category of necessary competition. Through imitation of the original products, it “makes it available to a greater number of consumers.” The fact that larger quantities of people have access not only to the product but also to knowledge of the product increases the original designers successful market base. In a roundabout method, imitation is type of advertising for the real design.

An argument put forth for this case is that few to zero customers are actually stolen through knock off retailing. Knockoffs are targeted at a market of consumers who would not be buying the original pieces anyway. The degree of difference in price points from the original to the knock off means that the lower priced market consumers cannot afford the higher priced market products to begin with. In other words, designers and mass retailers cater to entirely different market segments that barely overlap. Not to mention, there is a certain amount of “piracy paradox”. When designs become mass-produced and so mass marketed, it causes market saturation to occur even sooner than it would otherwise. This means that the consumers become interested in designs and subsequently become disinterested faster, and so cause fashion cycles to speed up. The time between introduction of a style and decline of a style is decreasing. This allows designers to sell different styles more often, and so increase their overall profit.
