= Labor theory of copyright =

The labor theory of copyright, also known as the natural rights theory, is one of the most prominent theories of copyright, among others like the personality theory and the incentive/welfare theory. According to the labor theory, an individual has a right to the product of their labor, whether physical or intellectual. It is based on the John Locke's labor theory of property which says that persons are entitled to the fruits of their own labor, and by extension, intellectual property can be viewed as the fruits of an individual's mental labor. While the Lockean theory was originally intended for conventional forms of property, it can be extended to justify intellectual property in general and copyright in particular if we view an owner's claim to traditional forms of property as being analogous to an author's claims over their intellectual property.

== History and development ==
The labor theory is grounded in the Lockean idea of property which states that if you mix your labor with some resource that was commonly and freely available, or expend your labor generally, then you extend some part of yourself to the final product and therefore it should be yours. In doing so, you exclude anyone else's title to anything that contains your labor. Thus, Locke argues that "the 'labor' of his body and 'work' of his hands ... are properly his. Whatsoever, then, he removes out of the state that nature hath provided and left it in, he hath mixed his labor with it and joined to it something that is his own and thereby makes it his own property". Locke, however, puts two caveats to this theory of property. First, in order to justify property rights using the labor theory, you have to show that the 'non-waste' requirement is fulfilled, which means that the author should not take up more of the common resources available than they can fruitfully use — i.e. there should not be any waste of common resources. Second, there is the 'enough and as good' requirement which states that when the author/creator of a work acquires something from the common resources then they should make sure that such acquisition does not impair or infringe any other persons ability to make use these common resources.

== Justification of copyright on the basis of the labor theory ==
The labor theory of copyright is one of the most prominent theories of copyright, among others like the Incentive and the Personhood Theories. One reason for its popularity and widespread use in the justification of copyright law is that the arguments used in this theory have been part of the jurisprudential discourse on intellectual property for a long time. This is especially true in jurisdictions such as the United States, where these arguments have found basis in several legislations and constitutional provisions.

== Opposition to the labor theory ==
Several arguments have been made against the labor theory, with critics pointing out that property cannot be mixed with actions, and if original labor is important in the creation of a work, then any other use of that work or subsequent labor should be given the same rights as those given to the original author. These theories represent a more traditional justification of Intellectual property, which may be of diminishing relevance to present-day circumstances. Some critics, for example, question the very idea of having or owning property when talking about intellectual property. They argue that the works of authors should not be viewed as commodities to be owned but as a means of 'communication'.

== Treatment in different jurisdictions ==
The idea of rewarding authors for their labor was initially prominent in the United States jurisprudence, with many arguing that American society is based on the idea that people are entitled to enjoy the fruits of their labor in that they create something that has value. In the case of Mazer v. Stein Justice Stanley Forman Reed of the U.S. Supreme Court said that "sacrificial days devoted to ... creative activities deserves rewards commensurate with the services rendered". Justice Potter Stewart observed that "the immediate effect of our copyright law is to stimulate a fair return for an author's creative labor". While this concept was initially defended in a number of cases, it was ultimately rejected by the U.S. Supreme Court in the case of Feist Publications, Inc., v. Rural Telephone Service Co. In this case, the court considered one of the most prominent conceptions of the labor theory in copyright: the 'sweat of the brow' theory or the 'industrious collection' theory, which states that if labor has been put into the creation of a work, then it should be the property of the author. The court stated that it "distorts basic copyright principles in that it creates a monopoly in public domain materials without the necessary justification of protecting and encouraging the creation of 'writings' by authors".

In certain other jurisdictions, the 'sweat of the brow' theory as a component of the 'originality' requirement finds more prominence and is still accepted. For example, the Canadian Supreme Court, in the case of CCH Canadian Ltd. v. Law Society of Upper Canada, held that copyright should reward an author's effort as well. This theory has also gained wide acceptance in the United Kingdom and India.
