= FRLA =

FRLA may refer to:

- Federal Regulation of Lobbying Act of 1946, a statute enacted by the United States Congress to reduce the influence of lobbyists
- Frederick Law Olmsted National Historic Site, a United States National Historic Site located in Brookline, Massachusetts
- Florida Restaurant and Lodging Association
