= United States v. Harriss =

- Supreme Court of the United States

Argued October 19, 1953 Decided June 7, 1954
- Full case name: United States v. Harriss, et al.
- Citations: 347 U.S. 612 (more) 74 S. Ct. 808; 98 L. Ed. 989; 1954 U.S. LEXIS 2657

Case history
- Prior: Appeal from the United States District Court for the District of Columbia

Holding
- The Court upheld the act's constitutionality, but also narrowed the scope and application of the act.

Court membership
- Chief Justice Earl Warren Associate Justices Hugo Black · Stanley F. Reed; Felix Frankfurter · William O. Douglas; Robert H. Jackson · Harold H. Burton; Tom C. Clark · Sherman Minton

Case opinions
- Majority: Warren, joined by Reed, Frankfurter, Burton, Minton
- Dissent: Douglas, joined by Black
- Dissent: Jackson
- Clark took no part in the consideration or decision of the case.

Laws applied
- Regulation of Lobbying Act

United States v. Harriss, 347 U.S. 612 (1954), was a U.S. Supreme Court case applied directly to the Regulation of Lobbying Act.

== Proceedings and outcome ==
Lobbyists challenged the Regulation of Lobbying Act for being unconstitutionally vague and unclear. In Harriss, the Supreme Court responded by upholding the act's constitutionality, but also by narrowing the scope and application of the act. The Court ruled that the act applies only to paid lobbyists who directly communicate with members of Congress on pending or proposed federal legislation. This means that lobbyists who visit with congressional staff members rather than members of Congress themselves are not considered lobbyists. In addition, the act covers only attempts to influence the passage or defeat of legislation in Congress, and excludes other congressional activities. Further, the act applies to and restricts only individuals who spend at least half of their time lobbying.

== See also ==
- List of United States Supreme Court cases, volume 347
