= Fashion Originators' Guild of America v. FTC =

- Supreme Court of the United States

Argued February 10, 1941 Decided March 3, 1941
- Full case name: Fashion Originators' Guild of America v. FTC
- Citations: 312 U.S. 457 (more) 61 S. Ct. 703; 85 L. Ed. 949; 48 U.S.P.Q. 483

Case history
- Prior: 114 F.2d 80 (2d Cir. 1940); cert. granted, 311 U.S. 641 (1940).

Holding
- A practice short of a complete monopoly but which tends to create a monopoly and to deprive the public of the advantages from free competition in interstate trade, offends the policy of the Sherman Act.

Court membership
- Chief Justice Charles E. Hughes Associate Justices Harlan F. Stone · Owen Roberts; Hugo Black · Stanley F. Reed; Felix Frankfurter · William O. Douglas; Frank Murphy

Fashion Originators' Guild of America v. FTC, 312 U.S. 457 (1941), is a 1941 decision of the United States Supreme Court sustaining an order of the Federal Trade Commission against a boycott agreement (concerted refusal to deal) among manufacturers of "high-fashion" dresses. The purpose of the boycott was to suppress "style piracy" (unauthorized copying of original dress creations of Fashion Guild members). The FTC found the Fashion Guild in violation of § 5 of the FTC Act, because the challenged conduct was a per se violation of § 1 of the Sherman Act.

== Background ==
The Fashion Originators Guild of America (FOGA) and its members made and sold medium– and high–priced, fashionable women's dresses to retailers, who select their purchases from designs exhibited in show rooms in New York City. The members made their dresses from their own "original designs." The designs were not protected by patents or copyrights, which were not available for clothing in 1941, and therefore other dress manufacturers (so-called "style pirates") made and sold unauthorized copies.

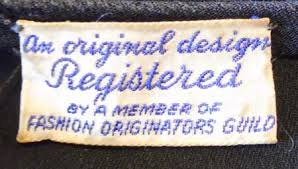
FOGA label from a 1930s dress

The Guild was organized in 1932 to protect its members from "piracy," which they said was an unfair and tortious invasion of their rights. "Because of these alleged wrongs, petitioners . . . combined among themselves to combat and, if possible, destroy all competition from the sale of garments which are copies of their original creations." The Guild and its members agreed to refuse to sell any dresses to retailers who purchased, or ordered to be manufactured, dresses which the Guild found embodied copies of its members' designs. For that purpose the Guild set up a "Piracy Committee," which decided which of the designs registered by its members were original. It then employed shoppers in various parts of the country who visited the shops of retailers and report delinquents: if a retailer was found to be selling "pirated designs," it must stop doing so, or else it would get no more dresses from the Guild's members; nor would it be allowed to see the designs exhibited in the Guild's New York show rooms. Retailers that co-operated with the Guild had to agree to accept the decision of the Piracy Committee, and to return to sellers any dresses that had been "pirated." Furthermore, they had to warrant to customers that the designs of the dresses they sold had not been "pirated." As a result of the Guild's efforts, approximately 12,000 retailers signed agreements to "cooperate" with the Guild's boycott program.

If the Guild, upon auditing a member's books, found that a manufacturer was selling to a retailer dealing in pirated designs, the manufacturer was heavily fined. (In one instance, a fine of $1,500 was imposed, and the Guild notified its membership that a fine of $5,000 would be assessed in case of future violation.) The Guild also regulated the discount the manufacturers could allow, prohibited their selling at retail, and cooperated with local guilds in regulating days upon which special sales could be held.

The FTC issued a complaint against FOGA in April 1936, held hearings, found the pattern of conduct described above an unfair method of competition, and "made an order appropriate to break up the combination," from which the Guild appealed.

== Ruling by Second Circuit ==
FOGA did not challenge the accuracy of the findings, "but on the contrary seeks to justify the combination." It argued that says that its actions "were necessary to protect the industry as a whole from 'demoralization' and the 'property' of its members from appropriation."

The Second Circuit, in an opinion by Judge Learned Hand, held that any common-law property right that the FOGA members had in their creations was lost upon publication. To embody a design in a dress or a fabric, and offer the dress for general sale was such a "publication"; therefore, the FOGA members had no property right against the copying by the so–called style pirates. "The Guild has therefore no . . . excuse for preventing other dressmakers from copying." Accordingly, the court said, "we are therefore to judge the Guild as a combination seeking to exclude outsiders from a market to which they have as lawful access as it has itself." A boycott can be justifiable only if it is in self-defense against a crime, tort, or breach of contract. "But that excuse does not extend to a boycott of retailers who buy dresses copied from 'published' designs; if that is to be justified, the excuse must be found elsewhere." The court could find no other excuse, and it observed that the effect of the boycott by the FOGA members "puts into their hands collectively the power to control the supply and with it the price," to the detriment of consumers. The court perceived each dress design as the subject of a monopoly (i.e., relevant submarket), so that "for these reasons the combination was unlawful per se."

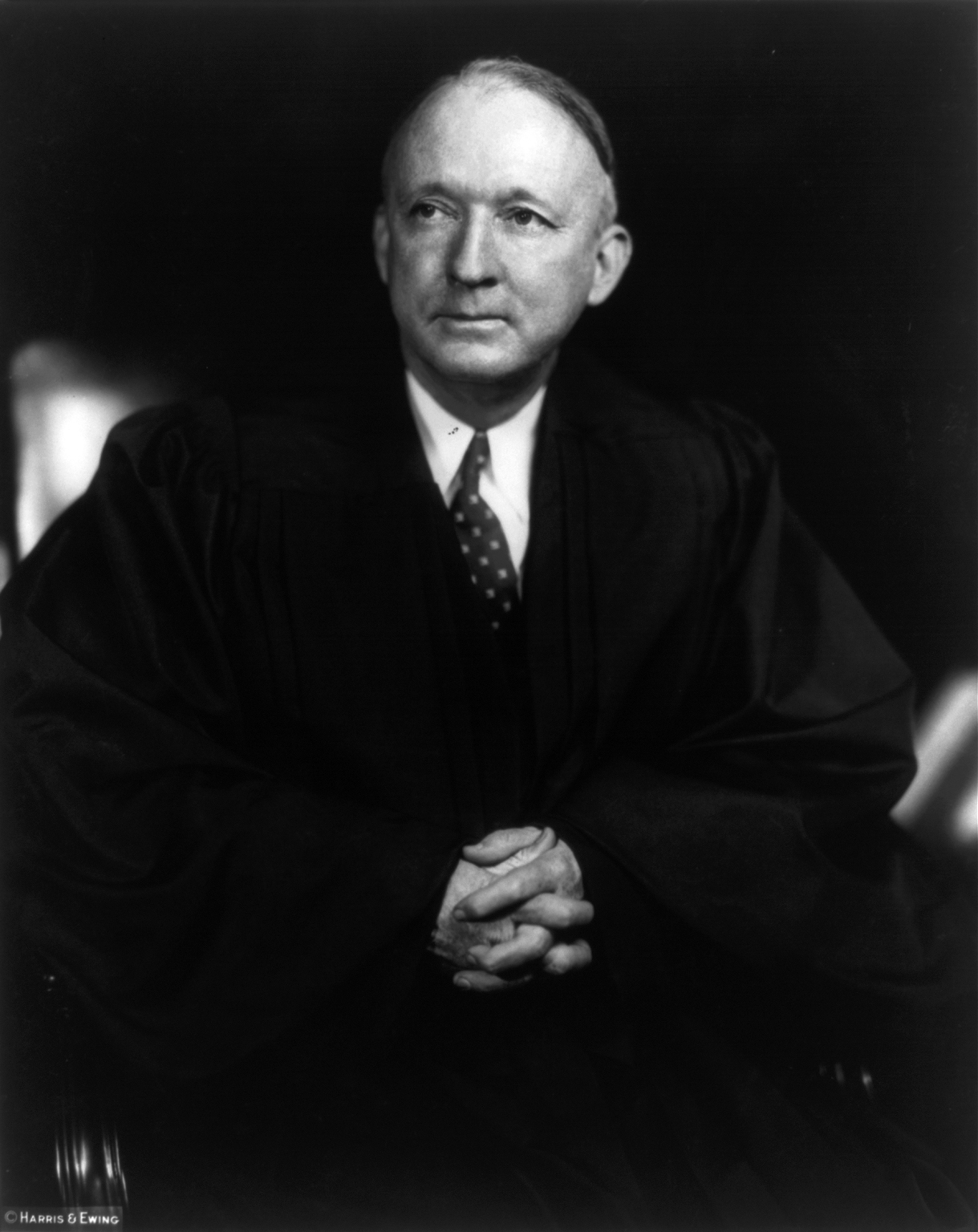
Justice Hugo Black

== Ruling by Supreme Court ==
The Supreme Court, in an opinion by Justice Hugo Black, unanimously affirmed the judgment of the Second Circuit on different grounds. The Court did not consider whether FOGA had property rights that were wrongfully invaded, or whether a boycott could be justified on some ground. It held horizontal boycotts (concerted refusals to deal) illegal per se.

The Court began by declaring, "If the purpose and practice of the combination of garment manufacturers and their affiliates runs counter to the public policy declared in the Sherman and Clayton Acts, the Federal Trade Commission has the power to suppress it as an unfair method of competition." The Court then considered whether the challenged boycott violated the letter of the Sherman or Clayton Acts, and found both to have been violated.

The Court then found that FOGA's "scheme" violated § 3 of the Clayton Act because "the scheme is bottomed upon a system of sale under which (1) textiles shall be sold to garment manufacturers only upon the condition and understanding that the buyers will not use or deal in textiles which are copied from the designs of textile manufacturing Guild members; (2) garment manufacturers shall sell to retailers only upon the condition and understanding that the retailers shall not use or deal in such copied designs." Since the FTC concluded "that these understandings substantially lessened competition and tended to create a monopoly," the FTC "correctly concluded that this practice constituted an unfair method of competition."

FOGA's program also violated the policies of §§ 1 and 2 of the Sherman Act, in that: "it narrows the outlets to which garment and textile manufacturers can sell and the sources from which retailers can buy; subjects all retailers and manufacturers who decline to comply with the Guild's program to an organized boycott; takes away the freedom of action of members by requiring each to reveal to the Guild the intimate details of their individual affairs; and has both as its necessary tendency and as its purpose and effect the direct suppression of competition from the sale of unregistered textiles and copied designs." In addition, FOGA's "combination is in reality an extra-governmental agency which prescribes rules for the regulation and restraint of interstate commerce and provides extrajudicial tribunals for determination and punishment of violations, and thus 'trenches upon the power of the national legislature and violates the statute.' "

FOGA argued that the "boycott and restraint of interstate trade is not within the ban of the policies of the Sherman and Clayton Acts, because 'the practices of FOGA were reasonable and necessary to protect the manufacturer, laborer, retailer and consumer against the devastating evils growing from the pirating of original designs and had in fact benefited all four. " In addition, FOGA said, the copying of dress designs against which FOGA directed its conduct was itself tortious. The Court rejected these arguments, saying:

[E]ven if copying were an acknowledged tort under the law of every state, that situation would not justify petitioners in combining together to regulate and restrain interstate commerce in violation of federal law. And for these same reasons, the principles declared in International News Service v. Associated Press cannot serve to legalize petitioners' unlawful combination.

== Subsequent developments ==
In Associated Press v. United States the Supreme Court condemned the restrictive by-laws of the AP because, like FOGA, AP was operating as a private government:

Here as in the Fashion Originator's Guild case, 'the combination is in reality an extra-governmental agency, which prescribes rules for the regulation and restraint of interstate commerce, and provides extra-judicial tribunals for determination and punishment of violations, and thus 'trenches upon the power of the national legislature and violates the statute.'

In FTC v. Cement Institute, the Supreme Court relied on the FOGA case to support the proposition that restrictive practices that violate the Sherman Act violate § 5 of the FTC Act.

In Klor's, Inc. v. Broadway-Hale Stores, Inc., the Supreme Court relied on the FOGA case to support the proposition: "Group boycotts, or concerted refusals by traders to deal with other traders, have long been held to be in the forbidden category. They have not been saved by allegations that they were reasonable in the specific circumstances, nor by a failure to show that they 'fixed or regulated prices, parcelled out or limited production, or brought about a deterioration in quality.' " In the Klor's case, the boycott was created when a retail store, Broadway-Hale, and ten household appliance manufacturers and their distributors agreed that the distributors would not sell household appliances (or would sell them only at discriminatory prices) to Broadway-Hale's small, nearby competitor, Klor's, a price-cutter. The defendants submitted undisputed evidence that their agreement hurt only one competitor (Klor's) and that so many other nearby appliance-selling competitors remained that competition in the marketplace continued to thrive. The Court held that this evidence was immaterial, because the conspiracy was "not to be tolerated merely because the victim is just one merchant."

In American Society of Mechanical Engineers, Inc. v. Hydrolevel Corp., the Supreme Court condemned the use of as standards-setting agency by some of its members to exclude competition. As in the FOGA case, the Court said: "ASME can be said to be 'in reality an extra-governmental agency, which prescribes rules for the regulation and restraint of interstate commerce.' "

In Nynex Corp. v. Discon, Inc., the Supreme Court held that the per se rule against boycotts was limited to horizontal group boycotts. The Court said:

[T]he specific legal question before us is whether an antitrust court considering an agreement by a buyer to purchase goods or services from one supplier rather than another should (after examining the buyer's reasons or justifications) apply the per se rule if it finds no legitimate business reason for that purchasing decision. We conclude no boycott-related per se rule applies and that the plaintiff here must allege and prove harm, not just to a single competitor, but to the competitive process, i.e., to competition itself.

The Court pointed to precedent: FOGA involved "a group boycott in the strongest sense: A group of competitors threatened to withhold business from third parties unless those third parties would help them injure their directly competing rivals." Klor's "also involved a horizontal agreement among those threatened, namely, the appliance suppliers, to hurt a competitor of the retailer who made the threat." Because the case before the Court "concerns only a vertical agreement and a vertical restraint, a restraint that takes the form of depriving a supplier of a potential customer," it was not within existing boycott precedent.

== Commentary ==
Wallace Kirkpatrick, an official of the Antitrust Division, writing shortly after the Supreme Court's decision in the FOGA case, pointed out the difference between Learned Hand's and Justice Black's respective approaches to boycotts against wrongdoers—persons committing criminal or tortious acts. Judge Hand held that a boycott may be justified by the conduct of the person against whom the boycott is directed, even where the boycott was not a refusal to participate in unlawful acts. For instance, he said, it was justifiable for dress manufacturers to boycott retailers who got access to unpublished designs by a crime or a breach of contract, or who knowingly bought from a manufacturer who stole unpublished designs or copied them without the owner's consent. Justice Black, however, would not permit vigilante justice. He said that the fact that a person was engaged in tortious conduct would not allow a group to refuse in concert to deal with him and would not justify "combining together to regulate and restrain interstate commerce in violation of federal law." Kirkpatrick pointed out that the Supreme Court, but not Judge Hand, properly followed the principle that the Supreme Court had explained in United States v. American Livestock Comm'n Co., which distinguished between joint refusals to participate in unlawful conduct and joint refusals to deal where "the wrong is completely independent of the dealings into which the combination refuses to enter." Kirkpatrick aligns himself with Black in saying that no private group has the right to "assum[e] the power to decide who is fitted to enter into business and what is a prerequisite for engaging in interstate commerce."

Robert Merges observed of FOGA that the only important differences between it (and similar guilds) and a formal statutory IP right covering fashion designs were:

1. the guilds were based on "an informal, inter-industry quasi-property right, rather than a formal statutory right";
2. the guilds "required concerted action to achieve any appropriability"; and
3. the guilds "concentrated [their] enforcement efforts at the retail level by requiring retailers to sign contracts and by policing retailers, rather than targeting competing manufacturers."

In Merges's view, which is the diametric opposite of that of the Court in regard to "an extra-governmental agency which prescribes rules for the regulation and restraint of interstate commerce and provides extrajudicial tribunals for determination and punishment of violations," the FTC and Court made a mistake in condemning FOGA "out of hand" simply because it ran a boycott. Rather, the "Court should have considered whether the Guild tended to enhance economic efficiency,' and whether it did so at a lower cost than a formal property right in dress design." He would favor the Guild over a formal IPR [intellectual property right] granted by the state . . . [if] the combination of (1) enforcement at the retail level and (2) shared understandings about what qualifies as an 'original design' would make the system cheaper to administer than a formal, state-run system that created the same level of reward, and hence incentives." He concludes that the Court's rejection of the FOGA scheme:

not only killed an interesting experiment in alternative intellectual property systems, but it also sent a far-reaching signal that when these systems are based on informal property rights, they are void per se. While this conclusion may be defensible in certain cases, it might have been better to establish a "rule of reason" analysis for private intellectual property systems.

Like Kirkpatrick, Professors Hemphill and Suk noted the difference between Judge Hand's relatively tolerant attitude and reluctance to condemn the Guild, as contrasted with Justice Black's condemnation of its usurpation of legislative power in the final opinion of the Court. But they describe an early unpublished draft of the FOGA opinion, in which Justice Black gave careful substantive attention to the Guild's justification arguments, stating that "there is much force in petitioners' arguments" that a quasi-property right like that recognized in the INS case could perhaps apply, but concluding that the principle was too difficult to confine within limits. A subsequent draft of the opinion adopts a suggestion by Justice Harlan Stone that the case should be disposed of "on the ground that self-help through boycott was impermissible, even to vindicate a legal right."

== See also ==
- C. Scott Hemphill and Jeannie Suk, The Fashion Originators' Guild of America: Self-Help at the Edge of IP and Antitrust (March 22, 2013).
- Friend Friday: Copying in the Fashion Industry (is imitation the sincerest form of flattery?) in Beautifully Invisible Blog (Sept. 3, 2010).
