= Copyright Act of 1909 =

US federal legislation

- Long title: An Act to Amend and Consolidate the Acts Representing Copyright
- Enacted by: the 60th United States Congress
- Effective: July 1, 1909

Citations
- Public law: Pub. L. 60–349
- Statutes at Large: 35 Stat. 1075

Codification
- Acts repealed: Copyright Act of 1870

Legislative history
- Introduced in the House of Representatives as H.R. 28192 by Frank Currier (R–NH) on February 15, 1909; Committee consideration by Committee on Patents; Signed into law by President Theodore Roosevelt on March 4, 1909

Major amendments
- 1912, 1914, 1941, repealed by the Copyright Act of 1976

United States Supreme Court cases
- Herbert v. Shanley Co.; F. W. Woolworth Co. v. Contemporary Arts, Inc.; Mazer v. Stein; Williams & Wilkins Co. v. United States

The Copyright Act of 1909 (Pub. L. 60–349, 35 Stat. 1075, enacted March 4, 1909) was a landmark statute in United States copyright law. It went into effect on July 1, 1909. The 1909 Act was repealed and superseded by the Copyright Act of 1976, which went into effect on January 1, 1978; but some of 1909 Act's provisions continue to apply to copyrighted works created before 1978. Significantly, the Act would also demonstrate the first example of a compulsory license in US copyright law. This mechanical license procedure was created in response to case law on piano rolls, but it would also apply to phonograph records, and would become generalized to cover versions.

== Background ==
Expansion of U.S. copyright law (Assuming authors create their works at age 35 and live for seventy years)

Before the 1909 Act, the last major revision to United States copyright law was the Copyright Act of 1870. Methods of reproducing and duplicating works subject to copyright had significantly increased since the first Copyright Act in 1790. President Theodore Roosevelt expressed the need for a complete revision of copyright law as opposed to amendments, saying in a message to Congress in December 1905, "Our copyright laws urgently need revision. They are imperfect in definition, confused and inconsistent in expression; they omit provision for many articles which, under modern reproductive processes, are entitled to protection; they impose hardships upon the copyright proprietor which are not essential to the fair protection of the public; they are difficult for the courts to interpret and impossible for the Copyright Office to administer with satisfaction to the public."

Under the 1909 Act, federal statutory copyright protection attached to original works only when those works were 1) published and 2) had a notice of copyright affixed. Thus, state copyright law governed protection for unpublished works, but published works, whether containing a notice of copyright or not, were governed exclusively by federal law. If no notice of copyright was affixed to a work and the work was "published" in a legal sense, the 1909 Act provided no copyright protection and the work became part of the public domain. In the report submitted by the House Committee on Patents, they designed the copyright law "not primarily for the benefit of the author, but primarily for the benefit of the public." The 1976 Act changed this result, providing that copyright protection attaches to works that are original and fixed in a tangible medium of expression, regardless of publication or affixation of notice.

Under Section 24, the act extended copyright terms for existing copyrighted works to the maximum of 56 years as well. This meant that all works from 1881 onward still under copyright were granted an extended renewal of 28 more years.

=== Compulsory licensing ===
The 1909 Act also created (codified in Section 1(e)) the first compulsory license to allow anyone to make a mechanical reproduction of a musical composition without the consent of the copyright owner provided that the person adhered to the provisions of the license. This mechanical license procedure was created in response to case law on piano rolls, but it would also apply to phonograph records. In later practice, compulsory license made it possible to record and distribute a cover version of a hit song—once a recording had been released, and the copyright owner was served with a notice of intention to use—that directly competed with the original.

== Case law ==
=== White-Smith Music Publishing Company v. Apollo Company ===
In February 1908, the Supreme Court ruled that manufacturers of pianola music rolls were not required to pay royalties to composers, based on the holding that these music rolls were not copies of musical compositions within the meaning of copyright law because it was not "a written or printed record in intelligible notation." This decision on sheet music was superseded by the Act.

=== Herbert v. Shanley Co. ===
On January 22, 1917, Supreme Court Justice Oliver Holmes upheld the right for copyright owners to compensation for a public performance of a musical composition, even if there was no direct charge for admission. This ruling forced Shanley's Restaurant in New York to pay a fee to songwriter Victor Herbert for playing one of his songs on a player piano during dinner. This decision helped the ASCAP adopt the royalty-payment mechanism known as a "blanket license", which is still used today. Under a blanket license, signatory businesses such as restaurants have the right to play any composition of an ASCAP artist for an annual fee.

=== F. W. Woolworth Co. v. Contemporary Arts, Inc. ===
In 1952, the Supreme Court held that the Act gave trial judges significant freedom in imposing legal remedies to discourage copyright infringement. Under this ruling, judges could penalize copyright infringers with repaying profits or paying compensation for damages. If damages could not be determined, judges could levy statutory damages instead.

== Notable amendments ==
=== The Townsend Amendment of 1912 ===
This amendment resulted in motion pictures being specifically added to the category of protected works. Prior to this amendment, United States copyright law did not protect nor register motion picture films. Instead, most motion picture filmmakers would register their work as a collection of still photographs.

=== The Act of March 28, 1914 ===
This amendment amended section 12 of the Copyright Act of 1909, allowing foreign authors whose work had been published in a foreign country to submit only one copy of the best edition of their work, rather than the customary two. This helped ease the deposit requirements of foreign authors.

=== The Act of September 25, 1941 ===
This amended section 8 of the Copyright Act of 1909 with the intention to preserve the right of authors during periods of emergency, and specifically for World War II. The purpose of this amendment was to prevent authors, copyright owners, or proprietors from losing the opportunity to acquire or preserve copyright protection for their works because of the disruption of communication or suspension of facilities where they could acquire copyright licenses because of the war.

=== Sound Recording Amendment of 1971 ===
The Sound Recording Amendment, also known as the Sound Recording Act, extended federal copyright protection to sound recordings first fixed on or after February 15, 1972. This amendment was passed in response to the growing issue of record and tape piracy in the United States.

== See also ==
- United States Copyright Law
- Copyright Act of 1790
- Copyright Act of 1831
- Copyright Act of 1976
- Berne Convention for the Protection of Literary and Artistic Works
- List of copyright case law

== Bibliography ==
- "Act of March 4, 1909 (in effect July 1, 1909)." Copyright Law of the United States. Copyright.gov, 2012. Web. 8 Jan. 2012. <http://www.copyright.gov/history/1909act.pdf>.
