= Walt Disney Productions v. Air Pirates =

American copyright law case

- Court: United States Court of Appeals for the Ninth Circuit
- Full case name: Walt Disney Productions v. Air Pirates
- Decided: September 5, 1978
- Citation: 581 F.2d 751

Case history
- Procedural history: Affirmed decision for the plaintiffs from 345 F.Supp. 108 (N. Ca. 1972)

Holding
- Air Pirates had infringed on copyrights owned by Disney when using the Mickey Mouse character in a satirical publication.

Court membership
- Judges sitting: Richard Harvey Chambers, Walter J. Cummings, J. Blaine Anderson

Case opinions
- Majority: Cummings

Laws applied
- United States copyright law

Walt Disney Productions v. Air Pirates, 581 F.2d 751 (1978), was a copyright law case of the United States Court of Appeals for the Ninth Circuit, and an important precedent on the use of copyrighted characters for purposes of parody or satire.

== Background ==
The Air Pirates were a group of cartoonists who published two issues of an underground comic called Air Pirates Funnies in 1971. The comic featured a satirical version of Mickey Mouse (never referred to by his full name) who was positioned as a symbol of conformist hypocrisy in American culture. The comic also depicted other well-known Disney characters engaging in adult behaviors such as sex and drug consumption.

Air Pirates founder Dan O'Neill wanted the comic to be noticed by the Disney company and arranged for copies to be smuggled into board meetings. Disney executives became aware of the comic and sued the Air Pirates for copyright infringement, trademark infringement, and unfair competition.

== District court proceedings ==
The case was first heard at the United States District Court for Northern California in 1972. Disney sought an injunction against further publication and sale of the Air Pirates Funnies comic books featuring depictions of its characters, and for existing copies of the comic books to be destroyed. The Air Pirates claimed that the characters could be used for satirical purposes per the fair use doctrine of American copyright law. To raise funds for their defense, the Air Pirates continued to sell copies of the comics plus custom-made artwork satirizing Disney characters at comic book conventions.

The District Court ruled in favor of Disney, O'Neill, the lead artist in the Air Pirates Funnies comics, admitted to drawing the satirical versions of Mickey Mouse and other characters almost exactly like Disney's versions so readers would understand the satire, and to co-opt Disney's claim that the characters represented "an image of innocent delightfulness". The company argued that the characters were beloved by children, and depicting those characters engaged in objectionable adult pursuits could damage the company's reputation.

Despite noting the satirical value of the Air Pirates Funnies depictions of several well-known Disney characters, the court held that the depictions were sufficiently similar to the originals to cause confusion among potential readers about the source of the comics. Per the Copyright Act of 1909, this was found to be copyright infringement. The court held that Disney's further claims of trademark infringement and unfair competition were moot.

Tens of thousands of copies of Air Pirates Funnies, and an associated comic called The Tortoise and the Hare that featured the same characters, were seized under a court order in 1972. O'Neill appealed the District Court ruling, and while the case slowly worked its way through the courts, continued to defiantly draw and sell parodies of Disney characters. In 1975, Disney won a $200,000 judgement and a restraining order against Air Pirates for distributing the parodies, which O'Neill continued to ignore. O'Neill maintained that he hoped to lose in court and continually appeal, and perhaps even go to jail, as a statement on Disney's corporate power over popular culture. He gained some sympathetic supporters within the Disney organization and even delivered some of his drawings directly to the corporate offices as part of his campaign against the company.

== Circuit Court opinion ==
The cover of the second issue of Air Pirates Funnies, featuring depictions of Mickey and Minnie Mouse, 1971

The case finally reached the Ninth Circuit Court of Appeals in 1978. The court unanimously upheld the District Court's ruling on copyright infringement, and remanded the concurrent trademark infringement and unfair competition claims back to the lower court for further discovery (though Disney did not pursue those claims any further). The court rejected the Air Pirates' claim of fair use for satirical purposes, because the depictions of the characters at issue were indistinguishable from Disney's originals.

At the Circuit Court, the Air Pirates added a free speech claim with an argument that copyright infringement lawsuits against satires and parodies would chill public discussion. The court rejected this argument under the rationale that the Air Pirates could have expressed their opinions about the Disney company without confusingly similar depictions of its characters. O'Neill was also ordered to pay more than $2 million in damages and legal fees to Disney, though the company decided that O'Neill would be unable to pay and settled this matter in 1980, as long as O'Neill promised to no longer infringe on the company's copyrights. Air Pirates appealed the decision to the United States Supreme Court, but their writ of certiorari was denied and the Circuit Court ruling on copyright infringement stood.

== Impact ==
While the Air Pirates case worked its way through the courts, it attracted interest from free speech activists and critics of popular culture. Law professor Edward Samuels was skeptical of O'Neill's defiant strategy and later concluded that the saga "set parody back twenty years". The dispute has been acknowledged as an important matter in the history of underground comics, and was detailed in the 1988 documentary film Comic Book Confidential. The case also resulted in the Disney company gaining a possibly unfair reputation for excessive use of copyright law, though the saga raised awareness of the need for a balance between the interests of rights holders and the creative impulses of satirists.

The case is often cited as a formative precedent in copyright law, holding that individual characters can be copyrighted outside of the books or movies in which they appear, while those characters have physical and conceptual qualities that themselves qualify for copyright protection. Meanwhile, simply copying such characters with little alteration for satirical purposes is copyright infringement and does not qualify as fair use. More fundamentally, the case formed a settled precedent on the copyrightability of cartoon characters, while production companies should receive the benefits from their long-term stewardship of such characters.
