= Pereira v. United States =

- Supreme Court of the United States

Argued October 20, 1953 Decided February 1, 1954
- Full case name: Pereira, et al. v. United States
- Citations: 347 U.S. 1 (more) 74 S. Ct. 358; 98 L. Ed. 435; 1954 U.S. LEXIS 2623

Holding
- The word "knowingly" in the federal mail fraud statute (18 U.S.C. § 1341) should extend to all reasonably foreseeable consequences, even ones not specifically intended.

Court membership
- Chief Justice Earl Warren Associate Justices Hugo Black · Stanley F. Reed; Felix Frankfurter · William O. Douglas; Robert H. Jackson · Harold H. Burton; Tom C. Clark · Sherman Minton

Case opinions
- Majority: Warren, joined by Frankfurter, Jackson, Burton, Clark
- Concur/dissent: Minton, joined by Black, Douglas
- Reed took no part in the consideration or decision of the case.

Laws applied
- 18 U.S.C. § 1341

Pereira v. United States, 347 U.S. 1 (1954), was a United States Supreme Court case in which the Court held that the word "knowingly" in the federal mail fraud statute, 18 U.S.C. § 1341, should extend to all reasonably foreseeable consequences, even ones not specifically intended.
