= Perfect 10, Inc. v. Visa International Service Ass'n =

2007 decision of the United States Court of Appeals for the Ninth Circuit

Perfect 10, Inc. v. Visa International Service Ass'n, 494 F.3d 788, is a 2006 decision of the United States Court of Appeals for the Ninth Circuit which held that Visa Inc., Mastercard, First Data Corporation and its subsidiary CardService International, and Humboldt Bank could not be held secondarily liable for copyright and trademark infringement by websites that had stolen content from the pornographic magazine Perfect 10.

== See also ==
- List of leading legal cases in copyright law
- Secondary liability
- A&M Records, Inc. v. Napster, Inc.
- MGM v. Grokster
- Perfect 10, Inc. v. CCBill, LLC
- Perfect 10 v. Google

== Sources ==
- Yang, Kelly K. (2011). "Paying for Infringement: Implicating Credit Card Networks in Secondary Trademark Liability" (PDF). Trademark Law. Notes. Berkeley Technology Law Journal. Annual Review. 26 (1): 687–725. Archived (PDF) from the original on July 3, 2024.
