= F. W. Woolworth Co. v. Contemporary Arts, Inc. =

F. W. Woolworth Co. v. Contemporary Arts, Inc
- Supreme Court of the United States

Argued November 17, 1952 Decided December 22, 1952
- Full case name: F. W. Woolworth Co. v. Contemporary Arts, Inc
- Citations: 344 U.S. 228 (more) 73 S. Ct. 222; 97 L. Ed. 276; 95 U.S.P.Q. 396

Case history
- Prior: 93 F. Supp. 739 (D. Mass. 1950); affirmed, 193 F.2d 162 (1st Cir. 1951); cert. granted, 343 U.S. 963 (1952).

Holding
- Trial judges enjoy wide latitude with imposing possible remedies to discourage copyright violations. They may penalize infringers with repaying profits, compensation for damages or statutory damages as appropriate to the situation.

Court membership
- Chief Justice Fred M. Vinson Associate Justices Hugo Black · Stanley F. Reed; Felix Frankfurter · William O. Douglas; Robert H. Jackson · Harold H. Burton; Tom C. Clark · Sherman Minton

Case opinions
- Majority: Jackson, joined by Vinson, Reed, Douglas, Burton, Clark, Minton
- Dissent: Black, joined by Frankfurter

Laws applied
- Copyright Act of 1909

F. W. Woolworth Co. v. Contemporary Arts, Inc. nicknamed The Cocker Spaniel Case, 344 U.S. 228 (1952), is a United States Supreme Court case regarding copyright infringement. The Copyright Act of 1909 allows recovery of either the profits of the infringing company or of the damages suffered by the copyright holder as the legal remedies. When the actual damages cannot be determined, statutory damages can be levied instead. At issue, is whether the trial judge can impose statutory damages when the actual profits of the infringer are known.

== Copyright infringement ==
In 1942, independent artist Elizabeth Anne Philbrick received a copyright for a statuette of a “Cocker-Spaniel in Sitting Position.” In 1943, Contemporary Arts bought all rights to the artwork.

Contemporary Arts sold the Cocker Spaniel statuettes in gift shops and art stores in three different grades:

- Red Plaster version: MSRP $4
- Red Porcelain version: $9
- White Porcelain version: $15

In 1949, Woolworth bought nearly identically designed statuettes from the Sabin Manufacturing company of McKeesport, Pennsylvania, through the Lepere Pottery Company of Zanesville, Ohio. No evidence was provided that Woolworth's knowingly participated in the copyright infringement.

Woolworth sold the items for only $1.19. Contemporary Arts provided evidence that the version sold at Woolworth was inferior in quality. Although Woolworth's attorneys disputed the existence of a copyright violation in the original trial, the appellate court assumed the infringement and focused on the calculation and method for the legal remedy.

== Profits of the Affringer ==
Woolworth bought 127 dozen dogs at $0.60 each and sold them for $1.19 each for a total gross profits of $899.16. Woolworth argued that its liability was limited to its own profits.

Although the profits appear substantial by this calculation, Woolworth failed to include allowable deducted for overhead and taxes. The majority decision found that low-margin sales provided poor remedy to discourage copyright violations. “If we sustain petitioner's contention that profits may be the sole measure of liability as matter of law, such profits could be diminished even to the vanishing point” the majority decision read. Indeed, if the copyright violating endeavor lost money, no recourse would be available in the courts.

== Damages ==
Contemporary Arts presented evidence Woolworth's imitation forced their product out of the marketplace. The exact dollar total of the damages could not be ascertained however.

The statute allows for statutory damages of between $250 and $5,000 if the violation is not willful. The trial judge had imposed the maximum $5,000 plus $2,000 in attorneys fees. The majority upheld that ruling because the statute vested broad discretion to the courts based on the evidence and specifics of each case. Even though the judge made comments that could be perceived as prejudicial, the ruling was sound.

The majority ruled that falling back on statutory damages was appropriate even though the profit of the offender could be calculated. In this case, the profits made by Woolworth's were irrelevant when compared to the damage done to Contemporary Arts business model. “Indeed sales at a small margin might cause more damage to the copyright proprietor than sales of the infringing article at a higher price” read Jackson's decision.

Because Sabin provided indemnification as part of the sale, they actually paid all damages. They openly assisted the defense as a de facto party in the suit.

== Dissent ==
Hugo Black's dissent argued that the court should only resort to statutory fines in lieu of actual damages when they cannot be calculated. While the dissent felt “that the defendant really had a fair and impartial trial” the prejudicial remarks by the trial judge nonetheless warranted a remand for a new trial.

== See also ==
- List of United States Supreme Court cases, volume 344
- List of copyright case law
