= United States ex rel. Accardi v. Shaughnessy =

- Supreme Court of the United States

Argued February 2, 1954 Decided March 15, 1954
- Full case name: United States ex rel. Accardi v. Shaughnessy
- Citations: 347 U.S. 260 (more) 74 S. Ct. 499; 98 L. Ed. 2d 681

Holding
- Administrative agencies are obliged to follow their own regulations.

Court membership
- Chief Justice Earl Warren Associate Justices Hugo Black · Stanley F. Reed; Felix Frankfurter · William O. Douglas; Robert H. Jackson · Harold H. Burton; Tom C. Clark · Sherman Minton

Case opinions
- Majority: Clark, joined by Warren, Black, Frankfurter, Douglas
- Dissent: Jackson, joined by Reed, Burton, Minton

United States ex rel. Accardi v. Shaughnessy, 347 U.S. 260 (1954), is a landmark United States Supreme Court administrative law case. The Court held that administrative agencies in the Federal Government are obliged to follow their own regulations, policies and procedures. Under the Accardi doctrine, named after this case, federal agencies which do not follow their own regulations or procedures run the risk of having their actions invalidated if challenged in court.

The Accardi doctrine was later strengthened in Service v. Dulles, 354 U.S. 363 (1957) and Vitarelli v. Seaton, 359 U.S. 535 (1959).

Due to a ruling in United States v. Fausto, the doctrine generally does not apply to Federal employment decisions that are covered by the Civil Service Reform Act of 1978.
