= Alfred Bell & Co. v. Catalda Fine Arts =

American legal case on copyright

- Court: United States Court of Appeals for the Second Circuit
- Citation: 191 F.2d 99

Case history
- Prior history: Motions to dismiss and to strike denied. 74 F.Supp. 973 (S.D.N.Y. 1947). Judgment for plaintiffs. 86 F.Supp. 399 (S.D.N.Y. 1949).

Court membership
- Judges sitting: Harrie B. Chase, Charles Edward Clark, Jerome Frank

Case opinions
- Majority: Frank, joined by Chase, Clark

Alfred Bell & Co. v. Catalda Fine Arts, Inc., 191 F.2d 99 (2d Cir. 1951) was a decision in the United States Court of Appeals for the Second Circuit in dealing with copyright law. On appeal, this case clarified the standard for evaluating originality in copyrightable works, specifically derivative works. The court examines an engraver's reproduction of paintings found in the public domain. The engraver's interpretation and "creative spin" on the paintings are at issue in deciding whether the changes made were enough to constitute "originality" and worth granting copyright protection to the engravers. The court finds that the standard to satisfy the Constitution and statutes regarding copyrights is that the author contributed "something more than a 'merely trivial' variation, something recognizably 'his own." Therefore, the court affirms there was a legally protected copyright at issue. Subsequently, the court grapples with the way the defendants infringed on the copyrights and whether the lower court was correct in allowing income-tax deductions for the sales they made in selling infringing material. It decides the defendants were not entitled to the deductions.

== Overview ==
This decision comes from the lower court in the Southern District of New York, delivered unanimously by District Judge Smith. There, the court made a ruling based on the whether the plaintiffs, Alfred Bell & Co. (Alfred Bell), had a valid copyright for their mezzotint engravings, and whether the defendants had infringed upon them. In this 1947 decision, the court ruled that Alfred Bell did in fact own the copyrights for their works and Catalda Fine Arts had infringed on those exclusive rights when they reproduced and sold lithographs of those works without plaintiff's authorization.

In the interim of the two cases, there was an interlocutory judgment and order of reference to a master (essentially an expert's consult) in which the same District Court and Judge found infringement. Both parties filed cross-motions for review of the master's report and objections, and the District Court ordered that the interlocutory judgment, as amended, should be entered as a final judgment. The judgment was centered on fees, relief, and costs owed.

== Facts ==
Alfred Bell was a print producer and dealer who had created eight different mezzotint engravings of "old masters". The defendants were color lithographers and dealers of lithographs who were selling color lithographs (color prints) of these same eight mezzotints. The old masters that the mezzotints were based on were all a part of the public domain, therefore, the paintings themselves could not be copyrighted. However, the process of reproducing the paintings in this new medium was very tedious and a great expense of time and money.

The basic features of each painting are those of the original artist, but the engraving process involves drawing across a copper plate with a pressure hand tool that has many fine teeth. The tool is drawn across the plate several times until the plate is completely covered with a roughened texture. The engraver then outlines the image onto the roughened plate and subsequently covers the image in carbon black (or a similar substance) and continues scraping the image to emphasize details and shading. To complete the print, the engraver will cover the plate in an ink color to cover all of the depressions made in the plate, and press the plate into a sheet or canvas to impress the image on the print. There are several decisions to be made and creative nuances to make in this type of reproduction. The lower court in the 1947 case determined this process sufficiently satisfied the element of originality needed to claim copyright of a work that was a recreation of something in the public domain.

Alfred Bell then went on to print reproductions of the mezzotint engravings in its catalogue, but did not provide any notice of copyright in the print. The catalogue was circulated for advertising purposes. The court denied defendants' arguments that the lack of notice of copyright in the catalogue resulted in an abandonment of the right. If an artist abandons their work, it becomes part of the public domain and can no longer be protected by copyright. However, the purposes of publication was for advertising the engravings for purchase and not intended to abandon the copyright.

Defendants Catalda Fine Arts subsequently produced and sold color lithographs of these eight mezzotints. It was conceded that the defendants specifically used the proofs taken from Alfred Bell's engraving plates. The court noted that had the defendants used an item in the public domain (like the original old masters), then this method of reproduction might permit copyright, but because they used a copyrighted subject, it was infringement.

== Arguments on Appeal ==
In looking to the Constitution, which authorizes the issuance of both patents and copyrights, the defendants argued that copyrights should be held to the same standard as patents; they should require a high standard of uniqueness and novelty.

Defendants also argued that plaintiff's mezzotints should never have been considered valid copyrights because they simply copied works (the original paintings) that were in the public domain, and tried to claim copyright for such works.

Next, the court reviewed the lower court's conclusion that the defendants acted in good-faith when they continued their sales because they were under the impression that plaintiffs had an invalid copyright. This is known as the unclean-hands defense which asks a court of equity not to grant a party the relief sought, if they have engaged in inequitable behavior related to their claim. The court did not find that the defendants made their "unclean-hands" defense out sufficiently, and consequently decided they do not deserve the additional penalty of disallowance of the income-tax deduction here.

Lastly, the court reviewed whether the defendants should be entitled to the income-tax deduction. In looking at the computation of profits, the lower court concluded that the income taxes the defendants paid upon the profits for the years in which they were earned were allowed to be deducted from their gross profits "in determining the amount of profits payable by the defendants to the plaintiff."

== Court's analysis ==
In response to the defendant's first argument, the court denied that copyrights should be analyzed as critically as patents, because the Copyright Act "dispense[s] with any such high standard," and the Constitution explicitly makes the distinction between 'authors' and their 'writings' from 'inventors' and their 'discoveries,' thus assuring that those writing the Constitution knowingly decided and intended the difference. Additionally, in the year after adopting the Constitution, Congress enacted two statutes specifically parsing out the separate requirements for patents and copyrights, respectively. The patent statute provides all the parameters necessary for claiming a successful patent: it must be deemed sufficiently useful and important by any two of the Secretary of State, Secretary of War, or Attorney General; the applicant must specify with particularity the distinguishing qualities of the invention or discovery from other thing that are commonly known or used; the patentee must be the first and true inventor or discoverer. The Copyright Act was enacted May 31, 1790, covering "maps charts and books." It required that a printed copy of the title of any work be recorded in the Clerk's office of the District Court, and a copy delivered to the Secretary of State within 6 months. Congress subsequently added to this statute that these works can also include engravings, etchings, and prints. Importantly, the patent statute requires that an official makes a certified determination as to the character of the invention and its uniqueness, novelty, etc. There is no such requirement for copyrights.

As for the argument that the plaintiffs could not copyright art that copied works in the public domain, the court explained that the Copyright Act explicitly permits reproductions of works or art. Though it restricts the ability to copyright "the original text of any work" in the public domain, it carves out the ability for copyrighting "translations or other versions of works in the public domain." The court further explained that the plaintiff's engravings constituted a derivative in the reproduction of the original. The engravings of the paintings were not meant to imitate but more so to create a whole new version. The court went as far as noting that even if the departure from the original was inadvertent, through poor eyesight or even error, the unintentional variation may still be adopted as the creator's own.

Regarding the lower court's ruling that defendants adequately made out their unclean-hands defense and therefore only infringed under the good-faith belief there was no valid copyright, the court does not agree. The court does not believe that the defendants successfully plead that they had a "good faith claim of defense." The defendants claimed that they genuinely believed the plaintiffs were not entitled to copyright because they were violating American anti-trust laws in the way they were making their sales. However, majority of the business was done in Great Britain and Ireland, and the alleged illegal conduct, which would only violate the American laws, was merely incidental and tangentially related to the sales made in the United States. The court saw this as a very minimal and seemingly unintentional oversight by the plaintiffs. Therefore, the court viewed there was a conflict of policy and deemed there a need to balance the interests of upholding both policies, and weighing which holds higher importance. By balancing the "comparative innocence or guilt of the parties, the moral character of their respective acts, the extent of the harm to the public interest, and the penalty inflicted on the plaintiff by denying relief," the court decided that preventing piracy of copyrighted material was more important than upholding and enforcing anti-trust laws.

It follows that the court disagreed with the lower court's decision in allowing the income-tax deduction. The lower court reasoned that even though "defendants were not innocent of knowledge of the claimed copyright by the plaintiff of the subjects in suit...their villainy is not of the deepest dye in that the copying was open, and with no attempt at concealment, under a good-faith claim of a right to copy because of the claimed invalidity of the plaintiff's copyright." The court here found that the "open and unabashed piracy" was not a showing of good faith and could not conclude that the "claimed invalidity" was justified by the defendants, therefore they were not entitled to the income-tax deduction.

== Impact on law ==
The outcome in Alfred Bell & Co. has solidified its place in the copyright world as providing a new, more clear and defined standard for artists to look to. The case is relied on for looking at what constitutes "derivative works" and originality in copyright. Prior to the case, the legal landscape of derivative works was murkier and the threshold for determining originality in a work was extremely low.

The court in Bleistein v. Donaldson Lithographing Co. (1903), in discussing copies, said that "personality always contains something unique. It expresses its singularity even in handwriting, and a very modest grade of art has in it something irreducible, which is one man's alone. That something he may copyright unless there is a restriction in the words of the act." This was the standard for judging originality prior to this 1951 decision. Alfred Bell & Co. clarified and made clearer the standard of originality in derivative works noting "all that is needed to satisfy both the Constitution and the statute is that the 'author' contributed something more than a 'merely trivial' variation, something recognizably his own." It did not raise the threshold, but provided some further clarity.

=== Subsequent case law ===
In a case involving a medical researcher (Freeman) and assistant (Weissman), the Second Circuit court had to determine whether an educational syllabus made by the Weissman, which contained previous papers that were jointly written by both her and Freeman was original enough to be considered a derivative work and thus Freeman's use of the syllabus infringement. The court decided that even though the syllabus contained papers that were jointly created, the four additional sources Weissman included, plus the choice of arrangement within the syllabus, was original enough to be a derivative work. As support, the court quoted: "In the law of copyright only an unmistakable dash of originality need be demonstrated, high standards of uniqueness in creativity are dispensed with. In deciding whether the originality of the matter added in [the syllabus] is sufficient to qualify for protection as a derivative work, the standard enunciated in Alfred Bell & Co. v. Catalda Fine Arts, Inc., 191 F.2d 99 (2d Cir. 1951) (Frank, J.), remains the law in this Circuit."

The issue in this case was whether a plastic replica of a cast-iron mechanical "Uncle Sam" bank was original enough to qualify as a derivative work. The original work was in the public domain and so the court analyzed the two works, stating that "the test of originality is concededly one with a low threshold in that 'all that is needed ... is that the "author" contributed something more than a "merely trivial" variation, something recognizably "his own."' Alfred Bell & Co. v. Catalda Fine Arts, Inc., 191 F.2d at 103." However, the court also relied on Alfred Bell in denying the plastic replica protection. The court relied on the analysis in Alfred Bell, (specifically the focus on the labor-intensive work of mezzotint engravers) to support that merely replicating an item with plastic, is not enough of a creative spin or derivative.

=== Law journals ===
Scholars have expanded on the Alfred Bell & Co. holding and rule by taking the need for variation as a derivative work and developing steps to complete the analysis in determining whether something achieves the "beyond something merely trivial" standard. Likewise, other scholars are grappling with how to reconcile the low threshold with the evolution of technology and rapid advancement of things like artificial intelligence.

- In analyzing originality as a whole within derivative works, this scholar uses Alfred Bell to emphasize the point that originality has become a spectrum in courts with a fluid approach varying in degree. However, it notes Alfred Bell & Co. brought a more structured approach to assessing originality from the previously very low, nearly-nothing threshold. "Hence, in Alfred Bell, decision makers must investigate at least two matters. First, identify the variations that the derivative-work author has made. Second, determine whether those variations are trivial or distinguishable. If they are distinguishable, then the work satisfies the originality test."
- In looking at digital remastering as derivative works, the author discusses the confusion in courts among what standard to apply. Some courts require "substantial variation" while others, like Alfred Bell simply require something more than merely trivial; something distinguishable. "When analogized to the Alfred Bell case, where small and specific variations in a particular flower, rendition of a hairdo and facial expressions varied distinguishably from the original painting in the eyes of the court, digital remasters may vary enough from the original to pass the distinguishable variation test. On the other hand, when compared to the Durham case, where plastic wind up toy versions of popular Disney characters were held not to satisfy the distinguishable variation test, digital remasters will likely not pass muster."
