= Macmillan Co. v. King =

Copyright infringement case

- Court: United States District Court for the District of Massachusetts
- Full case name: Macmillan Co. v. King
- Decided: June 24, 1914
- Citation: 223 F. 862

Court membership
- Judge sitting: Frederic Dodge

Keywords
- fair use

Macmillan Co. v. King, 223 F. 862 (D. Mass 1914) was a copyright infringement case brought by a publisher of a two-volume economics textbook written by a Harvard University professor in the United States District Court for the District of Massachusetts. Note that this case was decided under previous statutory law and the law of fair use has evolved considerably since this case was decided.

== The facts ==
The defendant was a private tutor that tutored students for preparation for their exams at Harvard. The defendant prepared one-page-long notes that were given at each conference the tutor had with his pupils to be used by his pupils in their studying for the examination. The type-written notes often followed the outline of the books; each student was required to purchase a copy of the book for the course they were taking. The notes were not for distribution to anyone else and the tutor stated that he demanded that the students return the typewritten looseleaf notes after they had completed their examinations in the course. The defendant's claim was that these notes were fair use.

== The holding ==
The court analyzed the content of the notes and found that while they were not copies of the book, they had condensed the book in a manner that made it clear that the notes were nothing more than abridged versions of portions of the book. The summary of a chapter might be one paragraph long; within that paragraph it was structured in the same manner as the book. There were quotations from the book, though usually not more than one sentence long. The language used in the notes were similar to the language used in the textbooks. Sometimes there would be words without quotations taken from the textbooks, but this was never more than a few words long.

As District Judge Dodge stated865-66):

The words so quoted are taken direct from the book. Instances of such quotation are frequent throughout the sheets. They are generally short, consisting of one or two words only; the words selected being usually such as would be likely to catch the attention and remain in the memory. Instances of entire sentences quoted are not so common, though there are several of them. The language of the book is sometimes followed, without being distinguished by quotation marks, though not for more than a few words at a time, so far as I have noticed.

...there is frequent quotation of words, and occasional quotation of sentences from the book; the topics treated are topics treated in the book, the attempt is made to reproduce in abridged and paraphrased form (so far as such reproduction is possible within the very narrow limits adopted) the author's treatment of the topics selected, and the author's order and arrangement of topics within the portions of the book dealt with is followed, except for a certain amount of transposition or repetition.

It is true that the whole book has not been thus dealt with; but the copyright protects every substantial component part of the book, as well as the whole. Though the reproduction of the author's ideas and language is incomplete and fragmentary, and frequently presents them in somewhat distorted form, important portions of them are left substantially recognizable.

This case shows that the analysis of copyright infringement is not a simple procedure based upon direct copying of material; it is also possible through paraphrasing and partial copying to be infringing on a copyright author’s work.
