= Star Athletica, LLC v. Varsity Brands, Inc. =

- Supreme Court of the United States

Argued October 31, 2016 Decided March 22, 2017
- Full case name: Star Athletica, LLC v. Varsity Brands, Inc., et al.
- Docket no.: 15-866
- Citations: 580 U.S. 405 (more) 137 S. Ct. 1002; 197 L. Ed. 2d 354; 2017 U.S. LEXIS 2026
- Argument: Oral argument
- Opinion announcement: Opinion announcement

Case history
- Prior: Judgement for Star Athletica, No. 2:10-cv-02508, 2014 WL 819422 (W.D. Tenn. Mar. 1, 2014); Reversed, 799 F.3d 468 (6th Cir. 2015); Writ of certiorari granted, 136 S.Ct. 1823 (2016)
- Subsequent: Case settled over Star Athletica's objection (2017)

Holding
- Aesthetic design elements on useful articles, like clothing, can be copyrightable if they can be separately identified as art and exist independently of the useful article.

Court membership
- Chief Justice John Roberts Associate Justices Anthony Kennedy · Clarence Thomas; Ruth Bader Ginsburg · Stephen Breyer; Samuel Alito · Sonia Sotomayor; Elena Kagan

Case opinions
- Majority: Thomas, joined by Roberts, Alito, Sotomayor, Kagan
- Concurrence: Ginsburg
- Dissent: Breyer, joined by Kennedy

Laws applied
- Copyright Act of 1976 (17 U.S.C. § 101)

Star Athletica, LLC v. Varsity Brands, Inc., 580 U.S. 405 (2017), was a U.S. Supreme Court case in which the court decided under what circumstances aesthetic elements of "useful articles" can be restricted by copyright law. The Court created a two-prong "separability" test, granting copyrightability based on separate identification and independent existence; the aesthetic elements must be identifiable as art if mentally separated from the article's practical use, and must qualify as copyrightable pictorial, graphic, or sculptural works if expressed in any medium.

The case was a dispute between two clothing manufacturers, Star Athletica and Varsity Brands. Star Athletica began creating cheerleading uniforms with stripes, zigzags, and chevron insignia similar to those made by a Varsity subsidiary, but at a lower price. Varsity sued Star Athletica for copyright infringement, and Star Athletica said that the clothing designs were uncopyrightable because their aesthetic designs were tied closely to (and guided by) their utilitarian purpose as uniforms. The court rejected this argument with a close reading of the statute and established that the clothing designs, as aesthetic elements of a useful article of clothing, could be copyrightable. It declined to hear Star Athletica's follow-up question about whether Varsity's designs were original enough to be copyrightable, so that part of the case remained unaddressed and Varsity's copyright registrations stood.

The court's conclusion that aesthetic elements of useful articles (and, thereby, clothing-design elements) could be copyrighted intrigued fashion designers and intellectual property scholars. Some were pleased with the decision because they saw extending copyright to clothes as parity with other creative industries which had had copyrights for much longer. Others denounced the court's opinion because of ambiguities in how to enforce the new rules and because of its potential to end fashion trends in generic clothing.

== Background ==
=== Fashion was uncopyrightable ===
Clothing designs were originally not subject to copyright law ("uncopyrightable") in the United States. In 1941, the court heard Fashion Originators' Guild of America v. FTC. This case considered the fashion industry's practice of boycotting the sale of its "high fashion" works at places which would sell knock-offs made by other companies for lower prices, known as "style piracy". The court ruled against the Guild, saying that its practice of attempting to create a monopoly outside the copyright system suppressed competition and violated the Sherman Antitrust Act. Outside fashion, Mazer v. Stein established in 1954 that an artistic statue created to adorn a lamp base could be copyrightable separately from the lamp under expansions of the Copyright Act of 1909; the statue's mass production with the lamp did not invalidate that.

Another barrier to copyrightability in the United States is a vague threshold of originality which must be met to be eligible for an intellectual-property monopoly like a copyright or patent. In 1964's Sears, Roebuck & Co. v. Stiffel Co., the court upheld a lower-court ruling that Stiffel's popular lamp design was not original enough to warrant a patent, rescinding that restriction and passing the design into the public domain. The court's opinion indicated that the same logic would apply to an inappropriate copyright.

In the Copyright Act of 1976, Congress changed the copyright law to allow copyrighting aesthetic features of "useful articles" or "an article having an intrinsic utilitarian function that is not merely to portray the appearance of the article or to convey information." Congress intended to better incorporate the Mazer v. Stein ruling by doing so, clarifying the difference between the copyrightability of "applied art" and the traditional, lesser restriction of "industrial design" (the combination of features provided by design patents or trade dress). According to the Act, "pictorial, graphic, or sculptural features" of useful articles were copyrightable only if "separable" from the utilitarian aspects of the design and capable of existing independently of the article. This broad, definitional language led to about ten competing, inconsistent legal tests for that separability, a state of affairs which was criticized for appearing to require judges to be art critics.

Because clothes have both aesthetic and utilitarian features in their design, they fall into this useful-article category; therefore, the shapes and cuts of clothing are not copyrightable. Designs placed on clothing were opened up to the possibility of copyrightability, subject to those tests. The law was construed to mean that copyrighted two-dimensional designs could be placed on clothing and fabric-pattern sheets could be copyrighted before being cut to make clothing, but an article of clothing's overall color scheme and design could not be copyrighted because it was not capable of existing independently of the final useful article. Some fashion designers bristled under the rules, wondering why other creative industries like films or music were allowed to restrict access to their products with copyright and they were not. Others interpreted fashion's successes as an industry thriving in the absence of copyright, perhaps in part because of that. Members of Congress introduced several bills to remove the separability requirement from the law, but none were signed into law.

As alternatives, fashion designers turned to other forms of intellectual property: design patents and trade dress, an aspect of trademark. These generally provided designers causes of action to sue suspected infringers. However, they were critical of the hurdles necessary to acquire these. The process to acquire a design patent could last longer than the trend on which the designer wanted to capitalize. Trade dress required the public to recognize a secondary meaning associating the design with its origin, and was subject to contradictory rulings from the Supreme Court. It was also vulnerable to dilution if courts determined that it was not being policed sufficiently. Defenders of the slow design-patent process said that the design patent's hurdle benefited society as a whole because the extra time prevented ill-advised patents which would disrupt innovation. Extending trademark to fashion had its critics, who argued that the court was out of line when it applied the trade-dress doctrine to fashion after Congress declined to extend trade dress to it in the past. Apart from intellectual property, there were also remedies under laws banning the sale of counterfeits and post-sale protection confusion.

=== Varsity Brands ===
Varsity Brands was the parent company of Varsity Spirit, which had become the largest cheerleading and sports-uniform manufacturer in the world by the end of the 2000s. Because of the law, Varsity could not register copyrights for its cheerleading-uniform designs as clothing. Instead, Varsity applied for copyrights on drawings and photographs of those designs as "two-dimensional artwork" or "fabric design (artwork)." The design in the images would then be applied to the clothing with sewing or sublimation, a process where designs are printed on paper, placed on the fabric, and heated so the ink sinks in. After rejections by the Copyright Office, Varsity described the uniforms in extremely specific detail to make the registration appear limited and improve its registration chances. The Copyright Office approved over 200 of these copyrights with meticulous descriptions like "has a central field of black bordered at the bottom by a gray/white/black multistripe forming a shallow 'vee' of which the left-hand leg is horizontal, while the right-hand leg stretches 'northeast' at approximately a forty-five degree angle." Varsity frequently filed lawsuits alleging infringement with accusations of general copying to halt other companies from merchandising competing uniforms. The competitors regarded the lawsuits as frivolous because the claimed designs were so simple.

=== Star Athletica lawsuit ===
The five cheerleading-uniform designs involved in the case

The Liebe Company founded Star Athletica as a subsidiary in January 2010. Varsity Brands had cancelled an agreement with The Liebe Company's sports-lettering subsidiary, and Varsity accused The Liebe company of founding Star Athletica to retaliate by leveraging former Varsity employees' knowledge of Varsity designs. Later that year, Varsity Brands sued Star Athletica for infringing five of its copyrighted designs for cheerleading uniforms. The Star Athletica designs were not exactly identical (physically or graphically), but Varsity's general description of allegedly-copied elements in court filings ("the lines, stripes, coloring, angles, V's [or chevrons], and shapes and the arrangement and placement of those elements") suited both designs and the case moved forward. Varsity also sued for trademark infringement under the Lanham Act and Star Athletica counter-sued Varsity under the Sherman Antitrust Act for allegedly monopolizing the cheerleading industry, but those claims were dismissed.

In 2014, the United States District Court for the Western District of Tennessee ruled in Star Athletica's favor on the grounds that the designs were not eligible for copyright restriction. According to Judge Robert Hardy Cleland, a design without distinctive marks (like chevrons and zigzags) would not be identifiable as cheerleading uniforms, so the designs were not separately identifiable. They were not conceptually separable because the marks, outside the context of the clothing, would have still evoked the idea of a cheerleading uniform.

The district court's decision was reversed on appeal by the United States Court of Appeals for the Sixth Circuit, Judge Karen Nelson Moore's majority opinion said that the district court should have deferred to the fact that the Copyright Office's trained personnel had granted the copyright registrations. On the questions of the case, Moore evaluated the competing separability tests and created a new five-step test for the Circuit Court analysis. The court found that the designs were copyrightable because the clothes were usable as athletic wear and removing the designs did not affect their utility. Moore said that the design could be separately identifiable because it could be held "side by side" with a blank dress and there would be no utilitarian difference; it could exist independently, because individual aspects (such as chevrons) could appear in designs of other clothing items. She also said that a ruling in favor of Star Athletica would have rendered all paintings uncopyrightable because they decorated the rooms in which they hung. Judge David McKeague dissented, disagreeing about the application of one of the test's steps. The third step asked the court to determine the useful article's "utilitarian aspects." Instead of the majority's more-general assessment of athletic wear, McKeague would have defined the uniforms as clothing the body "in an attractive way for a special occasion" and "identify[ing] the wearer as a cheerleader;" their aesthetic features, therefore, could not be separated from the utilitarian.

Star Athletica filed to be heard by the United States Supreme Court in January 2016. On May 2 of that year, the court granted certiorari "to resolve widespread disagreement over the proper test for implementing § 101's separate-identification and independent-existence requirements." Star Athletica also wanted the court to decide if Varsity's designs were sufficiently original to be copyrighted, but the court declined.

=== Amicus curiae briefs ===
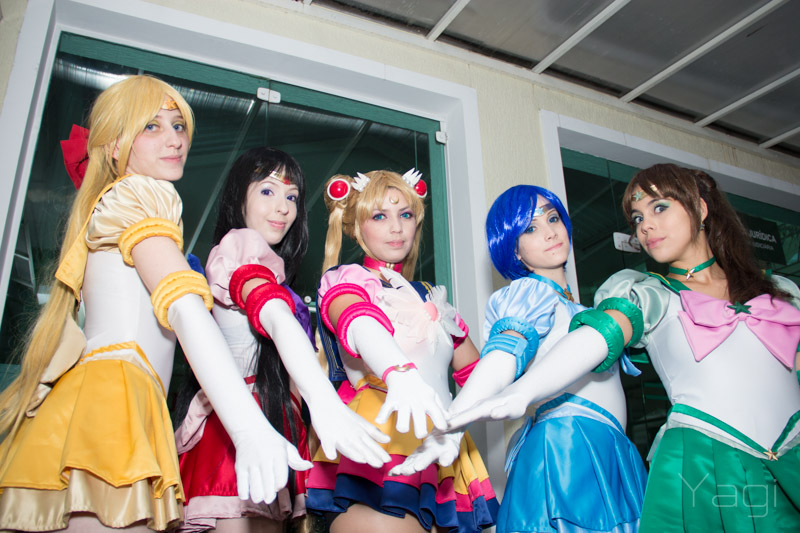
These cosplayers are wearing outfits copied from the Sailor Moon series.

The case attracted the attention of interest groups which filed fifteen amicus curiae briefs. Among Star Athletica's advocates was Public Knowledge, which helped draft a brief representing the views of costuming groups (particularly cosplayers of the Royal Manticoran Navy and the International Costuming Guild) which were concerned that a ruling in Varsity's favor could endanger their craft. Much of cosplaying involved recreating designs recognizable from pop culture. When the legality of creating costumes based on pop culture had been questioned, the Copyright Office decided that costumes were uncopyrightable, useful articles for the practical purpose of covering the body; there was debate over this rationale. Cosplayers also cited fair use to justify their hobby. The Royal Manticoran Navy filed a separate supporting brief in Star Athletica which emphasized fair use in costuming, voicing a concern that allowing clothing-design copyrights would further strengthen Varsity Brands's position in the cheerleading industry, one commonly described as monopolistic because of its 80-percent market share.

Public Knowledge was involved in a brief from Shapeways, the Open Source Hardware Association, Formlabs and the Organization for Transformative Works, who were concerned that copyright restriction would impact 3D printing by making it difficult to share designs and by creating a fiscal incentive for media companies to crack down on derivative works. Another group of supporters ("Intellectual Property Professors") objected to broadly expanding copyright to useful-article designs because they considered design patents sufficient. Citing examples of what Congress considered copyrightable in drafting the 1976 law, they argued that extending copyright to uniform designs would unduly stretch Congress's intent to copyright minor detailing on industrial designs, such as like floral engravings on silverware, carvings on the backs of chairs, or printing on T-shirts.

Varsity was endorsed by the Council of Fashion Designers of America, which believed that extending copyright to clothing designs was critical to prevent exploitative copyists and preserve the United States' rapid rate of expansion in the worldwide fashion industry: $370 billion in domestic consumer spending and 1.8 million jobs. The Fashion Law Institute shared these interests, saying that a decision to copyright clothing designs would be a proper reading of the Mazer v. Stein ruling's incorporation into the 1976 Copyright Act. Both criticized the "fast fashion" industry of duplicating expensive designs with increasingly-cheap 3D printing technology without payment to their original creators. The Institute cited "geek fashion," including cosplay, as a burgeoning part of the industry.

The United States government also supported Varsity. The government said that the question of a proper separability analysis was unnecessary because, in creating the designs as drawings, Varsity had received a copyright for them and reserved the ability to reproduce that design however they chose to in any medium. It pointed to a concession from Star Athletica that if Varsity (hypothetically) controlled The Starry Night, the company would be able to restrict the painting's printing on dresses. Star Athletica had conceded this because it was an abstract painting (not a dress design), but the government said that the painting would cover the entire dress surface and was no different than the Varsity designs. It also said that, in applying the requested conceptual-separability analysis, what mattered was that a uniform stripped of the design "remain[ed] similarly useful" compared to the original; a blank dress was equivalent to a designed one, so the design was copyrightable.

=== Oral arguments ===
Oral arguments began on October 31, 2016, with Star Athletica represented by John J. Bursch and Varsity by William M. Jay. Eric Feigin also spoke on Varsity's behalf, representing the United States as an amicus curiae.

Star Athletica's lawyers gave the court examples of the graphic designs' utility. The designs' colors and shapes were arranged to create optical effects such as the Müller-Lyer illusion, changing a cheerleader's appearance to make them look taller, thinner, and generally more appealing. The company considered this distinct from applying a pre-existing two-dimensional image to the uniform because the lines required for the illusions needed to be properly located on a properly-fitted uniform; people often made utilitarian decisions about their clothing to make themselves look better. Those designs on another object, such as a lunchbox, would not serve that utilitarian purpose. Justice Ruth Bader Ginsburg rejected that line of argument, citing the fact that the examples presented in evidence were two-dimensional works. In her view, it did not matter that the submitted designs were "superimposed" on three-dimensional uniforms; they were submitted in two-dimensional images separated from the uniforms and copyrightable. Both parties agreed that the physical, three-dimensional uniform's cut and how it physically framed the body were not copyrightable, and they were interested in the colors and aesthetic designs as applied to the useful article. Ginsburg was uncomfortable with the vagueness she perceived in Star Athletica wanting the court to decide when a given two-dimensional design "is what makes an article utilitarian" when that design could conceivably be placed on anything. Chief Justice John Roberts agreed, adding that the designs did more than sit on the body; they sent a "particular message" (that the wearer was "a member of a cheerleading squad"), and Roberts leaned toward thinking of them as copyrightable.

The court also considered more abstract aspects of the case. For example, it was unclear how a decision in Varsity's favor might affect military-style camouflage patterns, and whether they could be restricted if fashion designs were copyrightable. Varsity supported the idea of camouflage copyrights, although Justice Elena Kagan pointed out the clearly utilitarian function of camouflage patterns: concealment. On the industry side, women's fashion was a concern worth hundreds of billions of dollars worldwide. Justice Stephen Breyer speculated that the price of dresses could conceivably double if copyright terms were applied to designs, and knock-off brands could not compete at lower prices. Breyer and Justice Sonia Sotomayor questioned Varsity about possible monopolization; a uniform design could become part of a school's identity, compelling it to buy exclusively from Varsity for a century of copyright restriction. Breyer was concerned that designers or lawyers might sue over the design of any dress or suit based on generic drawings. Sotomayor, who once represented Fendi in cases brought against knock-offs, wondered if a decision for Varsity would destroy those knock-off brands, and was unsure if that would be a bad thing. Justice Anthony Kennedy wondered if it was "the domain of copyright to [restrict] the way people present themselves to the world." Breyer received media attention for saying of the purpose of fashion, "The clothes on the hanger do nothing; the clothes on the woman do everything," a sentiment Kagan thought was "so romantic."

== Opinion of the court ==
=== Majority opinion ===
Justice Clarence Thomas delivered the majority opinion, which was joined by Chief Justice John Roberts and Justices Alito, Sotomayor, and Kagan. The court defined its task as "whether the lines, chevrons, and colorful shapes appearing on the surface of [Varsity Brands'] cheerleading uniforms are eligible for copyright restriction as separable features of the design of those cheerleading uniforms", and did not consider whether the designs in the case met copyright's threshold of originality. Thomas rejected arguments from Varsity and the United States that separability analysis was unneeded, and did away with all previous lower-court tests. The opinion provided a two-part test, based on the 1976 statute and the Mazer v. Stein decision:

... an artistic feature of the design of a useful article is eligible for copyright protection if the feature (1) can be perceived as a two- or three-dimensional work of art separate from the useful article and (2) would qualify as a protectable pictorial, graphic, or sculptural work either on its own or in some other medium if imagined separately from the useful article.

After applying this test to the cheerleading uniforms, the court ruled in Varsity's favor that the designs were separable from the useful article and could be copyrighted. The separability analysis started with an admittedly-permissive first requirement, describing the designs as separately-identifiable "pictorial, graphic, or sculptural works." The design needed to exist independently, and Thomas concluded that it did when it appeared in other media (such as the two-dimensional drawings submitted to the Copyright Office). In his view, this conceptual separation would not necessarily recreate the useful dress because the design's elements (like the chevrons) could appear on items in different contexts; the graphic design itself did not make a garment a cheerleader uniform, even it appeared on a different kind of clothing. This analysis moved the consideration away from whether the item left after separation was useful, and to whether or not the design itself was useful. A feature incapable of separation was a utilitarian feature, Thomas said.

Addressing concerns that this would grant control over more than the design, Thomas said that the separated aesthetic element could not be a useful article; someone could not copyright a design and then exert control over its physical representation. A drawing (or small model) of a car, copyrighted, could not restrict production of a functional automobile with the same body by a competitor. The car drawing would not suppress a rival car manufacturer in the automobile market, so Varsity's uniform drawing would not suppress Star Athletica in the uniform market because their uniforms could have the same cut.

The final section of the opinion discussed objections to the decision raised by the parties in their briefs. There were no requirements that there be an equivalent useful article remaining after the design element was conceptually removed or that the removed element be "solely artistic." Thomas said that discussions of the blank dress were unnecessary because the statute did not require the remaining work to be useful (or "similarly useful", as the government had put it), because all that mattered was if the separated element was a pictorial, graphic, or sculptural work. He said that adopting this requirement would have overruled Mazer; the statue in that case was considered "applied art" because the 1909 act had removed an earlier distinction between aesthetic and useful works of art. That distinction was not reinstated by the 1976 act, so there was no distinguishing between "conceptual" and "physical" separability.

Thomas rejected Star Athletica's additional, "objective" considerations from preexisting tests that a work be identified as artistic contributions from a designer, independent of its utilitarian purpose, and be marketable without the design's utilitarian function. These were not within the statute and Thomas dismissed them, saying that all that mattered was consumer perception – not the design's intent. About Congress's reluctance to apply copyright to useful articles in general, Thomas said that congressional inaction was not usually a significant judicial argument. He found much of the discussion moot; copyright could not restrict the cut of the design, and copyright coverage did not prevent design patenting.

Thomas rejected the arguments of Justice Breyer's dissent and Star Athletica's similar contention that the designs were uncopyrightable because they would have the same outline as the useful article. He analogized the uniform's design to a mural on a curved dome, saying that the contour of the dome would not make the mural uncopyrightable. He thought that Breyer's traditional view that a preexisting two-dimensional artwork applied to a portion of the clothing could be copyrighted was contradictory; the statute would provide copyright restriction to designs which covered part of the clothing surface, but not to designs that covered all of it. Ginsburg's concurrence agreed on the second point in its notes; portions of Varsity's claimed uniform designs appear on other merchandise, such as T-shirts.

=== Concurring opinion ===
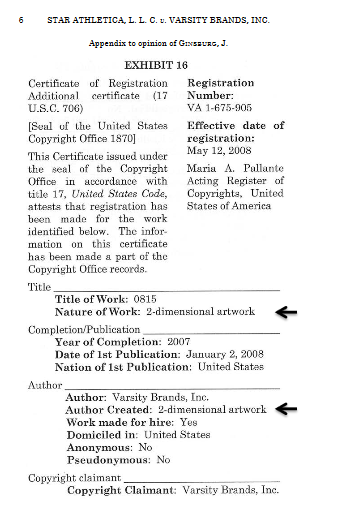
Page six of Justice Ginsburg's concurring opinion, which noted that the designs were registered with the U.S. Copyright Office as two-dimensional artwork

Justice Ginsburg wrote an opinion, concurring that the cheerleading uniform designs were separable without joining in the majority's reasoning, and emphasized that the copyrights were not registered for the useful articles of clothing; the registrations were for pictorial and graphic works which were then reproduced on the clothing. Because the Copyright Act of 1976 provided copyright claimants "the right to reproduce the work in or on any kind of article, whether useful or otherwise," the claimant of a pictorial, graphic, or sculptural work's copyright could restrict others from reproducing the work's elements on their useful articles. According to Ginsburg, there was no need for the court to address the separability-analysis issue. She attached to her decision several pages of applications submitted by Varsity Brands to the Copyright Office, pointing to their claimed types of work: "2-dimensional artwork" or "fabric design (artwork)." In her notes, Ginsburg said that she did not take a stand about whether or not Varsity's designs were original enough for copyright; she referred to Feist Publications, Inc., v. Rural Telephone Service Co., quoting its conclusion that "the requisite level of creativity [for copyrightability] is extremely low; even a slight amount will suffice."

=== Dissent ===
Justices Breyer dissented, and Justice Kennedy joined him. While Breyer agreed with much of the majority's reasoning, he disagreed with the framing and application of the majority's test and concluded that the design was not separable from the uniform as a useful article. Breyer also criticized what he considered vagueness in the majority's test. He thought that under it, "virtually any industrial design" could be considered separable as soon as it was thought of in terms of art, whether giving it a picture frame or merely calling an object "art" (like a Marcel Duchamp series). Breyer's approach to the problem was to interpret what "identified separately" meant in the context of the statute. His reading was that to be separable, the design features needed to be physically separable from the article (leaving the utilitarian object functional) or the design features needed to be conceivably separable without conjuring a picture of the utilitarian object in a person's mind. He returned to Mazer v. Stein and applied his reasoning to two lamps, one with a Siamese cat statuette for a pole and one with a brass-rod pole and a cat statuette attached to its base. On the base, the cat could be physically separable and was copyrightable as a figurine. When the cat was the pole, it could not be physically separated; it could be conceptually separated from the context of the lamp without conjuring the idea of a lamp, however, and was copyrightable as a figurine. Applying his version of the test to the cheerleader uniforms, he found that the design was not physically separable. Picturing the design separately would reveal a cheerleader uniform "coextensive with that design and cut", so the design and useful article were not conceptually separable either.

Breyer then considered shoes painted by Vincent van Gogh and turned to the examples of Congress's intended targets of copyright in the amicus curiae brief filed by the Intellectual Property Professors. He found that copyrighting those embellishments was not the same as copyrighting an entire cheerleading uniform design; those examples were conceptually separable, while the uniform design was not. Breyer reiterated that van Gogh could certainly have received a copyright to prevent people from reproducing his painting, but the request in Star Athletica was an injunction against reproducing uniforms; he felt that this decision would be equivalent to giving van Gogh a design copyright which could prevent others from producing those shoes. He accused Varsity Brands of trying to acquire copyrights to "prevent its competitors from making useful three-dimensional cheerleader uniforms by submitting plainly unoriginal chevrons and stripes as cut and arranged on a useful article."

Breyer studied the state of the fashion industry at the time of the decision. Recent Congresses had rejected 70 bills to extend copyright to cover designs on useful articles, which he interpreted as an unwillingness of lawmakers to enact the change. He cited the metrics provided by the Varsity amici Council of Fashion Designers of America to show that the fashion industry was successful without copyright and quoted warnings from Thomas Jefferson and Thomas Babington Macaulay against wantonly expanding copyright monopolies. Seeing no pressing need to extend the restriction, he did not want to overstep the bounds of the Constitution's Copyright Clause, especially when the available design patents afforded fifteen years of restriction and copyright could offer more than a century.

== Subsequent developments ==
=== Immediate reactions ===
Varsity Brands's leadership and supporters were pleased by the decision. Varsity founder Jeff Webb said that it was a win for "the basic idea that designers everywhere can create excellent work and make investments in their future without fear of having it stolen or copied." Susan Scafidi, founder of the Fashion Law Institute, had been involved with the case from the district-court level and was sorry that it had to go all the way to the Supreme Court. However, she praised Thomas's decision as a maintenance of the status quo based on the copyrightability of fabric patterns. Although it was important to her because she believed that fashion designers deserved to restrict their designs with copyright, she did not think that it would change things for designers because it was based on the language of the preexisting statute.

On March 31, 2017, Puma sued Forever 21 for alleged violations of Puma's intellectual-property rights. Puma based the copyright-infringement portion of its case on the nine-day-old precedent, and said that Forever 21 shoes included copyrighted elements of similar Puma products. Forever 21, a supplier of knock-offs, had been sued for copyright infringement in the past; this was among the first times that a company used the argument that, in the case of Puma's Fenty Fur Slides, their "wide plush fur strap extending to the base of the sandal" was capable of being represented in another medium and was covered by copyright as separable from the shoe itself. Puma claimed "a casually knotted satin bow with pointed endings atop a satin-lined side strap that extends to the base of the sandal" was a copyrighted element on its Bow Slides. Forever 21 responded with a detailed motion to dismiss which said that the Fenti line resembled prior art. The companies settled in November 2018.

The United States Copyright Office, arbiter of copyright registration, updated its Compendium of rules for validating registrations with preliminary rules taking the Star Athletica developments into account. The report, published on September 29, 2017, said that useful articles and (specifically) clothing articles were not copyrightable. About two-dimensional visual designs applied to useful articles, the Compendium reduced its 2014 discussion of the copyrightability of designs of useful articles to one section in the 2017 guide which quoted Star Athletica's two-step separability test. A note indicated that the office was "developing updated guidance" on the matter for a future version of the report. The office released a draft of the new edition of the Compendium on March 15, 2019, including new material which addressed Star Athletica.

=== Case resolution ===
The case was passed back to the district court in Tennessee and, in August 2017, was settled out of court in favor of Varsity Brands (over Star Athletica's objection) by Star Athletica's insurance company. Star Athletica wanted to press a counter-claim after the Supreme Court's ruling that designs on the uniforms could be copyrightable with an argument that the particular Varsity designs in the case should not be copyrightable due to their simplicity. The settlement precluded that argument and closed the case with prejudice.

=== Legal analyses ===
Intellectual property attorneys were split about the opinion; some thought that it clarified the law, and others thought that it made the law more ambiguous. Clarity notwithstanding, many have noted that Star Athletica was an important case for the fashion industry because it overturned the prevailing wisdom that fashion designs were generally uncopyrightable. The effects of this shift in thought remain to be seen, however, as more designers apply for copyrights and awareness of the change grows. Negative effects on fashion trends (which involve some degree of copying basic styles among designers throughout the industry) and an anticipated increase in infringement lawsuits have been speculated. Generic or "knock-off" clothing could cease to exist due to the restriction of the designer brands' designs, although designer brands were also accused of copying independent artists before the decision.

In its broad interpretation of the statute, the ruling did not make conclusive determinations about competition and copyright. Columbia Law School professor Ronald Mann analyzed the decision for SCOTUSblog, saying that the court's opinion did not address the minimal threshold of creativity required for copyright restriction under Feist v. Rural. Mann called Thomas's dismissal of the opposing arguments "half-hearted" and predicted that scholarly debate of the separability test's shift in copyright law would continue.

Professors Jeanne C. Fromer and Mark P. McKenna criticized the decision's ambiguity; the three major stages of litigation resulted in three different majority decisions on three different grounds, with more divergent opinions in the dissents and concurrence. The courts allowed Varsity to define extremely narrow copyright restrictions in the registration and then sue others (such as Star Athletica) with court filings that only described the designs generally, so Fromer and McKenna were concerned that this disconnect in requirements would lead to more controversial lawsuits (even outside the useful-article realm). A model car could be copyrighted as a sculpture, a drawing of that model could be copyrighted, and the claimant could use the features of either to file copyright claims. Which features of either were actually restricted was left up to debate, because the registration's description could diverge from a lawsuit. Fromer and McKenna said that it would be impossible to know what the copyright holder considered restricted before they described it in a lawsuit or before the second party began copying. In the absence of a description, they said that it was impossible to perform a separability analysis and determine if the feature was copyrightable before litigation began.

==== Expanded separability ====
The Harvard Law Review said that Star Athletica was an important step towards removing subjectivity from the tests in this area of the law, removing the framing problem which changed the outcome of the analysis based on the definition of article usefulness. The decision may not fully resolve conflicting lower-court rulings, however, because its majority and dissent were based on close readings of the statute without enough differentiating examples in the majority to discredit the alternative view. Potential contradictions in Thomas's majority opinion (assertions that surface designs are "inherently separable" from useful articles without being useful articles themselves, and other clothing with the design do not conjure the original useful article) may muddy the waters. According to the Review, "These dicta imply that the independently existing work can have the shape and look of the article, evoke the same concepts, and even perform the same function and still be separable" (making it copyrightable).

Silvertop Assocs., Inc. v. Kangaroo Mfg., Inc., a 2018 district court case, ruled that a banana costume's physical features were separable from the costume and copyrightable because they could be painted on a canvas. It was upheld on appeal the following year. In February 2019, however, the Copyright Office's review board used Star Athletica as a justification for refusing to register the design of a work glove. The office determined that it failed the second step of the test because panels on the back of the hand and other features of the glove were "apparently deliberately engineered and repeatedly tested to qualify with ANSI cut-level standards while allowing finger and hand movement." The office determined that the design was not sufficiently original to be copyrightable because its "common and familiar uncopyrightable shapes" conformed to the human hand "in the most predictable manner."

In 2019, the office's decision to register the Adidas Yeezy Boost 350 shoe design was considered a significant expansion of the copyrightability of useful articles in the wake of Star Athletica. The Copyright Office rejected the designs twice, followed by requests for reconsideration by Adidas. The 2017 refusal, immediately after Star Athletica, was because the shoes were a useful article (a common response from the office then). The 2018 refusal was because the Copyright Office determined that the shoes' design did not meet the originality requirement. On its third consideration, the office determined that the two- and three-dimensional designs could be perceived separately from the shoes and their design's individually-uncopyrightable elements combined to overcome the originality requirement. The Yeezy's color design overcoming the originality requirement may spur fashion companies to pursue copyright more aggressively for designs more complex than basic shape variations. The Yeezy designs had already been restricted by the design-patent system, so the Copyright Office's decision was also read to establish that copyright was an acceptable addition to design patents for useful articles in general and clothing in particular. This was an outcome the Intellectual Property Professors and Justice Breyer feared while Star Athletica was under consideration, although Justice Thomas said that they were "not mutually exclusive" according to Mazer v. Stein.

==== Other analyses ====
For cosplayers, the decision made the possibility of lawsuits by copyright holders and official licensees less unlikely. Different parts of costumes may be subject to different levels of restriction, where fair use and utility are not clear; the shape of a superhero's mask could be considered more ornamental than useful. Cosplay props which are not clothing might be even more easily restricted because they are not a necessary element of a costume's function as clothing. Unauthorized replicas of these items may involve more legal hazard than before Star Athletica. Meredith Rose, policy counsel of Public Knowledge and involved in the group's cosplay amicus brief, later wrote for the group that fair-use rights could still apply to cosplay. Rose agreed that ornamental designs and props could be restricted more easily because "when copyright law looks at props, cosplay armor, and accessories, it sees sculptures", but said that cosplay was not going anywhere because the companies behind pop culture had embraced and encouraged it.

Star Athletica caused uncertainty in the 3D-printing community; 3D printing was a relatively-new field, and the rules could have outsized effects on the development of its cultural norms. Shapeways, one of the amici, criticized the court's test because it prioritized artistic considerations over the utility of an item. In its view, this made the test easier but inappropriately expanded copyright in ways which would impact its interests. The company said that a better test would have first considered an item's function, removing parts which accomplished that task from copyright consideration.

Sara Benson, a lawyer who agreed with the decision, wondered if the court's rejection of a copyrightability test which valued artistic effort on the designer's part may harm the perception of a designer's value to their clients. Benson said that the test had allowed designers to leverage their creativity for respect and credibility during the corporate design process, and its removal may have removed some of their negotiating power.

David Kluft of Foley Hoag said that the new ability to copyright design elements is accompanied by criminal penalties if the elements have utility. If the entity applying for copyright of a design knew about that utility, it would be considered false representation of a material fact in its copyright registration.

Uncertainty exists about how this decision may impact the copyrightability of food. Top chefs had been seeking copyrightability for years before Star Athletica, and some prohibiting customers from taking photographs of the food because of a supposed copyright restriction. According to the pre-Star Athletica interpretation of separability, the copyrightability of food as a sculpture with artistic features did not contribute to its purpose as a consumable. James P. Flynn of Epstein Becker & Green wondered if Star Athletica might have changed the fate of served food.
