= Copyright Act of 1870 =

Former United States law

- Other short titles: Patent Act of 1870, Trade Mark Act of 1870
- Long title: An Act to revise, consolidate, and amend the statutes relating to patents and copyrights.
- Effective: July 8, 1870

Citations
- Statutes at Large: 16 Stat. 198

Legislative history
- Signed into law by President Ulysses S. Grant on July 8, 1870

Major amendments
- 1874, 1891

United States Supreme Court cases
- Trade-Mark Cases

The Copyright Act of 1870, also called the Patent Act of 1870 and the Trade Mark Act of 1870, was a revision to United States intellectual property law, covering copyrights and patents. Eight sections of the bill, sometimes called the Trade Mark Act of 1870, introduced trademarks to United States federal law, although that portion was later deemed unconstitutional after the Trade-Mark Cases.

== Copyright ==
For copyrights, the act codified the right of authors to make dramatizations and translations of literary works; copyright had previously been denied to translations by the holding in Stowe v. Thomas (1853), in which Harriet Beecher Stowe unsuccessfully sued for infringement over a translation of Uncle Tom's Cabin into German. It also established a legal deposit requirement for copyrighted works; two copies of each work were to be submitted to the Library of Congress.

=== Copyright amendments ===
The act was amended several times for various purposes.

- In 1873, Congress gave jurisdiction of copyright cases to federal courts.
- In 1874, they added a requirement of notice via the phrase "Entered according to act of Congress, in the year ____ by ____, in the office of the Librarian of Congress, at Washington" or "Copyright" paired with the year and author's name.
- Also in 1874, copyrights for prints and labels in manufactured goods were put under the jurisdiction of the Patent Office.
- In 1879, the Post Office Appropriations Act arguably made it illegal to mail copyright infringing works.
- In 1882, copyright notices for designs on useful articles were allowed to be placed on the back or bottom of those articles.
- In 1891, the International Copyright Act of 1891 passed.
- In 1893, Congress granted amnesty to late deposits of books for copyright and allowed all to send in their works for protection by March 1. The Act passed on March 3.
- In 1895, the Printing Act of 1895 codified the Wheaton v. Peters decision and stated explicitly that "no Government publications shall be copyrighted."
- Also in 1895, the penalties for infringing the copyright of photographs were limited at the request of newspapers.
- In 1897, Congress allowed the restriction of public performances of musical compositions and added criminal penalties if the illicit performance was for profit.
- Also in 1897, Congress established the Register of Copyrights. Thorvald Solberg entered office later that year.
- A third amendment in 1897 extended a $100 penalty for affixing a false copyright notice to a product to anyone who knowingly created, sold, or imported works with false notices. This included new copies of copyrighted works without the required notice and issuing the work under someone else's name.
- In 1904, in response to foreign countries threatening to boycott the Louisiana Purchase Exposition, Congress passed an amendment that provided ad interim copyrights to foreign works that lasted for two years. They did not have to follow the manufacturing or notice requirements, but they were entitled to a full 42 years of restriction if they did.
- In 1905, another ad interim copyright law amended the law to satisfy France and Germany in response to threats to repeal copyright treaties.
- Although it was not implemented with legislation, the United States entered the Mexico City Convention in 1908.

== Patents ==
The Act reorganized the United States Patent Office, and strengthened the authority of the Patent Office to determine who would be granted a patent in cases where there was a dispute between the first to invent and the first to file. It also empowered the Patent Office to begin printing, and dropped the requirement that applicants submit two copies of their applications (which had been implemented after multiple conflagrations in the Patent Office destroyed large numbers of patent records).

== Trademarks ==
Sections 77 through 84 represented the first attempt by the United States of formally recognizing trademarks. Its presence in the Copyright Act lead to significant confusion and confounding of the copyright and trademark concepts. For example, Mark Twain, an author who treated that pseudonym as a brand, began asserting copyright in that pseudonym and sued several people for copyright and trademark infringement, mostly unsuccessfully. Ultimately, the Trade-Mark Cases of 1879 ruled this portion of the law unconstitutional because Congress had used invoked the Copyright Clause as their justification for trademark by including it in the Copyright Act. The Supreme Court determined that was inappropriate because "a trade-mark is neither an invention, a discovery, nor a writing, within the meaning of [the Copyright Clause]." Congress passed the Trade Mark Act of 1881 to reintroduce trademarks, justified by the Commerce Clause instead.
