= List of United States Supreme Court cases, volume 347 =

This is a list of all the United States Supreme Court cases from volume 347 of the United States Reports:

Case name	Citation	Date decided
Pereira v. United States	347 U.S. 1	1954
Radio Officers' Union v. NLRB	347 U.S. 17	1954
Walder v. United States	347 U.S. 62	1954
W. Air Lines, Inc. v. CAB	347 U.S. 67	1954
Delta Air Lines, Inc. v. Summerfield	347 U.S. 74	1954
United States v. City of New Britain	347 U.S. 81	1954
Partmar Corp. v. Paramount Pictures Theatres Corp.	347 U.S. 89	1954
Kern-Limerick, Inc. v. Scurlock	347 U.S. 110	1954
Irvine v. California	347 U.S. 128	1954
Mich.-Wis. Pipe Line Co. v. Calvert	347 U.S. 157	1954
United States v. Binghamton Constr. Co.	347 U.S. 171	1954
Adams v. Maryland	347 U.S. 179	1954
United States v. Employing Plasterers Ass'n	347 U.S. 186	1954
United States v. Employing Lathers Ass'n	347 U.S. 198	1954
Mazer v. Stein	347 U.S. 201	1954
Longshoremen v. Boyd	347 U.S. 222	1954
Remmer v. United States	347 U.S. 227	1954
Walters v. City of St. Louis	347 U.S. 231	1954
FPC v. Niagara Mohawk Power Corp.	347 U.S. 239	1954
United States ex rel. Accardi v. Shaughnessy	347 U.S. 260	1954
Alabama v. Texas	347 U.S. 272	1954
FCC v. American Broadcasting Co., Inc.	347 U.S. 284	1954
St. Joe Paper Co. v. Atl. Coast Line R.R. Co.	347 U.S. 298	1954
Thompson v. Lawson	347 U.S. 334	1954
Miller Bros. Co. v. Maryland	347 U.S. 340	1954
Ry. Express Agency, Inc. v. Virginia	347 U.S. 359	1954
Franklin Nat'l Bank v. New York	347 U.S. 373	1954
United States v. Dixon (1954)	347 U.S. 381	1954
Sacher v. Ass'n of Bar of City of New York	347 U.S. 388	1954
Alaska S.S. Co. v. Petterson	347 U.S. 396	1954
Brownell v. Singer	347 U.S. 403	1954
Md. Casualty Co. v. Cushing	347 U.S. 409	1954
Linehan v. Waterfront Comm'n	347 U.S. 439	1954
Barsky v. Univ. of N. Y.	347 U.S. 442	1954
Hernandez v. Texas	347 U.S. 475	1954
Brown v. Board of Education	347 U.S. 483	1954
Bolling v. Sharpe	347 U.S. 497	1954
Capital Service, Inc. v. NLRB	347 U.S. 501	1954
United States v. Gilman	347 U.S. 507	1954
United States v. Borden Co.	347 U.S. 514	1954
United Shoe Mach. Corp. v. United States	347 U.S. 521	1954
Galvan v. Press	347 U.S. 522	1954
Allen v. Grand Cent. Aircraft Co.	347 U.S. 535	1954
Leyra v. Denno	347 U.S. 556	1954
Braniff Airways, Inc. v. Neb. Bd. of Equalization	347 U.S. 590	1954
Alton v. Alton	347 U.S. 610	1954
United States v. Harriss	347 U.S. 612	1954
Barber v. Gonzales	347 U.S. 637	1954
Sec'y of Agric. v. United States	347 U.S. 645	1954
Construction Workers v. Laburnum Constr. Corp.	347 U.S. 656	1954
Phillips Petroleum Co. v. Wisconsin	347 U.S. 672	1954
