= A&M Records, Inc. v. Napster, Inc. =

US legal case

- Court: United States Court of Appeals for the Ninth Circuit
- Full case name: A&M Records, Inc. v. Napster, Inc.
- Argued: October 2, 2000
- Decided: February 12, 2001
- Citation: 239 F.3d 1004

Holding
- Napster could be held liable for contributory and vicarious copyright infringement, affirming the District Court holding.

Court membership
- Judges sitting: Mary M. Schroeder, Richard Paez, Robert Beezer

Case opinions
- Majority: Robert Beezer

Laws applied
- 17 U.S.C. § 501, 17 U.S.C. §106

A&M Records, Inc. v. Napster, Inc., 239 F.3d 1004 (9th. Cir., 2001) was a landmark intellectual property case in which the United States Court of Appeals for the Ninth Circuit affirmed a district court ruling that the defendant, peer-to-peer file sharing service Napster, could be held liable for contributory infringement and vicarious infringement of copyright. This was the first major case to address the application of copyright laws to peer-to-peer file sharing.

While A&M Records served as the lead plaintiff, Napster was sued by 18 different record companies, all of which were members of the Recording Industry Association of America (RIAA). Additionally, songwriters Jerry Leiber and Mike Stoller were included on the Circuit Court appeal, representing the interests of "all others similarly situated."

== Background ==
Napster was founded in 1999 by 18 year-old Shawn Fanning. Napster provided a platform for users to download compressed digital music files, specifically MP3s, from other users' music libraries. Unlike many peer-to-peer services, however, Napster included a central server that indexed connected users and files available on their machines, creating a searchable list of music available across Napster's network. Napster's ease of use compared to other peer-to-peer services quickly made it a popular service for music enthusiasts to find and download digital song files for free.

The legacy record industry immediately took action against what it believed to be unauthorized copying of its copyrighted musical works within the Napster service. The first suit was filed at the United States District Court for the Northern District of California.

== District Court opinion ==
The record companies alleged both contributory and vicarious copyright infringement by Napster, and filed a motion for a preliminary injunction in order to stop the exchange of the plaintiffs' songs on the service immediately.

Judge Marilyn Hall Patel of the United States District Court for the Northern District of California granted the preliminary injunction, on the grounds that the plaintiffs demonstrated a reasonable likelihood of success. The injunction immediately prohibited Napster "from engaging in, or facilitating others in copying, downloading, uploading, transmitting, or distributing plaintiffs' copyrighted musical compositions and sound recordings, protected by either federal or state law, without express permission of the rights owner."

Napster appealed this ruling to United States Court of Appeals for the Ninth Circuit, and requested a stay on Patel's injunction so it could continue its operations until the dispute was resolved.

== Circuit Court opinion ==
On appeal, the Ninth Circuit granted Napster's request for a stay of the District Court's injunction, pending resolution. This allowed Napster to continue its operations until the rendering of a judgment at the end of the hearings. On the matter of direct copyright infringement, the Circuit Court agreed with the District Court's determination that Napster users were likely engaging in direct infringement of the plaintiffs' copyrights.

=== Fair use ===
The Circuit Court dedicated much more of its opinion to Napster's attempted application of the fair use defense. The Circuit Court agreed with the District Court's "general analysis of Napster system uses" as well as with its analysis of the three types of fair use alleged by Napster, which were "sampling, where users make temporary copies of a work before purchasing; space shifting, where users access a sound recording through the Napster system that they already own in audio CD format; and permissive distribution of recordings by both new and established artists."

The court first considered these four factors required for the fair use defense:

1. Downloading an MP3 is not transformative, and even though Napster did not directly benefit financially from users' downloads (it did not charge for the service), its "repeated and exploitative copying of copyrighted works, even if the copies are not offered for sale" could be considered a commercial use that requires authorization from copyright holders.
2. Creative works, such as the songs in question, are "closer to the core of intended copyright protection", thus favoring the plaintiffs.
3. In some cases, wholesale copying of a work may be allowable, with time shifting as an example.
4. Widespread wholesale transfer of plaintiffs' music negatively affected the market for CD sales and jeopardized the record industry's future in digital markets.

Thus, the Circuit Court rejected Napster's argument that file sharing by its users qualified for the fair use defense. Napster's claims that it enabled legal sampling, space shifting, and permissive distribution (some artists had consented to the presence of their songs on the Napster service) were also rejected by the court. Furthermore, the court found that Napster could control the infringing behavior of the service's users, and therefore had a duty to do so. Therefore, Napster did not have a valid fair use defense.

=== Contributory infringement ===
The district court had ruled that the "law does not require knowledge of 'specific acts of infringement'," and rejected Napster's assertion that, because it could not distinguish between infringing and non-infringing files, it did not have knowledge of copyright infringement by its users. The Ninth Circuit upheld this conclusion, holding that Napster had "knowledge, both actual and constructive, of direct infringement."

The Ninth Circuit also held that Napster was not protected under Sony Corp. of America v. Universal City Studios, Inc., in which the Supreme Court ruled that media copying technologies were acceptable if they were unlikely to cause widespread copyright infringement beyond the original user. Because of Napster's "actual, specific knowledge of direct infringement," and the unlikelihood of non-infringing uses of Napster, "[W]e are compelled to make a clear distinction between the architecture of the Napster system and Napster's conduct in relation to the operational capacity of the system." Thus, the Circuit Court ruled in favor of the plaintiffs' contributory infringement claim against Napster.

=== Vicarious infringement ===
Addressing the vicarious infringement claim, the Ninth Circuit determined that Napster stood to benefit financially from the infringing activity, due to the network effects of potentially selling advertising space for a large population of users, and that Napster's ability to patrol and enforce infringing usage was limited by the design of the system itself. The system was not designed to read the contents of MP3s or check for copyright ownership or permissions. Because of Napster's failure to police within its means combined with the financial interest factor, the Ninth Circuit affirmed the District Court's finding of vicarious infringement.

=== Other defenses ===
In its defense against the injunction, Napster also cited the Audio Home Recording Act (17 U.S.C. §§ 1001). and the Digital Millennium Copyright Act's safe harbor clause (17 U.S.C. § 512), claiming that Napster users only made allowable copies of files for their personal use, with no interest in wider distribution of unauthorized copies. The Ninth Circuit agreed with the District Court's finding that downloading MP3 files is not covered by the Audio Home Recording Act because online file sharing could spread unauthorized copies much more quickly than older forms of analog tape trading.

Napster also argued that the record companies waived their rights to copyright protection because they "hastened" the spread of MP3s on the Internet and had their own plans to get into the digital market. The Ninth Circuit rejected Napster's claim that, by creating and providing digital files via the Internet, the plaintiffs had granted Napster an "implied license" to enable the copying of music files. Finally, Napster argued that the plaintiffs were misusing copyright law to control online distribution, which Napster considered beyond the scope of the limited ownership rights provided by copyright. The court rejected this argument as well, finding that MP3s were the same works as those that appeared on CDs, just in a different format, thus the plaintiffs had the ownership right to control the distribution of digital music.

=== Scope of the injunction ===
Napster contended that the original District Court injunction shutting down its operations violated the company's First Amendment rights because it was overbroad and restricted other user activities beyond copyright infringement. While the Ninth Circuit rejected this argument due to Napster's unsuccessful fair use defense for copyright infringement, it did order a stay of the original injunction and agreed that it was overbroad because "it places on Napster the entire burden of ensuring that no 'copying, downloading, uploading, transmitting, or distributing' of plaintiffs' works occur on the system."

Recognizing that Napster's system simply indexed files with imperfect file names and did not automatically verify copyright ownership, the Circuit Court found that it was the plaintiffs' burden to notify Napster of any infringing files on the system, which Napster would then remove. But the court also again noted that Napster must police the system within its means: "In crafting the injunction on remand, the district court should recognize that Napster's system does not currently appear to allow Napster access to users' MP3 files."

=== Outcome ===
To determine whether Napster should be permitted to continue functioning, the Circuit Court remanded the case back to the District Court for another trial in which Napster would be required to show that it could keep track of user activities on its network and restrict access to infringing material by its users. Napster was unable to comply and thus had to close down its service in July 2001. The following year, Napster filed for bankruptcy and sold its assets to a third party. The new owners of the Napster name planned to use it for a subscription-based music service, the proceeds from which would be used in a settlement songwriters and music publishers in the amount of $26 million.

== Criticism and impact ==
Among a number of amicus briefs filed on behalf of both sides of the dispute, one particularly critical brief filed by a consortium of eighteen American copyright law professors argued that the district court misread the Sony precedent and took too narrow a view of fair use. The professors argued that the overbroad nature of the injunction threatened the development and deployment of future peer-to-peer file-sharing networks on the Internet because it insisted on a restructuring that defeated peer-to-peer technology itself. They also argued that the finding of contributory liability was erroneous because of Napster's significant non-infringing uses and because not all unauthorized uses within the system were copyright infringement. They concluded: "If Plaintiffs want copyright law extended to allow the suppression of new technologies, they must make their case to Congress."

A number of file-sharing networks surfaced in Napster's wake, including Morpheus, Grokster, and KaZaA, many of which faced their own legal challenges over infringing behavior by their users. In 2005, MGM Studios, Inc. v. Grokster, Ltd. was heard by the Supreme Court and is considered by many to be the sequel to the Napster case, addressing another technology that "outpaced the law." In the following years, BitTorrent, another P2P technology, became the target of copyright scrutiny. Popular torrent trackers like the Pirate Bay faced long legal battles, but their opponents have had little success in shutting down these services permanently.

== See also ==
- MGM Studios, Inc. v. Grokster, Ltd. (2005).
