= Fashion Originators Guild of America =

American trade organization

The Fashion Originators Guild of America (FOGA) and its members made and sold medium– and high–priced, fashionable women's dresses to retailers, who select their purchases from designs exhibited in show rooms in New York City. The members made their dresses from their own "original designs." The designs were not protected by patents or copyrights, which are not available for clothing, and therefore other dress manufacturers (so-called "style pirates") made and sold unauthorized copies.

== Mission ==
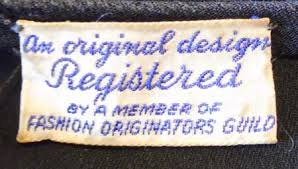
FOGA label from a 1930s dress

The Guild was organized in 1932 to protect its members from "piracy," which they said was an unfair and tortious invasion of their rights. "Because of these alleged wrongs, petitioners . . . combined among themselves to combat and, if possible, destroy all competition from the sale of garments which are copies of their original creations."

== Activities ==
The Guild and its members agreed to refuse to sell any dresses to retailers who purchased, or ordered to be manufactured, dresses which the Guild found embodied copies of its members' designs. For that purpose the Guild set up a "Piracy Committee," which decided which of the designs registered by its members were original. It then employed shoppers in various parts of the country who visited the shops of retailers and report delinquents: if a retailer was found to be selling "pirated designs", it must stop doing so, or else it would get no more dresses from the Guild's members; nor would it be allowed to see the designs exhibited in the Guild's New York show rooms.

== Agreement ==
Retailers that co-operated with the Guild had to agree to accept the decision of the Piracy Committee, and to return to sellers any dresses that had been "pirated." Furthermore, they had to warrant to customers that the designs of the dresses they sold had not been "pirated." As a result of the Guild's efforts, approximately 12,000 retailers signed agreements to "cooperate" with the Guild's boycott program.

== See also ==
- Fashion Group International
