= Mazer v. Stein =

- Supreme Court of the United States

Argued December 3, 1953 Decided March 8, 1954
- Full case name: Mazer v. Stein
- Citations: 347 U.S. 201 (more) 74 S. Ct. 460; 98 L. Ed. 630

Case history
- Prior: Certiorari to the United States Court of Appeals for the Fourth Circuit

Holding
- Copyright may extend to mass-produced items, even though just the aesthetic form, not the mechanical or utilitarian aspects.

Court membership
- Chief Justice Earl Warren Associate Justices Hugo Black · Stanley F. Reed; Felix Frankfurter · William O. Douglas; Robert H. Jackson · Harold H. Burton; Tom C. Clark · Sherman Minton

Case opinions
- Majority: Reed, joined by Warren, Frankfurter, Jackson, Burton, Clark, Minton
- Concurrence: Douglas, joined by Black
- Superseded by
- Copyright Act of 1976; Star Athletica, LLC v. Varsity Brands, Inc.

Mazer v. Stein, 347 U.S. 201 (1954), was a copyright case decided by the United States Supreme Court. In an opinion written by Justice Stanley F. Reed, the Supreme Court held that the statuettes—male and female dancing figures made of semivitreous china—used as bases for fully equipped electric lamps were copyrightable, even though the lamp itself was a utilitarian mass-produced item.

The case is notable for the quotation, "Unlike a patent, a copyright gives no exclusive right to the art disclosed; protection is given only to the expression of the idea—not the idea itself." 347 U.S. at 217 (citing F. W. Woolworth Co. v. Contemporary Arts, 193 F.2d 162; Ansehl v. Puritan Pharmaceutical Co., 61 F.2d 131; Fulmer v. United States, 122 Ct. Cl. 195, 103 F.Supp. 1021; Muller v. Triborough Bridge Authority, 43 F.Supp. 298.)

Congress incorporated the Mazer decision into the Copyright Act of 1976 as the concept of separability. For many years, there was confusion over how to determine separability, so tests proliferated and competed against one another. The Supreme Court addressed this issue in the 2017 case Star Athletica, LLC v. Varsity Brands, Inc. and created a canonical test for separability.

== See also ==
- List of United States Supreme Court cases, volume 347
- Idea–expression divide
- Star Athletica, L. L. C. v. Varsity Brands, Inc. - 2017 case to determine when a "pictorial, graphic, or sculptural feature" incorporated into a useful article is eligible for copyright protection
