= Federal Regulation of Lobbying Act of 1946 =

The Federal Regulation of Lobbying Act of 1946 is a statute enacted by the United States Congress to reduce the influence of lobbyists. The primary purpose of the Act was to provide information to members of Congress about those that lobby them. The 1946 Act was replaced by the Lobbying Disclosure Act of 1995.

== Selected provisions ==
§ 308: Registration of Lobbyists With Secretary of the Senate and Clerk of the House "(a) Any person who shall engage himself for pay or for any consideration for the purpose of attempting to influence the passage or defeat of any legislation by the Congress of the United States shall, before doing anything in furtherance of such object, register with the Clerk of the House of Representatives and the Secretary of the Senate and shall give to those officers in writing and under oath, his/her/they name and business address, the name and address of the person by whom he/she/them is employed, and in whose interest she/they/he appears or works, the duration of such employment, how much she/he/they is paid and is to receive, by whom she/they/he is paid or is to be paid, how much she/they/he is to be paid for expenses, and what expenses are to be included . . . "

§ 307: Persons to Whom Applicable "The Provisions of this act apply to any person (except a political committee as defined in the Federal Corrupt Practices Act, and duly organized State or local committees of a political party), who by herself/themselves/himself, or through any agent or employee or other persons in any manner whatsoever, directly or indirectly, solicits, collects, or receives money or any other thing of value to be used principally to aid, or which the principal purpose of which person is to aid, in the accomplishment of any of the following purposes:

- (a) The passage or defeat of any legislation by the Congress of the United States.
- (b) To influence, directly or indirectly, the passage or defeat of any legislation by the Congress of the United States."

== United States v. Harriss ==
In 1954, The Supreme Court Upheld the Federal Regulation of Lobbying Act, but narrowed its scope significantly. The Court determined that it applied only to paid lobbyists who directly communicated with members of Congress on pending legislation. This created a number of loopholes including:

- It does not regulate people who give money to influence legislation, only those who solicit or collect money
- It does not define "principally." A lobbyist can argue that his principal goal is not influencing legislation
- It does not include those who communicate with Congressional Staffers

== See also ==
- Lobbying in the United States
- Legislative Reorganization Act of 1946
