= Contributory copyright infringement =

Form of secondary liability in copyright law

Contributory copyright infringement is a way of imposing secondary liability for infringement of a copyright. It is a means by which a person may be held liable for copyright infringement even though they did not directly engage in the infringing activity. It is one of the two forms of secondary liability apart from vicarious liability. Contributory infringement is understood to be a form of infringement in which a person is not directly violating a copyright but induces or authorizes another person to directly infringe the copyright.

This doctrine is a development of general tort law and is an extension of the principle in tort law that in addition to the tortfeasor, anyone who contributed to the tort should also be held liable.

== Requirements ==
The requirements for fulfilling the threshold of contributory infringement and imposing liability for copyright infringement on a party are:

1. The defendant having knowledge of a direct infringement; and
2. The defendant materially contributing to that infringement.

Contributory infringement leads to imposition of liability in two situations. First situation is when the defendant, through their conduct, assists in the infringement, and the second situation is when the means for facilitating the infringement such as machinery is provided by the defendant.

=== Knowledge ===
The knowledge requirement for contributory infringement is an objective assessment and stands fulfilled if the defendant has actual or constructive knowledge of an infringement, i.e., if they has reason to believe that an infringement is taking place. But, constructive knowledge need not be imputed to the defendant if the product was capable of significant noninfringing uses.

=== Material contribution ===
Material contribution is the second requirement of contributory infringement. For instance, merely providing facilities for the site for an infringement might amount to material contribution. But, some courts put emphasis on the contribution to be 'substantial' and therefore, would hold that providing equipment and facilities for infringement is not in itself determinative of material contribution.

== Difference from vicarious liability ==
Vicarious liability is another form of secondary liability for copyright infringement through which a person who himself has not directly infringed a copyright can, nevertheless, be held liable. The requirements for attracting vicarious liability under copyright law are:

1. The defendant had the right to control the infringing activity; and
2. The defendant derives a financial or commercial benefit from the infringement

Unlike contributory infringement, vicarious liability can be imposed even in the absence of any intent or knowledge on part of the defendant. In the A&M Records, Inc. v. Napster, Inc. case, the Court of Appeals for the Ninth Circuit observed:

"In the context of copyright law, vicarious liability extends beyond an employer/employee relationship to cases in which a defendant "has the right and ability to supervise the infringing activity and also has a direct financial interest in such activities."

== In the United States ==
In the United States of America, the doctrine of contributory infringement is based on the 1911 case of Kalem Co. v. Harper Bros. The ingredients of contributory infringement were laid down in the Second Circuit Court of Appeals decision in Gershwin Publishing Corp. v. Columbia Artists Management, Inc., in which the court said that contributory infringement is said to happen when someone, with knowledge of the infringing activity, induces, causes, or materially contributes to the infringing conduct of another. This doctrine was developed in the context of the 1909 Copyright Act which did not have any reference to contributory infringement. But, the 1976 Act recognised the exclusive right of a copyright owner 'to do and to authorize' the rights attached to a copyright enumerated in the Act. The words 'to authorize' were meant to bring contributory infringements within the purview of the Act. But, still, the Act did not specify the requirements of such forms of infringement and left its application to the discretion of courts.

=== Sony Betamax case ===
The case of Sony Corp. of America v. Universal City Studios, Inc., more commonly known as the Sony Betamax case, gave the United States Supreme Court its first opportunity to comprehensively look into and interpret the rules regarding secondary liability and contributory infringement in context of the 1976 Copyright statute. The primary issue in this case was whether a VCR manufacturing company could be held liable for copyright infringements done by its customers. The court held that secondary liability for copyright infringements was not a foreign concept to US Copyright law and it was well enshrined in the copyright law of the United States. In the court's own words:

Vicarious liability is imposed in virtually all areas of the law, and the concept of contributory infringement is merely a species of the broader problem of identifying the circumstances in which it is just to hold one individual accountable for the actions of another

But, in this case, the Court held that Sony did not have actual knowledge of the infringing activities of its customers. At the most it could be argued that Sony had constructive knowledge of the fact that "its customers may use that equipment to make unauthorised copies of copyrighted material." The court then relied on the "staple article of commerce" doctrine of patent law and applied it to copyrights. The 'staple article of commerce' defence is available under Patent law in the United States and it lays down that when an infringing article is capable of 'substantial non infringing uses', it would become a 'staple article of commerce' and therefore, not attract any liability for infringement.

Based on this reasoning, it was held

The sale of copying equipment, like the sale of other articles of commerce, does not constitute contributory infringement if the product is widely used for legitimate, unobjectionable purposes. Indeed, it need merely be capable of substantial noninfringing uses. The question is thus whether the Betamax is capable of commercially significant noninfringing uses.

Since the Betamax was capable of "significant noninfringing uses", Sony was not held liable for contributory infringement.

=== Contributory infringement in P2P services ===
Contributory infringement has been the central issue in the cases involving peer-to-peer services such as Napster, Aimster, Grokster, and Morpheus. The courts have applied the Sony Betamax ratio differently in all these cases. For instance, Napster was held liable for contributory infringement. But, a similar service like Grokster was not held liable for contributory infringement as in this case, a district court, grounding its reasoning on the Sony Betamax decision, held that secondary liability could not be applied to peer-to-peer services.

==== A&M Records v. Napster ====
Napster was the first peer-to-peer service to be subject to copyright infringement litigation. In the Napster case, the issue was regarding the infringement of copyrights through the 'Music Share' software of Napster. Whenever this software was used on a computer system, it would collect information about the MP3 files stored on the computer and send it to Napster servers. Based on this information, the Napster created a centralized index of files available for download on the Napster network. When someone wanted to download that file, the Music Share software would use the Napster index to locate the user who already had that file on their system and then connect the two users directly to facilitate the download of the MP3 file, without routing the file through Napster's servers.

The Ninth Circuit Court of Appeals found Napster liable for both "contributory infringement" and "vicarious infringement". Regarding the issue of contributory infringement, the court held that Napster had "actual knowledge" of infringing activity, and providing its software and services to the infringers meant that it had "materially contributed" to the infringement. It was held that the defense in Sony was of "limited assistance to Napster". The test whether a technology is capable of substantial non infringing uses was relevant only for imputing knowledge of infringement to the technology provider. But, in Napster's case, it was found that Napster had "actual, specific knowledge of direct infringement", and therefore, the Sony test would not be applicable.

==== In Re Aimster ====
In 'In re Aimster', the Seventh Circuit was called upon to decide the liability of peer-to-peer sharing of music files through the Instant Messaging services provided by Aimster. Aimster had argued that the transmission of files between its users was encrypted and because of that, Aimster could not possibly know the nature of files being transmitted using its services. But, the Seventh circuit Court of Appeals affirmed the decision of the district court which had issued a preliminary injunction against Aimster. It was found that Aimster had knowledge of the infringing activity. Its tutorial showed examples of copyrighted music files being shared. Also, the 'Club Aimster' service provided a list of 40 most popular songs made available on the service. It was also held that the encrypted nature of the transmission was not a valid defence as it was merely a means to avoid liability by purposefully remaining ignorant. It was held that 'willful blindness is knowledge, in copyright law.." The Sony defence raised by Aimster was also rejected because of the inability of Aimster to bring on record any evidence to show that its service could be used for non infringing uses. Lastly, Aimster could also not get benefit of DMCA 'safe harbor' provisions because it had not done anything to comply with the requirements of Section 512. Instead, it encouraged infringement.

==== MGM Studios v. Grokster ====
The District Court for the Central District of California, in MGM Studios, Inc. v. Grokster, Ltd., held that the peer-to-peer services Morpheus and Grokster were not liable for copyright infringements carried out by their users. Unlike Napster, these services did not maintain a centralised index. Instead, they created ad hoc indices known as supernodes on the users computers. Sometimes, the software operated without creating any index at all. Thus, it was held that Grokster and Morpheus had no way of controlling the behaviour of their users once their software had been sold, just like Sony did with Betamax. It was found that the defendants did have knowledge of infringement because of the legal notices sent to them. But, it was also held that to attract liability under contributory infringement, there should be knowledge of a specific infringement at the precise moment when it would be possible for the defendant to limit such infringement. Also, it was found that there was no material contribution. For this, the court relied on Sony and compared the technology to that of a VCR or a photocopier to hold that the technology was capable of both infringing as well as non infringing uses. Grokster differs from Sony, as it looks at the intent of the defendant rather than just the design of the system. As per Grokster, a plaintiff must show that the defendant actually induced the infringement. The test was reformulated as "one who distributes a device with the object of promoting its use to infringe copyright, as shown by clear expression or other affirmative steps taken to foster infringement, is liable for the resulting acts of infringement by third parties."

=== Digital Millennium Copyright Act ===
The Digital Millennium Copyright Act's Title II, known as the Online Copyright Infringement Liability Limitation Act, provides a safe harbor for online service providers and internet service providers against secondary liability for copyright infringements provided that certain requirements are met. Most importantly, the service provider must expeditiously take down or limit access to infringing material on its network if it receives a notification of an infringement.

=== Communications Decency Act ===
Immunity under the Communications Decency Act does not apply to copyright infringement as a cause of action.

=== Inducing Infringements of Copyright Bill ===
The Inducing Infringement of Copyrights Act, or the INDUCE Act, was a 2004 proposal in the United States Senate which meant to insert a new subsection '(g)' to the existing Section 501 of the Copyright Act which defines 'infringement'. The proposed amendment would provide that whoever intentionally induces a violation of subsection (a) would be liable as an infringer. The term 'intentionally induces' has been defined in the bill as:

"intentionally aids, abets, induces, or procures, and intent may be shown by acts from which a reasonable person would find intent to induce infringement based upon all relevant information about such acts then reasonably available to the actor, including whether the activity relies on infringement for its commercial viability."

== In the European Union ==
In the European Union, the European Court of Justice has issued several rulings on related matters, mainly based on the Copyright and Information Society Directive 2001 and Electronic Commerce Directive 2000 and focused on what constitutes an act of "communication to the public" or of "making available".

== In India ==
Section 51 of the Copyright Act, 1957 deals with copyright infringement in India. Section 51(a)(i) provides for when an infringement of copyright is deemed to have taken place. It states that when somebody does anything, the exclusive right to which is conferred on a copyright owner, without first securing a license to do so from the copyright owner or in contravention of a license, the copyright shall be deemed to have been infringed. The basis for contributory infringement under Indian copyright law can be found in Section 51(a)(ii) which states that when someone 'permits for profit any place to be used for the communication of the work to the public where such communication constitutes an infringement of the copyright in the work, unless he was not aware and had no reasonable ground for believing that such communication to the public would be an infringement of copyright', then also, the copyright shall be deemed to have been infringed. Secondary infringement itself can be subdivided into two categories- activities that assist primary infringements, and activities that accentuate the effects of the primary infringement. Section 51(a)(ii) deals with cases in which somebody assist the primary infringement. Section 51(a)(ii) itself gives the defense which can be taken by a defendant to avoid liability under this provision, i.e., the defendant was not aware or had no reasonable ground for believing that the communication to the public would be an infringement of the copyright. Section 51(b) deals with situations in which the effects of an already existing primary infringement are accentuated by the actions of the defendant. Section 51(b) provides that a copyright infringement will also be deemed to have taken place if a person sells, distributes, imports or exhibits in public by way of trade an infringing copy of a copyright-protected work. Therefore, Section 51(a)(ii) and Section 51(b) are the statutory basis for secondary liability in India including contributory infringement.

=== Information Technology Act, 2000 ===
The Information Technology Act, 2000 ("IT Act") contains specific provisions dealing with liabilities of Internet service providers. These provisions provide for 'safe harbors' for Internet Service Providers. Section 2(w) of the IT Act defines an 'intermediary' as 'intermediary with respect to any particular electronic message means any person who on behalf of another person receives, stores or transmits that message or provides any service with respect to that message'. Due to this wide definition, almost every entity, including ISPs, search engines and online service providers can get the benefit of the safe harbor provisions in the IT Act. Section 79 of the IT Act provides that an intermediary shall not be liable for any third-party information, data, or communication link made available or hosted by the intermediary. But, an intermediary will get the benefit of the safe harbor provisions only if it satisfies certain conditions. The intermediaries function should be limited to providing access to a communication system, the intermediary should not initiate the transmission, select the receiver or modify the transmission and should observe the guidelines formulated by the Central Government in this regard. The 'IT (Intermediary guidelines) Rules 2011' have been formulated to specify the conditions that an intermediary must satisfy to get the protection of safe harbor provisions. As per these guidelines, the intermediary must observe due diligence measures specified under Rule 3 of the guidelines. For instance, the intermediary should take down any infringing material on its network within thirty-six hours of the infringement being brought to its notice.

==== My Space Inc. vs Super Cassettes Industries Ltd. ====
In December, 2016, the Delhi High Court reversed the judgment passed by a single judge bench earlier to hold that unless 'actual knowledge' was proved, an intermediary could not be held liable for contributory copyright infringement. In 2008, T-Series (Super Cassettes) had instituted a copyright infringement suit against MySpace for hosting infringing material in which Super Cassettes was the copyright owner, without first obtaining a license. The infringing material primarily consisted of sound recordings. It was alleged that MySpace was commercially exploiting the works of T Series by including advertisements with the works made available by it. The Single Judge had held that MySpace was guilty of copyright infringement under Section 51 of the Copyright Act and the benefit of safe harbor provisions under Section 79 of the IT Act were not available to it in light of Section 81 of the IT Act. The judgment of the single judge was reversed on the following grounds-

- No Actual Knowledge

Liability under Section 51(a)(ii) can be avoided by the defendant if they are able to show that they did not have any knowledge of the infringing act or that they did not have any reason to believe that the communication would amount to an infringement. Super Cassettes had argued that 'place' under Section 51(a)(ii) includes a virtual space similar to the one provided by MySpace. It was argued that MySpace had knowledge of the infringement based on the fact that it had incorporated safeguard tools to weed out infringing material and that it invited users to upload and share content. Therefore, it was argued that there was implied knowledge. The Court held that to qualify as knowledge there should be awareness in the form of "actual knowledge" as opposed to just general awareness. Without specific knowledge of infringements, the intermediary could not be said to have reason to believe that it was carrying infringing material. Therefore, there was a duty on the plaintiff to first identify specific infringing material before knowledge could be imputed to the defendant.

- Safe Harbor under Section 79 of IT Act

Section 79 of the IT Act provides safe harbor to intermediaries provided certain conditions are met by them. But, Section 81 of the IT Act also states that nothing in the IT Act shall restrict the rights of any person under the Copyright Act, 1957. The single judge had interpreted Section 81 to mean that safe harbor under IT Act is not applicable in cases of Copyright Infringement. The Court reversed this and held that Section 79 starts with a non obstante clause and precludes the application of any other law including Copyright law. Thus, any restriction on safe harbor provisions such as Section 81 can be read-only within the limits of Section 79. Also, the IT Act and the Copyright Act should be construed harmoniously given their complementary nature. Further, MySpace's role was limited to providing access to a communication system. It only modified the format and not the content and even this was an automated process. Therefore, there was no material contribution also. To amount to an infringement under Section 51 of the Copyright Act, the authorization to do something which was part of an owner's exclusive rights requires more than merely providing the means or place for communication. To be held liable for being an infringer on the grounds of authorization, it was necessary to show active participation or inducement. Therefore, Section 79 is available in cases of copyright infringement also provided the conditions under the Act and Intermediary Guidelines, 2011 are fulfilled. Since MySpace had fulfilled these requirements, it was given the protection of Section 79 of IT Act.

== See also ==
- Copyright Act of 1976 (US)
- Copyright law of India
- Copyright law of the United States
- Digital Millennium Copyright Act (DMCA) (US)
- Information Technology Act, 2000
- Secondary liability
