= Grokster =

Software company

Grokster Ltd. was a privately owned software company based in Nevis, West Indies that created the Grokster peer-to-peer file-sharing client in 2001 that used the FastTrack protocol. Grokster Ltd. was rendered extinct in late 2005 by the United States Supreme Court's decision in MGM Studios, Inc. v. Grokster, Ltd. The court ruled against Grokster's peer-to-peer file sharing program for computers running the Microsoft Windows operating system, effectively forcing the company to cease operations.

The product was similar in look and feel to Kazaa, marketed by Sharman Networks, and Morpheus, which was distributed by StreamCast. Grokster, along with Morpheus and Kazaa, are considered second-generation peer-to-peer file sharing programs. Unlike their predecessor Napster, these file sharing programs allowed users to trade files directly between one another, without these transactions passing through a centralized server. Because Napster maintained this fraction of control over the transaction of files through its server, it was ruled illegal because it should have exercised its power over the server to stop the sharing of copyright infringing files. Grokster and this second generation of peer-to-peer file sharing programs sought to avoid this legal obstacle.

== Summary of the piracy argument ==
It has been estimated that 90% of files shared on Grokster were downloaded illegally. Whether such downloads have substantially affected the retail sales of music, videos, and other works protected by copyright and the intellectual property laws is a matter of debate. Grokster claimed they did not violate any copyright laws because no files passed through their computers. They assigned certain user computers as "root supernodes" that acted as music hubs for their company. Thus they were not responsible for controlling any specific file downloads.

The key issue in the copyright infringement case was the so-called "Sony safe-harbor" principle that was set by the Supreme Court over 21 years previously in Sony v. Universal Studios 464 U.S. 417 (1984). The ruling stated that, "...the sale of copying equipment, like the sale of other articles of commerce, does not constitute contributory infringement if the product is widely used for legitimate, unobjectionable purposes. Indeed, it need merely be capable of substantial non-infringing uses" (Sony 464 U.S. at 442). This case challenged the legality of using VTRs to copy content using Betamax tapes. Grokster argued that proof of reasonable, actual or potential, non-infringing use, is sufficient to fulfill the "substantiality" requirement. The RIAA and MPAA argued that Sony safe-harbor requires proof that the non-infringing use is the primary one; an incidental non-infringing use is not enough.

Among the amicus curiae briefs:

- The U.S. government proposed that a manufacturer of a technological device will be protected by Sony safe-harbor only if the non-infringing uses are commercially significant compared to the infringing uses.
- A group of law and economic professors (among them Professors Kenneth J. Arrow, and William M. Landes) argue that the test whether the non-infringing use is substantial, requires an examination of all the existing legal mechanisms for accomplishing the same task. The example given is the distribution of the Bible. This is lawfully available through peer-to-peer file sharing software and is therefore a non-infringing use. But many religious websites offer a free copy. Thus, since downloading the Bible through peer-to-peer file sharing software is an addition to the list of well-established legitimate methods for obtaining a free Bible, the benefits of this addition are not substantial and the overall use of P2P software should not be considered a non-infringing use.
- The cost-benefit analysis, first introduced by Judge Posner from the 7th Circuit Court of Appeals in the Aimster case, holds that a manufacturer of technological device will enjoy the Sony safe-harbor only if "...it would have been disproportionately costly for him to eliminate or at least reduce substantially the infringing uses."
- The Creative Commons organization presented a strong argument for non-infringing use in the form of the Creative Commons licence, despite the fact that the architecture of the software did not allow for the licence information to be transferred.
- Notable Emerging Technology Companies with the support of the Electronic Frontier Foundation (among them Kaleidescape, Inc. (CEO Michael Malcolm), Sling Media, Inc. (Founder Raghu Tarra), Time Trax Technologies Corp. (CEO Elliott Frutkin) argued unwarranted alteration of the test set forth in Sony Corp. v. Universal City Studios, 464 U.S. 417 (1984), that would have profound negative consequences for emerging technology companies. Determining a product’s "primary uses" necessarily requires evaluating how the product is actually used. This ex post facto, or after-the-fact, test for contributory infringement would greatly increase the legal uncertainty surrounding the decision to pursue commercialization of a new technology. Emerging technology companies cannot necessarily predict the "primary uses" to which their new technology will be put, much less whether those uses would be held by the courts to be infringing uses.

== History of the case in the U.S. courts ==
In April 2003, Los Angeles federal judge Stephen Wilson ruled in favor of Grokster and Streamcast (providers of Morpheus P2P software) against the Recording Industry Association of America and the Motion Picture Association of America and held that their file sharing software was not illegal.

On 20 August 2003, the decision was appealed by the RIAA and the MPAA.

On 17 August 2004, the United States Court of Appeals for the Ninth Circuit issued a partial ruling supporting Grokster, holding

This appeal presents the question of whether distributors of peer-to-peer file-sharing networking software may be held contributorily or vicariously liable for copyright infringements by users. Under the circumstances presented by this case, we conclude that the defendants are not liable for contributory and vicarious copyright infringement and affirm the district court's partial grant of summary judgment.

In December 2004, the Supreme Court agreed to hear the case. On 25 March 2005, billionaire and former Broadcast.com owner Mark Cuban announced he would finance Grokster's fight in the Supreme Court. Oral arguments were held for MGM v. Grokster on 29 March 2005, and in June 2005, the court unanimously held that Grokster could indeed be sued for infringement for their activities prior to the date of this judgment. But the future impact of the case may only be to require software companies to more carefully advertise their packages to discourage illegal downloading (see also inducement rule).

Grokster settled with plaintiffs shortly after the Supreme Court's decision. On 14 February 2006, the plaintiffs filed motions for summary judgment as to the liability of the remaining defendants, StreamCast and Sharman. Defendant Sharman Networks reached a tentative settlement agreement in August 2006.

On 27 September 2006, Judge Steven Wilson of the United States District Court for the Central District of California granted summary judgment to the plaintiffs as to StreamCast's liability. The court rejected StreamCast's argument that the plaintiff needs to show specific instances of infringement resulting from StreamCast's acts, holding that "Plaintiff need prove only that StreamCast distributed the product with the intent to encourage infringement."

== Supreme Court decision leads to shutdown ==
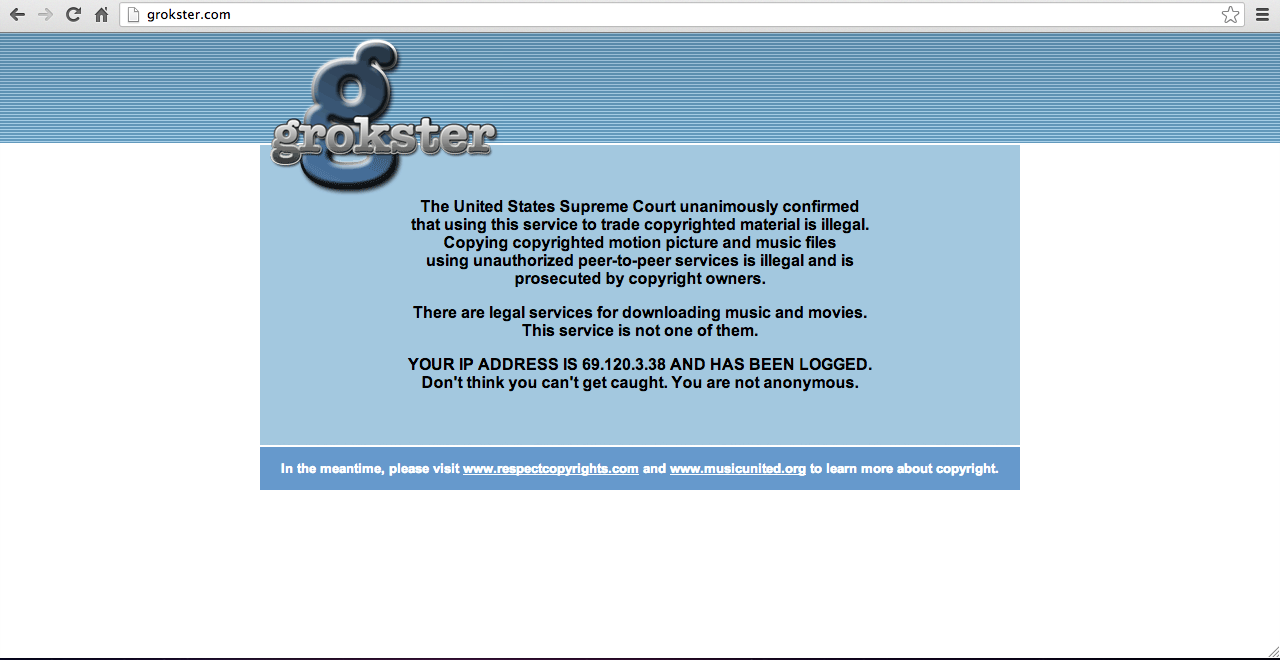
Screenshot of the Grokster website following its shutdown

Grokster closed its site on November 7, 2005. A note on its home page cited a United States Supreme Court ruling that copying copyrighted material using "unauthorized peer-to-peer services is illegal" and while legal download services exist, "this service is not one of them."

The website is now threatening visitors that their actions can get them caught, displaying the visitor's IP address.

The screen text reads as follows:

The United States Supreme Court unanimously confirmed that using this service to trade copyrighted material is illegal. Copying copyrighted motion picture and music files using unauthorized peer-to-peer services is illegal and is prosecuted by copyright owners.

There are legal services for downloading music and movies. This service is not one of them.

YOUR IP ADDRESS IS XXX.XXX.XXX.XXX AND HAS BEEN LOGGED. Don't think you can't get caught. You are not anonymous.

— Grokster site

== Impact of legal threats and fallout from Grokster’s demise ==
In the aftermath of the Grokster warning, many users became alarmed that their IP addresses were being stored. Prosecution of such individuals relies upon what has commonly been referred to as a process of doe subpoena in which prosecutors are required to gain a series of subpoenas in order to find out the identity of the user behind the IP address in question. Following the shutdown of Grokster, blogs became inundated with concerned users fearful of the warning; however, there have been no reports of the use of doe subpoenas in this case.

Research into the effects of warnings such as the one left on Grokster’s website has shown that while these warnings can result in a substantial reduction in online file sharing of individuals, the overall availability of downloadable content did not diminish. Furthermore, researchers cannot account for how much of this reduction in individual file sharing is simply shifted to other file sharing programs. In cases where the RIAA has issued threats, the users who conduct the most file sharing usually reduced their daily transactions to levels below the level of prosecution. In effect, these warnings have only caused only a brief reduction in overall online file sharing.

== In popular culture ==
- Weird Al Yankovic mentions Grokster in "Don't Download This Song".

== See also ==
- Comparison of file sharing applications
