= National Comics Publications, Inc. v. Fawcett Publications, Inc. =

American legal case

National Comics Publications v. Fawcett Publications
- Court: United States Court of Appeals for the Second Circuit
- Full case name: National Comics Publications, Inc. v. Fawcett Publications, Inc., et al.
- Argued: May 4 1951
- Decided: August 30 1951
- Citation: 191 F.2d 594 (2d Cir. 1951)

Case history
- Prior history: Complaint dismissed, 93 F. Supp. 349 (S.D.N.Y. 1950).
- Subsequent history: Clarified, 198 F.2d 927 (2d Cir. 1952).

Holding
- An author does not forfeit his original copyright to a piece of intellectual property if his work is contracted to another who fails to properly copyright works which incorporate the original property. Fawcett Publications' Captain Marvel comic strips were proven to have plagiarized those of National Comics' Superman character.

Court membership
- Judges sitting: Circuit Judges Harrie B. Chase, Jerome Frank, Learned Hand

Case opinions
- Majority: Hand, joined by Chase, Frank

Laws applied
- Copyright Act of 1909

National Comics Publications v. Fawcett Publications, 191 F.2d 594 (2d Cir. 1951). was a decision by the United States Court of Appeals for the Second Circuit in a twelve-year legal battle between National Comics (also known as Detective Comics and DC Comics) and the Fawcett Comics division of Fawcett Publications, concerning Fawcett's Captain Marvel character being an infringement on the copyright of National's Superman comic book character. The litigation is notable as one of the longest-running legal battles in comic book publication history.

The suit resulted in Fawcett Publications shuttering the Fawcett Comics division and cancelling all of its superhero-related publications, including those featuring Captain Marvel and related characters. In the 1970s, National, rebranded as DC Comics, licensed the rights to Captain Marvel and revived the character. DC Comics then purchased the rights completely by 1991.

== History ==
=== Pre-trial ===
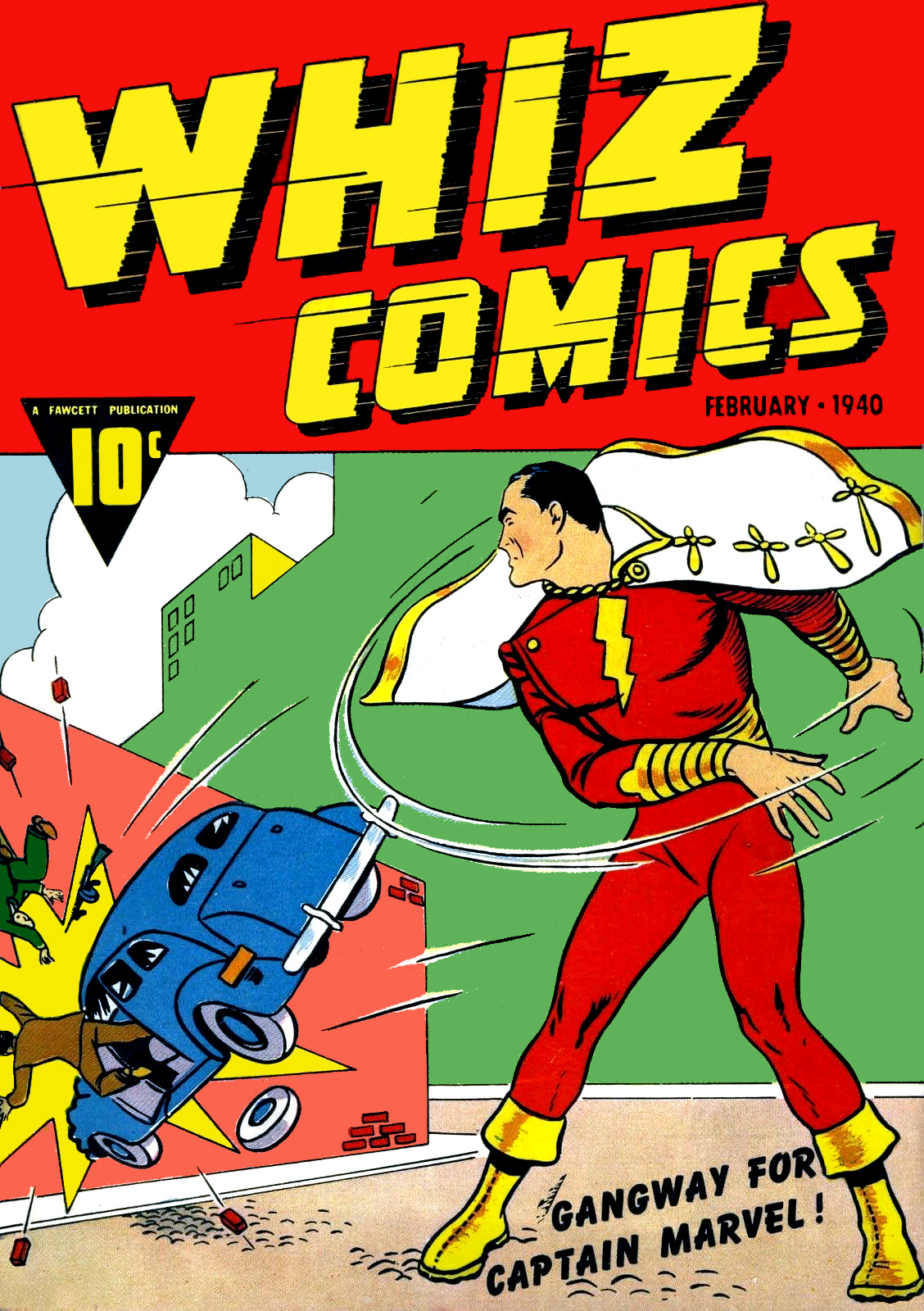
Whiz Comics #2 (February 1940), the first appearance of Captain Marvel. Cover art by C. C. Beck.

Captain Marvel was not the first superhero comic book character, or even the first Fawcett superhero character, to be the subject of a copyright infringement lawsuit. In 1939, Detective Comics and its rights-holding sister company Superman, Inc. had filed suit against Fox Feature Syndicate for their Superman-like hero Wonder Man, and filed against Fawcett the following year for their Master Man character. In the case of Master Man, Fawcett simply did as Fox Features had done: they ceased publication of the character and replaced his feature in their Master Comics periodical with a new strip (Bulletman).

However, Fawcett decided to fight Detective's allegations that Captain Marvel, the star character of their Whiz Comics periodical, was also an illegal copy of Superman. Captain Marvel had proven to be very successful for the company, and had, within two years of his existence, become its flagship comic book character and had been the first superhero to be adapted into film, in The Adventures of Captain Marvel. By the mid-1940s, Captain Marvel had become the most popular superhero in the country, his Captain Marvel Adventures was the nation's highest circulated comic book magazine (selling 1.4 million copies an issue), and Fawcett had created an entire family of spin-off characters: Captain Marvel, Jr., Mary Marvel, Uncle Marvel, and even Hoppy the Marvel Bunny. While its lawsuit against Fawcett was still pending, a few of the elements unique to the Captain Marvel strip found their way into Superman comics, including making Superman fly, Superman's arch-villain Lex Luthor a bald "mad scientist" like Captain Marvel's Dr. Sivana, and introducing the adventures of Superman as a teenager under the title Superboy, after Captain Marvel's teenaged sidekick Captain Marvel, Jr. proved to be popular.

=== Initial hearing ===
Detective Comics tried and failed to both have Fawcett cease publication of Captain Marvel comics and have Republic Pictures withhold release of the Captain Marvel serial via a cease and desist in June 1941. When the action went unheeded, Detective and Superman, Inc. filed suit against Fawcett in September 1941, naming Republic as a co-defendant. The lawsuit between Detective and Fawcett proceeded for seven years before trial finally began in March 1948. By this time, Detective Comics and Superman, Inc. had merged to create one company called National Comics, which became the sole plaintiff in the case.

National's argument was that Captain Marvel's main powers and characteristics (super-strength, super-speed, invulnerability, a skin-tight costume with a cape, and a news reporter alter ego) were derived directly from those of Superman. Fawcett's counterargument was that although the two characters were indeed similar, the similarity was not infringing.

National presented as evidence a binder over 150 pages in length, featuring panels from their comics of Superman performing superheroic stunts juxtaposed with panels of Captain Marvel doing the same stunts in magazines published at a later date than the Superman example. Fawcett countered in two ways: by providing examples of Captain Marvel performing those feats at even earlier points of publication, or by providing examples of other heroic comics characters such as Popeye or Tarzan performing those feats in earlier published comic strips. Testimony from Fawcett employees and artists hired by Fawcett on a freelance basis offered differing positions on whether or not the Fawcett creative teams had been required to copy from Superman comics.

The trial was decided in Fawcett's (Captain Marvel's) favor because of information Fawcett's lawyers had uncovered about Superman's copyright status. The defense lawyers provided evidence that National Comics and the McClure Syndicate failed to copyright several of their Superman newspaper comic strips, and the trial judge decided that National had abandoned its Superman copyright such that it was no longer valid.

The trial judge did find, however, that Captain Marvel was an illegal copy of National's Superman.

=== Appeal ===
National appealed the decision in 1951 to the United States Court of Appeals for the Second Circuit, with Judge Learned Hand presiding. Judge Hand's ruling in National's favor reversed a part of the trial court's decision. National's Superman copyright was held valid but the McClure strip was not under copyright, and the finding that Captain Marvel was an infringement of that copyright was affirmed. Judge Hand’s ruling focused on the similarities between the stories and elements used in Captain Marvel and Superman comics, rather than explicitly separating the character concept from the narrative similarities. The case was sent back to a lower court to determine whether specific elements, such as storylines and superpowered feats, constituted infringement.

Instead of trying to appeal the Second Circuit's decision to the Supreme Court or going through the damage assessment on how much of an infringement Captain Marvel was in district court, Fawcett decided to settle with National out of court. Superhero comics sales had decreased dramatically during the early 1950s, and Fawcett decided that it was not worthwhile to continue fighting National. National agreed to settle with Fawcett out of court, and Fawcett paid National $400,000 in damages and agreed to cease publication of all Captain Marvel-related comics.

=== Results of the lawsuit ===
Shazam! #1 (February 1973), published by DC Comics. On the cover (a memorable symbol of the lawsuit's resolution), Superman cheerfully introduces the character once considered to be derivative of him. Cover art by C. C. Beck, Nick Cardy, and Murphy Anderson.

Fawcett Comics ended up cancelling all of its superhero comics, selling the reprint rights for Hoppy the Marvel Bunny to Charlton Comics, who re-lettered the artwork to identify the strip as Hoppy the Magic Bunny. The entire creative staff of the comic book division was laid off, including noted comic book creators such as C. C. Beck and Otto Binder, and the comics division was shut down. L. Miller and Son, a small British publisher of black-and-white Captain Marvel reprints, adapted Captain Marvel into a derivative superhero, Marvelman, instead of folding their comic book business. This character enjoyed similar popularity in the 1950s and was revived in the 1980s, and itself became the subject of a copyright and trademark dispute after the publisher of its North American reprints ceased operations.

Captain Marvel remained out of print for the rest of the 1950s and the entirety of the 1960s, a period during which superhero comics regained their popularity. In 1967 Marvel Comics trademarked a character of the same name for use in Marvel Super-Heroes #12, and a follow-up self-titled series, which created some difficulties when DC licensed the rights to all of Fawcett's superheroes in 1972, and revived Captain Marvel in a periodical entitled Shazam!. They also obtained reprint rights to the original Fawcett comic books, and began running older stories in their various reprint titles as well as Shazam! itself. However, the license agreement required a per-use fee for every appearance by a Fawcett character, which limited DC's willingness to use the characters, and as a result most of them appeared very rarely once the Shazam! series ended in 1978.

In 1987, DC Comics relaunched Captain Marvel in a miniseries, Shazam!: The New Beginning, and purchased the full rights to all of the Fawcett superhero characters by 1991. Captain Marvel has not proven to be a modern-day success for DC to the degree it had been for Fawcett, due in part to DC not being able to properly promote the character under the "Captain Marvel" name, which is a Marvel Comics trademark. As a result, when DC Comics rebooted its entire comic line under the New 52 initiative in 2011, Captain Marvel was renamed "Shazam" and was reintroduced to comics the following year under that name.

National v. Fawcett is still an often-referenced case in the areas of copyright law and plagiarism because of its readily-accessible subject matter, and the popularity of its author, Judge Hand, among legal scholars. It was occasionally nicknamed Kent v. Batson, a reference to the two superheroes' respective secret identities: National's Clark Kent and Fawcett's Billy Batson.

== Superduperman vs. Captain Marbles ==
In Mad #4, 1953, the story "Superduperman" was published. While it did not specifically reference the lawsuit, the story recounts the battle between Superduperman and "Captain Marbles", which ends in the defeat of Captain Marbles.

== See also ==
- Kimble v. Marvel Entertainment, LLC: another comic-related intellectual property rights case (concerning Spider-Man)
- Detective Comics, Inc. v. Bruns Publications, Inc.: another comic-related intellectual property rights case (copyright infringement)
- Warner Bros. Inc. v. American Broadcasting Companies, Inc.
