= Secondary liability =

Secondary liability, or indirect infringement, arises when a party materially contributes to, facilitates, induces, or is otherwise responsible for directly infringing acts carried out by another party. The US has statutorily codified secondary liability rules for trademarks and patents, but for matters relating to copyright, this has solely been a product of case law developments. In other words, courts, rather than Congress, have been the primary developers of theories and policies concerning secondary liability.

== Early case law ==
Secondary liability in copyright has come about with case-by-case decisions. In other words, there has not been any real or consolidated theory. Furthermore, patent and copyright cases have tended to cross-cite each other. Examples of this are cases such as Kalem Co. v. Harper Brothers (the producer of the movie Ben Hur did not himself infringe, but was responsible for making and commercially distributing the infringing film), Shapiro, Bernstein and Co. v. H.L. Green Co. (a booth in a department store that sold infringing sound recordings and the store was ultimately held liable), and the so-called "dance hall" cases (the operator of an entertainment establishment was held liable because he had effective control of the premises and obtained a direct financial benefit derived from charging entrance fees to the public).

The Copyright Act of 1790 did not provide a formal definition of infringement, stating only that "any person or persons who shall print or publish any manuscript, without the consent and approbation of the author or proprietor thereof... shall be liable to suffer and pay to the said author or proprietor all damages occasioned by such injury." Furthermore, the Copyright Act of 1909 simply provided that any person who "shall infringe the copyright in any work protected under the copyright laws of the United States... shall be liable" for various remedies.

Despite the fact that the Copyright Act of 1909 did not explicitly establish liability for acts committed by a party different than the direct infringer, several cases decided under this Act set forth the guidelines under which a party may be deemed secondarily liable. Examples of the gradual recognition by courts of copyright liability extending to those who contribute to or vicariously profit from the infringing acts of others are Fishel v. Lueckel and Kalem Co. v. Harper Brothers.

== Types ==
There are generally two kinds of secondary liability developed by courts – vicarious liability and contributory liability. Although the line between these categories of liability is blurry, a precondition for all forms of secondary liability is the underlying act (or acts) of infringement. However, unlike contributory infringement, knowledge is not an element of vicarious liability.

Some academics have classified the active inducement adopted in MGM Studios, Inc. v. Grokster, Ltd. as a new type of secondary liability because it is based on express acts of inducement and not on a mere failure to act; furthermore, the specific intent to bring about infringing acts is another important factor in this analysis.

=== Vicarious liability ===
One of the theories widely accepted as a basis for liability in copyright infringement cases is vicarious liability. The concept of vicarious liability was developed in the Second Circuit as an extension of the common law doctrine of agency – respondeat superior (the responsibility of the superior for the acts of their subordinate). Pursuant to this doctrine, courts recognized that employers should be liable for the infringing acts of their employees under traditional master-servant principles. An example of this is M. Witmark & Sons v. Calloway.

Beyond the master-servant context, however, courts have extended liability to those who profit from infringing activity when an enterprise has the right and ability to prevent the infringement. Under Dreamland Ball Room v. Shapiro, Bernstein & Co.,

"[T]he owner of a dance hall at whose place copyrighted musical compositions are played in violation of the rights of the copyright holder is liable, if the playing be for the profit of the proprietor of the dance hall. And this is so even though the orchestra be employed under a contract that would ordinarily make it an independent contractor."

By contrast, courts did not extend liability to landlords who leased premises to a direct infringer for a fixed rental and did not participate directly in organizing or soliciting the infringing activity. For example, Deutsch v. Arnold, Fonovisa v. Cherry Auction (extending liability to the operator of a swap meet who repeatedly leased booth space to concessionaires selling infringing tapes).

The landmark case on vicarious liability for sales of counterfeit recordings is Shapiro, Bernstein and Co. v. H.L. Green Co. In Shapiro, the court was faced with a copyright infringement suit against the owner of a chain of department stores where a concessionaire was selling counterfeit recordings. The Shapiro court ultimately imposed liability, even though the defendant was unaware of the infringement, reasoning that the store proprietor had the power to cease the conduct of the concessionaire, and because the proprietor obtained direct financial benefit from the infringement.

=== Contributory liability ===
Contributory liability or contributory infringement has been widely defined as a form of liability on the part of someone who is not directly infringing but nevertheless is making contributions to the infringing acts of others. Material contributions to the act (or enabling thereof), as well as knowledge of the act itself, are key elements of contributory liability. Additionally, in the course of performing such material contributions, the parties know that they are materially infringing copyrighted content.

Contributory liability is rooted in the tort theory of enterprise liability. Contributory liability holds the third party liable for the primary act based on the third party's relationship with the actual harm – either by enabling or by benefiting from it. As the court stated in Gershwin Publ'g Corp. v. Columbia Artists Mgmt.: “ "one who, with knowledge of the infringing activity, induces, causes, or materially contributes ... may be held liable as a contributory infringer."

Not long after the passage of the 1976 Copyright Act, the scope of contributory infringement liability was tested in a case in which the copyright owners claimed that the sale of a recording device – the VCR – illegally contributed to infringement. In Sony Corp. of America v. Universal City Studios, Inc. was established a variant on contributory liability claims with respect to technologies. When Universal City Studios initially sued Sony for making and selling the Betamax, the theory was that Sony materially contributed to acts of infringement performed by users of the Betamax, and knew or had reason to know that the technology would be used for infringing purposes. The Supreme Court of the United States held that, even though material contributions and knowledge of the infringement are generally sufficient to establish secondary liability, in the case of infringing technology, contributory liability cannot be imposed unless the technology lacks substantial non-infringing uses. As the Court phrased the Sony exception with regard to new technologies: "The sale of copying equipment, like the sale of other articles of commerce, does not constitute contributory infringement if the product is widely used for legitimate, unobjectionable purposes. Indeed, it need merely be capable of substantial noninfringing uses."

== Liability of internet service providers (ISPs) ==
Regarding internet communications, sometimes the most promising remedy is only available from the standpoint of the internet intermediary (e.g. delete the post, take down the link). In fact, the internet is a special field for secondary liability, because the open architecture of the internet facilitates many communications and users need intermediaries in order to access and contact each other's services.

The question of whether Internet service providers (ISPs) should be held liable for the actions of network users is unresolved. As to copyright, however, ISPs remain liable, in all territories, as primary, direct infringers of copyright if, and only to the extent, that they are direct actors and make copies on behalf of their customers, so the issue of additional secondary liability is less significant in a case where direct liability is alleged. An ISP's direct liability arises from the ISP's own actions, not the actions of another party.

Recent statutes in the United States (Digital Millennium Copyright Act of 1998) and the European Union have provided significant, though not total, immunity from primary copyright liability that, in the absence of those statutes, would exist for ISPs.

The DMCA states four safe harbors: (a) Transitory network communications (b) System caching (c) Information storage and (d) Information location tools. The last three have so called “notice & take down” rules for specificity in notice of infringement, counter-notice and put-back and liability if false notice has been given.

In order to be eligible for the safe harbor provisions, it is required that the service provider has adopted and reasonably implemented a policy to terminate the accounts of repetitive infringers. In addition, ISPs must accommodate and not interfere with standard technical measures used by copyright owners to protect their works.

As to trademarks, in the absence of statutory guidance, courts have extended both types of secondary liability (vicarious and contributory) to third parties, including in some circumstances ISPs. Here, too, the question whether ISPs will be held liable for the acts of their infringing customers will depend on the degree of the ISP's knowledge and involvement in the specific infringing activity.

== In the future ==
Future treatment of secondary liability by US courts is uncertain. Some cases and commentators have argued for broadening secondary liability through cost–benefit analysis, multi-factor balancing tests, or simply basing it on technical designs or business models.

The proposed EU directive would make aiding and abetting infringement a basis for liability. In light of the above, it is permissible to conclude that there is no consensus on this issue.

== See also ==
- Hotfile – a case where both vicarious and contributory liability were considered
- In re Aimster Copyright Litigation
