= Contributory infringement =

Contributory infringement may refer to:

- Contributory patent infringement
- Contributory copyright infringement
