= Nutt v. National Institute Inc. =

American legal case

- Court: United States Court of Appeals for the Second Circuit
- Full case name: NUTT v. NATIONAL INSTITUTE INCORPORATED FOR THE IMPROVEMENT OF MEMORY
- Decided: 11 March 1929
- Citation: 31 F.2d 236

Court membership
- Judges sitting: MANTON, SWAN, and CHASE

Case opinions
- It is not the subject that is protected by copyright. It is the treatment of a subject that is protected.

Keywords
- copyright infringement

Nutt v. National Institute Inc. (2d Cir. 1929) was an early case in which it was found that copyright extended beyond the words of a work. The court found that "The infringement need not be a complete or exact copy. Paraphrasing or copying with evasion is an infringement, even though there may be little or no conceivable identity between the two."

== Background ==
Nutt had been a partner of the author of a series of lectures on "How to Improve Memory" until October 1922, when he branched out on his own. In October 1925 the author of the lectures was granted copyright for them. His filing said they had been developed and refined over the three-year period. He formed a company called the National Institute Incorporated for the Improvement of Memory, becoming president of the company and assigning his copyright in the lectures to the company in December 1927. In December 1927 Nutt delivered his version of the lectures. The National Institute filed a claim of copyright violation.

== Court findings ==
The district court found that copyright in the lectures had been infringed, and the United States Court of Appeals for the Second Circuit affirmed this finding. The appeal court quoted the finding in West Publishing Co. v. Edward Thompson Co that "the test is whether the one charged with the infringement has made an independent production, or made a substantial and unfair use of the complainant's work." It noted that an old plot can be copied with a new treatment, but if there were sufficient similarities between the prior work and the copy that would indicate piracy. In this case, the court found,

The appellant here, not only uses the underlying theme of the lectures, but treats the ideas and topics in the same way. He used identical associations and key words, and makes it inconceivable that he does so without copying appellee's copyrighted work. The works of both parties ... take about the same length of time for delivery, appeal to the same kind of audience, involve oral co-operation by members of the audience with the lecturer, and involve colloquies between them

The court dismissed a claim that the work had been placed in the public domain since the lectures had been delivered before the application was made for copyright, and pointed out that even if the audience had been allowed to make notes, they could still not publish or sell these notes without the author's permission. The court also dismissed a claim that the copyright in the lectures was invalid since they incorporated concepts from another set of lectures, finding that although some of the thoughts and ideas in the earlier set of lectures were present in the National Institute lectures, the expression was quite different, and it is the expression rather than the ideas that is subject to copyright.

The court found that "A comparison of the appellant's lectures with the copyrighted lectures shows similarity and copying of the association, presentation, and combination of the ideas and thought which go to make up the appellee's literary composition. Such appropriation and use of them is an unlawful infringement."

== Results ==
The finding has been cited in a number of later cases. Thus in Comptone Company v. Rayex Corporation (1957) and in Life Music, Inc. v. Broadcast Music, Inc. (1965) the courts quoted the Nutt opinion that the test for copyright infringement is "whether the one charged with the infringement has made an independent production, or made a substantial and unfair use of the complainant's work." The court quoted the finding in Salinger v. Random House when denying a petition for rehearing.
