= Warner Bros. Entertainment Inc. v. WTV Systems, Inc. =

US legal case

Warner Bros. Entertainment v. WTV Systems
- Court: United States District Court for the Central District of California
- Full case name: Warner Bros. Entertainment INC., et al. v. WTV Systems, Inc.
- Decided: August 1, 2011
- Citation: 824 F. Supp. 2d 1003 (2011)

Court membership
- Judge sitting: John F. Walter

Keywords
- copyright infringement, video on demand

Warner Bros. Entertainment v. WTV Systems is a 2011 copyright infringement case decided in United States District Court, C.D. California.

The defendants provided a service named Zediva which allowed customers to watch movies online by streaming the digital signal from physical DVD players housed in its data center. The court held that the defendants were transmitting and publicly performing the plaintiffs' copyrighted works, and thus granted plaintiffs' motion for preliminary injunction.

== Background ==
The plaintiffs, including Warner Bros., Columbia Pictures, Disney Enterprises, Paramount Pictures, Twentieth Century Fox Film Corporation, and Universal City Studios, were in the business of financing, producing, distributing, and publicly performing copyrighted motion pictures. The defendants, Zediva, self-described as a DVD "rental" service, served its customers with access to DVDs played from their data center where each DVD was streamed through its individual DVD player for up to four hours. Zediva customers did not have access to the digital file.

Zediva was not licensed or authorized by the plaintiffs to distribute or perform any of the copyrighted works. Zediva purchased DVDs and "rented" them out to users one-by-one. Under the first-sale doctrine, if the defendants' business is identical to a brick-and-mortar rental store, such post-purchase rentals do not require subsequent licenses from the copyright owners. Zediva claimed that once they bought the DVD they were "free" to rent it out or re-sell it. Zediva also argued that the system was "like playing back a movie from a DVD with a very long cable attached".

The plaintiffs alleged that "Zediva's business was built on streaming performances of motion pictures, not the rental of discs". Zediva's service was thought to have a significant negative impact on the market for other licensed VOD providers. The plaintiffs sought a preliminary injunction against Zediva.

== Opinion ==
The court looked at the following four factors of whether the preliminary injunction can be granted in favor of the plaintiffs:

1. likelihood of success on the merits.
2. likelihood that the moving party will suffer irreparable harm absent a preliminary injunction.
3. the balance of equities tips in the moving party's favor.
4. an injunction is in the public's interest.

=== Plaintiffs Have Demonstrated a Likelihood of Success on the Merits. ===
To establish the copyright infringement claim, plaintiffs must prove (1) ownership of a valid copyright, and (2) at least one exclusive right granted to copyright holders under 17 U.S.C. § 106 was infringed. The defendants did not dispute the validity of Plaintiffs' copyright.

Section 106 of the Copyright Act granted the owner of copyright "in the case of ... motion pictures and other audiovisual works, to perform the copyrighted work publicly".

Section 101 defines public performance of a work as:

(1) to perform or display it at a place open to the public or at any place where a substantial number of persons outside of a normal circle of a family and its social acquaintances is gathered; or
(2) to transmit or otherwise communicate a performance or display of the work to a place specified by clause (1) or to the public, by means of any device or process, whether the members of the public capable of receiving the performance or display receive it in the same place or in separate places and at the same time or at different times.

The court ruled that the defendants were "clearly transmitting performances of Plaintiffs' Copyrighted Works", and that the argument that the service was offering "DVD rentals" did not stand.

Furthermore, the court ruled that the defendants' transmissions were "to the public" for purposes of the transmission clause. Whether the place where Zediva's customers watched was public or not did not matter as much as the fact that the customers were "members of the public". "The non-public nature of the place of the performance has no bearing on whether or not those who enjoy the performance constitute 'the public' under the transmit clause", stated the court. It did not matter whether Zediva's customers were using the service at different times and in different places.

Accordingly, the court held that "Defendants [violated] Plaintiffs' exclusive right to publicly perform their Copyrighted Works by transmitting those Copyrighted Works to the public over the internet, without a license or Plaintiffs' permission, through the use of Defendants' Zediva service". The likelihood of success on the merits weighed in favor of the Plaintiffs. The court also refused to adopt the Second Circuit's volitional requirement in direct copyright infringement cases. For example, in Cartoon Network, LP v. CSC Holdings, Inc., the Second Circuit has held that a technology provider is not liable for direct copyright infringement if there is no volitional conduct.

=== Plaintiffs Have Demonstrated a Likelihood of Irreparable Injury. ===
The court held that the plaintiffs as copyright holders had the exclusive right to decide when, where, to whom, and for how much they could authorize transmission to the public, and the defendants interfered with such right. In addition, Defendants' service deprived Plaintiffs of revenue. Furthermore, the service threatened the development of a successful and lawful video on demand market, particularly on the Internet. Last, even though the plaintiffs required their licensees to provide a high quality movie-watching experience to the VOD customers, the defendants being non-licensed, were not obligated to meet such standards and provided sub-optimal customer experience that tarnished customers' perception of VOD as an attractive option for viewing the Copyrighted Works.

=== The Public Interest Supports the Issuance of a Preliminary Injunction. ===
The court held that the "public interest is served by issuance of a preliminary injunction" in order to uphold copyright protections.

== Impact ==
After the ruling, Zediva issued a statement calling the ruling "a setback for the hundreds of thousands of consumers looking for an alternative to Hollywood-controlled online movie services".

Techdirt editor Mike Masnick also criticized the decision, arguing that the fundamental question the court has considered was "whether or not the length of the cable matters in determining whether something is infringing or not".

Daniel Robinson, writing for the Harvard Journal of Law And Technology's blog, noted that the holding is "likely to increase the power that copyright owners will have over the growing market in video on demand". He further noted that the holding "eliminates a potential alternative to content distribution systems owned or controlled by studios [and] implies that the success of streaming videos depends on giving copyright owners greater control over the technology by which they are delivered".

The court did not directly address Zediva's first sale argument, but law professor James Grimmelmann pointed out that "first sale is a defense only to the distribution and display rights", irrelevant to the lawsuit based on the performance right.

== See also ==
- Warner Bros. Inc. v. American Broadcasting Companies, Inc.
- Wright v. Warner Books, Inc.
- Copyright Act of 1976
- Cartoon Network, LP v. CSC Holdings, Inc.
- Columbia Pictures Industries, Inc. v. Redd Horne, Inc.
