= Warner Bros. Inc. v. American Broadcasting Companies, Inc. =

American legal case

- Court: United States Court of Appeals for the Second Circuit
- Full case name: Warner Bros. Inc. v. American Broadcasting Companies, Inc.
- Argued: March 16, 1983
- Decided: October 6 1983
- Citations: 720 F.2d 231; 222 U.S.P.Q. 101; 1983 Copr. L. Dec. (CCH) ¶ 25,584

Case history
- Prior history: Preliminary injunction denied by District Court; affirmed on appeal at 654 F.2d 204; 211 U.S.P.Q. 97; 1981 Copr. L. Dec. (CCH) ¶ 25,284; 7 Media L. Rep. 1973 (2d. Cir. 1981)

Court membership
- Judges sitting: Walter Roe Mansfield, Thomas Joseph Meskill, Jon O. Newman

Case opinions
- Majority: Newman, joined by a unanimous court

Warner Bros. Inc. v. American Broadcasting Companies, Inc., 720 F.2d 231 (2d Cir. 1983), the case of Superman v. The Greatest American Hero, is the third case in a Second Circuit trilogy of 20th century copyright infringement cases in which the proprietors of Superman copyrights sued other companies for publishing fictional exploits of a cape-wearing superhero. Although the plaintiffs were successful in the first two cases, Superman v. Wonderman and Superman v. Captain Marvel, they were completely unsuccessful in Superman v. The Greatest American Hero. The court (in an opinion by Circuit Judge Newman) held that "as a matter of law . . . 'The Greatest American Hero' is not sufficiently similar to the fictional character Superman, the hero of comic books, television, and more recently films, so that claims of copyright infringement and unfair competition may be dismissed without consideration by a jury."

== Background ==
=== Facts giving rise to dispute ===
In January 1981, the American Broadcasting Company (ABC) issued press releases and began to run promotional spots for the TV premiere of The Greatest American Hero, which had been created and produced by Stephen J. Cannell Productions. The protagonist of the TV show was Ralph Hinkley, a young Los Angeles high school teacher whose physical attributes are not those of a superhero: he is of medium height, has a scrawny build, has blonde curls, and is clumsy.

Hinkley does have similarities, however, to Superman in that, for example, both superheroes: perform feats of miraculous strength; wear tight acrobatic costumes; do battle with villains; fly with their arms extended in front of them and cape billowing behind; are impervious to bullets; have X-ray type vision; have fantastic hearing and sight; fly gracefully in the night sky past a city's lit skyscrapers; lift a car with one hand; lead a double life; benefit mankind by fighting evil-doing villains.

But, in addition to Hinckley's scrawniness and clumsiness, he has other significant differences from Superman. For example: Hinkley derives his power exclusively from a magic suit that an alien gave him, but Superman's strength is a natural attribute of his extraterrestrial origin. Superman wears a blue leotard with red briefs, boots and cape, while Hinkley wears a red leotard, no boots, and a black cape. "Superman has mastered the art of self-propelled flight and accomplishes the feat with grace and verve. Ralph Hinkley, on the other hand, seems to be terrified when flying and each time, without fail, crash-lands. . . . As to the heroes' imperviousness to bullets, while the trait is shared, the expression of the concept differs dramatically. Ralph Hinkley cringes and cowers in the face of gunfire, whereas Superman boldly holds his ground when being fired upon." When flying, Hinckley (unlike Superman) is quite inept: in the pilot episode he "has difficulty steering, barely avoids colliding with a fire escape, and finally crashes into a brick wall, knocking himself out."

=== Proceedings in district court ===
Plaintiffs Warner Bros. Inc., Film Export, A.G., and DC Comics, Inc. sued defendants American Broadcasting Companies, Inc. Stephen J. Cannell Productions for copyright infringement and unfair competition, in the United States District Court for the Southern District of New York. Plaintiffs moved for "a preliminary injunction and temporary restraining order to enjoin the defendant, American Broadcasting Companies, Inc. (ABC), from (1) broadcasting certain promotional television spots relating to its series entitled 'The Greatest American Hero' (Hero); (2) broadcasting the premiere of Hero; and (3) broadcasting any episode of Hero prior to affording the plaintiffs an adequate opportunity to examine the work and to seek appropriate relief." District Judge Constance Baker Motley denied the motion. She found that Superman and The Greatest American Hero were not substantially similar, and that even if they were, the latter was a parody of Superman and therefore protected under the fair use doctrine. The district court also determined that it was unlikely that the public would be confused as to the origin of the later work. Plaintiffs then appealed to the Second Circuit, which affirmed the denial or preliminary relief. The court acknowledged similarities, but said they fell within the scenes a faire doctrine.

The case then returned to the district court. Judge Motley dismissed the claims on the merits by granting defendants' motion for summary judgment. Plaintiffs then appealed to the Second Circuit.

== Second Circuit ruling ==
The court began its analysis by noting "[T]he similarity to be assessed must concern the expression of ideas, not the ideas themselves." The court reviewed the similarities and dissimilarities of Superman and The Greatest American Hero. It found the two "profoundly different":

Superman looks and acts like a brave, proud hero, who has dedicated his life to combating the forces of evil. Hinkley looks and acts like a timid, reluctant hero, who accepts his missions grudgingly and prefers to get on with his normal life. Superman performs his superhuman feats with skill, verve, and dash, clearly the master of his own destiny. Hinkley is perplexed by the superhuman powers his costume confers and uses them in a bumbling, comical fashion. In the genre of superheroes, Hinkley follows Superman as, in the genre of detectives, Inspector Clouseau follows Sherlock Holmes. . . . The overall perception of the way Hinkley looks and acts marks him as a different, non-infringing character who simply has some of the superhuman traits popularized by the Superman character and now widely shared within the superhero genre.

The plaintiffs sought to (but were not allowed to) offer expert testimony that children would be confused because they would not notice the negative language in such phrases as Hinkley: "may be unable to leap tall buildings in a single bound," "may be slower than a speeding bullet," and "may be less powerful than a locomotive." The court dismissed such evidence as immaterial:

We do not doubt that some viewers may miss the point, but their misunderstanding does not establish infringement. Perhaps if [The Greatest American] Hero were a children's series, aired on Saturday mornings among the cartoon programs, we would have greater concern for the risk that lines intended to contrast Hinkley with Superman might be mistakenly understood to suggest that Hero was a Superman program. But when a work is presented to a general audience of evening television viewers, the possible misperception of some young viewers cannot prevent that audience from seeing a program that will readily be recognized by the "average lay observer" as poking fun at, rather than copying, a copyrighted work.

As for the unfair competition claims, so far as they relied on confusion, the court said, there was no misrepresentation and no likelihood of confusion as to source. As to "state law claims that rely on the misappropriation branch of unfair competition [they] are preempted." As to the "dilution" claim, "no reasonable jury could find that the . . . series or promos blurred or tarnished those marks."

The Second Circuit affirmed the district court's ruling on all points.

== Subsequent developments ==
The last episode of The Greatest American Hero aired in February 1983, approximately one month before the Second Circuit issued its affirmance of the dismissal of this case.

In an interview with TVparty after the TV show had been cancelled, the creator-producer Cannell was asked whether he "lost sleep over the lawsuit." He said he did because:

The show looked like it was going to be a hit and all of a sudden Warner Bros. comes in there and tells us that they own the entire super hero genre, that no one else could ever create another superhero with a cape. ...[T]hey believed they owned it and we won that suit and in fact redefined copyright law. That's a landmark suit.

== See also ==
- Warner Bros. Entertainment Inc. v. WTV Systems, Inc.
- Wright v. Warner Books, Inc.
