= Columbia Pictures Industries, Inc. v. Redd Horne, Inc. =

- Court: United States Court of Appeals for the Third Circuit
- Full case name: Columbia Pictures Industries, Inc. v. Redd Horne, Inc.
- Argued: August 14 1984
- Decided: November 23 1984
- Citation: 749 F.2d 154

Case history
- Procedural history: Affirmed holding from 568 F.Supp. 494 (W.D. Pa. 1983)

Holding
- The defendants' activities constituted an unauthorized public exhibition of the plaintiffs' copyrighted motion pictures, which is copyright infringement under §107 through § 118 of the Copyright Act.

Court membership
- Judges sitting: Ruggero J. Aldisert, Joseph F. Weis, Jr., Edward D. Re

Case opinions
- Majority: Edward D. Re

Laws applied
- Copyright Act of 1976

Columbia Pictures Industries, Inc. v. Redd Horne, Inc., 749 F.2d 154 (3rd Circuit, 1984) was a copyright infringement case of the United States Court of Appeals for the Third Circuit over the playing video cassettes in-store of a video sale and rental store. The appeals court affirmed the decision of the district court to grant the plaintiffs' motion for summary judgment and enjoin defendants from exhibiting plaintiffs' copyrighted motion pictures.

== Background ==
Maxwell's Video Showcase, Ltd. (Maxwell's) was a company that operated two video sale and rental stores in Erie, Pennsylvania. The stores had a small showroom area and showcase area. The showroom area contained video equipment and materials for sale or rental, but the showcase room, on the other hand, was used for patrons to view video contents in small booths with space for two to four people. The two stores had eighty-five booths in total. Customers who wanted to use the showcase facilities selected a film from a catalogue and the fee charged depended on the number of people in a viewing booth and the time of day. After they entered the booth, the motion picture of the selected film was transmitted to the viewing booth.

The defendants appealed from an injunctive order made by the United States District Court for the Western District of Pennsylvania to stop performing plaintiffs' copyrighted motion pictures. Also, they appealed from an award of damages against plaintiffs in the amount of $44,750.00.

The defendants obtained the video cassette copies for viewing legally. The sale or rental of these cassettes to individuals for home viewing was also not at issue. Columbia Pictures did not contend that in-home use infringes their copyright. It argued that the exhibition or showing of the video cassettes in private booths constituted an unauthorized public performance. In turn, this violated Columbia Pictures' exclusive rights under federal copyright laws.

== Opinion ==
Maxwell's legally obtained the video copies either from Columbia Pictures Industries or their authorized distributors. However, defendants were not licensed to exercise the right of distribution. The court concluded that playing a video cassette clearly resulted in a showing of a motion picture's images and in making the sounds accompanying it audible, which was what to perform a work meant. Thus, Maxwell's activities constituted an unlicensed performance of copyrighted works under section 101.

The court also concluded the performance was made in public, though the viewers were in their small booths in Maxwell's facilities. This was because performance made available by such transmission constituted a public performance, even if the recipients were not physically at the same place and in a private setting according to section 101.

The court found that Maxwell's viewings make up public performances according specifically to subsection (2) of public performance:

(2) to transmit or otherwise communicate a performance . . . of the work to a place specified by clause (1) or to the public, by means of any device or process, whether the members of the public capable of receiving the performance . . . receive it in the same place or in separate places and at the same time or at different times.

In addition, although Maxwell's had one copy of each copyrighted film, it has shown each of them repeatedly to viewers. Thus, this made the activity public under section 106.

=== The First Sale Doctrine ===
Among the most significant limits of the owner's rights is found in Section 109 of the 1976 Copyright Protection Act. The "first sale doctrine," basically establishes that when a copyright owner has transferred ownership of a particular copy, the person to whom the copy is transferred is permitted, without the consent of the copyright owner, to sell or otherwise dispose of the possession of that copy."

In this case, Maxwell's argued that the first sale doctrine protected their right to operate the viewing booths. That is, their activities didn't require the copyright owner's authority. However, the court regarded the defendants' "first sale" argument as merely another aspect of their main argument that their activities were not public. This was because Maxwell's always maintained the ownership of the videotapes and the fees paid by patrons were for showcasing operation, but not for the physical dominion over the tapes.

=== Liability of Co-Defendants ===
The court affirmed the holding made by the district court that Robert Zeny, Glenn W. Zeny, and Redd Horne, Inc,. were liable as co-infringers. This was mainly based on the holding that a person who had knowledge of the infringing activity and induced or contributed to the activity may be held liable as a 'contributory' infringer. (Note: See Gershwin Publishing Corp. v. Columbia Artists Management)

== Impact ==
There exist some critical viewpoints on the holding. David Mittleman argued that the existing framework on copyright infringement might discourage innovative applications on it so that it may contribute the copyright owner's monopoly. A later copyright case Warner Bros. Entertainment Inc. v. WTV Systems, Inc. drew on this opinion to determine that rental service Zediva's relationship with its customers constituted a public performance, effectively shutting down Zediva with a preliminary injunction.

At the time, additional concerns centered on the transmission of such material via videotape at public libraries. For example, author Jerome Miller writes that this case's decision was not popular amongst librarian professionals. He found that the results of the case forced librarians to make difficult choices. They could either terminate in-house showings or buy a license from groups such as the Motion Picture Licensing Corp. This offered new procedures for showing films within instructional settings.

At present, this case has received considerable attention within the motion picture industry and DVD streaming websites. It has been cited as justification to close certain movie streaming websites. During October 2011, Zediva took down their DVD streaming service and agreed to pay $1.8 million to the Motion Picture Association. Zediva argued that it serves a similar function as rental stores like Blockbuster who don't need a licensing agreement to rent movies. Zediva only rented DVD's to one customer at a time and did not make DVD copies. The Motion Picture Association contended that this type of streaming was illegal and in violation of copyright law. In August 2011, the U.S. District court Judge John Walter ordered a preliminary injunction against Zediva, shutting down their service. The Columbia Pictures v. Redd Horne ruling played a key role in this case.
