= Salinger v. Random House, Inc. =

American legal case

- Court: United States Court of Appeals for the Second Circuit
- Full case name: Jerome D. Salinger a/k/a J.D. Salinger v. Random House, Inc. and Ian Hamilton
- Argued: December 3, 1986
- Decided: January 29, 1987
- Citations: 811 F.2d 90; 87 A.L.R.Fed. 853; 55 USLW 2426; 1987 Copr. L. Dec. (CCH) ¶ 26,060; 1 U.S.P.Q.2d 1673; 13 Media L. Rep. 1954

Case history
- Appealed from: United States District Court for the Southern District of New York

Holding
- An author has a right to protect the expressive content of his unpublished writings for the term of his copyright, and that right prevails over a claim of fair use under "ordinary circumstances"

Court membership
- Judges sitting: Jon O. Newman, Roger Miner (Note: Judge Walter R. Mansfield also part of the appellate panel which heard the case, but he died before the decision was issued.)

Case opinions
- Majority: Newman, joined by Miner

Keywords
- copyright infringement, unpublished works

Salinger v. Random House, Inc., 811 F.2d 90 (2d Cir. 1987) is a United States case on the application of copyright law to unpublished works. In a case about author J. D. Salinger's unpublished letters, the Second Circuit held that the right of an author to control the way in which their work was first published took priority over the right of others to publish extracts or close paraphrases of the work under "fair use". In the case of unpublished letters, the decision was seen as favoring the individual's right to privacy over the public right to information. However, in response to concerns about the implications of this case on scholarship, Congress amended the Copyright Act in 1992 to explicitly allow for fair use in copying unpublished works, adding to 17 U.S.C. 107 the line, "The fact that a work is unpublished shall not itself bar a finding of fair use if such finding is made upon consideration of all the above factors."

== Background ==
J. D. Salinger (1919–2010) was an American author whose best-known work is The Catcher in the Rye, a novel that had taken him ten years to write and was published in 1951. A very private person, at the time the trial began he had spent the last thirty-four years living in the small community of Cornish, New Hampshire, with an unlisted telephone number and a post office box for his mail.

Ian Hamilton (1938–2001) was a respected British literary critic and biographer who decided to write a biography of Salinger. He was poetry and fiction editor of The Times Literary Supplement and had written a well-received biography of Robert Lowell, approved by the poet's family.

Hamilton asked Salinger to collaborate on the project but Salinger refused. Hamilton decided to proceed on his own. In his work, Hamilton made extensive use of letters Salinger had written to friends and others such as his neighbor, Judge Learned Hand, the novelist Ernest Hemingway, and his British publishers Hamish Hamilton and Roger Machell. The owners of these letters had donated them to the universities of Harvard, Princeton and Texas. Hamilton was able to read them after signing forms where he agreed not to publish them without consent. Hamilton said, "I regard these letters as a tremendous autobiographical source ... In my view, it would be totally inconsistent with the craft of biography to omit such materials."

Hamilton interviewed many people who knew or had known Salinger including Dorothy Olding, his agent. When Random House sent out the uncorrected proofs of the biography to reviewers, Olding got a copy and sent it to Salinger in May 1986. Salinger found from the May draft that his personal letters were held by the libraries, accessible to the public, and the book was quoting them extensively. Salinger formally registered his copyright in the letters and told his lawyer to object to publication of the book until all the contents taken from the unpublished letters had been removed. Hamilton made extensive revisions to his book, replacing many of the quotations from the letters (but not all) with paraphrased versions. Salinger did not accept that these changes were sufficient.

== District court findings ==
In October 1986 Salinger sued Hamilton and Random House, asking for damages and an injunction against publication of the book. He claimed copyright violation, breach of contract and unfair competition. The United States District Court for the Southern District of New York rejected all these claims. The court argued, citing Harper & Row v. Nation Enterprises (1985), that while the Supreme Court had "stressed the tailoring of fair use analysis to the particular case... It neither stated nor implied a categorical rule barring fair use of unpublished works." It went on:

Hamilton's use of Salinger's copyrighted material is minimal and insubstantial; it does not exploit or appropriate the literary value of Salinger's letters; it does not diminish the commercial value of Salinger's letters for future publication; it does not impair Salinger's control over first publication of his copyrighted letters or interfere with his exercise of control over his artistic reputation.

However, the court did note that in the May draft of the book Hamilton "was certainly giving himself a generous benefit of the doubt in concluding that the library agreement did not call for permissions." The claim of breach of contract was based on an alleged violation of the terms set out in the library forms used to obtain access to the letters. The unfair competition claim was based on cases where Hamilton had prefaced close paraphrases with words like "he writes" or "he states," which allegedly could mislead readers into thinking they were seeing Salinger's own words. The district court also rejected these claims. On the question of the library forms, the court considered that any restriction in the use contracts

... should be understood as applying only to quotations and excerpts that infringe copyright ... to read them as absolutely forbidding any quotation, no matter how limited or appropriate, would severely limit proper, lawful scholarly use and place an arbitrary power in the hands of the copyright owner going far beyond the protection provided by law.

However, the court did accept that Salinger had suffered a privacy invasion, against which copyright law gave no protection. Despite its findings, the district court issued a temporary restraining order pending an appeal.

== Appeals court findings ==
The United States Court of Appeals for the Second Circuit heard the appeal in January 1987 and reversed the district court's decision, barring Random House from publishing the book. The court noted that the Copyright Act of 1976 had preempted common law as it applied to copyright of unpublished works. Under the Act the copyright owner had the right of first publication and the literary property rights, the rights to the expressive content, although they did not own the facts or ideas contained in the work. The court found further that with an unpublished work the right to control publication normally insulated the work against "fair use" copying. The court then examined the defendant's "fair use" defense under the four standard criteria: purpose of use, nature of the copyrighted work, amount used and effect on the market for the work. It concluded that the weight was in favor of Salinger on all but the first.

The court considered that the purpose of using the letters fell within the categories of criticism, scholarship and research, all of which are considered fair uses. The court observed that a biographer may copy facts from an unpublished letter without risk but has no inherent right to copy the author's protected expression from such a letter, even as a means of illustrating the author's style. The court found that the fact of not being published was a critical element of the nature of the copyrighted work. It noted that the Supreme Court ruling on Harper & Row v. Nation Enterprises (1985) had observed "the scope of fair use is narrower with respect to unpublished works." The circuit court noted that this is ambiguous, meaning either there are fewer cases in which fair use may be found or that less material may be copied. However, the court decided it meant that unpublished works normally had complete protection against any copying of protected expression, which would be a form of first publication without the consent of the copyright owner.

The Second Circuit Appeals court disagreed with the district court about the amount and substantiality of the portion used, and found that paraphrasing had not reduced the amount of copying, which was extensive. The court quoted a 1929 decision that the protected expression was more than the literal words but also included the "association, presentation, and combination of the ideas and thought which go to make up the [author's] literary composition." It quoted a 1977 decision that, "What is protected is the manner of expression, the author's analysis or interpretation of events, the way he structures his material and marshals facts, his choice of words and the emphasis he gives to particular developments." Taking into account paraphrasing, the court noted that often more than ten lines of one letter had been copied in this way, and that about 40% of the book's pages included material from the letters. The court noted the fair use standard takes into account quality as well as quantity. Even short quotes may infringe copyright if they are what "makes the book worth reading." The court gave several examples of paraphrasing, including:

Context	Original letter	Paraphrase
Phrases used in describing an imaginary scene	like a dead rat ... grey and nude ... applauding madly	resembling a lifeless rodent ... ancient and unclothed ... claps her hands in appreciation
Comment on presidential candidate Wendell Willkie	He looks to me like a guy who makes his wife keep a scrapbook for him.	[Salinger] had fingered [Willkie] as the sort of fellow who makes his wife keep an album of his press cuttings.
Of an editor describing a story by Salinger as "competent handling," and rejecting it	Like saying, She's a beautiful girl, except for her face.	How would a girl feel if you told her she was stunning to look at but that facially there was something not quite right about her?
Parisians' view of Americans in Paris after liberation	[they would have said] "What a charming custom!" if "we had stood on top of the jeep and taken a leak."	...if "the conquerors had chosen to urinate from the roofs of their vehicles."

The last and perhaps most important aspect in evaluating fair use is the effect on the market for the copyright-protected work. The second circuit court of appeals considered the impact Hamilton's biography would have if Salinger later decided to publish his letters, which could have significant financial value. It found that the biography included, or paraphrased, almost all the most interesting parts of the letters. Hamilton's practice of including phrases like "Salinger says," or "he said" within his paraphrase could give readers of the biography the false impression that they had read Salinger's own words. They might therefore decide not to buy a collection of the original letters. The court found that this meant there would be a financial impact. Although Salinger had said he did not intend to publish the letters, the judge said that he could change his mind and that, "He is entitled to protect his opportunity to sell his letters." Given the strong balance in favor of Salinger, the court banned publication of the biography.

== Reactions and results ==
Salinger seemed to have created a per se rule under which unpublished copyright protected material could never be reproduced under the "fair use" principle, at least under "ordinary circumstances." Initial responses to the decision were mixed due to the difficulty of balancing the author's right to privacy against the public right to know. Brooks Thomas, a lawyer and the chairman of Harper & Row, said, "... I don't think the public's right to know what is in Salinger's letters is greater than the author's right to decide whether to publish them and when." Harriet F. Pilpel, co-chairman of the National Coalition Against Censorship, said, "I usually resolve that dilemma by saying, unless there is almost some life or death reason for suppressing something, I am in favor of letting it be known ... but the First Amendment includes a right to be silent as well as the right to talk or publish."

However, another editor said, "We are in the process of doing two biographies. This decision is crippling." The defendant's lawyer said "If you take this opinion to an extreme, what it says is that you cannot quote anything that has not been published before, and if you attempt to paraphrase, you are at serious peril. Copyright law was created to protect an author in a property right, not to permit an author to obliterate the past." In February 1987 Random House asked for the case to be reheard en banc, that is, by the full bench of sixteen appeals judges in the Second Circuit Court of Appeals. The court refused. In May 1987 Judges Jon O. Newman and Roger Miner reaffirmed the ruling they had made in January. In rejecting the petition for a rehearing, the court quoted the finding in Nutt v. National Institute Inc. (1929) that passages impermissibly took the expressive content of Salinger's letters by copying the author's "association, presentation, and combination of the ideas and thought which go to make up [his] literary composition."

In 1988 Judge Newman published an essay on "Copyright Law and the Protection of Privacy". He argued that with copyright cases involving unpublished material the court should be allowed to consider privacy issues, and that in cases where personal rights were involved the laws could possibly be extended to protect facts as well as expression. This was an extreme position that Newman later dropped. However, the essay illustrates that a judge may be tempted to use copyright law to support an objective other than simply protecting commercial rights. Hamilton did eventually publish a book, In Search of J.D. Salinger (1988), but it was mostly about the experiences of Hamilton himself in researching the biography, including his legal problems, rather than about Salinger himself.

In 1991 the Second Circuit Court of Appeal heard Wright v. Warner Books, where again there was alleged infringement of copyright from use of unpublished letters and an unpublished journal. In this case, the court found that the amount copied was insignificant, not enough to be protected by copyright law. In 1992 the Copyright Act was amended as a result of the Salinger case to include a sentence at the end of §107 saying that the fact that a work is unpublished "shall not itself bar a finding of fair use if such finding is made upon consideration" of all four fair-use factors.

== See also ==
- Wright v. Warner Books, Inc.: A lawsuit over first publication by the estate of Richard Wright
