= Wright v. Warner Books, Inc. =

American legal case

Wright v. Warner Books
- Court: United States Court of Appeals for the Second Circuit
- Full case name: Ellen Wright, Plaintiff-appellant, v. Warner Books, Inc. and Margaret Walker, Also Known as Margaret Walker Alexander, Defendants-appellees
- Argued: May 24, 1991
- Decided: November 21, 1991
- Citation: 953 F.2d 731

Case history
- Appealed from: United States District Court for the Southern District of New York

Court membership
- Judges sitting: Ellsworth Van Graafeiland; Thomas Meskill; Joseph M. McLaughlin

Case opinions
- Sparing use of creative expression from unpublished letters and journals may constitute fair use
- Decision by: Van Graafeiland
- Concurrence: McLaughlin

Keywords
- copyright infringement, unpublished works

Wright v. Warner Books (1991) was a case in which the widow of the author Richard Wright (1908–1960) claimed that his biographer, the poet and writer Margaret Walker (1915–1998), had infringed copyright by using content from some of Wright's unpublished letters and journals. The court took into account the recent ruling in Salinger v. Random House, Inc. (1987), which had found that a copyright owner had the right to control first publication, but found in favor of Walker after weighing all factors. The case had broad implications by allowing the use of library special collections for academic research.

== Background ==
Margaret Walker, who had been a friend of Richard Wright, decided to write his biography. In her first version she made extensive use of unpublished letters in her possession, letters to Wright's translator Margrit de Sablonière and an unpublished journal by Wright that had been sold to Yale University for $175,000 for use in scholarly research, as well as of Wright's published work. She also used Wright's unpublished manuscript "I Choose Exile", held by the Kent State University library.

In 1984 Walker's publisher at the time asked Wright's widow, Ellen Wright, for permission to use the material in which she held the copyright. Ellen Wright refused. Walker changed publishers twice, and revised the biography extensively to make much less use of the unpublished material, avoiding direct quotation wherever possible. Warner Books published this new version with the title Richard Wright Daemonic Genius in November 1988 despite objections from Ellen Wright. Ellen Wright brought a lawsuit in which she claimed copyright infringement and breach of contract.

== District court findings ==
The district court found that the weight was in favor of the defendant in all four fair use factors: purpose of use, nature of the work used, amount and substantiality of use, and effect on market value. The district court found the purpose of use was fair, and noted that Walker had paraphrased the unpublished works rather than quoting them, and the paraphrasing was simply factual reporting. Unlike the Salinger (1919–2010) case, there was no privacy issue since Wright was dead. The court said: "Walker has used the letters not to recreate Wright's creative expression, but simply to establish facts necessary to her biography, which often relies on her personal association with the late novelist." The court found that only small amounts had been used, Walker had not taken the core or heart of the work, and the market value of the copyrighted work would not be affected. The court therefore issued a summary judgment dismissing the request for an injunction against publication. The court dismissed the claim of breach of contract, and other claims were also dropped. Ellen Wright appealed the decision on her copyright claim, which was reduced to a claim of infringement of copyright in the unpublished letters from Wright to Walker and in the unpublished journal.

== Appeals court findings ==
The United States Court of Appeals for the Second Circuit affirmed the district court's judgment, although it disagreed with some points in detail. The court examined the disputed passages, and found that in most cases Walker had paraphrased short excerpts in such a way that Wright's creative expression was not copied, but that there were three paraphrased sections of the journals and four short quotations from the letters that would infringe copyright unless fair use applied. In this, the appeals court differed from the district court. The appeals court agreed with the district court that the purpose of use fell within the categories of "criticism", "scholarship" and "research", all of which are considered fair uses. The appeals court discussed whether the fact that the works were unpublished weighed against the defendant and found that they did, again disagreeing with the district court on the significance of the nature of the work. The court found that only a small portion of the work had been used, that the "heart of the work" had not been copied, and that there would be no negative effect on the market value of the unpublished letters or journal.

On three of the four factors the weight was in favor of Walker, but the fact that the works were unpublished was an obstacle. The court in Salinger v. Random House had found that unpublished works "normally enjoy complete protection against copying any protected expression". In this case the appeals court had found seven cases of infringement of protected expression. However, the court found that this was not an insuperable obstacle, saying: "These portions are short and insignificant, with the possible exception of a fifty-five word description of the art of writing. This use is de minimis and beyond the protection of the Copyright Act." On this basis the appeals court said the decision of the district court was correct. The court also found that the agreement between Walker and Yale University had not been violated, since she had not "published" the works but had made fair use of the works for scholarly purposes.

== Result ==
The decision in this case was welcome to libraries, which had been in doubt about their legal position in letting researchers use unpublished works. It affirmed that researchers could publish excerpts or paraphrases of such work as long as they conformed to fair use. Another finding from the case was noteworthy. Judge Meskill states that "Of the ten quoted sections, four bear Wright's stamp of creativity and meet the threshold test of copyright protection. The other six tersely convey mundane details of Wright's life and serve only to illustrate Dr. Walker's friendship with Wright." This could be interpreted as meaning that works that lack creativity or "authorship" may readily be copied under fair use.

== See also ==
- Paraphrasing of copyrighted material
- Warner Bros. Inc. v. American Broadcasting Companies, Inc.
- Warner Bros. Entertainment Inc. v. WTV Systems, Inc.

== Sources ==
- Meskill (November 21, 1991). "953 F.2d 731: Ellen Wright, Plaintiff-appellant, v. Warner Books, Inc. and Margaret Walker, Also Known Asmargaret Walker Alexander, Defendants-appellees". United States Court of Appeals, Second Circuit.
- Welch, C. Brigid (1993). "The Wright Cases". Unpublished Materials: Libraries and Fair Use. Association of Research Libr. UOM:39015029868364.
- Woodmansee, Martha; Jaszi, Peter (January 26, 1994). The Construction of Authorship: Textual Appropriation in Law and Literature. Duke University Press. ISBN 978-0-8223-1412-7.
