= The Dreamer (comics) =

1985 graphic novel by Will Eisner

The Dreamer is a 1985 thinly disguised autobiographical graphic novel by Will Eisner about his early years as a cartoonist for comic books in the 1930s, with a particular focus on his years as part of Eisner & Iger studios.

The book delves into the early years of the comic book industry and how the idealistic Eisner and his more pragmatic partner organized a business to supply material for publishers.

The incidents Eisner adapts for the story include how Jack Kirby frightened off a mobster who was attempting to intimidate his employer. A major plot point is how Eisner's principles and ideals sometimes complicated his business affairs such as the adaptation of the account of when he refused to perjure himself in court in a copyright infringement lawsuit over Wonder Man and thus cost his business a major account. (In reality, Eisner did testify on the stand that Wonder Man was an original creation.)

Eventually, Eisner decides to leave this successful life behind when he accepts the opportunity to produce a comic book for a newspaper syndicate, which resulted in the creation of The Spirit.

A later edition of the book contains a reference guide to the characters and their real world analogues.
