= Detective Comics, Inc. v. Bruns Publications, Inc. =

- Court: United States Court of Appeals for the Second Circuit
- Full case name: Detective Comics, Inc. v. Bruns Publications, Inc., et al
- Decided: April 29, 1940
- Citation: 111 F.2d 432

Court membership
- Judges sitting: Learned Hand, Augustus N. Hand, Harrie B. Chase

Case opinions
- Majority: Augustus N. Hand, joined by a unanimous court

Detective Comics, Inc. v. Bruns Publications, Inc., 111 F.2d 432 (2d Cir. 1940), the case of Superman v. Wonderman, is a 1940 decision of the Second Circuit in which the court held that the archetype of a comic book hero, in this case a cape-wearing benevolent-Hercules figure (Superman), is an idea, which the copyright in the comic strips does not protect against copying; only the specific details of the strips, their particular expression, enjoy legal protection. The author of the court's opinion was Judge Augustus N. Hand and the panel of Second Circuit judges included Judge Learned Hand.

== Background ==
The defendant Bruns Publications, Inc. published a comic strip magazine that featured an action hero called "Wonder Man". The plaintiff Detective Comics, Inc. published a comic strip magazine called "Action Comics" that featured Superman. Bruns published strips resembling Superman strips. The court described the strips in these terms:

Each publication portrays a man of miraculous strength and speed called "Superman" in "Action Comics" and "Wonderman" in the magazine of Bruns. The attributes and antics of "Superman" and "Wonderman" are closely similar. Each at times conceals his strength beneath ordinary clothing but after removing his cloak stands revealed in full panoply in a skintight acrobatic costume. The only real difference between them is that "Superman" wears a blue uniform and "Wonderman" a red one. Each is termed the champion of the oppressed. Each is shown running toward a full moon "off into the night", and each is shown crushing a gun in his powerful hands. "Superman" is pictured as stopping a bullet with his person and "Wonderman" as arresting and throwing back shells. Each is depicted as shot at by three men, yet as wholly impervious to the missiles that strike him. "Superman" is shown as leaping over a twenty story building, and "Wonderman" as leaping from building to building. "Superman" and "Wonderman" are each endowed with sufficient strength to rip open a steel door. Each is described as being the strongest man in the world and each as battling against "evil and injustice".

A side-by-side comparison of Detective's Superman and Bruns's Wonderman strips is provided in Superman v. Wonderman, along with corresponding passages from the preceding excerpt from the Second Circuit's opinion.

Detective prevailed in the district court, which found Bruns guilty of copyright infringement. Bruns appealed the judgment to the Second Circuit.

== Opinion of the Second Circuit ==
The court acknowledged the accuracy of Bruns's contention that the "various attributes of Superman find prototypes or analogues among the heroes of literature and mythology . . . a comic Hercules . . ." Nonetheless, to the extent that the Superman strips contained any expression, they were protected by copyright:

[I]f his production involves more than the presentation of a general type he may copyright it and say of it: "A poor thing but mine own". Perhaps the periodicals of the complainant are foolish rather than comic, but they embody an original arrangement of incidents and a pictorial and literary form which preclude the contention that Bruns was not copying the antics of Superman portrayed in Action Comics. We think it plain that the defendants have used more than general types and ideas and have appropriated the pictorial and literary details embodied in the complainant's copyrights.

The court then explained this holding in clarifying language that deprived Detective of much of its apparent victory:

So far as the pictorial representations and verbal descriptions of Superman are not a mere delineation of a benevolent Hercules, but embody an arrangement of incidents and literary expressions original with the author, they are proper subjects of copyright and susceptible of infringement because of the monopoly afforded by the act. . . {T]he complainant is not entitled to a monopoly of the mere character of a "Superman" who is a blessing to mankind. . . .

Accordingly, the court held, the district court's injunction against Bruns was too broad, because it swept up non-infringing conduct. Detective was entitled to relief only against cartoons "portraying any of the feats of strength or powers performed by Superman or closely imitating his costume or appearance in any feat whatever".

== Subsequent developments ==
After losing, Wonderman folded and publication ceased. The Wonderman decision became a precedent and influenced the outcomes in subsequent Superman infringement suits, such as Superman v. Captain Marvel.

== See also ==
- National Comics Publications, Inc. v. Fawcett Publications, Inc.
- Warner Bros. Inc. v. American Broadcasting Companies, Inc.
- Will Eisner, the writer/artist of the Wonderman comic, who testified at the trial (apparently untruthfully) that the Wonderman artistry was original and was not copied from Superman.
