= In re Aimster Copyright Litigation =

- Court: United States Court of Appeals for the Seventh Circuit
- Full case name: In re Aimster Copyright Litigation. Appeal of: John Deep, Defendant.
- Decided: June 30, 2003
- Citation: 334 F.3d 643 (7th Cir. 2003)

Court membership
- Judges sitting: Richard Posner, Kenneth Francis Ripple, Ann Claire Williams

Case opinions
- Majority: Posner, joined by a unanimous court

In re Aimster Copyright Litigation, 334 F.3d 643 (7th Cir. 2003), was a case in which the United States Court of Appeals for the Seventh Circuit addressed copyright infringement claims brought against Aimster, concluding that a preliminary injunction against the file-sharing service was appropriate because the copyright owners were likely to prevail on their claims of contributory infringement, and that the services could have non-infringing users was insufficient reason to reverse the district court's decision. The appellate court also noted that the defendant could have limited the quantity of the infringements if it had eliminated an encryption system feature, and if it had monitored the use of its systems. This made it so that the defense did not fall within the safe harbor of 17 U.S.C. § 512(i). and could not be used as an excuse to not know about the infringement. In addition, the court decided that the harm done to the plaintiff was irreparable and outweighed any harm to the defendant created by the injunction.

== Background ==
Recording industry owners of copyrights in musical performances brought contributory and vicarious infringement action, a type of secondary liability, against a website operator called Aimster, a company similar to Napster which facilitated the swapping of digital copies of songs over the internet.

Owners of copyrighted popular music claimed that John Deep ("Deep")'s Aimster Internet service was a contributory and vicarious infringer of these copyrights. The United States District Court for the Northern District of Illinois, Marvin E. Aspen, Jr., granted preliminary injunction for plaintiffs, which shut down Defendant's service until the suit was resolved, Aimster appealed from this preliminary injunction to the Court of Appeals for the Seventh Circuit.

The defendants argued that, unlike Napster, they designed their technology in such a way that they had no way of monitoring the content of swapped files. Someone who wanted to use Aimster's basic service for the first time to swap files had to download Aimster's software and then had to register on the system. After doing this he might designate any other registered user called a buddy, with whom he might communicate directly whenever both of them were online, and have the capability of interchanging music files. If the user did not designate any buddies, then all the users of the system became automatically his buddies to share files.

== Opinion ==
The court held that in this case the users of the systems were the direct infringers, these who are ignorant or more commonly disdainful of copyright and in any event discount the likelihood of being sued or prosecuted for copyright infringement, however companies such as Aimster that facilitate their infringement, even if they are not themselves direct infringers can be liable for copyright violations as contributory infringers.

The court analyzed that the copyrighted materials might sometimes be shared between users of such a system without the authorization of the holder of the copyright owner and, in this case, fair-use privilege will not make the Aimster a contributory infringer. As mentioned in the Sony Corp. of America v. Universal City Studios, Inc., also known as the Betamax case, the producer of a product which has substantial noninfringing uses is not a contributory infringer, merely because some of the uses actually made of the product are infringing. In that case, a video reproducer machine called Betamax, the predecessor of today's videocassette recorders was at the issue. The court explained about the sale of the Betamax that the ability of a service provider to prevent its customers from infringing is a factor to be considered in determining whether the provider is or not a contributory infringer. Aimster, however, was not able to produce any evidence that its service had ever been used for a noninfringing purpose, instead the facts showed that Aimster encouraged these infringing activities.

The court rejected Aimster's argument that to prevail the recording industry should prove that some actual loss of money has occurred because of the copying that Aimster service's contribute in producing. The court explained that although the court, in Betamax, emphasized that the plaintiffs had failed to show that they had sustained substantial harm from Sony's video recorder, it did so in the context of assessing the argument that time shifting of television programs was fair use rather than infringement. The court believed that Betamax was not hurting the copyright owners because it was enlarging the audience for their programs, as well as advertisements. However it was also clear that even though without proving economic loss, compensation for damages can not be awarded, plaintiff could still obtain statutory damages and an injunction.

The Court also rejected Aimster's argument that because the court said in Betamax that mere constructive knowledge of infringing uses is not enough for contributory infringement (464 U.S. at 439, 104 S.Ct. 774) and the encryption feature of Aimster's service prevented Deep from knowing what songs were being copied by the users of his system, Aimster lacked the knowledge of infringing uses that liability for contributory infringement requires. The opinion also makes it clear that a service provider that fits within the characteristics of a contributory infringer does not obtain any sort of immunity by using encryption, to avoid knowledge of the unlawful purposes for which the service is being used. Actually, a tutorial for the Aimster software showed as its only examples of file sharing the sharing of copyrighted works. In this sense the tutorial was nothing but an invitation to infringe this copyrighted music, same invitation that the Supreme Court found could not find in the Sony case.

Willful blindness is knowledge, in copyright law (where indeed it may be enough that the defendant should have known of the direct infringement, see Casella v. Morris), as it is in the law generally. Another example is Louis Vuitton S.A. v. Lee, 875 F.2d 584, 590 (7th Cir. 1989) (contributory trademark infringement). The doctrine of willful blindness is established in many criminal statutes, which require proof that a defendant acted knowingly or willfully. Courts have held that defendants cannot escape the reach of these statutes by deliberately shielding themselves, from clear evidence of critical facts that are strongly suggested by the circumstances, understanding that those who behave in such manner should be treated as those who had actual knowledge.

Lastly, the court established that the DMCA § 512 "safe harbors" were unavailable because Aimster had done nothing to comply reasonably with Section 512(i)'s requirement to establish a policy to terminate repeat infringers and instead even encouraged repeat infringement.

=== Opinion of the Judge ===
The opinion was written by Judge Richard Posner, known for his publications on law and economics, and followed closely on the heels of the Ninth Circuit's decision in A & M Records, Inc. v. Napster, Inc.

== Conclusion ==
The decision of the District Court was affirmed, concluding that a preliminary injunction against the file-sharing service was appropriate.

== Subsequent developments ==
Petition for writ of certiorari to the U.S. Court of Appeals for the First Circuit denied.

== See also ==
- Sony Corp. of America v. Universal City Studios, Inc.
- United States Court of Appeals for the Seventh Circuit
- Richard Posner
