= Gershwin Publishing Corp. v. Columbia Artists Management, Inc. =

Copyright infringement legal case

Gershwin Publishing Corporation, Columbia Artists Management Inc.
- Court: United States Court of Appeals for the Second Circuit
- Full case name: Gershwin Publishing Corp. v. Columbia Artists Management, Inc.
- Argued: April 19 1971
- Decided: May 24 1971
- Citations: 443 F.2d 1159; 14 A.L.R. Fed. 819; 170 U.S.P.Q. 182

Case history
- Prior history: 312 F. Supp. 581 (S.D.N.Y. 1970)

Holding
- The court established that defendant CAMI could not avoid paying license fees when music in plaintiff ASCAP's catalogue is performed at concerts, even when such events are sponsored by local organizations rather than directly by CAMI itself. Southern District of New York affirmed.

Court membership
- Judges sitting: Henry Friendly, Chief Judge, Robert P. Anderson, Circuit Judge, Levet, District Judge

Case opinions
- Majority: Judge Robert P. Anderson

Laws applied
- Copyright Act of 1909

Gershwin Publishing Corp. v. Columbia Artists Management, Inc., 443 F.2d 1159 (2d Cir. 1971), was a copyright infringement case in which the United States Court of Appeals for the Second Circuit ruled that defendant Columbia Artists Management, Inc. was liable for vicarious copyright infringement and contributory copyright infringement. Plaintiff American Society of Composers, Authors and Publishers ("ASCAP"), on behalf of Gershwin Publishing Corp., sued Columbia Artists Management, Inc. ("CAMI") on the premise that CAMI had no permission to use a song from its repertory for a public, for-profit concert in which artists managed by CAMI performed. The final court decision established that contributory infringement can still be liable for copyright infringement if the party has knowledge of the violating activity, whether or not they are directly involved in the violation.

== Background ==
On January 9, 1956, Todd Duncan and Camilla Williams, artists managed by CAMI, performed "Bess, You Is My Woman Now" at a public, for-profit concert in Port Washington, New York. The concert was sponsored by the Port Washington Community Concert Association. The song was performed without the artist nor the local association getting permission from Gershwin Publishing Corporation, who owned the copyright to the song.

Subsequently, ASCAP sued CAMI for allowing not paying license fees while gaining financial profit from the performance. ASCAP used this scenario as a test case to determine whether CAMI could continue to avoid paying license fees when music from ASCAP's catalogue is played at local community concerts.

=== CAMI's "Community Concert Associations" ===
CAMI has two main business enterprises. The first is managing artists. Secondly, CAMI has a local organization division, called the Community Concerts Division, whose main purpose is to organize and upkeep hundreds of nonprofit organizations ("Community Concert Associations") for the reason that some communities are too small to support professional managers and producers. Community Concert Associations sponsor annual concert series, totaling to approximately 3,000 concerts per year.

For its Community Concerts Division, CAMI sends one of its field representatives to meet with members of a community if it is seen as being able to support a local association. The representative helps the community form its own association by explaining CAMI's program, meeting with the officers of the local association, and reviewing the expected budget for the season. He also helps determine how the association will pay for the artists. In addition, the representative helps plan a one-week membership campaign, during which the association sells tickets for the concert season. CAMI also provides publicity material for the membership campaign as well as guidance on how to utilize them. These materials include press releases, proclamations by the mayor, editorials in the newspaper, and radio speeches delivered by well-known locals. The representative also helps keep record of the progress of the campaign in addition to personally delivering speeches on the radio at local clubs.

Despite the field representative's duties, CAMI's goal is to create the sense that the local association is the one in total control. CAMI's role in planning seems to diminish as representatives continue to teach local leaders how to organize these events, but CAMI still largely dominates much of the association's activities. Besides being heavily involved in the managing of the event, CAMI is also compensated for all of their efforts.

==== CAMI and Port Washington Community Concert Association ====
Much like their involvement in their "Community Concert Associations" division, CAMI played a role in organizing the 1964 Port Washington Association-sponsored concert. First, a field representative from CAMI launched an initial meeting to start planning for the concert season during which he estimated a budget, brought up potential musical talents, and helped plan the membership campaign week. The representative spent all of the membership campaign week in Port Washington and attended a "kick off" dinner for the campaign workers during which he instructed on how to sell tickets. Throughout the week, the representative also spent time at campaign headquarters, spoke to local civic clubs, gave advice on how to use promotional materials, and kept records on the campaign's progress. The representative also helped prepare a budget from all receipts and disbursements.

In general, there are two types of commission for community concerts. One is a differential that all artists pay CAMI for organizing and maintaining community concert associations. In addition, artists under contract pay CAMI a 15% management fee of their compensation after subtracting the differential. Artists not under contract with CAMI only pay the differential and not the management fee. There is more money available for the artists the more the membership campaign makes. Therefore, CAMI charges profitable concerts more for successful artists, which is beneficial for the artist and for CAMI, whose management fees increases. Following this process, Port Washington Association paid the artist's fees to CAMI after the concert. CAMI then deducted its commission from the fee and gave the remaining amount to the artist.

== Opposing Arguments ==
=== ASCAP/Gershwin Publishing Corp.'s Argument ===
ASCAP argued that CAMI had substantial knowledge of the artists' and community associations' copyright violation during the planning process between the field representative and the local association. Therefore, ASCAP deemed CAMI as liable for infringement of their music repertory by organizing, supervising and controlling the local community concert associations.

=== CAMI's Argument ===
CAMI admitted to the fact that music belonging to ASCAP was played publicly and for-profit at community concerts without permission. Moreover, they acknowledged this was a violation of the Copyright Act, 17 U.S.C.S. § 1(e), and that the Court had jurisdiction under 28 U.S.C. § 133. However, CAMI's main premise was that it was not responsible for such infringement. Instead, it argued that the performing artists and local associations should be held them. It claimed the artists were direct infringers since they violated the idea that only copyright holders can perform the work in public, and the local association became contributory infringers because they had sponsored the concert. Further, CAMI maintained that they purposely did not make an effort to obtain copyright clearance for the community concerts. CAMI did not feel these clearances were necessary because it did not claim any responsibility for infringement that might occur.

== Court Decision ==
A summary judgement was given on May 24, 1971, in which the court held that CAMI was a contributory infringer that was vicariously liable for its concert performers. Judge Henry Friendly served as the Chief Judge, Judge Robert P. Anderson served as Circuit Judge, and Judge Levet served as District Judge. The judges affirmed that CAMI was liable for copyright infringement because it had knowledge of the violation taking place and thus possessed the power to stop the infringement. Further, the Court established that CAMI could not avoid paying license fees when music in ASCAP's catalogue is performed at concerts, even when such events are sponsored by local organizations rather than directly by CAMI.

District Judge Anderson authored the final court's opinion. Based on the ways in which CAMI was involved in the copyright infringement, he stated that CAMI was liable for their involvement in planning and looking over the Port Washington Association's concert series. While CAMI did not have direct control over the artists it managed or over the local organization, the court deemed that the local association heavily depended on CAMI to produce the concert. Anderson additionally stated that CAMI had enough strength to stop their artists from copyright infringement and had a great part in creating and attracting the audience. In addition, CAMI took a significant financial profit from the copyright violation. By stating that CAMI's knowledge of the violation was enough to make CAMI liable, the court established an extension of the definition of contributory infringer.

== Influence on Subsequent Cases ==
Although Copyright Act, 17 U.S.C.S. § 1(e) does not explicitly state that only those directly involved in the infringement can be liable, it been assumed that parties indirectly involved in the infringement can still be held responsible for infringement. Therefore, the summary judgement for this case set the definition for cases involving secondary liability, for all works protected under the Copyright Act of 1909. The court established a piece of the definition of contributory liability, in that a party associated with the secondary infringer may still be held to copyright litigation if it has sufficient knowledge of or involvement in the infringing act.

=== Criticism ===
Professor Tim Wu argues that the court decision was and is not helpful for subsequent cases. He contends that because CAMI was plainly guilty, what the court established was too specific and not pertinent to cases in which the copyright infringer does not know full details or is not involved in the violation.

== See also ==
- Copyright Act of 1909
- List of copyright case law
- Columbia Pictures Industries, Inc. v. Redd Horne, Inc.
