= Wonder Man (Fox Publications) =

Comic book superhero

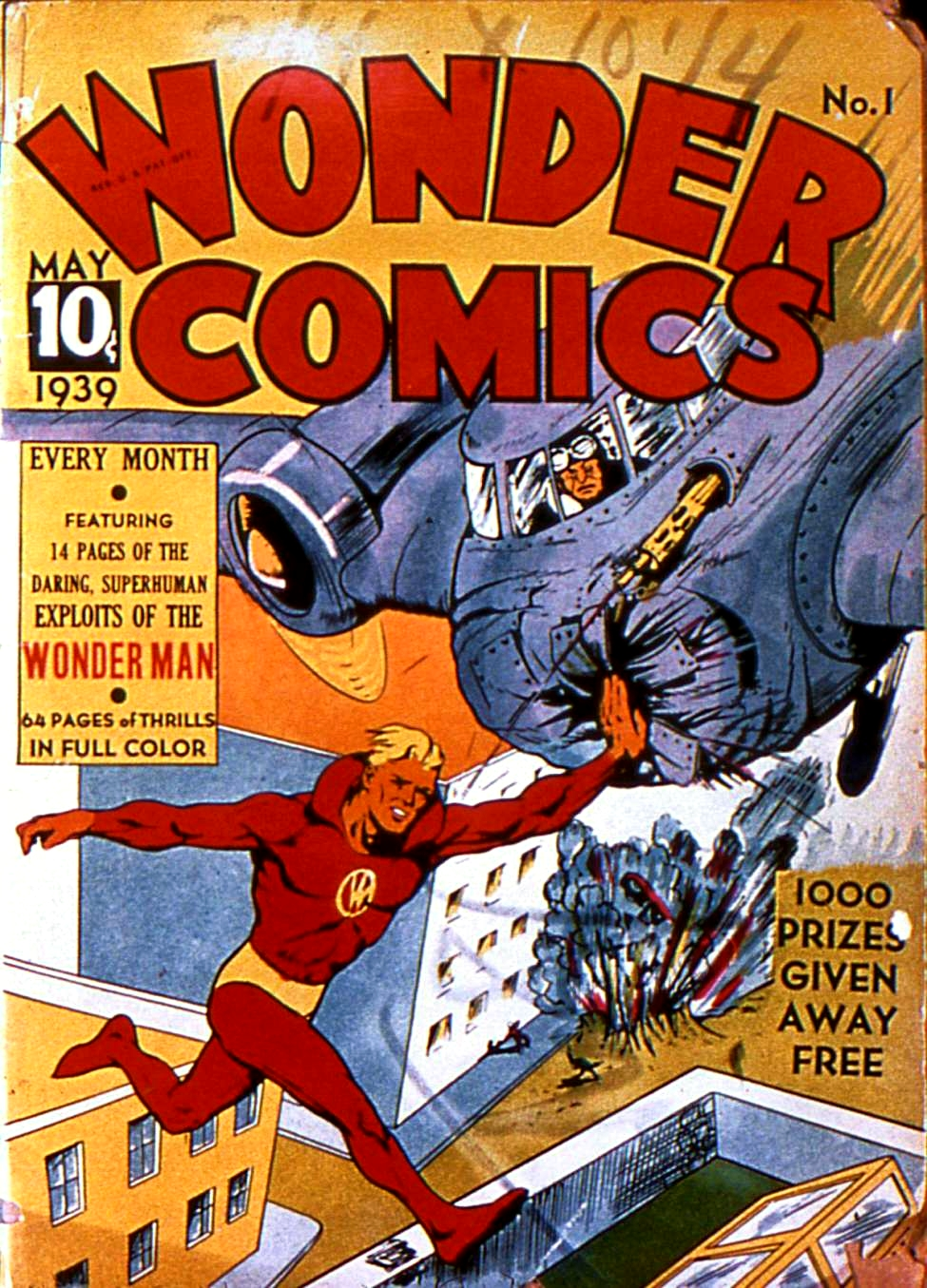
- Wonder Man's only appearance was in Wonder Comics #1.

Publication information
- Publisher: Fox Publications
- First appearance: Wonder Comics #1 (May 1939)
- Created by: Will Eisner

In-story information
- Alter ego: Fred Carson
- Abilities: Super-strength · Super-speed · Invulnerability

Wonder Man is a superhero created by American cartoonist Will Eisner, whose only appearance was in the comic book Wonder Comics #1 (May 1939). The character is of some historical significance due to a lawsuit that resulted from his only appearance.

== Fictional character history ==
Wonder Man's secret identity is Fred Carson, radio engineer for the International Broadcasting Corporation. During an excursion to Tibet, an old monk bestows Carson with a ring that gave him the power to fight evil when the need arose. His powers are almost exactly like those of Superman. He travels to war-torn Tatonia, beats up the invading dictator General Attila, and stops the war. Then he rescues his boss's daughter, Red Cross nurse Brenda, and kisses her.

== Publication history ==
Wonder Man was created by Will Eisner in the Eisner & Iger Shop for Victor Fox, who was publishing astrology magazines when he ran across his distributor's reports on the incredible sales for National Periodicals' Action Comics in February 1939. He immediately decided to get into the comic book business, setting up offices in the same building DC had theirs, then contacted Eisner. Using the pen name Willis, Eisner wrote and drew the first issue of Wonder Comics, which appeared on the newsstands less than six weeks later.

=== Lawsuit ===
On March 15, 1939, National/DC brought a copyright infringement lawsuit against Fox, due to the character's similarities to Superman, as well as story and illustration elements that were similar to previous Superman adventures. The case was brought to court in Detective Comics, Inc. v. Bruns Publications, Inc., 111 F.2d 432 (2d Cir. 1940), in which Eisner defended the originality of his creation. Despite this testimony, the subsequent decision forced Fox to drop the character after just one issue.

Wonder Comics however, continued as a title, featuring Yarko the Great in #2, then changed its name to Wonderworld Comics featuring The Flame in #3; the series continued for another 30 issues.

This was the first copyright lawsuit in comic book history and set a precedent for DC Comics' vigorous protection of its characters (National Comics Publications v. Fawcett Publications).

The dispute is depicted in disguised fashion in Eisner's semi-autobiographical graphic novel, The Dreamer. This depiction is at odds with Eisner's own testimony at the trial, transcripts of which were unearthed in 2010.

== See also ==
- Master Man, a similar character.
