= Knowledge (legal construct) =

Degree of mens rea

In law, knowledge is one of the degrees of mens rea that constitute part of a crime. For example, in English law, the offence of knowingly being a passenger in a vehicle taken without consent (TWOC) requires that the prosecution prove not only that the defendant was a passenger in a vehicle and that it was taken by the driver without consent, but also that the defendant knew that it was taken without consent.

The mens rea of knowledge refers to knowledge about certain facts rather than "of the law is". It is "a positive belief that a state of affairs exists".

Knowledge can be actual, constructive, or imputed.

== Actual knowledge ==
A defendant does not have actual knowledge if they believe something to the contrary. The standard is subjective and the belief of the defendant need not be reasonable, only honest. For example, in R v. Williams the defendant intervened in what he thought was a mugging but was in fact a citizen's arrest. His mistake was upheld as a defence against a charge of assault. In Beckford v. R the defendant was a police officer who shot and killed V. Beckford claimed that he believed that V was shooting at him. It was found that the correct test was whether D "honestly believed" facts which, if true, would establish a defence. The reasonableness of the belief would be evidential in finding whether it was truly believed.

== Constructive knowledge ==
Knowledge is also found where a defendant suspects that circumstances exist and "deliberately decides not to make any further enquiries" in case his suspicions prove well founded. A common example is a person who purchases significantly inexpensive and unprovenanced but desirable items from a stranger. Such a person is likely to be fixed with constructive knowledge that the items were stolen.

== Imputed knowledge ==
This is relevant in strict liability offences and in corporate crime. For example, if a bar manager delegates his duties to others and those others know of unlawful activities on the premises, the manager can be fixed with imputed knowledge of the unlawful activities.

== Bibliography ==
- Herring, J. (2004). Criminal Law: Text, Cases, and Materials. Oxford: Oxford University Press. pp. 170–172. ISBN 0-19-876578-9.
