= MGM Studios, Inc. v. Grokster, Ltd. =

- Supreme Court of the United States

Argued March 29, 2005 Decided June 27, 2005
- Full case name: Metro-Goldwyn-Mayer Studios, Inc., et al. v. Grokster, Ltd., et al.
- Docket no.: 04-480
- Citations: 545 U.S. 913 (more) 125 S. Ct. 2764; 162 L. Ed. 2d 781; 2005 U.S. LEXIS 5212; 75 U.S.P.Q.2d (BNA) 1001; 33 Media L. Rep. 1865; 18 Fla. L. Weekly Fed. S 547

Case history
- Prior: Motion to dismiss denied, 243 F. Supp. 2d 1073 (C.D. Cal. 2003); summary judgment granted in part to defendants, 259 F. Supp. 2d 1029 (C.D. Cal. 2003); plaintiffs' motion to dismiss counterclaims granted in part, 269 F. Supp. 2d 1213 (C.D. Cal. 2003); affirmed, 380 F.3d 1154 (9th Cir. 2004); cert. granted, 543 U.S. 1032 (2004).
- Subsequent: Remanded, 419 F.3d 1005 (9th Cir. 2005); summary judgment opinion on remand, 454 F. Supp. 2d 966 (C.D. Cal. 2006).

Holding
- Producers of technology who promote the ease of infringing on copyrights can be sued for inducing copyright infringement committed by their users. Ninth Circuit Court of Appeals vacated and remanded.

Court membership
- Chief Justice William Rehnquist Associate Justices John P. Stevens · Sandra Day O'Connor; Antonin Scalia · Anthony Kennedy; David Souter · Clarence Thomas; Ruth Bader Ginsburg · Stephen Breyer

Case opinions
- Majority: Souter, joined by unanimous
- Concurrence: Ginsburg, joined by Rehnquist, Kennedy
- Concurrence: Breyer, joined by Stevens, O'Connor

Laws applied
- Copyright Act of 1976

MGM Studios, Inc. v. Grokster, Ltd., 545 U.S. 913 (2005), is a United States Supreme Court decision in which the Court ruled unanimously that the defendants, peer-to-peer file sharing companies Grokster and Streamcast (maker of Morpheus), could be held liable for inducing copyright infringement by users of their file sharing software. The plaintiffs were a consortium of 28 entertainment companies, led by Metro-Goldwyn-Mayer studios.

== Background ==
Entertainment industry lawsuits against new technologies that enable the copying of copyrighted content date back to the 1980s, when the movie industry sought court injunctions against the sale and use of VCRs. In Sony Corp. v. Universal City Studios in 1984, the U.S. Supreme Court ruled that a technology manufacturer cannot be held liable for its users' copyright infringement if widespread unauthorized copying is unlikely, and if the technology enables significant non-infringing uses as well.

The advent of file sharing via the Internet in the late 1990s, and its enabling of easy and more widespread copying of copyrighted materials, inspired new arguments from the entertainment industry because copying technology had progressed since the 1980s. The Sony precedent was partially modified by the Ninth Circuit in A&M Records v. Napster (2001), which addressed the ease of sharing music files online, and how the designers of the technology could be held liable for contributory copyright infringement and vicarious copyright infringement if such behavior was the primary use of the technology and if the company benefited from it.

Just a few years later, Internet technology had progressed to the point that trading large video files, including those for entire movies, had become viable via popular services including Grokster. The MGM v. Grokster case is frequently characterized as a re-examination of the issues in Sony precedent, in light of rapidly progressing technologies and consumer behaviors. MGM and the other plaintiffs argued that makers of file sharing technology should held liable for their users' copyright infringement, via the contributory and vicarious infringement doctrines.

The entertainment companies appealed to the Supreme Court after losing at two lower courts. The United States District Court for the Central District of California originally dismissed the case in 2003, citing the Sony precedent. On appeal, the Ninth Circuit Court of Appeals upheld the district court's decision after acknowledging that peer-to-peer ("P2P") software has legitimate and legal uses.

Computer and Internet technology companies such as Intel, and trade associations including firms such as Yahoo! and Microsoft, filed amicus curiae briefs in support of the file sharing companies, while the RIAA and MPAA both sided with MGM and the other entertainment companies. Napster, having lost its similar lawsuit about its enabling of users' copyright infringement, filed a brief in support of the entertainment companies. Billionaire Mark Cuban partially financed Grokster's legal battle.

=== Oral arguments ===
During oral arguments, the Supreme Court justices appeared divided between the need to protect new technologies and the need to provide remedies against copyright infringement. Justice Antonin Scalia expressed concern that inventors would be chilled from entering the market by the threat of immediate lawsuits. Justice David Souter questioned how the plaintiffs' interpretation of the law would affect devices like copy machines or the iPod.

The music industry suggested that iPods have a substantial and legitimate commercial use in contrast to Grokster, to which Souter replied, "I know perfectly well that I can buy a CD and put it on my iPod. But I also know if I can get music without buying it, I'm going to do so." On the other hand, the justices seemed troubled at the prospect of ruling that Grokster's alleged business model of actively inducing infringement and then reaping the commercial benefits was shielded from liability.

== Opinion of the Court ==
The opinion of the court was authored by Justice Souter, who wrote: "We hold that one who distributes a device with the object of promoting its use to infringe copyright, as shown by clear expression or other affirmative steps taken to foster infringement, is liable for the resulting acts of infringement by third parties." This resulted in the court-ordered shutdown of the Grokster service and Streamcast's Morpheus service.

While the Court unanimously held that Grokster could be liable for inducing copyright infringement, concurring opinions by several of the Justices showed considerable disagreement over whether the case is substantially different from the Sony precedent, and whether that precedent should be modified. On the one hand, Justice Ginsburg, joined by Kennedy and Rehnquist, claimed that "[t]his case differs markedly from Sony" as there was insufficient evidence of non-infringing uses of the technology. On the other hand, Justice Breyer, joined by Stevens and O'Connor, claimed "a strong demonstrated need for modifying Sony (or for interpreting Sony's standard more strictly) has not yet been shown," primarily because "the nature of ... lawfully swapped files is such that it is reasonable to infer quantities of current lawful use roughly approximate to those at issue in Sony." These justices concurred in the judgment on the narrow ground of Grokster's alleged inducement of its customers to use the product illegally.

In the Grokster ruling, the Court as a whole did not reach a decision to formally overturn the Sony precedent, and instead partially applied it to the specific issues raised by the Grokster and Streamcast technologies. Justice Souter noted: "in the absence of other evidence of intent, a court would be unable to find contributory infringement liability merely based on a failure to take affirmative steps to prevent infringement, if the device otherwise was capable of substantial noninfringing uses. Such a holding would tread too close to the Sony safe harbor." Thus, the Grokster ruling was limited to the specific technologies at issue in the case.

== Subsequent developments ==
Legal researchers hailed the Grokster ruling for striking a fair balance between the need to respect the copyrights of artists, and the benefits of allowing and promoting technological innovation. Conversely, others have criticized the decision for its apparent vagueness, contending that it permits financially powerful organizations like the RIAA and MPAA to effectively hinder development of new technology by actively engaging in litigation against the developers and distributors of such technologies.

On November 7, 2005 Grokster announced that it would no longer offer its peer-to-peer file sharing service. As part of a civil lawsuit enabled by this Supreme Court ruling, Grokster was forced to pay $50 million to various companies in the music and movie industries. Starting in 2008, visitors to the Grokster website (www.grokster.com) encountered this message: "YOUR IP address [...] HAS BEEN LOGGED. Don't think you can't get caught. You are not anonymous."

Streamcast continued to fight the suit on remand. On September 27, 2006, the U.S. District Court for the Central District of California ruled in favor of the entertainment companies and held Streamcast liable for the infringement of its users. Fearing similar lawsuits, Mark Gorton of LimeWire vowed to stop distributing his file sharing program. A lawsuit was brought against LimeWire in 2010. In Arista Records LLC v. Lime Group LLC a district court again ruled in favor of the entertainment industry and issued an injunction against use of the software.
