= Master Man (Fawcett Comics) =

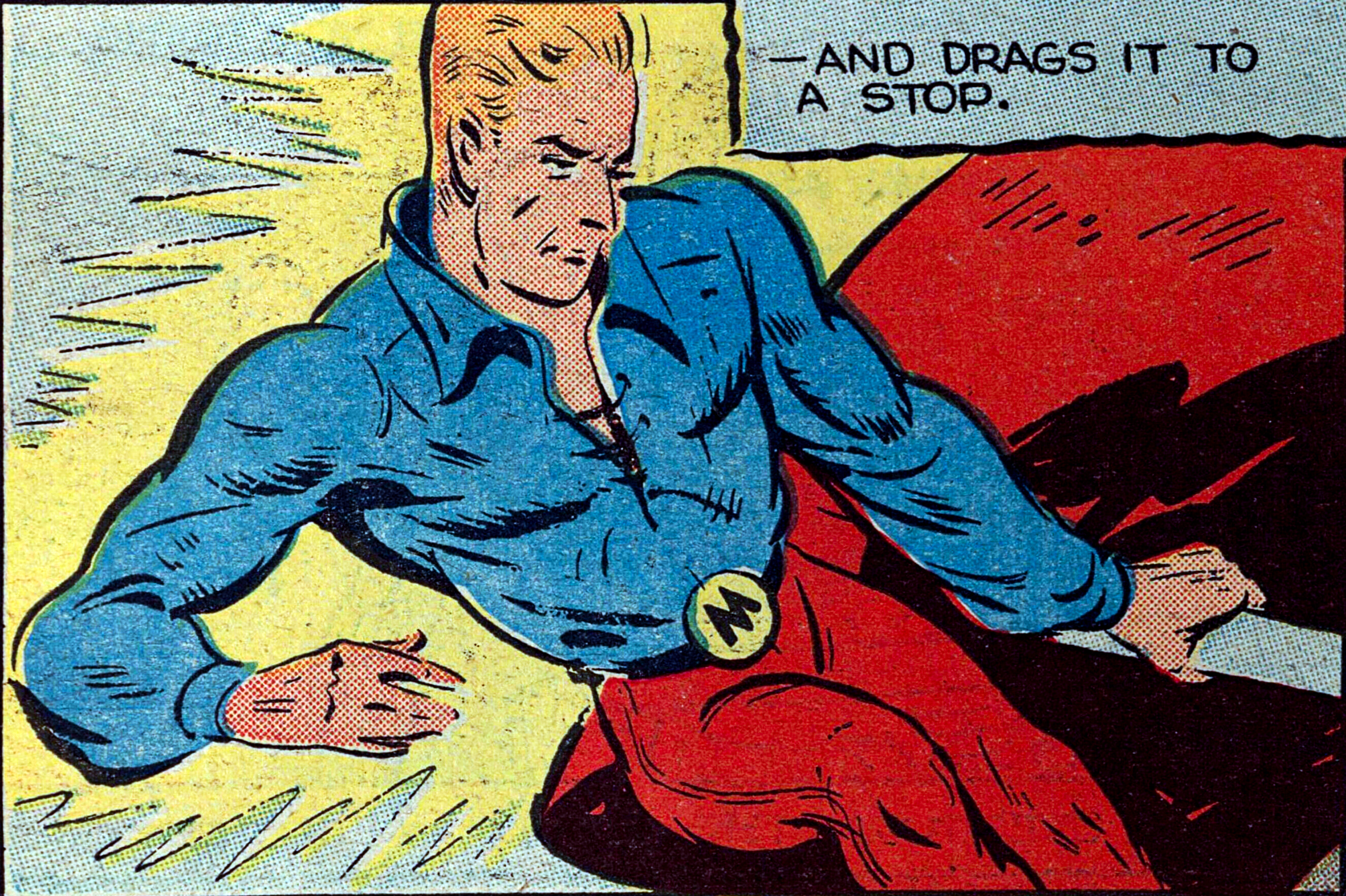

Publication information
- Publisher: Fawcett Comics
- First appearance: Master Comics #1 (March 1940)

In-story information
- Abilities: Superhuman strength, superspeed, & invulnerability.

Master Man is a fictional character created during the 1930s to 1940s period referred to as the Golden Age of Comic Books. A superhero, the character's exact creator is uncertain: his first story, in Fawcett Comics' Master Comics #1 (March 1940), was drawn by Newt Alfred, but that issue's cover was drawn by Harry Fiske. The leader character in the anthology Master Comics, he was described as:

"...the world's greatest hero: Master Man! Stronger than untamed horses! Swifter than raging winds! Braver than mighty lions! Wiser than wisdom, kind as Galahad is Master Man, the wonder of the world! As a boy, young Master Man was weak until a wise old doctor gave the youth a magic capsule, full of vitamins, containing every source of energy known to man! The boy becomes the strongest man on earth! Upon the highest mountain peak he built a solid castle made of solid rock! From there he sees all evil in the world and races to destroy it instantly!"

Master Man could not fly but was super strong and could run at extreme speeds, faster than an automobile. The series lasted six issues, due to a lawsuit threat from National Comics (later DC Comics), the publishers of the Superman series, which had been emboldened by a recent legal victory against a similar character called Wonder Man.

Fawcett would discontinue its comic publishing in 1953. In the 1970s DC Comics licensed Fawcett's Captain Marvel character, and would eventually become the intellectual property owners of Fawcett's superhero characters.

This character has no connection to the Marvel Comics villain, a Nazi called Master Man in the 1970s comic-book series The Invaders, the Master Man from Quality Comics who antagonized Kid Eternity, or the Nazi superhuman in the 2000 AD stories about Zenith.
