= StreamCast Networks =

StreamCast Networks, Inc.
- Formerly: MusicCity
- Industry: Software development
- Defunct: April 22, 2008
- Fate: Bankruptcy
- Products: Morpheus

StreamCast Networks, Inc., was an American corporation, specializing in peer-to-peer software. Formerly named MusicCity, it created Morpheus, which was one of the first major peer-to-peer Internet applications.

StreamCast was a defendant in the MGM v. Grokster case, in which the U.S. Supreme Court unanimously ruled that StreamCast could be sued for inducing copyright infringement for acts taken in the course of marketing file sharing software.

On May 22, 2006, StreamCast Networks filed a lawsuit against eBay in hopes of stopping the distribution of its Skype software. StreamCast claims that the rights for Skype as well as the FastTrack technology were unrightfully taken away from it.

On April 22, 2008, StreamCast Networks filed for Chapter 7 bankruptcy; all employees were laid off and Morpheus became no longer available for download.
