= Madster =

File-sharing service

Madster (initially called Aimster) was a peer-to-peer file sharing service. It was released in Napster's wake in August 2000 and shut down in December 2002 as a result of a lawsuit by the Recording Industry Association of America.

== Origin ==
According to John Deep, a professor at Rensselaer Polytechnic Institute, the Madster software was originally inspired by his daughter's use of instant messaging software. His idea was to combine instant messaging with file sharing. John Deep's daughter Aimee had an interest in providing privacy to her online friends; instant messaging was lacking when it came to privacy protection.

== Features ==
The Control Panel and File Search windows in Madster showing search results after a search for "Bob Dylan"

The Madster service was initially called Aimster, but it was later renamed to Madster due to concerns that the Aimster name infringed AOL's AIM (AOL Instant Messenger) trademark. The Madster software allowed users to share files via instant messaging services. In particular, users could share files specifically with users who were included on a "buddy list" with the advantage of privacy.

Around March 2001, support for encrypted network communications was included in a new release of the Madster software (at the time, the Aimster name was still in use.) Among other things, the Madster service hoped that the US Digital Millennium Copyright Act would have the effect of prohibiting others from monitoring the encrypted Madster network communications. In addition, the Madster operators argued that the encryption meant that they could not be aware of any copyright infringement that took place. Later on, around April-May 2001, a service was introduced wherein a network including tens of thousands of people could be searched for music and other content and new users would by default be added to this network although users could choose to instead restrict trading to buddy list members. At one point, the company announced a premium service that was available for US$4.95 per month.

PC Magazine gave Madster a 1 out of 5 rating of "Dismal," based on interface design, partner advertising, and content selection.

== Recording industry collaboration ==
In 2000, for a short time, Capitol Records authorized Madster (which was called Aimster at the time) to provide some Radiohead video files on the service's Web site and to release a skin for the Madster software that had a Radiohead theme. This collaboration was done for the purpose of promoting a new Radiohead album.

== Legal problems and shutdown ==
In December 2002, the company was ordered by a federal judge to disconnect its computer systems from the Internet. Earlier on in September, the court stated that Aimster had knowledge of copyright infringements, including a Web-based "Aimster Guardian" tutorial that showed copyrighted materials and the tracking of popular songs on the service via "Club Aimster"; the latter also indicated contribution to infringing activity and the monthly fees for the service indicated a financial interest for the Aimster operators in conjunction with infringing usage. The requirement for users to sign up and log in to use the service meant that Aimster was in a position to control the activities of its users. The injunction to disconnect was upheld in June 2003 by the decision in In re Aimster Copyright Litigation of the 7th U.S. Circuit Court of Appeals. In particular, it was found that Madster's support of encrypted file sharing was "willful blindness" and was not a valid defense with regard to copyright infringement. At the same time, a company could avoid copyright liability if it was "highly burdensome" for the company to detect and prevent copyright infringement. In January 2004, the US Supreme Court refused without explanation to hear an appeal of the lower court's ruling.

Madster was represented in court by Boies, Schiller & Flexner, the same law firm which defended Napster. In 2005, Deep sued Boies for malpractice and misappropriation, but lost the case in 2008.
