= List of United States patent law cases =

This is a list of notable patent law cases in the United States in chronological order. The cases have been decided notably by the United States Supreme Court, the United States Court of Appeals for the Federal Circuit (CAFC) or the Board of Patent Appeals and Interferences (BPAI). While the Federal Circuit (CAFC) sits below the Supreme Court in the hierarchy of U.S. federal courts, patent cases only have the right of appeal to the Federal Circuit. The U.S. Supreme Court will only review cases on a discretionary basis and rarely decides patent cases. Unless overruled by a Supreme Court case, Federal Circuit decisions can dictate the results of both patent prosecution and litigation as they are universally binding on all United States district courts and the United States Patent and Trademark Office. An incomplete list of United States Supreme Court patent case law can be found here.

== Early cases (before 1900) ==
- Tyler v. Tuel - Supreme Court, 1810. Held that an assignee of a geographically limited patent right could not bring an action in the assignee's own name. Now obsolete.
- Hotchkiss v. Greenwood - Supreme Court, 1850. Introduced the concept of non-obviousness as patentability requirement in U.S. patent law.
- Le Roy v. Tatham - Supreme Court, 1852. "It is admitted that a principle is not patentable. A principle, in the abstract, is a fundamental truth; an original cause; a motive; these cannot be patented, as no one can claim in either of them an exclusive right."
- O'Reilly v. Morse - Supreme Court, 1853. Influential decision in the development of the law of patent-eligibility (Invalidating method claims for "abstract idea", where steps of method not tied to particular machine).
- Rubber-Tip Pencil Co. v. Howard - Supreme Court, 1874. "An idea of itself is not patentable, but a new device by which it may be made practically useful is."
- City of Elizabeth v. American Nicholson Pavement Co. - Supreme Court, 1878. "Prior use" does not include experimental use.
- Egbert v. Lippmann - Supreme Court, 1881. Held that public use of an invention bars the patenting of it.
- Schillinger v. United States - Supreme Court, 1894. Patent infringement against the United States.

== 1900–1919 ==
- Mast, Foos & Co. v. Stover Manufacturing Company. - Supreme Court, 1900.
- Carnegie Steel Company v. Cambria Iron Company - Supreme Court, 1902.
- Continental Paper Bag Co. v. Eastern Paper Bag Co. - Supreme Court, 1908. Established the principle that patent holders have no obligation to use their patent.
- Leeds And Catlin Company v. Victor Talking Machine Company. - Supreme Court, 1909.
- Expanded Metal Company v. Bradford General Fireproofing Company v. Expanded Metal Company. - Supreme Court, 1909.
- Diamond Rubber Company of New York v. Consolidated Rubber Tire Company - Supreme Court, 1911.
- Henry v. A.B. Dick Co. - Supreme Court, 1912. The Court found contributory infringement for the sale of the defendant's ink with patent owners machine.
- Westinghouse Electric and Manufacturing Company v. Wagner Electric and Manufacturing Company. - Supreme Court, 1912.
- Bauer & Cie. v. O'Donnell - Supreme Court, 1913. Patent licensing terms do not include dictating the price of the product.
- The Fair v. Kohler Die and Specialty Company - Supreme Court, 1913.
- Dowagiac Manufacturing Company v. Minnesota Moline Plow Company & Dowagiac Manufacturing Company v. Smith - Supreme Court, 1915.
- Minerals Separation v. Hyde - Supreme Court, 1916. Holding valid claims directed to critical proportions of oil to ore in a concentrating ore.
- American Well Works Co. v. Layne and Bowler Co. - Supreme Court, 1916.

== 1920–1949 ==
- United States v. General Electric Co. - Supreme Court, 1926. A patentee who has granted a single license to a competitor to manufacture the patented product may lawfully fix the price at which the licensee may sell the product.
- Ex Parte Quayle - 1935. Decision related to the patent application process.
- General Talking Pictures Corp. v. Western Electric Co. - U.S. Supreme Court, 1938; upholding enforceability of field-of-use limitations in a patent license
- Altvater v. Freeman - Supreme Court, 1943. Although a licensee had maintained payments of royalties, a claim of invalidity of the licensed patent still presented a justiciable case or controversy.
- Sinclair & Carrol Co. v. Interchemical Corporation - Supreme Court, 1945. Selection of a chemical from a catalog based on predetermined qualifications is obvious.
- Funk Brothers Seed Co. v. Kalo Inoculant Co. - Supreme Court, 1948. A facially trivial implementation of a natural principle or phenomenon of nature is not eligible for a patent.

== 1950–1969 ==
- Great Atlantic & Pacific Tea Co. v. Supermarket Equipment Corp. - Supreme Court, 1950. Only when the whole in some way exceeds the sum of its parts is a combination of old elements patentable.
- Graver Tank & Manufacturing Co. v. Linde Air Products Co. - Supreme Court, 1950. Introduced the doctrine of equivalents.
- In re Aller - CCPA, 1955. It is not inventive to discover the optimum or workable ranges by routine experimentation.
- Aro Mfg. Co. v. Convertible Top Replacement Co. - Supreme Court, 1961. Redefined the doctrine of repair and reconstruction
- Wilbur-Ellis Co. v. Kuther - Supreme Court, 1964. Extended the repair-reconstruction doctrine of Aro Mfg. Co. v. Convertible Top Replacement Co.
- Compco Corp. v. Day-Brite Lighting, Inc. - Supreme Court, 1964. Held that state law that, in effect, duplicated the protections of the US patent laws was preempted by federal law.
- Sears, Roebuck & Co. v. Stiffel Co. - Supreme Court, 1964. Companion to Compco Corp. v. Day-Brite Lighting, Inc..
- United States v. Adams - Supreme Court, 1965. Wet battery including a combination of known elements not obvious because the operating characteristics were unexpected and improved over then-existing wet batteries.
- Graham v. John Deere Co. - Supreme Court, 1966. Clarified the requirement of nonobviousness.
- Anderson's-Black Rock, Inc. v. Pavement Salvage Co. - Supreme Court, 1969. Related to obviousness.
- Lear, Inc. v. Adkins - Supreme Court, 1969. Overturned the doctrine of licensee estoppel.

== 1970–1979 ==
- Gottschalk v. Benson - Supreme Court, 1972. Held that an algorithm is not patentable if the claim would preempt all uses of the algorithm.
- Honeywell v. Sperry Rand - 1973. Invalidated the 1964 patent for the ENIAC, the world's first general-purpose electronic digital computer, thus putting the invention of the electronic digital computer into the public domain.
- United States v. Glaxo Group Ltd. - Supreme Court, 1973. Relation between patent law and antitrust law.
- Dann v. Johnston - Supreme Court, 1976. Patentability of a claim for a business method patent (but the decision turns on obviousness rather than patent-eligibility).
- Sakraida v. Ag Pro - Supreme Court, 1976. Arranging old elements with each performing the same function it had been known to perform fell under the head of "work of the skillful mechanic, not of that of the inventor".
- In re Wertheim - United States Court of Customs Appeals, 1976. Where a claim range overlaps or lies inside a range disclosed by the prior art, a prima facie case of obviousness exists.
- In re Antonie - Federal Circuit, 1977. A parameter must be recognized as a result-effective variable before a determination of routine experimentation.
- Parker v. Flook - Supreme Court, 1978. Ruled that a mathematical algorithm is not patentable if its application itself is not novel.

== 1980–1989 ==
- Diamond v. Chakrabarty - Supreme Court, 1980. Ruled that a genetically modified micro-organism can be patented.
- Diamond v. Diehr - Supreme Court, 1981. Ruled that the execution of a process, controlled by running a computer program was patentable.
- MedImmune, Inc. v. Genentech, Inc. - Supreme Court, 1983 onwards. Involving a fundamental technology required for the artificial synthesis of antibody molecules.
- Titanium Metals Corp. of America v. Banner - Federal Circuit, 1985. Prima facie obvious when claims ranges are close to prior art ranges.
- Bonito Boats, Inc. v. Thunder Craft Boats, Inc. - Supreme Court, 1989. State law partially duplicating and therefore interfering with federal patent law.

== 1990–1999 ==
- In re Woodruff - Federal Circuit, 1990. Hold that claim limited to "more than 5%" prima facie obvious over prior art teaching "about 1-5%".
- Eli Lilly & Co. v. Medtronic, Inc. - Supreme Court, 1990. Held that premarketing activity conducted to gain approval of a device under the Federal Food, Drug, and Cosmetic Act is exempted from a finding of infringement.
- Mallinckrodt, Inc. v. Medipart, Inc. - CAFC, 1992. The court appeared to overrule or drastically limit many years of US Supreme Court precedent affirming the patent exhaustion doctrine.
- Markman v. Westview Instruments, Inc. - Supreme Court, 1996. Held that an issue [of claims interpretation/construction] designated as a matter of law is resolved by the judge [and subject to de novo review by appellate court], and an issue construed as a question of fact is determined by the jury.
- Warner-Jenkinson Company, Inc. v. Hilton Davis Chemical Co. - Supreme Court, 1997. Updated the doctrine of equivalents.
- In re Geisler - Federal Circuit, 1997. Claim reciting "50 to 100 Angstroms" prima facie obvious in view of prior art teaching that it should be no less than 100 Angstroms.
- State Street Bank v. Signature Financial Group - CAFC, 1998. Defined the scope of a business method patent.
- Pfaff v. Wells Electronics, Inc. - Supreme Court, 1998. Determined what constituted being "on sale" for the purposes of barring the grant of a patent for an invention.

== 2000–2004 ==
- Ex Parte Bowman - BPAI, 2001. Later overturned by Ex Parte Lundgren (2004)
- Festo Corp. v. Shoketsu Kinzoku Kogyo Kabushiki Co. - Supreme Court, 2002. Related to the doctrine of equivalents.
- MVDDS dispute - 2002 onwards.
- Immersion v. Sony - 2002. Related to vibration functions in their gaming controllers. Dropped in 2007.
- In re Peterson - Federal Circuit, 2003. A prior art reference that discloses a range encompassing a somewhat narrower claimed range is sufficient to establish a prima facie case of obviousness.
- Ex Parte Lundgren - BPAI, 2004. Found that process inventions do not have to be in the technological arts in order to be patentable.
- Iron Grip Barbell Co, Inc. v. USA Sports, Inc - Federal Circuit, 2004. Applicant can rebut a presumption of obviousness by showing that the prior art taught away from the claimed invention or that there are new and unexpected results relative to the prior art.

== 2005–2009 ==
- Arizona Cartridge Remanufacturers Association Inc. v. Lexmark International Inc. - United States Court of Appeals for the Ninth Circuit, 2005. Found that end-user license agreements (EULA) are enforceable in some cases.
- In re Harris - Federal Circuit, 2005. Claimed ranges that overlap prior art range are prima facie obvious.
- Merck KGaA v. Integra Lifesciences I, Ltd. - Supreme Court, 2005. Related to Research exemption.
- LizardTech, Inc. v. Earth Resource Mapping, Inc. - Federal Circuit, 2005. Related to the written description requirement of 35 U.S.C. § 112.
- Alcatel-Lucent v. Microsoft - 2006. Multiple lawsuits over several patents relating to MP3 encoding and compression technologies.
- Ariad v. Lilly - 2006. Broad infringement case related to a ubiquitous transcription factor.
- EBay Inc. v. MercExchange, L.L.C. - Supreme Court, 2006. Ruled that an injunction should not automatically issue based on a finding of patent infringement.
- Illinois Tool Works Inc. v. Independent Ink, Inc. - Supreme Court, 2006. Related to "tying" arrangements of patented products.
- KSR v. Teleflex - Supreme Court, 2007. Concerning the issue of obviousness as applied to patent claims.
- Microsoft v. AT&T - Supreme Court, 2007. Related to international enforceability of U.S. software patents.
- TiVo Inc. v. EchoStar Corp. - Was the base for the development of a new test for contempt with regards to repeated patent infringement.
- SRI International, Inc. v. Internet Security Systems, Inc. CAFC, 2008. Set precedent as to whether unpublished papers stored on FTP servers constituted a prior art bar.
- Quanta v. LG Electronics - Supreme Court, 2008. Patent exhaustion and its applicability to certain types of method patents.
- Bilski v. Kappos - Supreme Court, 2009. Re-focused subject-matter eligibility test on the three judicial exclusions "laws of nature, physical phenomena, and abstract ideas."
- Ecolab v. FMC - CAFC, 2009. A dispute over patents for similar chemical processes.
- Perfect Web Technologies, Inc. v. InfoUSA, Inc. - CAFC, 2009. Applied KSR-style obviousness analysis to invalidate a patent.
- Abbott v. Sandoz - Pharmaceutical patent case involving differentiation of products by process.
- Phillips v. AWH Corp. - Clarified the hierarchy of evidentiary sources usable for claim construction in patent law.

== 2010–2014 ==
- Finjan, Inc. v. Secure Computing Corp. - Court of Appeals, Federal Circuit. Related to system and storage-medium as well as method claims.
- Uniloc USA, Inc. v. Microsoft Corp. - Court of Appeals, Federal Circuit. Rejected the 25 percent rule.
- Microsoft Corp. v. i4i Ltd. Partnership - Supreme Court, 2011. Invalidity must be shown by clear and convincing evidence.
- Mayo Collaborative Services v. Prometheus Laboratories, Inc. - Supreme Court, 2012. Invalidated attempt to patent natural law.
- Bowman v. Monsanto - Supreme Court, 2012. Patent exhaustion does not permit a farmer to reproduce patented seeds through planting and harvesting without the patent holder's permission.
- Association for Molecular Pathology v. Myriad Genetics - Supreme Court, 2013. Invalidated patents on naturally occurring DNA segments, but not on cDNA.
- Alice Corp. v. CLS Bank International - Supreme Court, 2014. Invalidated patent based on abstract idea.

== Since 2015 ==
- Teva Pharmaceuticals USA, Inc. v. Sandoz, Inc. - Supreme Court, 2015. Claim interpretation in patent, standard of review by the Federal Circuit.
- Kimble v. Marvel Entertainment, LLC - Supreme Court, 2015. Patent misuse is governed by patent law policy, and need not comport with antitrust policy if the two differ.

== See also ==
- List of United States Supreme Court patent case law
- United States patent law
- List of patent case law
- Category:United States copyright case law
