= List of patent case law =

This list contains an alphabetical listing of historically significant or leading case law in the area of patent law. For a list of patent law cases in just the United States, see United States patent law cases.

== A ==
- Aerotel v Telco and Macrossan's Application (UK, 2006)
- Anderson’s-Black Rock, Inc. v. Pavement Salvage Co. (US, 1969)
- Apple Inc. litigation (multiple, multinational cases)
- Apple v. HTC (US, 2010)
- Apple Inc. v. Samsung Electronics Co., Ltd. (multiple, multinational cases, ongoing)
- Ariad v. Lilly (US, 2006)
- Arizona Cartridge Remanufacturers Association Inc. v. Lexmark International Inc. (US, 2005)
- Association for Molecular Pathology v. Myriad Genetics (US, 2013)
- Atomic Energy Generation Device Case (JP, 1969) - relates to the concept of "incomplete invention"
- Auction Method/Hitachi (EPO, 2004)

== B ==
- Bilski v. Kappos (US, )
- Bowman v. Monsanto (US, 2012)
- Bauer & Cie. v. O'Donnell (US, 1913)

== C ==
- Catnic Components Ltd. v. Hill & Smith Ltd. (UK, 1982)
- City of Elizabeth v. American Nicholson Pavement Co. (US, 1878)
- Continental Paper Bag Co. v. Eastern Paper Bag Co. (US, 1908)
- Creative Technology v. Apple (US and international, 2006)

== D ==
- Diamond v. Chakrabarty (US, 1980)
- Diamond v. Diehr (US, 1981)

== E ==
- EBay Inc. v. MercExchange, L.L.C. (US, 2006)
- Egbert v. Lippmann (US, 1881)
- Egyptian Goddess v. Swisa (US, 2008)
- Ex Parte Bowman (US, 2001)
- Ex Parte Lundgren (US, 2004)
- Ex Parte Quayle (US, 1935)

== F ==
- Festo Corp. v. Shoketsu Kinzoku Kogyo Kabushiki Co. (US, 2002)
- Free World Trust v. Électro Santé Inc. (CA, 2000)

== G ==
- Gottschalk v. Benson (US, 1972)
- Graham v. John Deere Co. (US, 1966)
- Graver Tank & Manufacturing Co. v. Linde Air Products Co. (US, 1950)

== H ==
- Harvard College v. Canada (Commissioner of Patents): patent of higher lifeforms (CA, 2002)
- Honeywell v. Sperry Rand (US, 1973)
- Hotchkiss v. Greenwood (US, 1850)
- Huawei Technologies Co. Ltd v ZTE Corp. and ZTE Deutschland GmbH (European Court of Justice, C-170/13, 2015), judgement on standard-essential patents

== I ==
- Illinois Tool Works Inc. v. Independent Ink, Inc. (US, 2006)
- Improver v Remington (UK, 1990)
- In re Bilski (US, 2008)
- In re Seagate Technology (US, 2007)

== K ==
- Kirin-Amgen v Hoechst Marion Roussel (UK, 2004)
- Kodak v. Apple (US, 2010, ongoing)
- KSR v. Teleflex (US, 2007)

== L ==
- Lear, Inc. v. Adkins (US, 1969)

== M ==
- Markman v. Westview Instruments, Inc. (US, 1996)
- Mayo v. Prometheus (US, 2011)
- MedImmune, Inc. v. Genentech, Inc. (US, 2007)
- Menashe v. William Hill (UK, 2002)
- Merck v. Integra (US, 2005)
- Monsanto Canada Inc. v. Schmeiser (CA, 2004)
- Motorola Mobility v. Apple Inc. (US, 2010)

== N ==
- Nokia v. Apple (US & international, 2009)

== O ==
- Orange-Book-Standard (DE, 2009), on the interaction between patent law and standards

== P ==
- Parker v. Flook (US, 1978)
- Pension Benefit Systems Partnership (EPO, 2000)
- Pfaff v. Wells Electronics, Inc. (US, 1998)

== Q ==
- Quanta v. LG Electronics (US, 2008)

== S ==
- State Street Bank v. Signature Financial Group (US, 1998)

== T ==
- Typhoon Touch v. Dell (US, 2008)

== U ==
- United States v. Adams (US, 1966)

== W ==
- Warner-Jenkinson Company, Inc. v. Hilton Davis Chemical Co. (US, 1997)

== See also ==
- List of decisions and opinions of the Enlarged Board of Appeal of the European Patent Office
- List of decisions of the EPO Boards of Appeal relating to Article 52(2) and (3) EPC
- List of UK judgments relating to excluded subject matter
- List of United States patent law cases
- List of trademark case law
- List of copyright case law
