= List of United States Supreme Court patent case law =

This is an incomplete list of Supreme Court of the United States cases in the area of patent law.

== 19th century ==
Case	Citation	Year	Vote	Classification	Subject Matter	Opinions	Statute Interpreted	Summary
19th century
Tyler v. Tuel	10 U.S. 324	1810					Patent Act of 1793	Assignee of geographically-limited patent right could not bring action in their own name.
Evans v. Jordan	13 U.S. 199	1815					Patent Act of 1800, An Act for the Relief of Oliver Evans	
Evans v. Eaton	16 U.S. 454	1818					Patent Act of 1793, An Act for the Relief of Oliver Evans	
Evans v. Eaton	20 U.S. 356	March 20, 1822					Patent Act of 1793, An Act for the Relief of Oliver Evans	A patent on an improved machine must clearly describe how the machine differs from the prior art.
Evans v. Hettich	20 U.S. 453	1822					Patent Act of 1793, An Act for the Relief of Oliver Evans	
Pennock v. Dialogue	27 U.S. (2 Pet.) 1	1829						Commercial exploitation of invention for long period forfeits right to patent.
Grant v. Raymond	31 U.S. (6 Pet.) 218	1832			improved machine for making hats	Chief Justice Marshall	Patent Act of 1800	Effect of a reissued patent having a corrected specification
Hogg v. Emerson	47 U.S. (6 How.) 437	1848			improved machine – steam engine	Justice Woodbury	Patent Act of 1836, Section 17	
Gayler v. Wilder	51 U.S. 477	1850						Novelty means knowledge or use accessible to the public.
Hotchkiss v. Greenwood	52 U.S. 248	1850						Introduced the concept of non-obviousness as a patentability requirement in U.S. patent law.
Le Roy v. Tatham	55 U.S. 156	1852						
O'Reilly v. Morse	56 U.S. 62	1853						Patent-eligibility: patent-eligibility (Invalidating method claims for "abstract idea", where steps of method not tied to particular machine). Undue patent claim breadth: Patent holder can only hold a patent on the steps taken, not on every means to the result.
Corning v. Burden	56 U.S. 252	1853						
Winans v. Denmead	56 U.S. 330	1853						Established doctrine of equivalents: Even if not literally within the claims, a device infringes if it arrives at the same result in the same way.
Godfrey v. Eames	68 U.S. 317	1863						Continuing application.
Burr v. Duryee	68 U.S. 531	1863						
Seymour v. Osborne	78 U.S. 516	1870						Prior art must enable a person having ordinary skill in the art (PHOSITA) to make and use the invention.
Coffin v. Ogden	85 U.S. 120	1873					Patent Act of 1836	Anticipating invention or discovery must be complete and capable of working to invalidate a patent for lack of novelty, but the prior knowledge or use does not need to be public. The words "by others" only require that the invention be known or used by someone other than the applicant.
Rubber-Tip Pencil Co. v. Howard	87 U.S. 498	1874						
Cochrane v. Deener	94 U.S. 780	1876 (March 19, 1877)						Patentability.
City of Elizabeth v. American Nicholson Pavement Co.	97 U.S. 126	1878						"Prior use" does not include experimental use.
Trade-Mark Cases	100 U.S. 82	1879	9–0		Constitutional basis for trademark regulation	Majority: Miller (unanimous)		The Copyright/Patent Clause does not give Congress the power to regulate trademarks.
Tilghman v. Proctor	102 U.S. 707	1880						
Sharp v. Dover Stamping Co.	103 U.S. 250	1880						
Egbert v. Lippmann	104 U.S. 333	1881						Public use of an invention bars patent.
Atlantic Works v. Brady	107 U.S. 192	1883						
Hollister v. Benedict & Burnham Mfg. Co.	113 U.S. 59	1885						
Rowell v. Lindsay	113 U.S. 97	1885						
Consolidated Safety-Valve Co. v. Crosby Steam Gauge & Valve Co.	113 U.S. 157	1885						
Voss v. Fisher	113 U.S. 213	1885						
White v. Dunbar	119 U.S. 47	1886						
Andrews and others v. Hovey (The Driven-Well Cases)	123 U.S. 267	1887			Improved method of constructing wells		Patent Act of 1839, Section 7	
The Telephone Cases	126 U.S. 1	1888						
McClain v. Ortmayer	141 U.S. 419	1891						
Schillinger v. United States	155 U.S. 163	1894						Patent infringement claim against the United States cannot be asserted.
Black Diamond Coal Mining Company v. Excelsior Coal Company	156 U.S. 611	1895						
Consolidated Electric Light Co v. McKeesport Light Co	159 U.S. 465	1895						
Risdon Iron & Locomotive Works v. Medart	158 U.S. 68	1895						
Boyden Power-Brake Co. v. Westinghouse	170 U.S. 537	1898						

== 1900–1920 ==
Case	Citation	Year	Vote	Classification	Subject Matter	Opinions	Statute Interpreted	Summary
1900–1920
Mast, Foos & Co. v. Stover Mfg. Co.	177 U.S. 485	1900						
Carnegie Steel Co. v. Cambria Iron Co.	185 U.S. 403	1902						
Busch v. Jones	184 U.S. 598	1902						
Continental Paper Bag Co. v. Eastern Paper Bag Co.	210 U.S. 405	1908						Established the principle that patent holders have no obligation to use their patent.
Leeds and Catlin Co. v. Victor Talking Machine Co.	29 U.S. 495 & 213 U.S. 325	1909						
Expanded Metal Co. v. Bradford General Fireproofing Co. v. Expanded Metal Co.	214 U.S. 366	1909						
Diamond Rubber Co. v. Consolidated Rubber Tire Co.	220 U.S. 428	1911				Inventor not obliged to know scientific theory underlying invention; can be pure empiricist		
Henry v. A.B. Dick Co.	224 U.S. 1	1912						The Court found contributory infringement for the sale of the defendant's ink with patent owner's machine (inherency doctrine).
Westinghouse Elec. & Mfg. Co, v. Wagner Elec. & Mfg. Co.	225 U.S. 604	1912						
Bauer & Cie. v. O'Donnell	229 U.S. 1	1913						Patent right does not include right to dictate the price of the product.
The Fair v. Kohler Die and Specialty Co.	228 U.S. 22	1913						
Dowagiac Mfg. Co. v. Minnesota Moline Plow Co. & Dowagiac Mfg. Company v. Smith	235 U.S. 641	1915						
Minerals Separation v. Hyde	242 U.S. 261	1916						Holding valid claims directed to critical proportions of oil to ore in a concentrating ore.
American Well Works Co. v. Layne and Bowler Co.	241 U.S. 257	1916						
Motion Picture Patents Co. v. Universal Film Mfg. Co.	243 U.S. 502	1917						Holding unenforceable a restriction that a user of a patented film projector must use it to screen only such films as the patentee authorized; tie-in is patent misuse

== 1921–1959 ==
Case	Citation	Year	Vote	Classification	Subject Matter	Opinions	Statute Interpreted	Summary
1921–1959
Eibel Process Co. v. Minnesota & Ontario Paper Co.	261 U.S. 45	1923						
United States v. General Electric Co.	272 U.S. 476	1926						A patentee who has granted a single license to a competitor to manufacture the patented product may lawfully fix the price at which the licensee may sell the product.
American Fruit Growers v. Brogdex Co.	283 U.S. 1	1931						
Carbice Corp. v. Patents Development Corp.	283 U.S. 27	1931						
Carbice Corp. v. American Patents Dev. Co.	283 U.S. 420	1931						
U.S. v. Dubilier Condenser Corporation	289 U.S. 178	1933						
Smith v. Snow	294 U.S. 1	1935						
Waxham v. Smith	294 U.S. 20	1935						
Keystone Driller Co. v. Northwest Engineering Corp.	294 U.S. 42	1935						
General Talking Pictures Corp. v. Western Electric Co.	304 U.S. 175	1938						Upholding enforceability of field-of-use limitations in a patent license
Kellogg Co. v. National Biscuit Co.	305 U.S. 111	1938						Once a patent has expired, the benefits of the invention are to be enjoyed by the public and may not be extended by trademark.
Mackay Radio & Telegraph Co. v. Radio Corporation of America	306 U.S. 618	1939						
Morton Salt Co. v. G.S. Suppiger Co.	314 U.S. 488	1942						Patent misuse.
United States v. Univis Lens Co.	316 U.S. 241	1942						Explaining the exhaustion doctrine and applying it to find an antitrust violation because Univis' ownership of patents did not exclude its restrictive practices from the antitrust laws.
Altvater v. Freeman	319 U.S. 359	1943						Although a licensee had maintained payments of royalties, a claim of invalidity of the licensed patent still presented a justiciable case or controversy.
Universal Oil Products Co. v. Globe Oil & Refining Co.	322 U.S. 471	1944						
Special Equipment Co. v. Coe	324 U.S. 370	1945						
Sinclair & Carrol Co. v. Interchemical Corporation	325 U.S. 327	1945						Selection of a chemical from a catalog based on predetermined qualifications is obvious.
Transparent-Wrap Mach. Corp. v. Stokes & Smith Co.	329 U.S. 637	Feb. 3, 1947						
Funk Brothers Seed Co. v. Kalo Inoculant Co.	333 U.S. 127	1948						A facially trivial implementation of a natural principle or phenomenon of nature is not eligible for a patent.
Great Atlantic & Pacific Tea Co. v. Supermarket Equipment Corp.	340 U.S. 147	1950						Only when the whole in some way exceeds the sum of its parts is a combination of old elements patentable.
Graver Tank & Manufacturing Co. v. Linde Air Products Co.	339 U.S. 605	1950						Introduced the doctrine of equivalents.
Kerotest Mfg. Co. v. C-O-Two Fire Eqpt. Co.	342 U.S. 180	1952						
Besser Mfg. v. United States	343 U.S. 444	1952						Compulsory licensing remedy in patent antitrust case; joint agreement not to license (veto)
Sanford v. Kepner	344 U.S. 13	1952						
U.S. Gypsum v. National Gypsum	352 U.S. 457	1957						https://www.oyez.org/cases/1956/11
Fourco Glass Co. v. Transmirra Products Corp.	353 U.S. 222	1957						

== 1960–1969 ==
Case	Citation	Year	Vote	Classification	Subject Matter	Opinions	Statute Interpreted	Summary
1960–1969
Aro Mfg. Co. v. Convertible Top Replacement Co. (Aro I)	365 U.S. 336	Feb. 27, 1961						Redefined the doctrine of repair and reconstruction
Schnell v. Eckrich & Sons	365 U.S. 260	1961						
Glidden v. Zdanok	370 U.S. 530	1962						CPPA court
White Motor v. U.S.	83 U.S. 253	1963						antitrust, tying
Sperry v. Florida	373 U.S. 379	1963						patent practice
U.S. v. Singer Mfg. Co.	374 U.S. 174	1963						Sherman Act
Wilbur-Ellis Co. v. Kuther	377 U.S. 422	1964						Extended the repair-reconstruction doctrine of Aro Mfg. Co. v. Convertible Top Replacement Co.
Sears, Roebuck & Co. v. Stiffel Co.	376 U.S. 225	1964						Companion to Compco Corp. v. Day-Brite Lighting, Inc.. State unfair competition law.
Compco Corp. v. Day-Brite Lighting, Inc.	376 U.S. 234	1964						Held that state law that, in effect, duplicated the protections of the US patent laws was preempted by federal law.
Aro Mfg. Co. v. Convertible Top Replacement Co. (Aro II)	377 U.S. 476	1964						
Brulotte v. Thys Co.	379 U.S. 29	1964						Royalties after expiration of patent non-enforceable
Walker Process Equipment, Inc. v. Food Machinery & Chemical Corp.	382 U.S. 172	1965						antitrust
Hazeltine Research, Inc. v. Brenner	382 U.S. 252	1965						prior art
Graham v. John Deere Co.	383 U.S. 1	Feb. 21, 1966						Clarified the requirement of nonobviousness.
United States v. Adams	383 U.S. 39	Feb. 21, 1965						Wet battery including a combination of known elements not obvious because the operating characteristics were unexpected and improved over then-existing wet batteries.
Brenner v. Manson	383 U.S. 519	March 21, 1966						
Zenith Radio Corp. v. Hazeltine Research, Inc. (Zenith I)	395 U.S. 100	1969						
Lear, Inc. v. Adkins	395 U.S. 653	1969						Overturned the doctrine of licensee estoppel.
Anderson's-Black Rock, Inc. v. Pavement Salvage Co.	396 U.S. 57	1969						Related to obviousness.

== 1970–1979 ==
Case	Citation	Year	Vote	Classification	Subject Matter	Opinions	Statute Interpreted	Summary
1970–1979
Zenith Radio Corp. v. Hazeltine Research, Inc. (Zenith II)	401 U.S. 321	1971						Patent misuse.
Blonder-Tongue v. University of Illinois	402 U.S. 313	1971						Collateral estoppel.
Deepsouth Packing Co. v. Laitram Corp.	406 U.S. 518	1972						
Brunette Mach. Works, Limited v. Kockum Industries, Inc.	406 U.S. 706	1972						
Gottschalk v. Benson	409 U.S. 63	1972						Held that an algorithm is not patentable if the claim would preempt all uses of the algorithm.
United States v. Glaxo Group Ltd.	410 U.S. 52	1973						Relation between patent law and antitrust law.
Kewanee Oil v. Bicron	416 U.S. 470	1974						State trade secret law not preempted by patent law.
Dann v. Johnston	425 U.S. 219	1976						Patentability of a claim for a business method patent (but the decision turns on obviousness rather than patent-eligibility).
Sakraida v. Ag Pro	425 U.S. 273	1976						An invention that arranges old elements with each performing the same function it had been known to perform fell under the heading of "work of the skillful mechanic, not of that of the inventor". See Non-obviousness in United States patent law.
Parker v. Flook	437 U.S. 584	1978						Ruled that a mathematical algorithm is not patentable if its application itself is not novel.
Aronson v. Quick Point Pencil	440 U.S. 257	1979						When a patent is not issued (or found invalid after issuance) a licensee is not required to pay for using the invention, even though the license terms mandate otherwise under a State Law.

== 1980–1989 ==
Case	Citation	Year	Vote	Classification	Subject Matter	Opinions	Statute Interpreted	Summary
1980–1989
Diamond v. Chakrabarty	447 U.S. 303	1980						Patentable subject matter: A genetically-modified micro-organism is patentable.
Dawson Chemical Co. v. Rohm and Haas Co.	444 U.S. 1012	1980						Patent misuse.
Diamond v. Diehr	450 U.S. 175	1981						The execution of a process controlled by running a computer program was patentable.
General Motors Corp. v. Devex Corp.	461 U.S. 648	1983						
Dennison Mfg. Co. v. Panduit Corp.	475 U.S. 809	1986						Nonobviousness standard of review
Christianson v. Colt Industries Operating Corp.	486 U.S. 800	1988						Federal Circuit jurisdiction.
Bonito Boats, Inc. v. Thunder Craft Boats, Inc.	489 U.S. 141	1989						State law partially duplicating and therefore interfering with federal patent law. Reaffirmed Stiffel.

== 1990–1999 ==
Case	Citation	Year	Vote	Classification	Subject Matter	Opinions	Statute Interpreted	Summary
1990–1999
Eli Lilly & Co. v. Medtronic, Inc.	496 U.S. 661	1990						Held that premarketing activity conducted to gain approval of a device under the Federal Food, Drug, and Cosmetic Act is exempted from a finding of infringement.
Cardinal Chemical Co. v. Morton Intern., Inc.	508 U.S. 83	1993						
Asgrow Seed Co. v. Winterboer	513 U.S. 179	1995						PVPA
Markman v. Westview Instruments, Inc.	517 U.S. 370	1996						Held that an issue [of claims interpretation/construction] designated as a matter of law is resolved by the judge [and subject to de novo review by appellate court], and an issue construed as a question of fact is determined by the jury.
Warner-Jenkinson Company, Inc. v. Hilton Davis Chemical Co.	520 U.S. 17	1997.						Updated the doctrine of equivalents.
Pfaff v. Wells Electronics, Inc.	525 U.S. 55	1998						Determined what constitutes being "on sale" for the purposes of barring the grant of a patent for an invention.
Dickinson v. Zurko	527 U.S. 150	1999						APA standards of review; PTO fact-finding gets "substantial evidence" standard on review
Florida Prepaid v. College Savings Bank	527 U.S. 627	1999						Unconstitutional for Congress to eliminate states' 11th Amendment sovereign immunity against patent infringements.

== 2000–2009 ==
Case	Citation	Year	Vote	Classification	Subject Matter	Opinions	Statute Interpreted	Summary
2000–2009
Nelson v. Adams	529 U.S. 460	2000						Procedure.
J. E. M. Ag Supply, Inc. v. Pioneer Hi-Bred International, Inc.	534 U.S. 124	2001						Utility patents & plant patents. Plant breeds are patentable subject matter.
Festo Corp. v. Shoketsu Kinzoku Kogyo Kabushiki Co.	535 U.S. 722	2002						In the doctrine of equivalents, prosecution history estoppel creates only a rebuttable presumption against infringement.
Holmes Group v. Vornado	535 U.S. 826	2002						Patent issues raised in counterclaim do not give rise to Federal Circuit jurisdiction
Merck KGaA v. Integra Lifesciences I, Ltd.	545 U.S. 193	2005						Related to Research exemption.
EBay Inc. v. MercExchange, L.L.C.	547 U.S. 388	2006						Ruled that an injunction should not automatically issue based on a finding of patent infringement.
Illinois Tool Works Inc. v. Independent Ink, Inc.	547 U.S. 28	2006						Related to "tying" arrangements of patented products.
LabCorp v. Metabolite, Inc.	548 U.S. 124	June 22, 2006						Dismissed as improvidently granted. Breyer dissented from the DIG, with Stevens & Souter joining.
MedImmune, Inc. v. Genentech, Inc.	549 U.S. 118	2007	8-1	Standing of a Paying Licensee to Challenge Validity of Licensed Patent	Actual Controversy Requirement	MedImmune was not required to break its contract before suing, because "The rule that a plaintiff must [...] risk treble damages and the loss of 80 percent of its business[] before seeking a declaration of its actively contested legal rights finds no support in Article III." The Declaratory Judgment Act only requires that disputes be non-hypothetical and non-abstract. The mere fact that royalties were still being paid, the Court ruled, was not sufficient to remove the courts' jurisdiction under Article III.	28 USC 2201	Declaratory judgment jurisdiction is available to patent licensees who continue to pay royalty and have not breached the licensing agreement.
KSR v. Teleflex	550 U.S. 398	2007						Concerning the issue of obviousness as applied to patent claims.
Microsoft v. AT&T	550 U.S. 437	2007						Related to international enforceability of U.S. software patents.
Quanta v. LG Electronics	553 U.S. 617	2008						Patent exhaustion and its applicability to certain types of method patents.

== 2010–2019 ==
Case	Citation	Year	Vote	Classification	Subject Matter	Opinions	Statute Interpreted	Summary
2010–2019
Bilski v. Kappos	561 U.S. 593	2010						Refocused subject matter eligibility test on the three judicial exclusions "laws of nature, physical phenomena, and abstract ideas."
Global-Tech Appliances, Inc. v. SEB S.A.	563 U.S. 754	2011						
Stanford v. Roche	563 U.S. 776	2011						Bayh-Dole
Microsoft Corp. v. i4i Ltd. Partnership	564 U.S. 91	2011						Invalidity must be shown by clear and convincing evidence.
Mayo Collaborative Services v. Prometheus Laboratories, Inc.	566 U.S. 66	2012	9-0	Patent Eligibility	Medical Treatment	The patent claims say nothing significantly more than apply the law, i.e., apply the natural laws that they describe and that simple additional instruction, by itself, is insufficient to transform an otherwise unpatentable claim into a patentable one.	35 U.S.C. 101	Invalidated attempt to patent natural law.
Caraco Pharmaceutical Laboratories, Ltd. v. Novo Nordisk A/S	566 U.S. 399, 132 S.Ct. 1670	April 17, 2012						
Kappos v. Hyatt	566 U.S. 431	2012						
Bowman v. Monsanto	569 U.S. 278	2013						Patent exhaustion does not permit a farmer to reproduce patented seeds through planting and harvesting without the patent holder's permission.
Gunn v. Minton	568 U.S. 251	2013						
Association for Molecular Pathology v. Myriad Genetics	569 U.S. 576	2013	9-0	Patent Eligibility	Isolation of Genetic Materials	Myriad's claims are not saved by the fact that isolating DNA from the human genome severs the chemical bonds that bind gene molecules together. The claims are not expressed in terms of chemical composition nor do they rely on the chemical changes resulting from the isolation of a particular DNA section. Consequently Myriad's patent on BRCA gene—on the BRCA gene, are invalid. But because cDNA is not naturally occurring but is instead the product of human ingenuity, we conclude that cDNA is distinguishable from not-patentable products of nature.	35 U.S.C. 101	Invalidated patents on naturally occurring DNA segments, but not on cDNA.
FTC v. Actavis, Inc.	570 U.S. 136	2013						Pay-for-delay is subject to antitrust analysis
Alice Corp. v. CLS Bank International	573 U.S. 208	2014	9-0	Patent Eligibility	Business Transaction and Hedging	Under Section 101 precedence and instruction to apply an abstract idea using a generic computer is not enough to transform that abstract idea into a patent-eligible invention. Petitioner's system and media claims are patent-ineligible, too, because they add nothing of substance to the underlying idea.	35 USC 101	Invalidated patent based on abstract idea.
Medtronic v. Boston Scientific	571 U.S. 191, 134 S. Ct. 843	2014					Declaratory Judgment Act	Burden of persuasion on infringement in declaratory judgment cases
Octane Fitness v. Icon Health & Fitness	572 U.S. 545	2014	9-0	Damages	Attorney Fees	An "exceptional" case is simply one that stands out from others because of its frivolous nature relating to the legal arguments or merits of the claim. District courts may determine exceptionalness by considering the totality of the circumstances on a case-by-case basis. The Court rejected the appellate court's "clear and convincing evidence" standard that successful patent litigants would have to establish in order to receive fees. Instead, the Court held that a simple discretionary inquiry would serve to determine whether granting attorney fees is appropriate.	35 U.S.C. 285	The lower appellate court construed the attorney fees statute in a manner that was unduly rigid. Restricting the grant of reasonable attorney fees to the prevailing party in all but two exceptions would render the statute meaningless and would contradict patent litigation norms. The appellate court's interpretation of the statute would also impermissibly encumber the district court's discretionary power to award such fees.
Highmark v. Allcare	572 U.S. 559	2014						Fee-shifting.
Limelight Networks v. Akamai Technologies	572 U.S. 915	2014	9-0	Patent Infringement	Induced Infringement	A defendant cannot be liable for inducing infringement of a patent unless some party directly infringes the patentee's legal rights. Direct infringement of a method patent in turn can only occur where all steps of the method are performed because the patentee has a legally protected interest only in the claim's set of steps as a whole. A method patent steps have not all been performed as claims by the patent unless they are all attributable to the same party.	35 U.S.C. §271(a) and (b)	Induced Infringement liability requires direct infringement. The en banc federal circuit court of appeal held that even assuming that Limelight did not directly infringe the patent, the evidence could nevertheless support a finding of inducement of infringement because the defendant who performs some steps of the patent and encourages others to perform the remaining steps may be liable for inducement even if all the steps are not attributable to the defendant. SCOTUS reverses this position.
Nautilus, Inc. v. Biosig Instruments, Inc.	572 U.S. 898	2014	9-0	Patentability Requirement	Claim Definiteness	Determining whether a patent claim is sufficiently definite must be done by evaluating the patent with the perspective of an individual learned in the relevant field, a standard that accepts a certain amount of ambiguity in the patent claim. However, because patents serve a public service function, patent claims must be definite enough to appraise the public at large as to what has or has not been patented yet. In attempting to balance these interests, the Court held that a patent is sufficiently definite when the patent taken as a whole, which includes the patent application, the U.S. Patent and Trademark Office's response, and any amendments made by the applicant, informs those learned in the relevant field of the scope of the invention with reasonable certainty.	35 U.S.C. §112	SCOTUS rejected the Court of Appeals' indefiniteness test of whether a patent claim is "amenable to construction of insolubly ambiguous" because such standard is insufficiently exacting. The asserted test is that if its claims read in light of the patent's specification and prosecution history failed to inform those skilled in the art about the scope of the invention with reasonable certainty, then a patent is invalid for indefiniteness. A definite claim takes into account the inherent limitations of languages and is meant to be understood by a PHOSITA.
Teva Pharmaceuticals USA, Inc. v. Sandoz, Inc.	574 U.S. 318	2015	7-2	Standard of Review	Claim Construction	A federal appellate court could only overturn a district court's finding of fact if those findings were determined to be "clearly erroneous." Federal Rule of Civil Procedure 52(a)(6) established this standard without any exceptions, and there was no reason to create one in this case. Because the construction of a patent claim is essentially a factual determination, it should be governed by this well-established standard. Therefore, while an appellate court may still review a lower court's construction of a claim de novo, to overturn the lower court's ruling, the appellate court must find that the lower court has made a clear error with respect to the findings of fact.	Common Law	Claim interpretation in patent, standard of review by the Federal Circuit.
Commil USA, LLC v. Cisco Systems, Inc.	575 U.S. 632	2015	6-2	Defense to Indirect Infringement	Standard of Induced Infringement	A defendant's good-faith belief that a patent is invalid is not a defense to a claim of induced infringement.	Case Law	After a trial court awarded damages to Commil, Cisco appealed and argued that the trial court erroneously instructed the jury that the standard for inducement was negligence and precluded the submission of evidence of Cisco's good-faith belief that Commil's patent was invalid. The U.S. Court of Appeals for the Federal Circuit reversed and held that the standard for induced infringement is actual knowledge or willful blindness, and therefore that a good-faith belief of patent invalidity was a defense to claims of induced infringement. SCOTUS reversed.
Kimble v. Marvel Entertainment, LLC	576 U.S. 446, 135 S. Ct. 2401	2015	6-3	Defense Based on Patent Misuse	Royalty Payments Beyond Patent Term	The precedent established in Brulotte v. Thys Co.—that a patentee cannot receive royalty payments after the patent has expired—should be upheld because there was no sufficient reason to overturn it.	Case Law	[Patent misuse] doctrine is governed by patent policy, not antitrust policy; not necessary to show anticompetive impact in misuse case
Halo Electronics, Inc. v. Pulse Electronics, Inc.	579 U.S. 93	2016	9-0	Damages	Willful Infringement Determination	The plain language of Section 284 simply stated that courts "may increase the damages up to three times the amount found or assessed." There is no language that creates the kind of test (referring to the two-part test in In re Seagate.) that the U.S. Court of Appeals for the Federal Circuit applied and precedent had established that the word "may" connotes judicial discretion. Enhanced damages serve as a sanction for egregious infringement behavior (e.g., willful, wanton, malicious, bad-faith, deliberate, consciously wrongful, flagrant, or acting like a pirate).	35 U.S.C. §284	The Seagate two-part test that required both objective and subjective bases is overruled. This case reviewed both Halo Electronics, Inc. v. Pulse Electronics, Inc. and Stryker Corp. v. Zimmer, Inc., both of which used the Seagate two-part test to determine willful infringement as the basis for deciding enhanced damages per Section 284. SCOTUS held the test overly rigid and could insulate some of worst patent infringers from liability for enhanced damages. Courts should take into account all related factors in applying Section 284.
Samsung Electronics Co. v. Apple Inc.	580 U.S. 53	2016	8-0	Damages	Design Patent Damages	For the purpose of calculating damages in a patent infringement action, the infringing "article of manufacture" may be defined as either an end product sold to a consumer or as a component of that product.	35 U.S.C. §289	The relevant text of the Patent Act encompasses both an end product sold to a consumer as well as a component of that product. The fact that a component may be incorporated into the larger end product does not place it outside the category of an "article of manufacture." Therefore, the U.S. Court of Appeals for the Federal Circuit erred in interpreting that phrase too narrowly to only refer to the end product. Under the proper reading of the phrase, an infringer will sometimes be liable for the total profit from the component of the end product, but the Court declined to determine whether that is the case.
Oil States Energy Services, LLC v. Greene's Energy Group, LLC	138 S.Ct. 1365	2018						
SAS Institute Inc. v. Iancu	138 S.Ct. 1348	2018						
WesternGeco LLC v. ION Geophysical Corp.	138 S.Ct. 2129	2018						
Helsinn Healthcare S. A. v. Teva Pharmaceuticals USA, Inc.	139 S.Ct. 628	2019						
Return Mail Inc. v. United States Postal Service	139 S.Ct. 1853	2019						
Peter v. NantKwest, Inc.	589 U.S. __, 140 S.Ct. 365	2019	9-0	Damages	Attorney fees	USPTO cannot recover the salaries of its legal personnel under section 145 of the Patent Act.	35 U.S.C § 145	Patent applicants who are unhappy with the final decision of the USPTO's Patent Trial and Appeal Board have two options to appeal: they can appeal to the Federal Circuit (which conducts a limited review of the Patent Trial and Appeal Board's decision) or sue the USPTO Director in the Eastern District of Virginia (which can consider new evidence not presented to the Patent Trial and Appeal Board). Because the second option is more expensive, litigants who choose it must pay all of the government's expenses regardless of whether they win or lose. The Supreme Court held that "all expenses" did not include the government's attorney fees.

== 2020–2029 ==
Case	Citation	Year	Vote	Classification	Subject Matter	Opinions	Statute Interpreted	Summary
2020–present
Thryv, Inc. v. Click-To-Call Technologies, LP	140 S.Ct. 1367	2020						
United States v. Arthrex, Inc.	141 S.Ct. 1970	2021						
Minerva Surgical, Inc. v. Hologic, Inc.	141 S.Ct. 2298	2021						
Amgen Inc. v. Sanofi	598 U.S. 594	2023						

== See also ==
- List of United States patent law cases
- List of United States Supreme Court copyright case law
- List of United States Supreme Court trademark case law

== Sources ==
- Lisa Larrimore Ouellette, "Supreme Court Patent Cases", Written Description
- Donald S. Chisum, Tyler T. Ochoa, Shubha Ghosh, Mary LaFrance, Understanding Intellectual Property Law (2011)
