= Carl Lundgren (disambiguation) =

Carl Lundgren was an American baseball and football player and coach.

Carl Lundgren may also refer to:

- Carl Lundgren (illustrator) (born 1947), American fantasy and science fiction illustrator, and fine artist
- Carl A. Lundgren, namesake of Ex parte Lundgren, an ex parte decision by the U.S. Patent and Trademark Office regarding process inventions
