= Ecolab, Inc. v. FMC Corp. =

Ecolab v. FMC
- Court: United States Court of Appeals for the Federal Circuit
- Full case name: Ecolab, Inc., v. FMC Corporation
- Decided: June 9, 2009
- Citations: 569 F.3d 1335; 91 U.S.P.Q.2d 1225

Case history
- Prior history: No. 05-cv-00831 (D. Minn. Feb. 22, 2008)

Court membership
- Judges sitting: Randall Ray Rader, Arthur J. Gajarsa, Timothy B. Dyk

Case opinions
- Majority: Gajarsa, joined by a unanimous panel

Ecolab v. FMC, 569 F.3d 1335 (Fed. Cir. 2009), is a decision of the United States Court of Appeals for the Federal Circuit (CAFC).

== Background ==
Ecolab and FMC Corporation sold chemical products used by beef and poultry processors to reduce pathogens, such as E. coli and salmonella, on uncooked beef and poultry. Ecolab sold Inspexx, with Inspexx 100 marketed for use on poultry and Inspexx 200 marketed for use on beef. FMC sold FMC-323, which was used on either beef or poultry. The Inspexx and FMC-323 products contained the antimicrobial compound peracetic acid, which the food processing and food service industries long used as a surface sanitizer. Additionally, the Inspexx products contained peroctanoic acid and octanoic acid, whereas FMC-323 did not.

== Patents ==
Both Ecolab and FMC obtained patents directed to the use of peracetic acid as a sanitizer in beef processing and poultry processing. In April 1993, Ecolab obtained U.S. Patent No. 5,200,189 ("the Oakes patent"), which was not asserted but was relevant prior art. The Oakes patent claimed a peroxyacid antimicrobial composition containing peracetic, peroctanoic and octanoic acids. According to the Oakes patent, the combination of the three acids "produces a synergistic effect, producing a much more potent biocide than can be obtained by using three components separately." The patent stated that the claimed sanitizing solution "can be used effectively to clean or sanitize facilities and equipment used in the food processing, food service and health care industries. In October 1993, FMC submitted a patent application that disclosed a method for sanitizing meat, specifically processed fowl, by applying peracetic acid directly to the meat. That patent issued as the '676 patent in 1997. The patent described the invention as "an extremely effective method for sanitizing a fowl carcass without unduly affecting the skin or the flesh of the bird carcass." In 1998 and 1999, Ecolab filed three patent applications directed to methods for applying peracetic acid alone or in combination with other paracides directly to meat products, including beef and poultry, to reduce microbial populations on the meat surface. Those applications issued in 2000 as U.S. Patent No. 6,010,729 ("the '729 patent"), U.S. Patent No. 6,113,963 ("the '963 patent"), and U.S. Patent No. 6,103,286 (the '286 patent").

== District Court Proceedings ==
Ecolab filed an action in the United States District Court for the District of Minnesota against FMC for infringement of the '729, '286, and '963 patents. FMC counterclaimed that Ecolab infringed FMC's '676 patent, and each party asserted its opponent's patent claims were invalid. The case was tried before a jury, and the jury found that: (1) claims 17, 19, 20 and 22 of Ecolab's '729 patent were invalid as anticipated or obvious; (2) claims 1-4 of Ecolab's '286 patent were invalid as obvious; (3) claims 7, 17, 19, 20 and 22 of Ecolab's '963 patent were invalid as anticipated or obvious; (4) the '676 patent claims asserted by FMC are not invalid; (5) FMC willfully infringed claim 7 of the '729 patent and claims 25, 27 and 28 of the '963 patent; (6) Ecolab infringed claims 1, 5, 6, and 7 of FMC's '676 patent; and (7) neither party induced infringement of any claims. The jury awarded reasonable royalty damages to both parties, and the district court entered judgment on the jury's verdict.

Both Ecolab and FMC filed post trial-motions. Ecolab filed motions for JMOL, a permanent injunction, enhanced damages, attorney fees, prejudgment and post-judgment interest, an accounting, and amendment of the judgment. FMC filed various JMOL and new trial motions and a motion to alter the judgment that included a request for a permanent injunction, prejudgment and post-judgment interest, and an accounting. The district court denied all post-trial motions in summary form and without explanation. Ecolab and FMC appealed to the Court of Appeals for the Federal Circuit.

== Federal Circuit ==
Ecolab appeals and FMC cross appealed the district court's denial of their respective JMOL motions. Ecolab further asserted the district court erred by denying its motions for a permanent injunction, enhanced damages, attorney fees, interest, and an accounting. FMC further asserted the district court erred by misconstruing a claim term, by imposing an improper damages award, and by denying its requests for a permanent injection, prejudgment interest, and an accounting.

== The JMOL Motions ==
Both Ecolab and FMC asserted that the district court erred by denying their respective JMOL motions. Specifically, Ecolab contended the district court should have granted JMOL that Ecolab did not infringe the '676 patent claims and that FMC induced infringement of Ecolab's patent claims. FMC contended the district court should have granted JMOL that claim 7 of the '729 patent and claims 25-28 of the '963 patent are invalid as anticipated or obvious, that Ecolab induced infringement of FMC's patent claims, and that FMC did not willfully infringe Ecolab's patent claims.

=== Ecolab's Motion for JMOL of Noninfringement ===
At the district court, the jury found Ecolab infringed claims 1, 5, 6 and 7 of FMC's '676 patent, all of which included the following:

A method for sanitizing fowl that has been killed, plucked and eviscerated, comprising contacting the fowl with an aqueous solution, which consists essentially of a sanitizing concentration of at least a 100 ppm peracetic acid... and maintaining that contact for a time sufficient to sanitize the fowl without adversely affecting the fowl.

Ecolab argued that it was entitled to JMOL of noninfringement for two reasons. First, Ecolab argued that when the '676 patent claims were properly construed in light of FMC's prosecution history disclaimer, Inspexx did not infringe because the patent claims cover only solutions containing peracetic acid as the sole antimicrobial agent. Second, Ecolab argued it did not infringe because Inspexx did not "sanitize" meat products under the patent's definition of that term.

Prosecution History Disclaimer.

Ecolab first argued that, during prosecution, FMC disclaimed compositions containing multiple antimicrobial agents, and since Inspexx contained three antimicrobial agents, Inspexx did not infringe the '676 patent as a matter of law.

FMC contended that its prosecution statements could not reasonably be interpreted as disclaimers when they were properly read in the context of the entire patent disclosure and prosecution history.
