= Finjan, Inc. v. Secure Computing Corp. =

- Court: United States Court of Appeals for the Federal Circuit
- Full case name: Finjan, Inc. (formerly Finjan Software, Ltd.), Plaintiff-Cross Appellant, v. Secure Computing Corporation, Cyberguard Corporation, and Webwasher AG, Defendant-Appellant and Does 1 through 100, Defendants.
- Decided: November 4 2010
- Citations: 626 F.3d 1197; 97 U.S.P.Q.2d 1161

Case history
- Prior history: 06-CV-0369 (D. Dela. (2008))

Holding
- Infringement on the asserted "system" and "storage medium" claims were affirmed, but infringement on the asserted "method" claims was reversed. The damage award was not only affirmed, but also remanded for extra damage determination for period between the post-judgment and pre-injunction.

Court membership
- Judges sitting: Newman, Gajarsa, and Linn

Case opinions
- Majority: Linn

Finjan, Inc. v. Secure Computing Corp., 626 F.3d 1197 (2010), was a patent infringement case by the United States Court of Appeals for the Federal Circuit involving "proactive scanning" technology for computer security. The Federal Circuit made a mixed decision after hearing the appeals from both sides. In terms of infringement, the Federal Circuit affirmed Secure Computing's infringement on Finjan's system and storage medium patent claims but reversed the infringement on Finjan's method claim. In terms of damage award, the Federal Circuit not only affirmed the previous $9.18 million award by the United States District Court for the District of Delaware, but also remanded for the district court to assess the extra damages between the post-judgement and pre-injunction period.

== Background ==
=== Brief history in the Lower Court ===
Finjan, Inc.("Finjan"), a company providing enterprise web security solutions, sued Secure Computing Corp. (acquired by McAfee in 2008), Cyberguard Corp., and Webwasher AG (collectively, "Secure") in the United States District Court for the District of Delaware for infringement of three U.S. patents (U.S. Patents No. 6,092,194, No. 6,804,780, and No. 7,058,822). Defendants counterclaimed against Finjan for infringement of two U.S. Patents (No. 6,357,010 and No. 7,185,361). In the decisions, the jury concluded that all of the patents mentioned above were valid and Finjan did not infringe upon the defendants' patents. The defendants, however, infringed on all of the asserted patent claims by Finjan. The district court awarded $9.18 million enhanced damages to Finjan under 35 U.S.C. § 284, and imposed a permanent injunction against the defendants.

After the verdict in the lower court, the defendants appealed both infringement and damages. Finjan, on the other hand, cross-appealed only the district court's damage ruling, claiming that additional damages should be awarded for the peiord between post-judgment and pre-injunction.

=== Patents and claims from Finjan ===
In this case, Finjan owned three patents related to proactive scanning technique. They were used to detect and defeat previously unknown, Internet-based threats to computers. The brief descriptions of each patent are listed below.

- '194 Patent: It included method claims, system claims and storage medium claims that can comprising the steps of receiving, comparing Downloadable and preventing execution of the Downloadable in order to detect and prevent threats.
- '780 Patent: it had the same title as the '194 patent and also included method, system and storage medium claims. This patent covered "caching" or identifying previously encountered downloadable files.
- '822 Patent: it included both method and system claims and addressed "sandboxing" potentially dangerous downloadables with protective code.

=== Undisputed facts ===
Defendants sold three accused computer security products: a "Webwasher" software download, a "Webwasher" hardware appliance and a "Cyberguard TSP" hardware appliance. All three products contained source code for eight different software modules. Three of those modules — Anti-Virus, Anti-Malware, and Content Protection — offered proactive scanning functionality, which was related to the patents held by Finjan. The eight modules were "locked" when the three products were sold, requiring a customer to purchase a separate key to activate each individual module. Therefore, a customer who purchased an accused product can activate all, some, or none of the eight modules at different cost.

== Opinions of the Federal Court ==
=== On infringement ===
==== System and storage medium claims ====
Secure Computing argued that they did not directly infringe Finjan's patents because the software they sold to customers were "locked," meaning that none of the infringing features were functional until the customers "purchased keys and unlocked" the software components. This implied that the customers were the direct infringers, and the defendants were indirect infringers. To prove their non-infringement theory, the defendants cited the Southwest Software, Inc. v. Harlequin Inc. case for the proposition that "locked [computer] code" cannot infringe.

However, the Federal Circuit pointed out these two cases were actually different. The claim at that case was a method claim and it required performance of each claimed step in order to trigger infringement. The claims held by Finjan's '194 and '780 patent were "system" and "storage medium" claims, which were considered as apparatus claims and did not require performance of any method steps. Merely "literal" presence of the software or binary code in the accused product is enough for infringement to occur.

By relying on the ruling of another similar case Fantasy Sports Props v. Sportsline.com Inc., in which the customers also had to configure and activate features in the software, the Federal Circuit concluded that inactive software features could still have direct infringement on apparatus claims.

==== Method claims ====
In addition to the system and storage medium claims, Finjan also asserted method claims from each of the three patents in suit. Based on the standard established in previous case Lucent Technologies v. Gateway, Inc., a person must have practiced all steps of the claimed method to infringe a method claim."

In this case, the only two pieces of performance evidence Finjan had was that an Webwasher AG's engineer testified a debug file showing a depiction of proactive scanning and that same debug file showed performance of the claimed steps. Based on a single debug file, Finjan showed at most that Webwasher AG performed proactive scanning on one occasion during testing. Since Finjan could not show that all steps of the claimed methods of their asserted patents were practiced in the United States, the court reversed the previous opinion from the district court and ruled that Secure Computing was not liable for patent infringement on Finjan's method claims in these three asserted patents.

==== Term construction ====
Secure Computing argued that a new trial was required because the district court failed to construe the term "addressed to a client" from each asserted claim of the '194 patent, similar as what happened in the case O2 Micro International Ltd. v. Beyond Innovation Technology Co..

The Federal Circuit explained that, rather than failing to resolve the parties' quarrel all together by construing the term in dispute, the district court just rejected Secure Computing's construction of the claim term. Unlike the O2 Micro case, there were no errors made on term construction by the district court in this case. What Defendants attempted to do is just to resurrect a claim construction that was already rejected by the district court. Therefore, Secure Computing's request for a new trial was rejected.

=== On damages ===
==== Royalty base ====
The defendants challenged that: 1) the jury should calculate the damage based on their unlocked products value, instead of using their full sale value; and 2) the jury erroneously included sales to the U.S. government when calculating royalty base.

For the first challenge, the Federal Circuit was persuaded by Finjan's waiver and explained that since Secure Computing did not raise this argument in its Judgment as a matter of law (JMOL) motion following the trial, Secure Computing may not raise these arguments for the first time on appeal, based on previous case Srein v. Frankford Trust Co.. Because this argument was waived, the Federal Circuit needed not address this challenge.

For the second challenge, the Federal Circuit found that the district court had in fact instructed the jury at trial that sales to the United States Government should not be included in any damages calculation. Besides, the damage number the jury awarded was also different from Finjan's calculation. Moreover, the record showed that only a very small portion of the damage award was from sales to the United States. Therefore, the Federal Circuit decided that no new trial was necessary for the dispute around royalty base.

==== Royalty rates ====
The defendants argued that jury's royalty percentages calculation lacked support under the Georgia-Pacific factors.

1. Secure Computing claimed that Finjan should rely its calculation on Secure's profits for the accused products, instead of its company-wide profits. The Federal Circuit concluded that substantial evidence supported the royalty rates calculation because the company-wide gross profit margin was very close to the gross margin for the accused products.

2. Secure Computing argued that the jury ignored the fact that not all customers enabled proactive scanning modules. If no users activated modules containing proactive scanning, no revenue for that product was attributable to the Finjan's patented invention. The Federal Circuit disagreed with Secure Computing and explained that the accused direct infringers were Defendants, not their customers. Because Defendants included proactive scanning on every accused product, such function encompassed all of Secure Computing's sales, regardless of customer activation. For example, Secure Computing obtained advertising value from those products even customers did not unlock the proactive scanning modules.

3. Secure Computing disagreed with the $9.18 million damage amount for infringement of three patents by identifying the fact that Microsoft acquired a license to Finjan's complete patent portfolio for only $8 million. The Federal Circuit emphasized that use of past patent licenses must account for differences in the technologies and economic circumstances. In this case, Finjan did not compete with Microsoft but did compete with Secure, and Finjan also received significant intangible value from Microsoft's endorsements of Finjan.

In sum, The court contended that the royalty percentages were made with substantial evidence and based on expert's opinion. As a result, the Federal Circuit affirmed the denial of defendant's motions for JMOL or new trial on damages.

=== On Finjan's cross-appeal on damages ===
Even though the district court granted Finjan additional damages by multiplying the jury's royalty rates against previously uncalculated sales, the period was limited "to only those additional infringing sales that occurred up until the date of entry of the judgment in this case." Finjan therefore claimed entitlement to damages for the 17-month period between the entry of the judge (March 28, 2008) and the injunction (August 28, 2009).

The court agreed and remanded for the district court to determine appropriate damages for the above mentioned period, which resulted in a more than $13.7 million damage totally.

== Subsequent development ==
=== Impact ===
This case involved system and computer-readable medium (Beauregard) claims as well as method (Bilski) claims. It was seen as a zenith in the winning of Beauregard claims where the Federal Circuit held that not only was it okay for a computer-readable medium with instructions on it to be enforced, but that the code needn't even be active in order to trigger infringement.

On the other hand, the success of Beauregard claims as compared to the failure of Bilski claims in this case highlighted why Beauregard claims may be more desirable in a patent applications.

=== Subsequent cases ===
Several later patent infringement cases had cited this case from different perspectives.

Versata Software, Inc. v. SAP America, Inc. and Bally Technologies, Inc v. Business Intelligence Systems Solutions, Inc. adopted the opinion that "inactive" program could still infringe apparatus claims.

In Brocade Communications Systems, Inc. and Foundry Networks, LLC., criteria on deciding method claim infringement were based this case.

In Cisco Systems, Inc., v. Teleconference Systems, LLC et al., the court made the same argument in that the court was not obligated to construe the term if it rejected one party's proposed construction.

The royalty calculation was referred in the case of Whitserve, LLC v. Computer Packages, Inc.

== See also ==
- United States Patent and Trademark Office
- List of patent claim types
- Patent infringement
- Software patent
