= Sakraida v. Ag Pro Inc. =

Sakraida v. Ag Pro
- Supreme Court of the United States

Argued March 3, 1976 Decided April 20, 1976
- Full case name: Bernard A. Sakraida, Petitioner, v. AG Pro Incorporated
- Citations: 425 U.S. 273 (more) 96 S. Ct. 1532; 47 L. Ed. 2d 784; 1976 U.S. LEXIS 146; 189 U.S.P.Q. (BNA) 449

Case history
- Subsequent: Rehearing Denied June 21, 1976

Holding
- The Court held a patent directed to a combination of old elements as invalid for obviousness.

Court membership
- Chief Justice Warren E. Burger Associate Justices William J. Brennan Jr. · Potter Stewart; Byron White · Thurgood Marshall; Harry Blackmun · Lewis F. Powell Jr. William Rehnquist · John P. Stevens

Case opinion
- Majority: Brennan, joined unanimously

Sakraida v. Ag Pro Inc., 425 U.S. 273 (1976), was a unanimous 1976 Supreme Court decision holding a claimed invention obvious because it "simply arranges old elements with each performing the same function it had been known to perform, although perhaps producing a more striking result than in previous combinations."

== Background ==
The patent in this case covered "a water flush system to remove cow manure from the floor of a dairy barn." The system was a combination of conventional, well-known elements, using flowing water to flush cow manure from a barn. "Systems using flowing water to clean animal wastes from barn floors have been familiar on dairy farms since ancient times." The Court cited the fifth labor of Hercules (cleaning the Augean stables) as an example. It was conceded that each element of the claimed combination was found in the prior art. "The only claimed inventive feature of the [patented] combination of old elements is the provision for abrupt release of the water from the tanks or pools directly onto the barn floor, which causes the flow of a sheet of water that washes all animal waste into drains within minutes and requires no supplemental hand labor."

== Ruling of Supreme Court ==
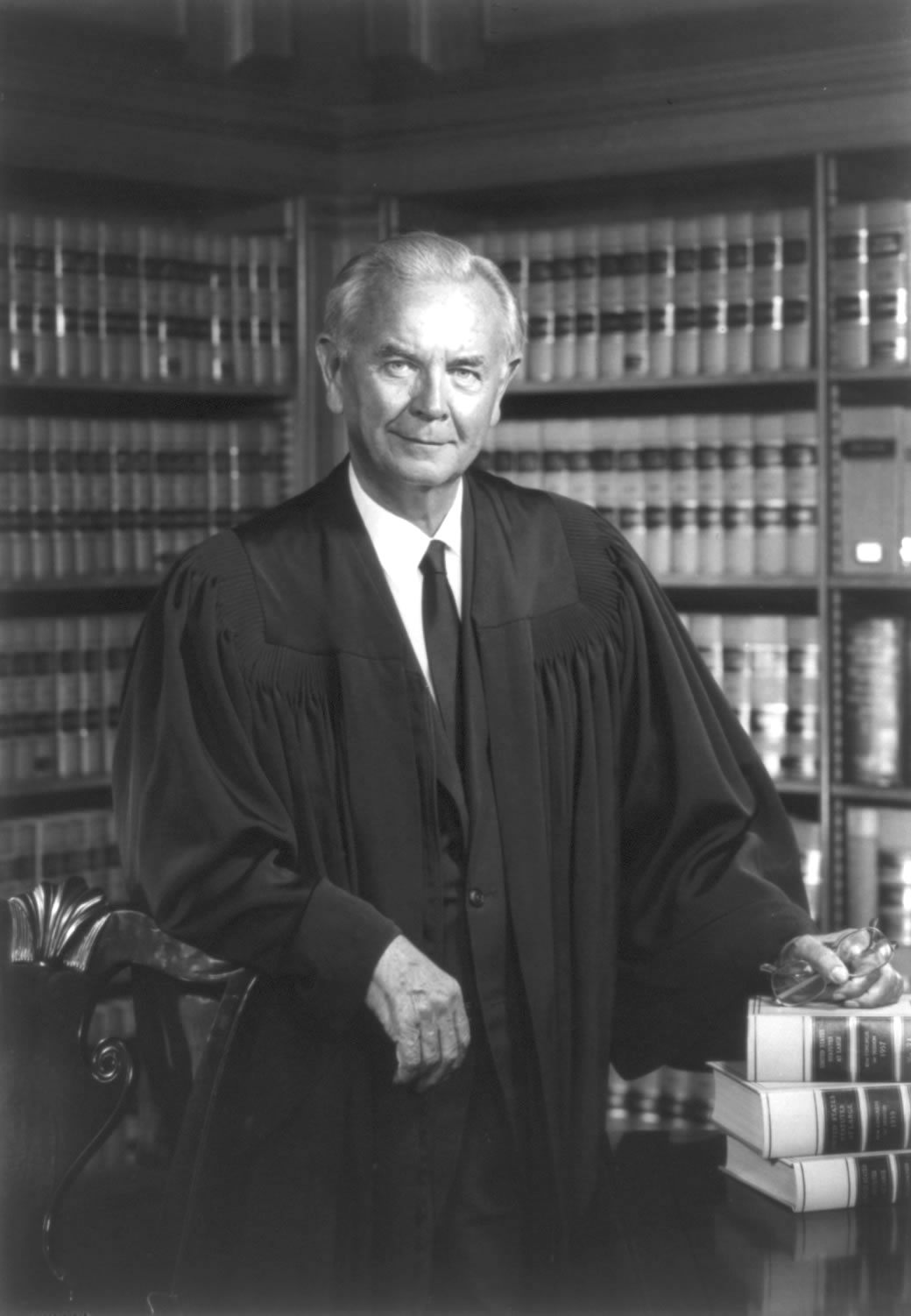
Justice Brennan

Speaking for a unanimous Court, Justice William J. Brennan held that the claimed invention was obvious under the standards set out in prior Supreme Court decisions. Not only were each of the claimed elements old and well known, but what the inventor said was "the essence of the patent, to-wit, the manure flush system, was old, various means for flushing manure from dairy barns having been used long before the filing of the application." Moreover, "there is no change in the respective functions of the elements of the combination; this particular use of the assembly of old elements would be obvious to any person skilled in the art of mechanical application."

The Court concluded that although "doubtless a matter of great convenience, producing a desired result in a cheaper and faster way, and enjoying commercial success," the claimed system "did not produce a new or different function" and therefore was not patentable.

== Commentary ==
One commentator expressed extreme disappointment with this decision and the trend of Supreme Court patent decisions away from a hoped-for "brief exultant moment" of decisions favorable to patenting:

Sakraida coupled with the Black Rock decision, will send the conceptual clarity of inventors, lawyers, and judges, plummeting into the confusion that was earlier prevalent. Section 103 and the Trilogy, which for a brief exultant moment cleared away the debris produced by the preexisting case law, are again being grossly misinterpreted by a bar seemingly cemented into its pre-1952 habits. All persons involved should become more familiar with the fine distinctions produced in this area and recognize the intent of the United States Congress when its enacted Section 103 into law. If the courts, in particular the Supreme Court, do not have any "in house" expertise in the specialized areas of engineering, science, and chemistry, they should make use of the many experts available and receive full and knowledgeable explanations of any baffling intricacies.

Commentator Hal Wegner asserted that "the Federal Circuit sub silentio but clearly repudiated the Supreme Court’s holding in Sakraida just seven years after it was decided, in the Federal Circuit's decision in Stratoflex, Inc. v. Aeroquip Corp. In the same vein, a much used patent law casebook said in 2003 that "in its early decisions, the Federal Circuit essentially repudiated the holding[]" of Sakraida.

Chris Cotropia maintained that in its 2007 decision in KSR International Co. v. Teleflex Inc., the Supreme Court "reaffirmed and further explained its holding[]" in Sakraida, while turning back the Federal Circuit's rejection and opposition to that precedent.
