= Zenith Radio Corp. v. Hazeltine Research, Inc. =

Zenith Radio Corp. v. Hazeltine Research Inc.
- Supreme Court of the United States

Argued November 10, 1970 Decided February 24, 1971
- Full case name: Zenith Radio Corporation v. Hazeltine Research, Inc.
- Citations: 401 U.S. 321 (more) 91 S. Ct. 795; 28 L. Ed. 2d 77; 1971 U.S. LEXIS 153

Case history
- Prior: 395 U.S. 100 (1969)
- Subsequent: None

Holding
- Zenith Radio's suit for recovery was not barred by statute of limitations because the damages it received were previously uncertain and speculative.

Court membership
- Chief Justice Warren E. Burger Associate Justices Hugo Black · William O. Douglas; John M. Harlan II · William J. Brennan Jr. Potter Stewart · Byron White; Thurgood Marshall · Harry Blackmun

Case opinions
- Majority: White, joined by unanimous
- Concurrence: Harlan, joined by Stewart

Zenith Radio Corp. v. Hazeltine Research, Inc. is the caption of several United States Supreme Court patent–related decisions, the most significant of which is a 1969 patent–antitrust and patent–misuse decision concerning the levying of patent royalties on unpatented products.

== 1969 Case ==
In Zenith Radio Corp. v. Hazeltine Research, Inc., 395 U.S. 100 (1969), Hazeltine had required an unwilling Zenith to pay a percentage of all its sales of electronic equipment in order to be granted a license under Hazeltine's patents. The Supreme Court held that requiring a patent licensee to pay a percentage of its total patented and non-patented product sales as a condition of the license was misuse. On the other hand, the Court said, if the parties adopted this method of determining royalties ("total–sales royalties") without coercion and for mutual convenience, such as because of the difficulty in making a precise accounting, then the expedient was not misuse.

Zenith had sued Hazeltine for a declaration of misuse and treble antitrust damages. It was therefore necessary for the Court to determine whether coercive total–sales royalties was not only misuse but a basis for antitrust damages as well. The Court ruled that for Hazeltine to be liable for antitrust treble damages, the other requirements of such an action must be met—such as sufficient anti-competitive impact. This holding reaffirmed a line of Supreme Court patent–misuse decisions holding that the competitive impact of a restrictive practice may fall short of an antitrust violation and nonetheless be misuse.

== 1971 Case ==
The case was brought to the Supreme Court again in 1971. In Zenith Radio Corp. v. Hazeltine Research, Inc., the Supreme Court reversed the Seventh Circuit's remand decision in the preceding 1969 case. In its decision on remand, the district court had found an antitrust violation—participating in foreign patent pools that excluded Zenith from selling in the U.S. market—and awarded damages to Zenith. The district court rejected a statute of limitations defense. On appeal to the Seventh Circuit, it reversed on statute of limitations grounds; it remanded for a reduction of the award because part of the damages resulted from conduct that occurred outside the statute of limitations. The Supreme Court reversed the Seventh Circuit, instructing it to reinstate the district court judgment. The Supreme Court held that the statute of limitations had been tolled by a government suit, even though Zenith was not involved in that suit and Hazeltine was not named as a defendant co–conspirator.

In establishing precedent, the Court held that Zenith was still entitled to damages for the lasting and future effects of conspiratorial conduct, even if the statute of limitations were not tolled. "Generally, a cause of action accrues and the statute begins to run when a defendant commits an act that injures a plaintiff's business., that is, "each time a plaintiff is injured by an act of the defendants a cause of action accrues to him to recover the damages caused by that act and that, as to those damages, the statute of limitations runs from the commission of the act." However, this applies only to the damages caused immediately. When there are future injuries "that might arise from the conduct sued on are unrecoverable if the fact of their accrual is speculative or their amount and nature unprovable," then the statute does not begin to run on the injuries until they occur and can be ascertained. Accordingly, the statute of limitations did not bar the recovery Zenith sought.
