= Sinclair & Carroll Co. v. Interchemical Corp. =

Sinclair & Carroll v. Interchemical
- Supreme Court of the United States

Argued April 5, 1945 Decided May 21, 1945
- Full case name: Sinclair & Corroll Co, Inc., v. Interchemical Corporation
- Citations: 325 U.S. 327 (more) 65 S. Ct. 1143; 89 L. Ed. 1644; 1945 U.S. LEXIS 2807; 65 U.S.P.Q. (BNA) 297

Holding
- Patent invalid for lack of inventiveness.

Court membership
- Chief Justice Harlan F. Stone Associate Justices Owen Roberts · Hugo Black; Stanley F. Reed · Felix Frankfurter; William O. Douglas · Frank Murphy; Robert H. Jackson · Wiley B. Rutledge

Case opinions
- Majority: Jackson, joined by Stone, Roberts, Reed, Frankfurter, Murphy, Rutledge
- Concurrence: Black
- Concurrence: Douglas

Sinclair & Carroll v. Interchemical, 325 U.S. 327 (1945), is a United States Supreme Court decision that held a patent invalid for lack of inventiveness.

== Background ==
Interchemical Corporation asserted that inks made by Sinclair & Carroll Co. infringed U.S. Patent No. 2,087,190 to Albert E. Gessler (assigned to Interchemical Corporation). The District Court held the Gessler patent invalid as anticipated by the prior art. The Circuit Court reversed, holding the patent valid and infringed.

The Gessler patent claims to an ink that does not dry at room temperature but which will dry almostly instantly upon the application of heat. The ink has utility in the printing of magazines and other materials that use smooth non-absorbent paper, and it or similar inks were claimed to have been used in The New Yorker, Collier's and The Saturday Evening Post. Such publications previously required more time for printing since the reverse side of the paper could not be printed until the first side was dry.

Prior to Gessler, many efforts were made to eliminate this delay. The problem was complicated by the fact that the printing presses included a long series of rollers to spread out the ink. Hence, when ink with volatile components were used, they would dry on the rollers before they got to the type. And, if nonvolatile inks were used, they would not dry except by slow oxidation.

Gessler's ink combined the qualities of an ink which does not dry on the rollers and one which dries quickly after printing when heat is applied. This characteristic of the ink resulted from the solvent being relatively non-volatile at ordinary room temperature but highly volatile at a temperature of 150 C. The inks containing these solvents enabled magazines to be printed on high-speed rotary presses furnished with heating devices, without interruption for drying.

In 1930, Gessler was asked to make an odorless ink, and he selected from a catalog of a chemical manufacturer three solvents which the catalog indicated to be relatively odorless. He tried inks made with each of the compounds as a solvent and decided that butyl carbitol was the most satisfactory, since it did not dry while on the rollers, at ordinary temperatures. The company which had requested the odorless ink, however, found that it was unsatisfactory for other reasons and, after some further effort, Gessler stopped trying to solve that problem.

Sometime in 1932, however, the same company asked Gessler whether he could supply them with an ink that would be dry after being put over a heating device. Gessler's answered that one of those inks he previously made would do that. Once Gessler learned that steam-heated rollers were used on printing presses, then he knew that the inks would dry almost instantaneously.

== Opinion of the Court ==
According to the Court, an essential requirement for validity of a patent is that the "subject matter display invention, more ingenuity than the work of a mechanic skilled in the art". The court held that the Gessler patent was not invention.

The Court found that the Gessler patent was "not the product of long and difficult experimentation," and that "reading a list and selecting a known compound to meet known requirements is not more ingenious than selecting the last piece to put into the last opening in a jig-saw puzzle."
