= Ex parte Bowman =

Ex Parte Bowman 61 U.S.P.Q.2d 1669 (Bd. Pat. App. & Int. 2001) was a decision by the U.S. Board of Patent Appeals and Interferences which asserted that in order to be patent-eligible, a process had to involve or promote the technological arts. This decision was overruled by the Board's subsequent Ex Parte Lundgren decision, but the Board's and then the Federal Circuit's In re Bilski opinion then superseded Lundgren. In re Bilski, however, rejects use of "not in the technological arts" as a basis for a rejection, although it seems to accept the concept when differently named. Bilski was affirmed by the Supreme Court in Bilski v. Kappos.

== See also ==
- Business method patent
- Diamond v. Diehr
- Freeman-Walter-Abele Test
- State Street Bank v. Signature Financial Group
- Machine-or-transformation test
