= Ex parte Quayle =

Ex parte Quayle, 25 USPQ 74, 1935 C.D. 11; 453 O.G. 213 (Comm'r Pat. 1935) is a United States patent law decision. When a patent application is in condition for allowance, prosecution on the merits is closed. At this time, further amendments of the patent application are allowed only to correct formal objections, which typically include minor and obvious mistakes. The presence of such formal objections precludes the full closing of prosecution; therefore, in these situations, the United States Patent and Trademark Office (USPTO) issues an Ex parte Quayle Office action requesting the applicant to correct the formal objections.

An Ex parte Quayle action has a shortened statutory period for reply that expires two months from the mailing date of the action. This period can be extended by four additional months for up to a total period for reply of six months (with proper extensions and fees).

== See also ==
- United States patent law
