= Ariad Pharmaceuticals, Inc. v. Eli Lilly & Co. =

- Court: United States Court of Appeals for the Federal Circuit
- Full case name: Ariad Pharmaceuticals, Inc. v. Eli Lilly & Co.
- Decided: March 22, 2010
- Citations: Panel Opinion: 560 F.3d 1366; 90 U.S.P.Q.2d 1549 (Fed. Cir. 2009); En banc Opinion: 598 F.3d 1336; 94 U.S.P.Q.2d 1161

Case history
- Prior history: 529 F. Supp. 2d 106 (D. Mass. 2007)

Court membership
- Judges sitting: Paul Redmond Michel, Alan David Lourie, Pauline Newman, Haldane Robert Mayer, William Curtis Bryson, Arthur J. Gajarsa, Timothy B. Dyk, Sharon Prost, Kimberly Ann Moore, Randall Ray Rader, Richard Linn

Case opinions
- Majority: Panel: Moore, joined by Prost, Linn
- Majority: En banc: Lourie, joined by Michel, Newman, Mayer, Bryson, Gajarsa, Dyk, Prost, Moore
- Concurrence: Panel:Linn
- Concurrence: En banc: Newman
- Concurrence: En banc: Gajarsa
- Concur/dissent: En banc: Rader, joined by Linn
- Concur/dissent: En banc: Linn, joined by Rader

Ariad Pharmaceuticals et al. v. Eli Lilly and Company, 598 F.3d 1336 (Fed. Cir. 2010) (en banc), is a United States court case regarding accusations of infringement by Eli Lilly on U.S. patent 6,410,516 held by ARIAD Pharmaceuticals. The Federal Circuit ruled en banc to invalidate the patent for a lack of sufficient description of the invention. Amici briefing before the en banc panel was intensive, with 26 separate briefs filed, and the final decision has been heavily discussed by legal commentators. Its ultimate impact on biotechnology patents remains to be determined.

== The '516 patent at issue ==
The '516 patent was licensed by Ariad from Massachusetts Institute of Technology (MIT), Harvard, and the Whitehead Institute. Nuclear factor-kappa B (NF-kappaB) is a transcription factor that plays a critical role in many cell functions including embryonic and neuronal development, cell proliferation, apoptosis, and immune responses to infection and inflammation. Defendant Lilly was manufacturing two drugs accused of infringing the '516 patent: Evista® for the treatment of osteoporosis and prevention of breast cancer, and Xigris® for the treatment of sepsis.

On May 4, 2006, Lilly was ordered to pay ~$65 million in back royalties, and 2.3% royalties on future sales of the drugs Evista and Xigris which inhibit NF-κB production.

The lower court's opinion was controversial because many commentators felt that the scope of Ariad's patent's claims went far beyond what was covered or enabled in the patent itself. As a transcription factor, NF-κB regulates over 300 genes, and NF-κB-controlled pathways are relevant to many human diseases. As many as 200 marketed drugs have mechanisms of action that may affect the NF-κB pathway. Lilly's defense is termed by some as the "Lilly written description" doctrine, as it entails the need for an extremely detailed and precise description of the action embodiment of the invention itself.

== Federal Circuit three-member panel appellate ruling for Eli Lilly ==
On appeal, a three-member panel of the Federal Circuit overturned the lower court ruling, and invalidated the '516 patent. The basis of the ruling was that the '516 patent did not have a sufficient "written description" of the patented invention.

== Federal Circuit's en banc hearing again holds for Eli Lilly ==
Ariad moved for a rehearing en banc'. The en banc Federal Circuit order certified two narrow questions to be resolved by the appeal:

- Whether 35 U.S.C. Sec, 112, paragraph 1, contains a written description requirement separate from an enablement requirement?
- If a separate written description requirement is set forth in the statute, what is the scope and purpose of the requirement?

On 3 April 2009, the United States Court of Appeals for the Federal Circuit again approved throwing out the verdict against defendant Eli Lilly. Rather than address whether Eli Lilly had infringed the patent, the Federal Circuit ruled that the Ariad patent was invalid. Essentially, the court ruled that the patent failed to adequately describe the invention in its patent or explain how others could replicate its work. Judge Rader in dissent felt that a lack of a more traditional patent concept, enablement, would be sufficient to invalidate the patent. In Judge Rader's view, the use of traditional tests to determine whether a patent is enabled by its descriptions solved the appellate court's problematic analysis more definitively and predictably. The impact of the Ariad ruling thus is in keeping with earlier Federal Circuit opinions on written descriptions, but ultimately its effect on biotechnology patents remains unclear.
