= Arizona Cartridge Remanufacturers Ass'n Inc. v. Lexmark International Inc. =

2005 US appeals court decision

- Court: United States Court of Appeals for the Ninth Circuit
- Full case name: Arizona Cartridge Remanufacturers Association Inc., an Arizona not-for-profit corporation, individually, and on behalf of its members and the general public, v. Lexmark International Inc., a Delaware corporation
- Argued: March 17, 2005
- Decided: August 30, 2005
- Citations: 421 F.3d 981; 77 U.S.P.Q.2d 1995; 05 Cal. Daily Op. Serv. 7823; 05 Daily Journal D.A.R. 10,640

Case history
- Prior history: 290 F. Supp. 2d 1034 (N.D. Cal. 2003)

Court membership
- Judges sitting: Sidney Runyan Thomas, Raymond C. Fisher, James L. Robart (W.D. Wash.)

Case opinions
- Majority: Fisher, joined by a unanimous court

Arizona Cartridge Remanufacturers Association Inc. v. Lexmark International Inc., 421 F.3d 981 (9th Cir. 2005) was a decision by the United States Court of Appeals for the Ninth Circuit which ruled that an End User License Agreement on a physical box can be binding on consumers who signal their acceptance of the license agreement by opening the box.

== Background ==
Over the lifetime of modern computer printers, the cost of the ink cartridges can in typical usage be much more than the printer itself. Consumers have a motivation to refill their own cartridges either themselves or through third parties. Lexmark produced "Prebate" ink cartridges with a purchase contract that states that in exchange for purchasing the ink cartridge at a lower price, the consumer agrees not to tamper with the cartridge, and to return it to Lexmark for refurbishing and repackaging. Arizona Cartridge Remanufacturers Association Inc. (ACRA), a consumer group, brought suit that alleges it was deceptive for Lexmark to claim that its restriction was enforceable. Lexmark has since renamed the Prebate cartridges to Lexmark Return Program Cartridges.

== Ruling ==
The appeals court upheld the district court's finding that "ACRA ha[d] not offered evidence that Lexmark's advertisements constitute[d] deceptive or unfair business practices" and granted summary judgment in favor of Lexmark. The court found that ACRA failed to show that Lexmark's post-sale restriction had no legal basis, and that ACRA's claim that "Lexmark want[ed] consumers to believe that the Prebate discount reflect[ed] the benefit that accrue[d] to Lexmark by getting an empty cartridge back" was not supported by the record. In addition, the appeals court affirmed the district court's finding that "Lexmark could restrict the post-sale use of its patented cartridge," finding that "ACRA ha[d] not attempted to show that the use of the lock-out chip [...] impermissibly exceed[ed] the patent grant to produce anticompetitive effects."

== Conclusion ==
It is sometimes overlooked that this ruling only applies to Lexmark's "Prebate" ink cartridges, where the contract states that in exchange for purchasing the ink cartridge at a lower price, the consumer agrees to not tamper with the cartridge and return it to Lexmark for refurbishing and repackaging. The Electronic Frontier Foundation has concerns that this decision will allow patent owners to "impose over-reaching restrictions on formerly permitted post-sale uses".

== See also ==
- Bauer & Cie. v. O'Donnell
- Defective by Design
- Walled garden (technology)
- Digger gold
- Retrocomputing
