= Anderson's-Black Rock, Inc. v. Pavement Salvage Co. =

- Supreme Court of the United States

Argued November 10, 1969 Decided December 8, 1969
- Full case name: Anderson's-Black Rock, Inc. v. Pavement Salvage Co., Inc.
- Citations: 396 U.S. 57 (more) 90 S. Ct. 305; 24 L. Ed. 2d 258; 1969 U.S. LEXIS 3322; 163 U.S.P.Q. (BNA) 673

Case history
- Prior: Pavement Salvage Co. v. Anderson's-Black Rock, Inc., 308 F. Supp. 941 (S.D.W. Va. 1967); reversed, 404 F.2d 450 (4th Cir. 1968); cert. granted, 394 U.S. 916 (1969).

Holding
- When old elements are combined in a way such that they do not interact in a novel, unobvious way, then the resulting combination is obvious and therefore unpatentable.

Court membership
- Chief Justice Warren E. Burger Associate Justices Hugo Black · William O. Douglas; John M. Harlan II · William J. Brennan Jr. Potter Stewart · Byron White; Thurgood Marshall

Case opinion
- Majority: Douglas, joined by Black, Harlan, Brennan, Stewart, White, Marshall
- Burger took no part in the consideration or decision of the case.

Anderson's-Black Rock, Inc. v. Pavement Salvage Co., 396 U.S. 57 (1969), is a 1969 decision of the United States Supreme Court on the legal standard governing the obviousness of claimed inventions. It stands for the proposition that, when old elements are combined in a way such that they do not interact in a novel, unobvious way, then the resulting combination is obvious and therefore unpatentable.

== Background ==
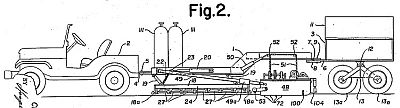
Drawing of the machine patented in this case

The patent sought to solve a problem in paving asphalt roads—the joint between the new section and old, cold sections tends to bond poorly. Previously, one machine spread and shaped the new deposit of asphalt and a second machine contained a radiant-heat burner, which softened cold asphalt. The claimed invention combined on one machine chassis the spreading and shaping equipment along with a radiant-heat burner.

The defendant highway constructor's alleged infringement resulted from its placing of a radiant-heat burner on the front of a standard paving machine. This allowed "its machine to perform the same functions with the same basic elements as those described in [the] patent."

== Proceedings in lower courts ==
=== District court ruling ===
The patent owner, Pavement Salvage Company, sued the highway constructor, Anderson's-Black Rock, in the United States District Court at Charleston, West Virginia. The district court held the claimed invention obvious and the patent invalid, because (according to the court of appeals) it believed that it was known that the answer to the problem of cold joints lay in heat treatment and that a generator of the type described by the inventor "would do the job."

The district judge concluded:

The question of radiant heat was old in the art. The pivotal question would more logically appear to be, assuming that the radiant heat would work effectively, was it obvious that a more successful machine would evolve if all of the elements were constructed on one chassis? It is my opinion that such a combination was reasonably obvious to one possessing ordinary skill in the art.

=== Court of appeals ruling ===
The patent owner appealed and the Fourth Circuit reversed (2-1). It held:

The defense is simply obviousness. The prior art, however, is predominantly a long history of failure to solve the problem by heat treatment. At a time when the industry was concentrating on a quite different, though expensive, partial corrective, there was nothing in the junk pile of prior art heat treatment patents to make it obvious to anyone that they supplied the ultimate solution. That this is so is forcefully demonstrated by the duration of the fruitless search, by the skepticism and incredulity with which experts in the field received Neville's disclosure, by its commercial success after demonstrations dissipated the disbelief of the experts, by the conduct of competitors in accepting licenses and purchasing equipment and the bold tribute of the alleged infringer in hailing it as the very antithesis of the obvious.

One judge dissented. He said, "Nor is it demonstrated to my satisfaction that the combination on one chassis of the paving machine and heat generator is necessary to produce the desired result. Yet, the combination is held patentable, though for all we know the same desired result may be achieved by two machines juxtaposed and separately propelled."

== Supreme Court ruling ==
The Supreme Court, without dissent, reversed the judgment of the Fourth Circuit and reinstated the judgment of the district court. Justice William O. Douglas delivered the opinion of the Court.

The Court agreed with the reasoning of the district court and the court of appeals dissent that combining the claimed elements of the patent was obvious: "A separate heater can also be used in conjunction with a standard paving machine to eliminate the cold joint, and in fact is so used for heating the transverse joints of the pavement."

The Court continued, "The combination of putting the burner together with the other elements in one machine, though perhaps a matter of great convenience, did not produce a 'new or different function.'" The Court also dismissed the Fourth Circuit's reliance on commercial success, because "those matters without invention will not make patentability."

Pointing to the Supreme Court's 1966 ruling in Graham v. John Deere Co., the Court said, as that case held, that "[t]he patent standard is basically constitutional, Article I, § 8, of the Constitution," and thus under that grant of power authorizing Congress "to promote the Progress of . . . useful Arts" Congress may not "enlarge the patent monopoly without regard to the innovation, advancement or social benefit gained thereby. . . . This is the standard expressed in the Constitution and it may not be ignored."

Therefore, based on the methodology commanded in the Graham case, the Court held the claimed combination obvious:

We conclude that while the combination of old elements performed a useful function, it added nothing to the nature and quality of the radiant-heat burner already patented. We conclude further that to those skilled in the art the use of the old elements in combination was not an invention by the obvious-nonobvious standard. Use of the radiant-heat burner in this important field marked a successful venture. But as noted, more than that is needed for invention.

== Subsequent developments ==
The United States Court of Appeals for the Federal Circuit for many years ignored and refused to cite or follow the Black Rock decision. But the 2007 Supreme Court decision in KSR v. Teflex, which cited and followed Black Rock for the proposition that "a court must ask whether the improvement is more than the predictable use of prior art elements according to their established functions," gave the Federal Circuit "forceful instruction" to change its approach. After the Supreme Court granted certiorari in the KSR case, the Federal Circuit began to defer to the Black Rock decision.
