= Illinois Tool Works Inc. v. Independent Ink, Inc. =

Illinois Tool Works, Inc. v. Independent Ink, Inc.
- Supreme Court of the United States

Argued November 29, 2005 Decided March 1, 2006
- Full case name: Illinois Tool Works Incorporated, et al. v. Independent Ink, Incorporated
- Docket no.: 04-1329
- Citations: 547 U.S. 28 (more) 126 S. Ct. 1281; 164 L. Ed. 2d 26; 2006 U.S. LEXIS 2024; 74 U.S.L.W. 4154; 77 U.S.P.Q.2d (BNA) 1801

Case history
- Prior: Summary judgment granted to defendant, sub nom. Indep. Ink v. Trident, Inc., 210 F. Supp. 2d 1155 (C.D. Cal. 2002); affirmed in part, reversed in part, sub nom. Indep. Ink, Inc. v. Ill. Tool Works, Inc., 396 F.3d 1342 (Fed. Cir. 2005); cert. granted, 545 U.S. 1127 (2005).
- Subsequent: On remand at Indep. Ink, Inc. v. Ill. Tool Works, Inc., 2006 U.S. App. LEXIS 10770 (Fed. Cir. Apr. 13, 2006)

Holding
- A product involved in a tying arrangement is not presumed to have market power for purposes of establishing an antitrust violation by the mere fact that it is patented.

Court membership
- Chief Justice John Roberts Associate Justices John P. Stevens · Antonin Scalia; Anthony Kennedy · David Souter; Clarence Thomas · Ruth Bader Ginsburg; Stephen Breyer · Samuel Alito

Case opinion
- Majority: Stevens, joined by Roberts, Scalia, Kennedy, Souter, Thomas, Ginsburg, Breyer
- Alito took no part in the consideration or decision of the case.

Laws applied
- 15 U.S.C. §§ 1, 2 (§§ 1 and 2 of the Sherman Antitrust Act)

Illinois Tool Works Inc. v. Independent Ink, Inc., 547 U.S. 28 (2006), was a case decided by the Supreme Court of the United States involving the application of U.S. antitrust law to "tying" arrangements of patented products. The Court ruled unanimously that there is not a presumption of market power under the Sherman Antitrust Act when the sale of a patented product is conditioned on the sale of a second product in a tying arrangement. A plaintiff alleging an antitrust violation must instead establish the defendant's market power in the patented product through evidence.

== Background ==
Independent Ink was a distributor of printer ink and related products. Trident manufactured ink-related products used in printers used to print bar codes on cardboard. Trident's license, when licensing its printing apparatus to those printers' manufacturers, required them to use Trident ink. However, it did not require end users of the bar-code printers to refill the printers with Trident ink cartridges. Trident did not, though, warranty its printer for use with others' ink cartridges.

In the course of a patent-infringement suit, Independent Ink alleged that Trident's license constituted a tying arrangement in violation of the Sherman Antitrust Act. (Illinois Tool Works then bought Trident, so was added as a defendant.) Its lawsuit was thrown out of the United States District Court for the Central District of California on summary judgment, June 3, 2002.

The United States Court of Appeals for the Federal Circuit reversed summary judgment for the most part, and the Supreme Court granted certiorari.

== Opinion of the Court ==
The Court vacated the Federal Circuit's decision.
