= United States v. Adams =

- Supreme Court of the United States

Argued October 14, 1965 Decided February 21, 1966
- Full case name: United States v. Bert N. Adams, et al.
- Citations: 383 U.S. 39 (more) 86 S. Ct. 708; 15 L. Ed. 2d 572; 1966 U.S. LEXIS 2754; 148 U.S.P.Q. (BNA) 479

Holding
- Wet battery including a combination of known elements not obvious because the operating characteristics were unexpected and improved over then-existing wet batteries.

Court membership
- Chief Justice Earl Warren Associate Justices Hugo Black · William O. Douglas; Tom C. Clark · John M. Harlan II; William J. Brennan Jr. · Potter Stewart; Byron White · Abe Fortas

Case opinions
- Majority: Clark, joined by Warren, Black, Douglas, Harlan, Brennan, Stewart
- Dissent: White
- Fortas took no part in the consideration or decision of the case.

United States v. Adams, 383 U.S. 39 (1966), is a United States Supreme Court decision in the area of patent law. This case was later cited in KSR v. Teleflex as an example of a case satisfying the requirement for non-obviousness of a combination of known elements. It also features one of the great stories of patent litigation lore, with Adams's attorney utilizing an innovative and unique method of non-oral advocacy at oral argument in front of the Supreme Court.

== Background ==
This case was a companion case to Graham v. John Deere, decided on the same day. The United States sought review of a judgment of the Court of Claims, holding valid and infringed a patent on a wet battery issued to Adams.

The suit was brought by Adams and others holding an interest in the patent against the Government charging the Government with infringement and breach of an implied contract. The Government challenged the validity of the patent and denied that it had been infringed or that any contract for its use had ever existed.

The Trial Commissioner held that the patent was valid and infringed in part but that no contract, express or implied, had been established. The United States sought certiorari on the patent validity issue only.

The patent under consideration, U.S. No. 2,322,210, relates to a nonrechargeable electrical battery composed of two electrodes - one of magnesium and the other of cuprous chloride, with a plain or salt water electrolyte.

The specifications of the patent states that the object of the invention is to provide constant voltage and current without the use of acids and without the generation of dangerous fumes. Another object was to provide a battery which may be manufactured and distributed in a dry condition and rendered serviceable by filling the container with water. Adams did not, however, claim this important distinguishing factor of his invention.

For several years prior to filing, Adams worked in his home experimenting on the development of a wet battery. He found that when cuprous chloride and magnesium were used in either plain water or salt water, an improved battery resulted.

Less than a month after filing, Adams brought his discovery to the attention of the Army and Navy. Arrangements were made for demonstrations before experts of the United States Army Signal Corps. The Signal Corps scientists did not believe the battery was workable. In particular, a government expert with the National Bureau of Standards felt that Adams was making unusually large claims that were not convincing.

Later, the Government entered into contracts with various manufacturers to produce the battery and did not notify or seek permission from Adams.

The basic idea of chemical generation of electricity was old, tracing back to the epic discovery by Italian scientist Alessandro Volta in 1795, who found that when two dissimilar metals are placed in an electrically conductive fluid an electromotive force is set up and electricity generated. The basic elements of a chemical battery are a pair of electrodes of different electrochemical properties and a liquid or moist paste electrolyte. Various materials may be employed as electrodes, various electrolyte are possible and many combinations of these elements have been the object of considerable experimentation.

The United States challenged the validity of the Adams patent on the ground of lack of novelty as well as obviousness.

The Government argued that wet batteries comprising a zinc anode and silver chloride cathode were old in the art; and that the prior art showed that magnesium could be substituted for zinc and cuprous chloride for silver chloride.

== Opinion of the Court ==
The Court noted several errors in the Government's position. First, the Adam's battery was water-activated, which set his device apart from the prior art, even though "water-activated" was not cited in the claims. In fact, this feature plays the central role in one of the great stories of patent litigation lore: Adams's attorney arose before the Supreme Court, took a drink from his glass of water, and then dropped a tiny Adams battery into the glass. The inventive battery immediately lit a tiny light that continued to burn throughout the argument. Some accounts suggest that the attorney knew he had won the case when the Justices kept their eyes on the tiny burning light throughout the remainder of the argument.

"Despite the fact that each of the elements of the Adams battery was well known in the prior art.... [K]nown disadvantages in old devices which would naturally discourage the search for new inventions may be taken into account in determining obviousness."

The Supreme Court's Adams opinion invokes several secondary considerations in favor of nonobviousness. In particular, the Court observed that the record disclosed the skepticism of experts before the invention, the endorsement of experts after disclosure, and unexpected results. In a case that featured a great deal of prior art very close to the invention, these secondary considerations evidently played an important, perhaps even dispositive, role.
