= Merck KGaA v. Integra Lifesciences I, Ltd. =

- Supreme Court of the United States

Argued April 20, 2005 Decided June 13, 2005
- Full case name: Merck KGaA, Petitioner v. Integra Lifesciences I, Ltd., et al.
- Citations: 545 U.S. 193 (more) 125 S. Ct. 2372; 162 L. Ed. 2d 160; 2005 U.S. LEXIS 4840; 73 U.S.L.W. 4468; 74 U.S.P.Q.2d (BNA) 1801; 18 Fla. L. Weekly Fed. S 394

Case history
- Prior: Integra Lifesciences I, Ltd. v. Merck KGaA, 331 F.3d 860 (Fed. Cir. 2003); cert. granted, 543 U.S. 1041 (2005).
- Subsequent: On remand at Integra Lifesciences I, LTD. v. Merck KGaA, 496 F.3d 1334 (Fed. Cir. 2005).

Holding
- The Court held that the use of patented compounds in preclinical studies is protected under § 271(e)(1) at least as long as there is a reasonable basis to believe that the compound tested could be the subject of an FDA submission and the experiments will produce the types of information relevant to an IND or NDA.

Court membership
- Chief Justice William Rehnquist Associate Justices John P. Stevens · Sandra Day O'Connor; Antonin Scalia · Anthony Kennedy; David Souter · Clarence Thomas; Ruth Bader Ginsburg · Stephen Breyer

Case opinion
- Majority: Scalia, joined by unanimous

Laws applied
- U.S. Const.; 35 U.S.C. § 271(e)(1)

Merck KGaA v. Integra Lifesciences I, Ltd., 545 U.S. 193 (2005), is a United States Supreme Court case with ramifications for patent law. The dispute dates to approximately 1996 and centers on a federal law known as the "FDA safe harbor" (§ 271(e)(1)).

While the Court refused to "quibble" with the Court of Appeals over its conclusion that the exemption “does not globally embrace all experimental activity that at some point, however attenuated, may lead to an FDA approval process,” the Court held that:

Basic scientific research on a particular compound, performed without the intent to develop a particular drug or a reasonable belief that the compound will cause the sort of physiological effect the researcher intends to induce, is surely not “reasonably related to the development and submission of information” to the FDA. It does not follow from this, however, that §271(e)(1)’s exemption from infringement categorically excludes either (1) experimentation on drugs that are not ultimately the subject of an FDA submission or (2) use of patented compounds in experiments that are not ultimately submitted to the FDA. Under certain conditions, we think the exemption is sufficiently broad to protect the use of patented compounds in both situations.

The Court expressly adopted the construction of the law articulated by Federal Circuit Judge Pauline Newman.

== See also ==
- United States patent law
