= Egbert v. Lippmann =

- Supreme Court of the United States

Argued November 11, 14, 1881 Decided December 12, 1881
- Full case name: Egbert v. Lippmann
- Citations: 104 U.S. 333 (more) 26 L. Ed. 755; 1881 U.S. LEXIS 2008; 14 Otto 333

Case history
- Prior: On appeal from the United States Circuit Court for the Southern District of New York

Holding
- Sale or public use of an invention for a statutorily-specified time period bars patenting of that invention.

Court membership
- Chief Justice Morrison Waite Associate Justices Samuel F. Miller · Stephen J. Field; Joseph P. Bradley · Ward Hunt; John M. Harlan · William B. Woods; Stanley Matthews

Case opinions
- Majority: Woods, joined by Waite, Clifford, Field, Bradley, Hunt, Harlan, Matthews
- Dissent: Miller

Laws applied
- 35 U.S.C. § 102

Egbert v. Lippmann, 104 U.S. 333 (1881), was a case in which the Supreme Court of the United States held that public use of an invention bars the patenting of it. The Court's ruling was colored by its view that the inventor had forfeited his right to patent the invention by "sleeping on his rights" while others commercialized the technology.

== Background ==
=== Facts ===
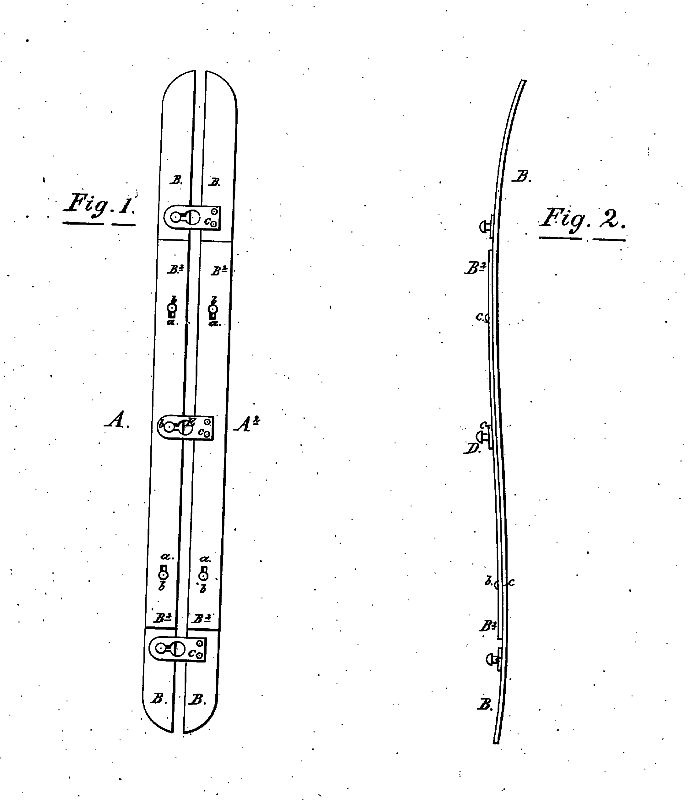
The corset stay patented in this case

Samuel Barnes designed "corset-steels", which were vertically disposed springs to stiffen a corset. Samuel made the invention in 1855 after he had been present while two women, his "intimate friend," Frances Willis, and her friend, Miss Cugier, were "complaining of the breaking of their corset steels." Samuel devised a stronger device using two pieces of metal fastened together to create a doubled, reinforced corset steel. He then gave the springs to Frances, who would in 1863 become his wife and later the executrix of his will. In 1858 he gave her another set of steels, which she used for a long time. In 1863, Samuel and Frances showed the invention to his friend Joseph Sturgis; and in March 1866 Samuel applied for a patent. Samuel died a month after the patent issued in July 1866. Frances remarried in 1870 and became Frances Egbert. Subsequently, Frances, as Samuel's executrix and owner of the patent, sued for patent infringement.

=== Proceedings in lower court ===
Frances Egbert sued Phillip Lippmann and August Seligmann in the Southern District of New York. Circuit Judge Blatchford tried the case and held the patent invalid because of public use. He ruled:

It was not a use for experiment, or a use in private or a private use. It was a practical use in public of the completed article [despite its concealment and invisibility within the corset]. No secrecy was maintained or enjoined as to the article or its structure.

Frances appealed the judgment to the Supreme Court.

== Ruling of Supreme Court ==
=== Majority opinion ===
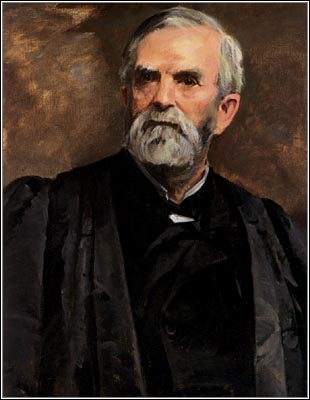
Justice William Burnham Woods

Justice William Burnham Woods wrote for the majority, explaining that public use of the invention by only one person is sufficient to be considered a public use, even where the usage of the invention is not visible to the general public. Similarly, a gift to another party without regard to secrecy or restrictions on use is sufficient to bar a patent for the same reason. Whether the use of an invention is public use or private use "does not necessarily depend on the number of persons to whom its use is known."

Rather: "If an inventor, having made his device, gives or sells it to another, to be used by the donee or vendee without limitation or restriction or injunction of secrecy and it is so used, such use is public even though the use and knowledge of the use may be confined to one person." It is a public use because "[s}he might have exhibited them to any person, or made other steels of the same kind and used or sold them without violating any condition or restriction imposed on her by the inventor." Thus, the Court treated Barnes's gift of the corset steels to his "intimate friend" (not then his wife) without her first signing a confidentiality agreement as if it were a sale in the ordinary course of business.

The majority held that the use here was different from that in City of Elizabeth v. Pavement Company because this was not a good faith effort to test or experiment with the design. Furthermore, Barnes "slept on his rights" for the eleven years between 1855 and 1866, not applying for a patent until other manufacturers had already incorporated aspects similar to Barnes' design into their own products. He did not bother applying for a patent until he came to the belated realization that he could potentially profit from his invention. Thefore, the court held the patent invalid.

=== Dissent ===
Justice Samuel Freeman Miller was the sole dissenter in this case, disagreeing with the majority about the "public" nature of Frances' use of the corset-steels. He argued that the majority ignored the statutory word "public" in the patent law's making "public use" a bar to patenting an invention. Miller argued:

A private use with consent, which could lead to no copy or reproduction of the machine, which taught the nature of the invention to no one but the party to whom such consent was given, which left the public at large as ignorant of this as it was before the author's discovery, was no abandonment to the public, and did not defeat his claim for a patent. If the little steep spring inserted in a single pair of corsets, and used by only one woman, covered by her outer clothing, and in a position always withheld from public observation, is a public use of that piece of steel, I am at a loss to know the line between a private and a public use.

== Subsequent legislation ==
The 2011 America Invents Act (AIA) may have completely overturned Egbert v. Lipmann. The public use provision of the statute now provides that a person is not entitled to a patent if "the claimed invention was . . . in public use . . . or otherwise available to the public before the effective filing date of the claimed invention." That appears to limit public use to uses available to the public and to exclude as bars to patentability any hidden, inaccessible, private uses, since it implies that public use is within the class of things otherwise available to the public. A steel spring hidden within a corset would not seem to be available to the public.

The availability requirement is consistent with the AIA's legislative history. Prior to the Senate vote, Senator Jon Kyl explained to the Senate that the Judiciary Committee had added the words "otherwise available to the public" to "abrogate...the rule announced in Egbert v. Lippmann."

== Commentary ==
Feminist commentator Kara Swanson analyzed the case as explicating the public use doctrine at "the intersections of gender and intellectual property from a feminist perspective." In her view:

Like the more celebrated technologies of the era, such as the telephone, the telegraph, and the light bulb, the corset was the product of many inventors, making and patenting improvements, and fighting about their rights in court. As American women donned their corsets, they were enacting a daily intimate relationship with a heavily patent-protected technology. The corset during these decades was deeply embedded both within the social construction of gender and sexuality, as a marker of femininity and respectability, and within the United States patent system, as a commercial good in which many claimed intellectual property rights. Getting a grip on the corset, then, offers a way to simultaneously consider gender, sexuality, and patent law.

Swanson argues that the Court's considerable expansion of the concept of "public use" from commercial exploitation to secret use without a confidentiality agreement reflected the Court nineteenth century gender biases. The Court's majority was antagonistic to Frances's failing to adhere to "the prevailing gender ideology of the time" by becoming not only a corset manufacturer but a patent enforcing litigant—"a role in which she acted in the public sphere directly, without the mediation of a man, and in unspoken defiance of the separate spheres ideology" according to which women did not publicly act as men. Swanson scoffs at the majority's demand that Barnes should have got Frances to sign a confidentiality agreement in order to avoid abandonment of his right to a patent:

A man need not get his lover to sign an agreement that she would not show her undergarments to anyone else; his exclusive right to view those undergarments was an assumption of their private relationship. And if the relationship was private, then was the use of the steel not also private, and therefore unable to trigger the statutory bar?

Brian J. Love explains the ruling as an example of "bad facts ushering the creation of bad law." He finds it "hard to imagine a decision that deems 'public' the interior of a romantic partner's underwear." The case makes more sense, he argues, to view the case as one of a "submarine" invention. He points to the facts: "first, that the inventor waited eleven years before filing a patent application; and second, that the corset spring industry independently and innocently adopted the same design in the meantime." Love therefore castigates the Egbert Court for distorting patent law to reach its judgment in this case:

Rather than enunciating an equitable rule to protect settled expectations, and conversely to punish those who sit on their rights only to spring forth later and disrupt those expectations, the Court chose instead to stretch the meaning of "publicly used" to an arguably tortured and, at the very least, quite counter-intuitive extent. Members of the Court, it seems quite possible, spotted a bad actor and made a deliberate decision not to reward his sharp behavior. But, rather than doing so forthrightly and in a manner directed solely at the inventor involved in this case, the Court did so sub silentio and in a manner that created a perennial trap for unsophisticated inventors that continues to destroy the nascent patent rights of small inventors to this day, more than a century later.
