= Continental Paper Bag Co. v. Eastern Paper Bag Co. =

- Supreme Court of the United States

Argued April 15, 1908 Decided June 1, 1908
- Full case name: Continental Paper Bag Co. v. Eastern Paper Bag Co.
- Citations: 210 U.S. 405 (more) 28 S. Ct. 748; 52 L. Ed. 1122; 1908 U.S. LEXIS 1519

Case history
- Prior: 150 F. 741 (1st Cir. 1906)

Holding
- It was not unreasonable for a patent owner to use existing equipment embodying old technology rather than to build new machines using new patents. Also, it was not unreasonable for the patent owner to refuse to license others to use its new patents.

Court membership
- Chief Justice Melville Fuller Associate Justices John M. Harlan · David J. Brewer; Edward D. White · Rufus W. Peckham; Joseph McKenna · Oliver W. Holmes Jr. William R. Day · William H. Moody

Case opinions
- Majority: McKenna, joined by Fuller, Brewer, White, Peckham, Holmes, Day, Moody
- Dissent: Harlan

Continental Paper Bag Co. v. Eastern Paper Bag Co., 210 U.S. 405 (1908), was a case in which the Supreme Court of the United States established the principle that patent holders have no obligation to use their patent.

== Facts ==
Eastern Paper Bag brought an action to prevent its competitor Continental Paper Bag from using its patent for a "self-opening" paper bag. Continental Paper Bag alleged that Eastern Paper Bag was not using its patent but simply trying to suppress competition.

== Decision of the Supreme Court ==
The Supreme Court rejected this argument by Continental Paper Bag, holding that it was the essence of the patent to exclude others without question of motive.

== See also ==
- List of United States Supreme Court cases, volume 210
- Hartford-Empire Co. v. United States, 323 U.S. 386 (1945)
