= Bauer & Cie. v. O'Donnell =

- Supreme Court of the United States

Argued April 10, 1913 Decided May 26, 1913
- Full case name: Bauer & Cie. and the Bauer Chemical Company v. James O'Donnell
- Citations: 229 U.S. 1 (more) 33 S. Ct. 616; 57 L. Ed. 1041; 1913 U.S. LEXIS 2417

Case history
- Subsequent: Certificate from the Court of appeals of the District of Columbia.

Court membership
- Chief Justice Edward D. White Associate Justices Joseph McKenna · Oliver W. Holmes Jr. William R. Day · Horace H. Lurton; Charles E. Hughes · Willis Van Devanter; Joseph R. Lamar · Mahlon Pitney

Case opinions
- Majority: Day, joined by White, Hughes, Lamar, Pitney
- Dissent: Holmes, joined by McKenna, Lurton, Van Devanter

Bauer & Cie. v. O'Donnell, 229 U.S. 1 (1913), was a 1913 United States Supreme Court decision involving whether a purchaser of a patented product bearing a price-fixing notice incurs guilt of patent infringement by reselling the product at a price lower than that which the notice commands. A divided Court (5–4) held that it was not.

Bauer & Cie, a German company, was the assignee of U.S. Patent No. 601,995, covering Sanatogen, a water-soluble drug product (patent medicine), advertised as the "King of Tonics" and a strength-giving "concentrated scientific food." Bauer sold the patented product in the United States through its exclusive sales agent, Hehmeyer, under a license agreement. Sanatogen was sold with this notice on each bag:

Notice to the Retailer.

This size package of Sanatogen is licensed by us for sale and use at a price not less than one dollar ($1.00). Any sale in violation of this condition, or use when so sold, will constitute an infringement of our patent No. 601,995, under which Sanatogen is manufactured, and all persons so selling or using packages or contents will be liable to injunction and damages.

A purchase is an acceptance of this condition. All rights revert to the undersigned in the event of violation.

O'Donnell, a retail druggist in Washington, DC, purchased Sanatogen at wholesale and resold the Sanatogen for less than $1. He persisted in doing this and was cut off, but he managed to continue to purchase the product from jobbers in DC "and avers that he will continue such sales." This led to the present patent infringement suit. The Court of Appeals of the District of Columbia certified the case to the Supreme Court with this question:

Did the Acts of the appellee [O'Donnell] in retailing at less than the price fixed in said notice on original packages of Sanatogen purchased of jobbers, as aforesaid, constitute infringement of appellants' patent?

== Ruling of Supreme Court ==
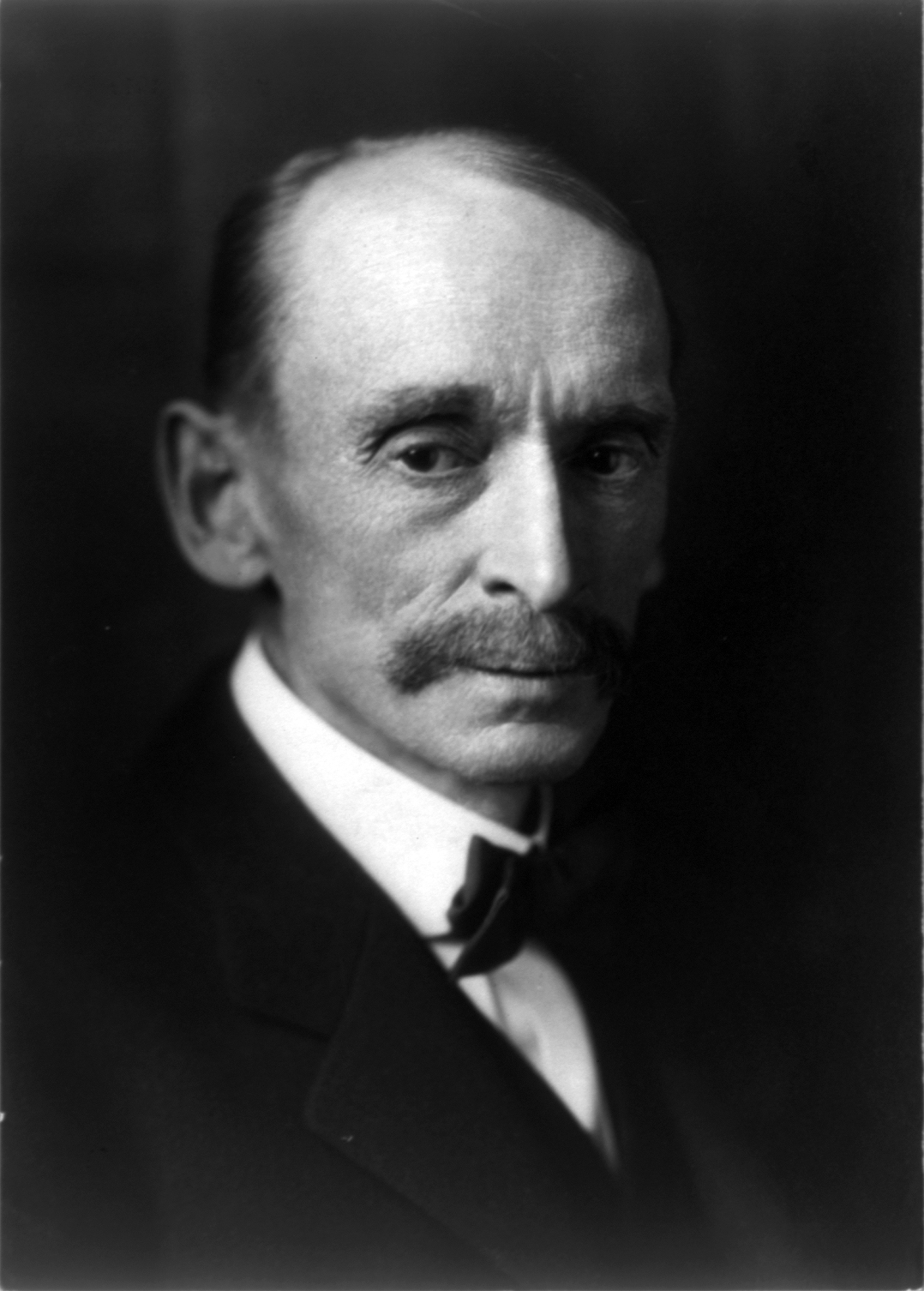
Justice Day delivered the majority opinion.

Justice William R. Day delivered the majority opinion, joined by Justices White, Hughes, Lamar, Pitney. Justices McKenna, Holmes, Lurton, and Van Devanter dissented without opinion.

The Court restated the question before it as:

The question therefore now before this Court for judicial determination, is: may a patentee, by notice, limit the price at which future retail sales of the patented article may be made, such article being in the hands of a retailer by purchase from a jobber who has paid to the agent of the patentee the full price asked for the article sold?

The patentee argued that the purpose of the restrictive notice was "to prevent ruinous competition by the cutting of prices in sales of the patented article." Day responded, however, that absent a patent the Court had held resale price fixing unlawful in Dr. Miles Medical Co. v. John D. Park & Sons Co. And Congress could, if it had wanted to, have conferred on patentees the right to impose such restrictions. He then asked:

Has it done so? The question has not been determined in any previous case in this Court, so far as we are aware. It was dealt with under the copyright statute, however, in the case of Bobbs-Merrill Co. v. Straus.

In the Bobbs-Merrill case the Court held that the copyright was exhausted by the first sale, and:

[I]t was not the purpose of the law to grant the further right to qualify the title of future purchasers by means of the printed notice affixed to the book, and that to give such right would extend the statute beyond its fair meaning and secure privileges not intended to be covered by the Act of Congress.

The Court recognized that "there are differences between the copyright statute and the patent statute, and the purpose to decide the question now before us was expressly disclaimed" in Bobbs–Merrill. Nonetheless, "it is apparent that, in the respect involved in the present inquiry, there is a strong similarity between and identity of purpose in the two statutes." Both statutes grant an exclusive right to "vend." There is no difference of importance in the respective legal rights to vend books and vend products:

So far as the use of the terms "vend" and "vending" is concerned, the protection intended to be secured is substantially identical. The sale of a patented article is not essentially different from the sale of a book. In each case, to vend is to part with the thing for a consideration.

The patentee here insists that the purpose of notices fixing resale prices, specifically "keeping up prices and preventing competition"—is more essential to the protection of patented goods than of copyrighted books. The Court expressed doubt that this was so, but in any case it was more likely that "Congress had no intention to use the term 'vend' in one sense in the patent act and . . . in another in the copyright law." Congress intended to provide "[p}rotection in the exclusive right to sell . . . in both instances, and the terms used in the statutes are to all intents the same."

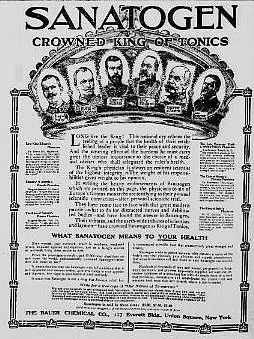
Sanatogen, "crowned King of Tonics," according to this 1911 advertisement, was "a concentrated scientific food that constructively gives strength and vitality"

The only significant difference is that patent law gives an exclusive right to use and copyright law does not. The Supreme Court decision involving a post-sale restraint on which the patentee places chief reliance here is Henry v. A.B. Dick Co. But that decision was based on the exclusive use right:

[T]he restriction was sustained because of the right to use the machine granted in the patent statute, distinguishing in that respect the patent from the copyright act. In that case, a patented mimeograph had been sold which bore an inscription in the form of a notice that the machine was sold with the license restriction that it might only be used with stencil, ink, and other supplies made by the A. B. Dick Company, the owners of the patent. The alleged infringer sold to the purchaser of the mimeograph a can of ink suitable for use with machine, with full knowledge of the restriction, and with the expectation that the ink sold would be used in connection with the machine.

Here, the patentee has argued "that the notice in this case deals with the use of the invention, because the notice states that the package is licensed 'for sale and use at a price not less than $1,' [and] that a purchase is an acceptance of the conditions. . ." But, the Court insisted:

[I]t is a perversion of terms to call the transaction in any sense a license to use the invention. The jobber from whom the appellee [O'Donnell] purchased had previously bought, at a price which must be deemed to have been satisfactory, the packages of Sanatogen afterwards sold to the appellee. The patentee had no interest in the proceeds of the subsequent sales, no right to any royalty thereon, or to participation in the profits thereof. The packages were sold with as full and complete title as any article could have when sold in the open market, excepting only the attempt to limit the sale or use when sold for not less than $1. In other words, the title transferred was full and complete, with an attempt to reserve the right to fix the price at which subsequent sales could be made. . . There was no transfer of a limited right to use this invention, and to call the sale a license to use is a mere play upon words.

As in Bobbs-Merrill Co v. Straus, with copyright, the Court ruled, restrictions could not be extended beyond the terms of the statute, which grants an exclusive right to vend but grants no "privilege to keep up prices and prevent competition by notices restricting the price at which the article may be resold." When the right to vend is exercised, patent rights are exhausted:

This being so, the case is brought within that line of cases in which this Court, from the beginning, has held that a patentee who has parted with a patented machine by passing title to a purchaser has placed the article beyond the limits of the monopoly secured by the patent act. [As in] Adams v. Burke, . . . in the essential nature of things, when the patentee, or the person having his rights, sells a machine or instrument whose sole value is in its use, he receives the consideration for its use and he parts with the right to restrict that use. The article, in the language of the court, passes without the limit of the monopoly.

== Commentary ==
● A contemporary Note in the Michigan Law Review said the case "was of vital importance to a large number of manufacturers," as was "evidenced by the various ingenious methods and devices which have since been adopted by numerous manufacturers to avoid the operation and application of the principles set forth in the decision," such as leasing and agency. The writer was surprised that "The tendency of the Supreme Court seems to be to take the view that the monopoly enjoyed by the patentee was not meant by Congress to be without limitation, and consequently to make it practically impossible for the patentee to control the retail price."

The writer maintains: "This decision by the Supreme Court was unquestionably a very great surprise to many, as it is not only directly in conflict with an almost unbroken line of decisions of the inferior federal courts," beginning with the Button-Fastener case, and "it is also nearly impossible to reconcile this decision" with Henry v. A. B. Dick Co. As for the Dick case, the writer continues, "It was generally thought that in the Dick case the Supreme Court had expressly committed itself to the doctrine that the patentee could require the user to comply with any conditions which he might choose to impose." He considers the distinction drawn with that case to be flimsy and not "clear, sound, or convincing."

● A contemporary Note in the California Law Review also observed that in light of the A.B. Dick decision it was natural "that some slight surprise should be occasioned by the decision of the Supreme Court in the so-called Sanatogen case which holds that a patentee is without right to make or enforce a resale price stipulation." More accurately than the Michigan note, this note attributed the see-sawing in recent years to the changes in the personnel of a closely divided Court and successive replacements by new Roosevelt, Taft, and Wilson appointees:

It is of decided interest to note that the four justices who constituted the majority of the court in the Dick case, dissented from the decision of the Sanatogen case. Of the five justices who formed the majority in the latter decision, three had vigorously dissented in Henry v. Dick Company; the other two justices took no part in the determination of the earlier case. Whether there be a valid ground of distinction between the two cases or not, the results reached would seem to be best accounted for by the difference in the personnel of the court. The law on this and other similar questions in regard to a patentee's rights is apparently in a state of some uncertainty, and the presence or absence of certain justices would seem to be an important factor in the determination of any case which might arise in the future.

● Granville Munson, in a 1917 article on post-sale restraints, found the A.B. Dick and Bauer cases irreconcilable: "It is submitted the Sanatogen case and the Dick case cannot both be upheld, although the court professes to distinguish the latter." He insisted that the exclusive right to "vend" must include the right to set terms and conditions on which the patented article will be vended, and not just the right to sell or not sell: "If the word, "vend," is to have any particular meaning in the patent law, it is submitted it must be taken to refer to the conditions which may be imposed on subsales." Munson therefore concludes that "the decision in Bauer & Cie v. O'Donnell should not be supported."

● Charles Miller was critical of the Court's decision to suppress Bauer's resale price fixing:

The principal argument of those opposed to price maintenance among retailers, in legislative committees, and on the bench, is that after one has parted with title to an article, he should not be allowed further to control it. That idea seems to underlie the recent enunciations of the Supreme Court . . . The fallacy in this argument is that the manufacturer's interest in his product does not end with the transfer of title to the dealer, but follows the article into the hands of the ultimate consumer or user. His business life is dependent upon the public's being able to buy his article everywhere at a uniform price, and always of the same quality. Cut price sales will speedily and surely decrease the sale of his product; and if he is able to survive the loss of business, the manufacturer will be forced to reduce the quality of his article. One dealer advertising a so-called "cut price" sale invariably causes other dealers to cut below him in retaliation, with the result that all dealers in the community are forced to sell the particular article at a price which yields no profit. It hardly need be said they will not long continue to handle an article at a loss; so the market for the article is killed in that community, not because the people want the "just-as-good" substitute, nor because the quality of the article has been lowered, nor because the standard price is exorbitant, but because a business parasite used the good name of a popular article to deceive the. public into believing he sold everything below cost.

He added:

The price cutter is not a philanthropist, lie is a robber, stealing the advertising and filching the good will of another's product; and like all thieves he does not share his booty with the public. "I cannot believe", said Mr. Justice Holmes in his strong dissent in the Dr. Miles Case, "that in the long run the public will profit by this court permitting knaves to cut reasonable prices for some ulterior purpose of their own, and thus to impair, if not destroy, the production and sale of articles which it is assumed to be desirable that the public should be able to get."

== See also ==
- Arizona Cartridge Remanufacturers Association Inc. v. Lexmark International Inc.
