= Ex parte Lundgren =

Administrative Decision Regarding Patent Eligible Subject Matter

Ex parte Lundgren is a 2005 decision by the United States Patent and Trademark Office board of appeals, i.e. the Board of Patent Appeals and Interferences (BPAI) concerning the standard for patent eligible subject matter in the United States. Under 35 U.S.C. 101, patent applicants are entitled to a patent only if they claim patent eligible subject matter. In Lundren, the applicant sought to patent a business method for evaluating and rewarding manager performance. Following an initial examination, the USPTO examiner rejected the applicant's claims, finding that they were not directed towards the patent eligible subject matter. The applicant appealed this decision to the Board of Patent Appeals and Interferences, which subsequently held that process inventions do not have to be in the technological arts in order to be patentable in the United States. They do, however, have to produce a "concrete, useful and tangible result".

The Board's decision in Lundgren constituted one of the first in a series of decisions beginning in the mid-2000s and continuing into the late 2010s regarding patent eligible subject matter.

== See also ==
- Business method patent
- Ex Parte Bowman
- Diamond v. Diehr
- Freeman-Walter-Abele Test
- State Street Bank v. Signature Financial Group
