= City of Elizabeth v. American Nicholson Pavement Co. =

- Supreme Court of the United States

Argued October, 1877 Decided May 13, 1878
- Full case name: City of Elizabeth v. American Nicholson Pavement Company
- Citations: 97 U.S. 126 (more) 24 L. Ed. 1000; 1877 U.S. LEXIS 1761; 7 Otto 126

Case history
- Prior: Appeal from the Circuit Court of the United States for the District of New Jersey

Holding
- Public use of an invention for the purpose of testing and experimenting with it does not create a bar to patentability.

Court membership
- Chief Justice Morrison Waite Associate Justices Nathan Clifford · Noah H. Swayne; Samuel F. Miller · Stephen J. Field; William Strong · Joseph P. Bradley; Ward Hunt · John M. Harlan

Case opinion
- Majority: Bradley, joined by unanimous

Laws applied
- 35 U.S.C. § 102

City of Elizabeth v. American Nicholson Pavement Co., 97 U.S. 126 (1878), was a case in which the Supreme Court of the United States held that while the public use of an invention more than one year prior to the inventor's application for a patent normally causes the inventor to lose his right to a patent, there is an exception to this rule for public uses for experimental purposes.

== Facts and procedural history ==
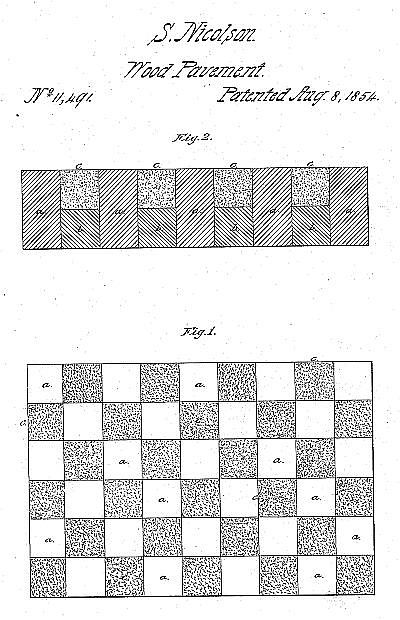
Nicolson's patented pavement, as shown in his patent

Inventor Samuel Nicholson (alt. spelling Nicolson) had patented a process for Nicolson pavement on August 8, 1854, a system of pavement using wooden blocks. Although Nicholson had died before the commencement of the lawsuit, George T. Bigelow, representative of the American Nicholson Pavement Company brought the lawsuit on his behalf, alleging that the City of Elizabeth, New Jersey, George W. Tubbs, and the New Jersey Wood-Paving Co. had infringed on his patent. Nicholson was testing his new process publicly at the time the patent was filed. The defendants alleged that Nicholson's patent was invalid because the invention lacked novelty, and that he had been publicly using the system for the previous six years prior to the issuance of the patent, thus constituting an abandonment of his right to a patent under the "On-sale bar". The lower court found for Nicholson, and the defendants appealed.

== Decision ==
Justice Bradley first examined the prior art in both the U.S. and England, and determined that nothing therein substantiated the defendants' claim of lack of novelty. Although the elements specified in Nicholson's claims were not new, there was nothing in the prior art to suggest his particular combination of these elements.

As to the question of whether Nicholson abandoned his rights by his public use of the claimed invention, Bradley examined the circumstances surrounding the public use. Nicholson put down a section of his new pavement on a turnpike in Boston, Massachusetts in 1848 in order to test its durability and the public's response to it. The turnpike was operated by a private corporation in which Nicholson was a shareholder and officer.

Bradley reasoned that Nicholson had not done anything which would indicate his intent to relinquish his right to patent his invention. He had no other means of testing the pavement other than by allowing the general public to use it, and had supervised the experiment itself. He did not sell or license his invention to any other party. Although the general public may have derived some incidental benefit from Nicholson's public testing of this invention, he did not give any sort of general assent for the invention to be used by any other party, and he applied for a patent as soon as he was able to determine that his system of paving was sound. Bradley held that this was not the sort of use which created a bar to patentability.

Bradley went on to affirm the lower court's finding that the defendants had infringed Nicholson's patents, and that although the City of Elizabeth did not make any direct profit from the arrangement, the other two defendants had, and their amount of liability was not reduced by Nicholson's later assignment of the patent.

== See also ==
- List of United States Supreme Court cases, volume 97
