= United States Patents Quarterly =

Legal magazine in the United States

The United States Patents Quarterly (U.S.P.Q.) is a United States legal reporter published by the Bloomberg Industry Group in Washington, D.C. The U.S.P.Q. covers intellectual property cases including patents, copyrights, trademarks, and trade secrets, from 1913 to the present. The publisher stopped the sequence of volume numbers and restarted with a second series, cited as U.S.P.Q. 2d (BNA), in 1987.

The U.S.P.Q. reports case law from the United States Supreme Court and most federal appeals courts, including the Court of Appeals for the Federal Circuit, United States Court of Federal Claims, and United States Court of Customs and Patent Appeals. It also includes cases from United States District Courts, and certain decisions from administrative tribunals, such as the Trademark Trial and Appeal Board, the Board of Patent Appeals and Interferences, the United States International Trade Commission and the Commissioner of Patents and Trademarks, and opinions from state courts.

The reporter is published with a digest in cumulative and annual volumes. The digests have headnotes from the opinions and are organized according to a classification scheme. The digests are published with cases of tables organized alphabetically and by tribunal, and with a topical index.

== See also ==
- List of intellectual property law journals
- European Patent Office Reports (EPOR)
