= Perfect Web Technologies, Inc. v. InfoUSA, Inc. =

Perfect Web Tech., Inc. v. InfoUSA, Inc.
- Court: United States Court of Appeals for the Federal Circuit
- Full case name: Perfect Web Technologies, Inc. v. InfoUSA, Inc.
- Decided: December 2 2009
- Citations: 587 F.3d 1324; 92 U.S.P.Q.2d 1849

Case history
- Prior history: Perfect Web Techs., Inc. v. InfoUSA., No. 07-CV-80286 (S.D. Fla. Oct. 24, 2008).

Holding
- Federal Circuit agreed with the district court that U.S. Patent No. 6,631,400 was invalid due to the obvious nature of the claims, holding that an KSR-style obviousness analysis may include recourse to logic, judgment, and common sense available to an ordinary person when its reasoning is sufficiently articulated.

Court membership
- Judges sitting: Richard Linn, Timothy B. Dyk, Sharon Prost

Case opinions
- Majority: Richard Linn

Laws applied
- 35 U.S.C. § 103, 35 U.S.C. § 102(b), 35 U.S.C. § 101

Perfect Web Technologies, Inc. v. InfoUSA, Inc. 587 F.3d 1324 (Fed. Cir. 2009), is a United States Court of Appeals for the Federal Circuit case in which the court held that a patent can be invalidated due to the obvious nature of the asserted claims. Perfect Web, an e-mail marketer, sued its competitor InfoUSA for patent infringement, claiming that InfoUSA's bulk email distribution method infringed its Patent No. 6,631,400 ('400 patent). The district court initially found that the patent did not meet the non-obviousness requirement and was therefore invalid. On appeal, The Federal Court agreed that the patent was obvious because someone of ordinary skill could arrive at the patent claim using common sense.

== Background ==
Tom DiStefano of Perfect Web Technologies filed his quota-fulfilling bulk email patent, U.S. Patent No. 6,631,400, during the height of the internet tech bubble on April 13, 2000. The '400 patent asserts several claims regarding managing bulk e-mail distribution to groups of targeted consumers. At issue was Claim 1, which reads as follows:

1. A method for managing bulk e-mail distribution comprising the steps:

- (A) matching a target recipient profile with a group of target recipients;
- (B) transmitting a set of bulk e-mails to said target recipients in said matched group;
- (C) calculating a quantity of e-mails in said set of bulk e-mails which have been successfully received by said target recipients; and,
- (D) if said calculated quantity does not exceed a prescribed minimum quantity of successfully received e-mails, repeating steps (A)-(C) until said calculated quantity exceeds said prescribed minimum quantity.

=== District Court opinion ===
In March 2007, Perfect Web sued competitor InfoUSA Inc., a company engaged in email marketing, for patent infringement of the '400 patent. In response, InfoUSA moved for summary judgment of invalidity of the patent. After conducting a Markman hearing, but without issuing a formal claim construction order, the district court granted InfoUSA's motion and concluded that steps (A)-(C) were covered by prior art and that step (D) would "be obvious to virtually anyone" and that the "final step is merely the logical result of common sense application of the maxim 'try, try again.'". For the purposes of the appeal, Perfect Web concedes that steps (A)-(C) were disclosed in prior art references but argues that there are factual disputes on several issues: whether "common sense" would have taught step (D), that the claims were not "obvious to try", and the "presence of a long-felt need". Perfect Web contends that the district court improperly viewed the invention through a hindsight-tinted lens, and discounted expert testimony that the patent was not a common-sense advance.

== Opinion of the Federal Circuit Court ==
The United States Court of Appeals for the Federal Circuit affirmed the United States District Court for the Southern District of Florida's decision granting summary judgment to invalidate Perfect Web's '400 patent due to the obvious nature of the asserted claims under 35 U.S.C. § 103.

=== Common sense ===
The Federal Circuit noted, as observed by the Supreme Court in KSR v. Teleflex, that common sense can be a source of reasons to combine or modify prior art references to achieve the patented invention. Furthermore, the court held that analysis of obviousness may "include recourse to logic, judgment, and common sense available to the person of ordinary skill" that do not explicitly require expert opinion. Although the court did hear testimony from experts on both sides, they declared that these opinions were not required to conclude, as the district court did, that step (D) was one of the "inferences and creative steps that a person of ordinary skill would employ."

=== Obvious to try ===
Even if common sense was not applied, the Federal Circuit held the claims were still obvious, as they were obvious to try. In addressing the "obvious to try" formulation, the court identified the problem the patent addresses is "sending too few or too many email messages to meet a fixed marketing quota." The court recognized that the experts collectively identified three potential solutions: increasing the size of the initial recipient list; resending e-mails to recipients who did not receive them on the first attempt; and selecting a new recipient list and sending e-mails to them. The last option corresponded to step (D) of the invention as claimed. The court notes that "simple logic" suggests that trying again with new addresses, rather than failed addresses, as directed by the patented method, would have been obvious to try.

=== Long-felt need ===
The Federal Circuit rejected Perfect Web's arguments that the patent satisfied a long-felt need because they failed to provide any evidence of improved efficiency beyond "bare assertion". The court, referencing Asyst Techs., Inc. v. Emtrak, Inc., suggested that any proof of long-felt need would be insufficient to "overcome [the] strong prima facie showing of obviousness."

For the reasons stated above, the court affirmed the district court's summary judgment of obviousness of the asserted claims.

== Subsequent Developments ==
In September 2010, the U.S. Patent and Trademark Office released new guidelines for patent examiners that update the standards for obviousness and aim to provide direction in the application of obviousness rejections. The updated guidelines incorporate 24 decisions, including Perfect Web, handed down by the U.S. Court of Appeals for the Federal Circuit since the 2007 U.S. Supreme Court decision in KSR v. Teleflex. The Perfect Web case was used as a "teaching point" for the obvious to try rationale: "where there were a finite number of identified, predictable solutions and there is no evidence of unexpected results, an obvious to try inquiry may properly lead to a legal conclusion of obviousness."

== See also ==
- Graham v. John Deere Co. (1966)
- KSR v. Teleflex (2007)
