= Flash of genius =

Archaic concept in US patent law

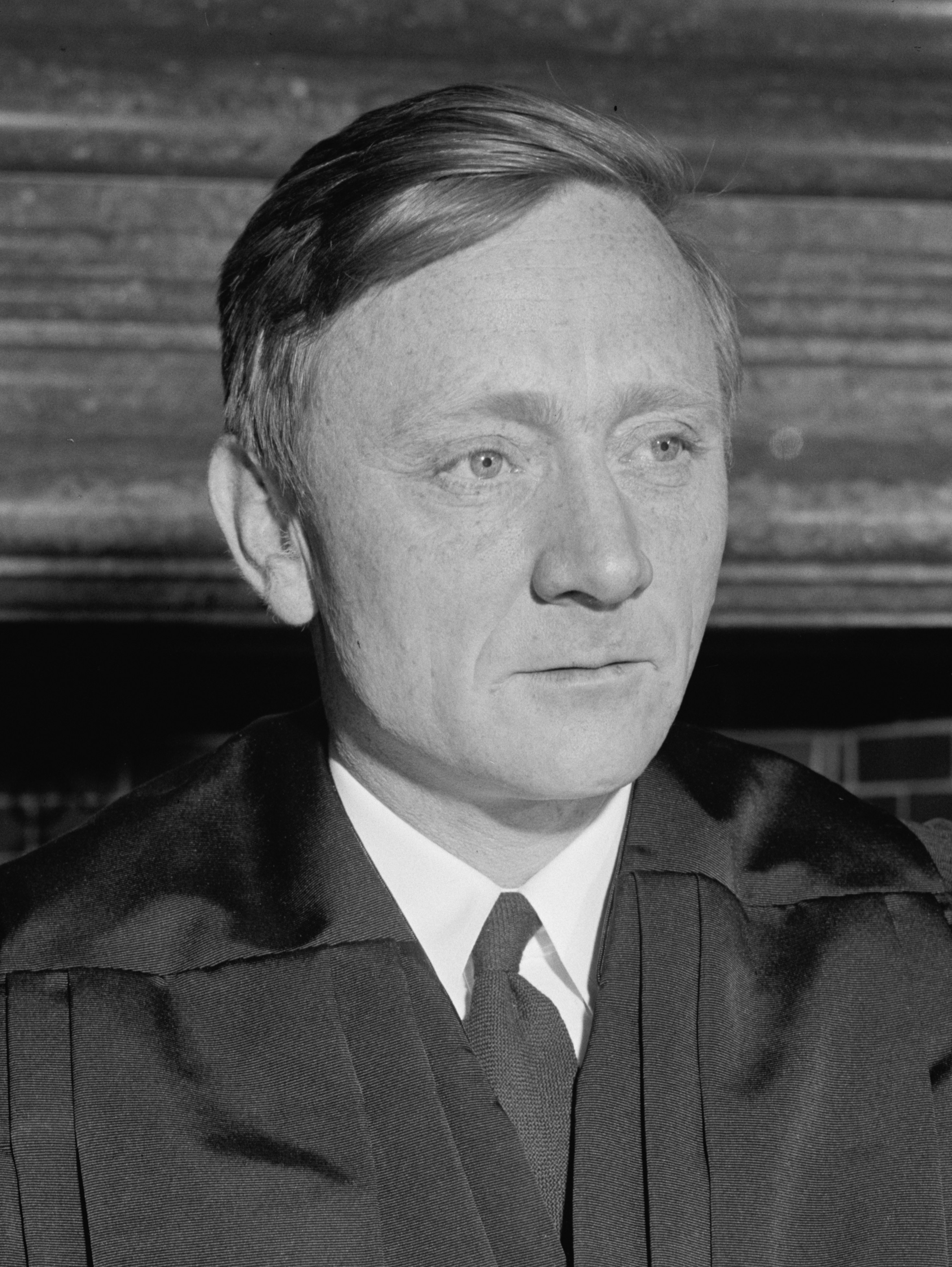
United States Supreme Court Associate Justice William O. Douglas delivered the opinion in Cuno (1941) that created the "flash of genius" doctrine.

In United States patent law, the flash of genius doctrine was a test for patentability used by the United States Federal Courts for just over a decade, beginning circa 1940.

== Origin ==
The doctrine was formalized by the Supreme Court's opinion in Cuno Engineering v. Automatic Devices (1941), which held that the inventive act had to come into the mind of an inventor in a "flash of genius" and not as a result of tinkering: "The new device, however useful it may be, must reveal the flash of creative genius, not merely the skill of the calling. If it fails, it has not established its right to a private grant on the public domain."

== Overturned ==
The test was eventually rejected by Congress in its 1952 revision of the patent statute, now codified in Title 35 of the United States Code. Section 103 was amended to state the new standard of non-obviousness: "Patentability shall not be negated by the manner in which the invention was made."

The United States Supreme Court acknowledged this new language in its landmark opinion on obviousness, Graham v. John Deere Co. (1966), noting that the language in Cuno establishing the doctrine had never been intended to create a new standard in the first instance.

== See also ==
- Cripps question, a question used to assess inventive step under UK patent law
- Epiphany (feeling), an illuminating realization or discovery
- Brainstorming
- Eureka effect, named from a famous legend that the ancient Greek polymath Archimedes, having found inspiration at a public bath, ran home naked, shouting "eureka" (I have found [the solution])
- Build a better mousetrap, and the world will beat a path to your door
