= Hotchkiss v. Greenwood =

- Supreme Court of the United States

Argued February 5–6, 1851 Decided February 19, 1851
- Full case name: Julia P. Hotchkiss, Executrix of John G. Hotchkiss, Deceased, John A. Davenport, and John W. Quincy, Plaintiffs in Error v. Miles Greenwood and Thomas Wood, Partners in Trade Under the Name of M. Greenwood & Co.
- Citations: 52 U.S. 248 (more) 11 How. 248; 13 L. Ed. 683; 1850 U.S. LEXIS 1507

Court membership
- Chief Justice Roger B. Taney Associate Justices John McLean · James M. Wayne; John Catron · John McKinley; Peter V. Daniel · Samuel Nelson; Levi Woodbury · Robert C. Grier

Case opinions
- Majority: Nelson, joined by Taney, McLean, Wayne, Catron, McKinley, Daniel, Grier
- Dissent: Woodbury

Hotchkiss v. Greenwood, 52 U.S. (11 How.) 248 (1851), was a United States Supreme Court decision credited with introducing into United States patent law the concept of non-obviousness as a patentability requirement, as well as stating the applicable legal standard for determining its presence or absence in a claimed invention.

The test of the Hotchkiss case may be described as: whether, at the time the claimed invention was made, the differences between the features of the claimed invention and the things that persons skilled in the relevant art already knew were such that it would have been within the level of skill of an ordinary artisan in that art to combine those known features to make the claimed invention.

More specifically, as stated in the Hotchkiss opinion, itself:

Unless more ingenuity and skill . . . were required . . . than were possessed by an ordinary mechanic acquainted with the business, there was an absence of that degree of skill and ingenuity which constitute essential elements of every invention. In other words, the improvement is the work of the skillful mechanic, not that of the inventor.

== Background ==
John G. Hotchkiss, John A. Davenport, and John W. Quincy obtained U.S. Patent No. 2197, on making or manufacturing knobs of potter's clay or porcelain. The patent asserted that they:

invented an improved method of making knobs for locks, doors, cabinet furniture, and for all other purposes for which wood and metal, or other material knobs, are used. This improvement consists in making said knobs of potter's clay, such as is used in any species of pottery; also of porcelain; the operation is the same as in pottery, by molding, turning, and burning and glazing; . . . the modes of fitting them for their application to doors, locks, furniture, and other uses, will be . . . chiefly predicated on one principle, that of having the cavity in which the screw or shank is inserted, by which they are fastened, largest at the bottom of its depth, in form of a dovetail, and a screw formed therein by pouring in metal in a fused state.

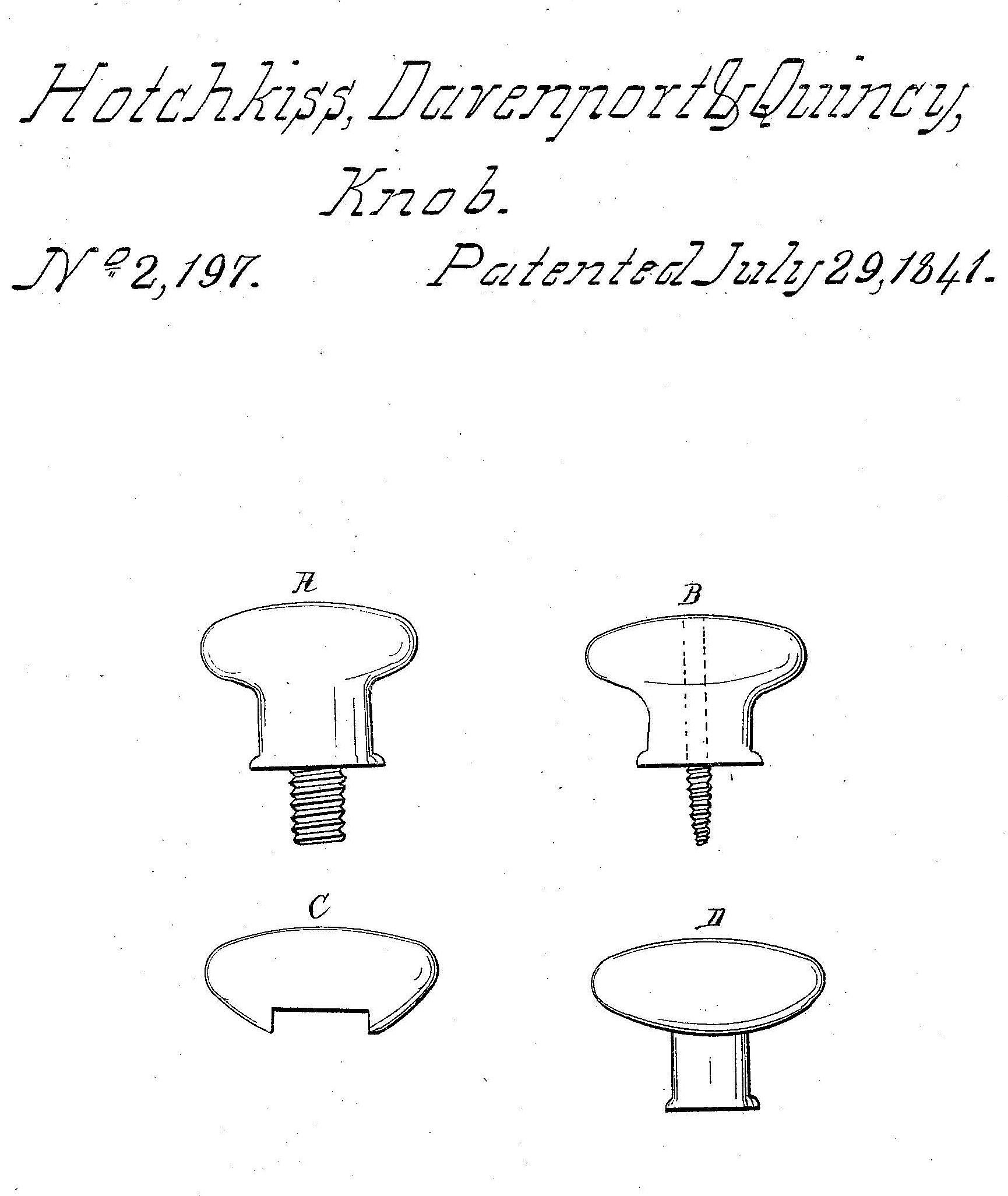
The patented doorknob – from U.S. Pat. No. 2197

The clay or porcelain knob, by itself, was apparently known and used in the United States prior to the invention and patent, and the shank and spindle, by which the knob is attached, including the use of the dovetail and the infusions of melted metal, were also so known and used. But the shank and spindle, the inventors contended, had never before been attached to a knob made of potter's clay or porcelain (rather than to a metal or wooden knob).

== Lower court ruling ==
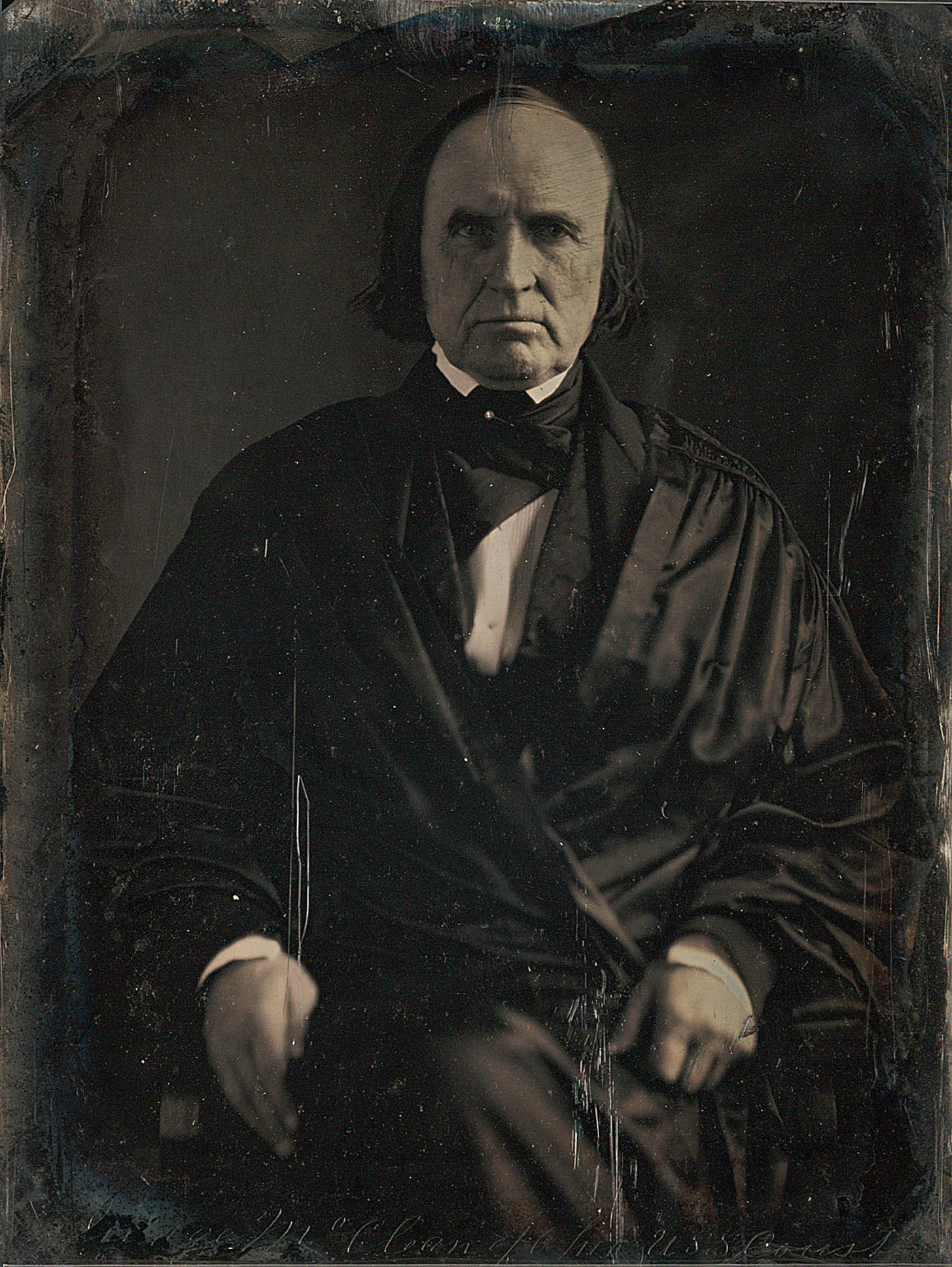
Justice John McLean – 1849

In Hotchkiss v. Greenwood, 12 F. Cas. 551 (C.C.D. Ohio 1848), the circuit court for Ohio upheld a jury verdict for the defendants. Justice John McLean, sitting as circuit justice, presided. The most controversial issue, subsequently the subject of the appeal, was plaintiffs' request for a charge to the jury, which McLean refused, to the effect that:

[If the] shank and spindle had never before been attached to a knob made of potter's clay or porcelain, and if it required skill and thought and invention to attach the said knob of clay to the metal shank and spindle, so that the same would unite firmly, and make a solid and substantial article of manufacture, and if the said knob of clay or porcelain so attached were an article better and cheaper than the knob theretofore manufactured of metal or other materials, that the patent was valid.

McLean, on the contrary instructed the jury:

[I]f knobs of the same form, and for the same purposes with that described by the plaintiffs in their [patent] specifications, made of metal or other material, had been known and used in the United States prior to the alleged invention and patent of the plaintiffs, and if the spindle and shank, in the form used by the plaintiffs, had before that time been publicly known and used in the United States, and had been theretofore attached to metallic knobs by means of the dovetail and the infusions of melted metal, as the same is directed in the specification of the plaintiffs to be attached to the knob of potter's clay or porcelain, so that if the knob of clay or porcelain is the mere substitution of one material for another, and the spindle and shank be such as were theretofore in common use, and the mode of connecting them to the knob by dovetail be the same that was theretofore in use in the United States, the material being in common use, and no other ingenuity or skill being necessary to construct the knob than that of an ordinary mechanic acquainted with the business, the patent is void, and the plaintiffs are not entitled to recover.

== Supreme Court ruling ==
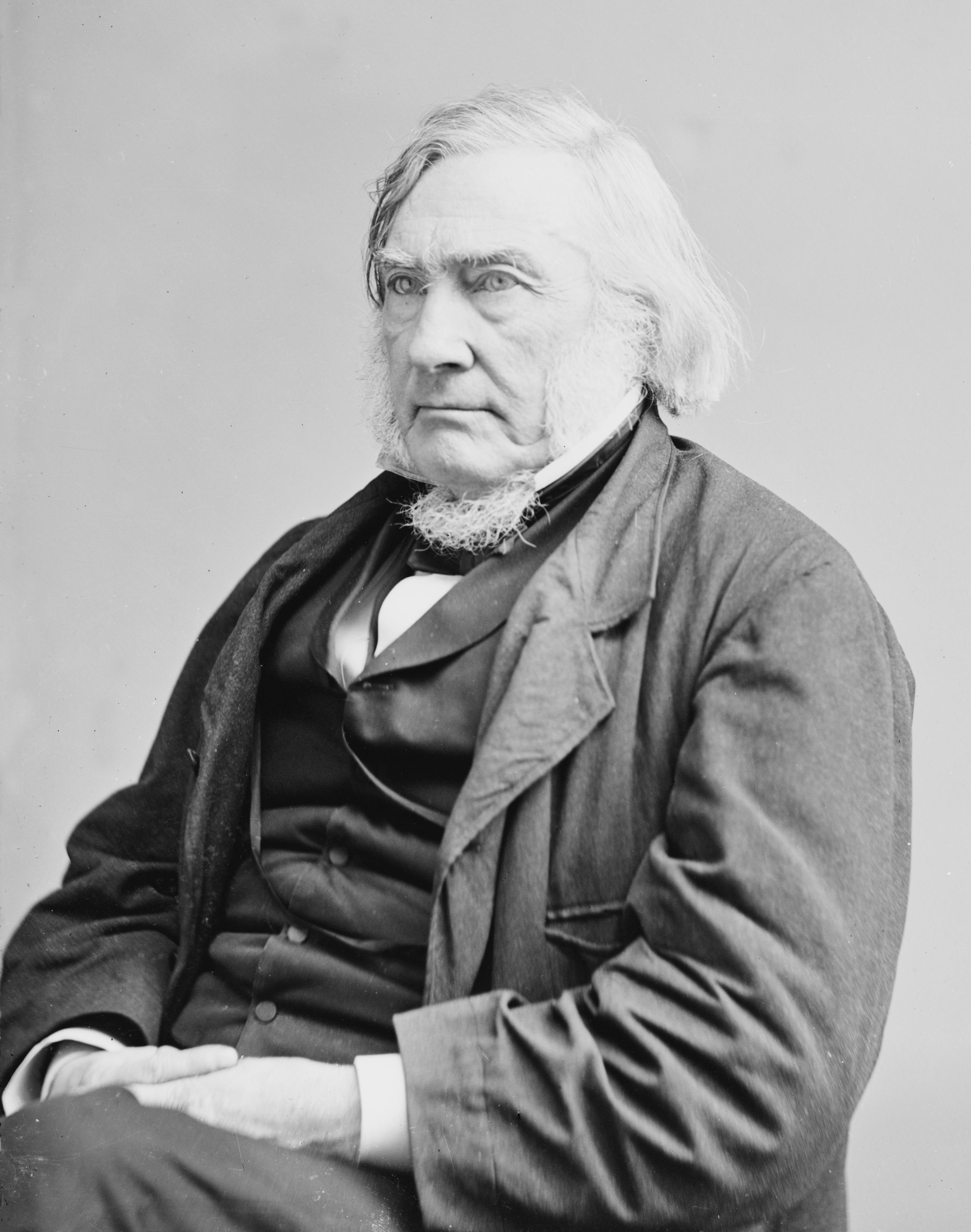
Justice Samuel Nelson

Justice Samuel Nelson delivered the opinion for an 8-1 Court. Justice Levi Woodbury dissented.

=== Majority opinion ===
Counsel for the plaintiffs conceded that "knobs had been in use many hundred years; potter's ware and porcelain, many thousand," but insisted that "no one ever before succeeded in uniting the clay and the iron so as to make of the two a substantial and useful article," because there "are many difficulties in uniting them," and it required skill and thought and invention to unite them." Moreover, the new doorknobs were "cheaper and better than any like article ever before known." They were a great commercial success and are replacing metal knob everywhere.

The Court found these arguments unavailing. It was established "that knobs of metal, wood, etc., connected with a shank and spindle, in the mode and by the means used by the patentees in their manufacture, had been before known, and were in public use." Clay doorknobs were old too. Hence, "the only novelty which could be claimed on their part was the adaptation of this old contrivance to knobs of potter's clay or porcelain; in other words, the novelty consisted in the substitution of the clay knob in the place of one made of metal or wood."

Therefore, McLean's charge to the jury was correct, "for unless more ingenuity and skill in applying the old method of fastening the shank and the knob were required in the application of it to the clay or porcelain knob than were possessed by an ordinary mechanic acquainted with the business, there was an absence of that degree of skill and ingenuity which constitute essential elements of every invention." The patent is invalid because: "In other words, the improvement is the work of the skillful mechanic, not that of the inventor."

=== Dissenting opinion ===
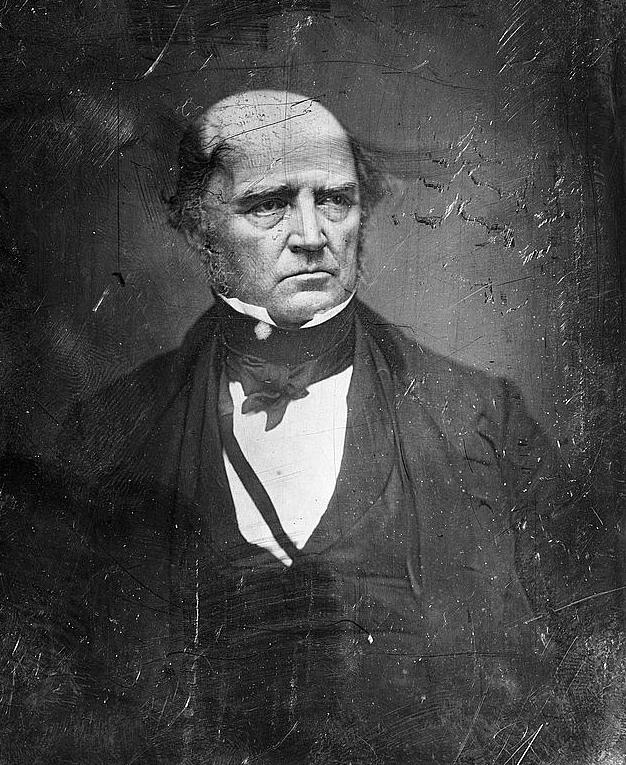
Justice Levi Woodbury

Justice Woodbury disagreed. He focused on the last aspect of the rejected charge. The patentees sought an instruction that "if the said knob of clay or porcelain so attached were an article better and cheaper than the knob theretofore manufactured of metal or other materials, the patent was valid." He considered the "ordinary mechanic" test incorrect for determining whether the claimed invention was patentable, "whereas in my view the true test of its being patentable was, if the invention was new, and better and cheaper than what preceded it." If the new device

was in truth better and cheaper than what had preceded it for this purpose, it would surely be an improvement. It would be neither frivolous nor useless, and under all the circumstances it is manifest that the skill necessary to construct it, on which both the court below and the Court here rely, is an immaterial inquiry, or it is entirely subordinate to the question whether the invention was not cheaper and better.

Woodbury concluded: "And why is not he a benefactor to the community, and to be encouraged by protection, who invents a use of so cheap an earth as clay for knobs, or in a new form or combination, by which the community are largely gainers?"

== Post-Hotchkiss developments ==
In the 1875 decision Reckendorfer v. Faber, the Court considered and reaffirmed the Hotchkiss decision. The Court described the invention in these terms:

The claim is simply of the combination of the lead and india-rubber in the holder of a drawing-pencil; in other words, the use of an ordinary lead pencil, in one end of which, and for about one-fourth of its length, is inserted a strip of india-rubber, glued to one side of the pencil.

Like Hotchkiss's doorknob, the eraser glued to a pencil was the product of mere mechanical skill and therefore unpatentable:

An instrument or manufacture which is the result of mechanical skill merely is not patentable. Mechanical skill is one thing; invention is a different thing. Perfection of workmanship, however much it may increase the convenience, extend the use, or diminish expense, is not patentable.

Similarly in 1883 in Atlantic Works v. Brady, the Court used language like that of Hotchkiss in invalidating a patent: "It was never the object of those laws to grant a monopoly for every trifling device, every shadow of a shade of an idea, which would naturally and spontaneously occur to any skilled mechanic or operator in the ordinary progress of manufactures."

In the 1891 decision in Magowan v. New York Belting & Packing Co., the Court again echoed Hotchkiss – in upholding a patent as valid: "[Wihat Gately did was not merely the work of a skilled mechanic, who applied only his common knowledge and experience, and perceived the reason of the failure of [previous inventions], and supplied what was obviously wanting; and that the present case involves . . . the creative work of the inventive faculty."

In Mast, Foos, & Co. v. Stover Mfg. Co., a few years later, the Court used the Hotchkiss "skillful mechanic" test to invalidate patent, and explained what a skilled mechanic is presumed to know – namely, all of the relevant prior art:

The line between invention and mechanical skill is often an exceedingly difficult one to draw, but in view of the state of the art as heretofore shown, we cannot say that the application of this old device to a use which was only new in the particular machine to which it was applied was anything more than would have been suggested to an intelligent mechanic who had before him the patents to which we have called attention. While it is entirely true that the fact that this change had not occurred to any mechanic familiar with windmills is evidence of something more than mechanical skill in the person who did discover it, it is probable that no one of these was fully aware of the state of the art and the prior devices, but, as before stated, in determining the question of invention, we must presume the patentee was fully informed of everything which preceded him, whether such were the actual fact or not.

The Court's standard for what was ordinary mechanical skill rose and fell over the years, but began to become more strict after the Great Depression and New Deal. Thus, in Cuno Engineering Corp. v. Automatic Devices Corp. in 1941, the Court veered away from Hotchkiss to invalidate an automatic cigarette lighter for cars that used a thermostat to pop out the lighter so that the user did not have to hold it in place in the socket until it heated sufficiently. In the Second Circuit, Judge Learned Hand had held the device patentable, ruling in an echo of Hotchkiss, "If patents are to go to those who contribute new appliances that are beyond the limited imagination of the ordinary skilled person, this invention seems to us to merit a patent." On appeal, the Court's opinion (per Douglas, J.) applied Hotchkiss differently to the facts:

Since Hotchkiss v. Greenwood, decided in 1851, it has been recognized that if an improvement is to obtain the privileged position of a patent more Ingenuity must be involved than the work of a mechanic skilled in the art. . . . The principle of the Hotchkiss case applies to the adaptation or combination of old or well known devices for new uses.

Then the Cuno Court revived Reckendorfer mixed with Atlantic Works mixed with Hotchkiss, by adding:

[T]he new device, however useful it may be, must reveal the flash of creative genius not merely the skill of the calling. If it fails, it has not established its right to a private grant on the public domain . . . We cannot conclude that his skill in making this contribution reached the level of inventive genius which the Constitution authorizes Congress to reward. . . . Ingenuity was required to effect the adaptation, but no more than that to be expected of a mechanic skilled in the art. Strict application of that test is necessary lest in the constant demand for new appliances the heavy hand of tribute be laid on each slight technological advance in an art.

Subsequent cases in this period used similar language.

In 1952 came Great Atlantic & Pacific Tea Co. v. Supermarket Equipment Corp., the last of the cases preceding the enactment of the 1952 patent act codifying Hotchkiss as the legal standard for patentability. In the A&P case, the claimed invention was a rack or frame with three sides and no top or bottom, which could be used to pull groceries along a counter beside a cash register. All the elements of the claimed combination were old and operated in a similar fashion to how they acted in the past. The Court said:

The conjunction or concert of known elements must contribute something; only when the whole in some way exceeds the sum of its parts is the accumulation of old devices patentable. Elements may, of course, especially in chemistry or electronics, take on some new quality or function from being brought into concert, but this is not a usual result of uniting elements old in mechanics. This case is wanting in any unusual or surprising consequences from the unification of the elements here concerned, and there is nothing to indicate that the lower courts scrutinized the claims in the light of this rather severe test.

In a concurring opinion, Justice Douglas collected a list of cases in which the Court had interpreted the Hotchkiss test for invention to require a level of skill embodying "inventive genius":

- Reckendorfer v. Faber, 92 U. S. 347, 357 – "Genius or invention"
- Smith v. Whitman Saddle Co., 148 U.S. 674, 681 – "Intuitive genius"
- Potts v. Creager, 155 U.S. 597, 607 – "Inventive genius"
- Concrete Appliances Co. v. Gomery, 269 U.S. 177, 185 "Inventive genius
- Mantle Lamp Co. of America v. Aluminum Products Co., 301 U.S. 544, 546
- Cuno Engineering Corp. v. Automatic Devices Corp., 314 U.S. 84, 91 – "the flash of creative genius, not merely the skill of the calling."

One commentator characterized the 1930–1952 period as "contain[ing] the Supreme Court's most critical attitude towards patents and patent monopolies." It was immediately followed by an amendment of the patent laws to codify a "nonobviousness" standard based on Hotchkiss to replace the "invention" standard previously used and intended to limit the requirement of genius.

== 1952 codification of Hotchkiss ==
As explained in the Supreme Court's opinion in Dawson Chemical Co. v. Rohm & Haas Co., the patent bar vigorously lobbied for a rollback of the Supreme Court decisions of the pre-1952 period or at least of the language that they used. Eventually it succeeded in persuading Congress to enact 35 U.S.C. § 103 as part of a codification of patent law, establishing the requirement of nonobviousness for patentability, using the language of Hotchkiss.

The new section provided:

A patent for a claimed invention may not be obtained, notwithstanding that the claimed invention is not identically disclosed as set forth in section 102, if the differences between the claimed invention and the prior art are such that the claimed invention as a whole would have been obvious before the effective filing date of the claimed invention to a person having ordinary skill in the art to which the claimed invention pertains. Patentability shall not be negated by the manner in which the invention was made.

The legislative history of new § 103 is discussed in Graham v. John Deere Co., discussed in the following section.

== Supreme Court rulings from Graham to KSR ==
=== Graham ===
The first Supreme Court decision interpreting the 1952 codification of Hotchkiss was Graham v. John Deere Co., in which the Court explained that the inherent problem in formulating conditions for patentability "was to develop some means of weeding out those inventions which would not be disclosed or devised but for the inducement of a patent." The Court added that "Hotchkiss, by positing the condition that a patentable invention evidence more ingenuity and skill than that possessed by an ordinary mechanic acquainted with the business, merely distinguished between new and useful innovations that were capable of sustaining a patent and those that were not." But the Hotchkiss test merely "laid the cornerstone of the judicial evolution" necessary to define the conditions for patentability. The value of the Hotchkiss formulation was "in its functional approach to questions of patentability. In practice, Hotchkiss has required a comparison between the subject matter of the patent, or patent application, and the background skill of the calling. It has been from this comparison that patentability was in each case determined."

According to the Graham decision, the major distinction between the language of Hotchkiss and that of § 103 "is that Congress has emphasized 'nonobviousness' as the operative test of the section, rather than the less definite 'invention' language of Hotchkiss that Congress thought had led to 'a large variety' of expressions in decisions and writings." The meaning of § 103 is the same as that of court decisions since Hotchkiss "for more than 100 years": A claimed invention may not be patentable even if novel "if the difference between the new thing and what was known before is not considered sufficiently great to warrant a patent."

The Court then explained that the statutory codification of Hotchkiss did not sweep away 100 years of precedents since Hotchkiss. The Court explained:

It is undisputed that this section was, for the first time, a statutory expression of an additional requirement for patentability, originally expressed in Hotchkiss. It also seems apparent that Congress intended by the last sentence of § 103 to abolish the test it believed this Court announced in the controversial phrase "flash of creative genius," used in Cuno Engineering Corp. v. Automatic Devices Corp.

But it would be erroneous, the Court further explained, to accept the contentions "by some of the parties and by several of the amici that the first sentence of § 103 was intended to sweep away judicial precedents and to lower the level of patentability." Rather:

We believe that this legislative history, as well as other sources, show that the revision was not intended by Congress to change the general level of patentable invention. We conclude that the section was intended merely as a codification of judicial precedents embracing the Hotchkiss condition, with congressional directions that inquiries into the obviousness of the subject matter sought to be patented are a prerequisite to patentability.

The Court concluded its explanation of the meaning of § 103 with this instruction:

[I]t bears repeating that we find no change in the general strictness with which the overall test is to be applied. We have been urged to find in § 103 a relaxed standard, supposedly a congressional reaction to the "increased standard" applied by this Court in its decisions over the last 20 or 30 years. The standard has remained invariable in this Court.

=== Anderson's Black Rock ===
The next Supreme Court obviousness case after Graham was Anderson's-Black Rock, Inc. v. Pavement Salvage Co., in which the Court invalidated a patent on a road-mending device. The device was a combination of old devices, in which each component performed the same function as it had in the past. The Court concluded:

[W]hile the combination of old elements performed a useful function, it added nothing to the nature and quality of the radiant-heat burner already patented. We conclude further that to those skilled in the art the use of the old elements in combination was not an invention by the obvious-nonobvious standard.

=== Johnston ===
The next Supreme Court case addressing obviousness was Dann v. Johnston, in which the Court upheld the rejection of claims to a method of creating records of bank checks for expenditures in different categories, such as rent, wages, cost of materials, etc. so that income taxes could more readily be calculated. The Court explained that the applicable standard for nonobviousness had not been satisfied:

[T]he mere existence of differences between the prior art and an invention does not establish the invention's nonobviousness. The gap between the prior art and respondent's system is simply not so great as to render the system nonobvious to one reasonably skilled in the art.

=== Sakraida ===
Three weeks after Johnston, the Court decided Sakraida v. Ag Pro, Inc. The Court instructed:

It has long been clear that the Constitution requires that there be some "invention" to be entitled to patent protection. Dann v. Johnston. As we explained in Hotchkiss v. Greenwood:

[U]nless more ingenuity and skill . . . were required . . . than were possessed by an ordinary mechanic acquainted with the business, there was an absence of that degree of skill and ingenuity which constitute essential elements of every invention. In other words, the improvement is the work of the skillful mechanic, not that of the inventor.

Applying this legal standard, the Court held the patent invalid as obvious under § 103.

=== KSR ===
Three decades later, the Supreme Court most recently revisited the obviousness standard. In KSR International Co. v. Teleflex Inc., the Court rejected the Federal Circuit's approach to determining obviousness as insufficiently faithful to the Hotchkiss standard as explained in Graham v. Deere. The Federal Circuit had been using a "rigid" test known as "the 'teaching, suggestion, or motivation' test (TSM test), under which a patent claim is only proved obvious if 'some motivation or suggestion to combine the prior art teachings' can be found in the prior art, the nature of the problem, or the knowledge of a person having ordinary skill in the art." "Throughout this Court's engagement with the question of obviousness," the Court instructed, "our cases have set forth an expansive and flexible approach" based on Hotchkiss and "inconsistent with the way the Court of Appeals applied its TSM test here." The Court also criticized the Federal Circuit's treatment of patents on combinations of old elements in which the elements performed the same function as they always did, thus ignoring the emphasis in Hotchkiss on "functionality," as reaffirmed in Graham.

The Court explained, quoting the A&P Tea case:

For over a half century, the Court has held that a "patent for a combination which only unites old elements with no change in their respective functions . . . obviously withdraws what already is known into the field of its monopoly and diminishes the resources available to skillful men." Great Atlantic & Pacific Tea Co. This is a principal reason for declining to allow patents for what is obvious. The combination of familiar elements according to known methods is likely to be obvious when it does no more than yield predictable results.

Applying these standards, the Court held the patent invalid for obviousness. It concluded by explaining that adherence to the Hotchkiss test is essential: "Were it otherwise patents might stifle, rather than promote, the progress of useful arts." And it admonished that the Federal Circuit had "analyzed the issue in a narrow, rigid manner inconsistent with § 103 and our precedents."
