= List of United States Supreme Court cases, volume 52 =

Supreme Court of the United States
- Interactive map of Supreme Court of the United States
- 38°53′26″N 77°00′16″W
- Established: March 4, 1789; 236 years ago
- Location: Washington, D.C.
- Coordinates: 38°53′26″N 77°00′16″W
- Composition method: Presidential nomination with Senate confirmation
- Authorised by: Constitution of the United States, Art. III, § 1
- Judge term length: life tenure, subject to impeachment and removal
- Number of positions: 9 (by statute)
- Website: supremecourt.gov

This is a list of cases reported in volume 52 (11 How.) of United States Reports, decided by the Supreme Court of the United States in 1850 and 1851.

== Nominative reports ==
In 1874, the U.S. government created the United States Reports, and retroactively numbered older privately published case reports as part of the new series. As a result, cases appearing in volumes 1–90 of U.S. Reports have dual citation forms; one for the volume number of U.S. Reports, and one for the volume number of the reports named for the relevant reporter of decisions (these are called "nominative reports").

=== Benjamin Chew Howard ===
Starting with the 42nd volume of U.S. Reports, the Reporter of Decisions of the Supreme Court of the United States was Benjamin Chew Howard. Howard was Reporter of Decisions from 1843 to 1860, covering volumes 42 through 65 of United States Reports which correspond to volumes 1 through 24 of his Howard's Reports. As such, the dual form of citation to, for example, United States v. City of Philadelphia is 52 U.S. (11 How.) 609 (1851).

== Justices of the Supreme Court at the time of 52 U.S. (11 How.) ==
The Supreme Court is established by Article III, Section 1 of the Constitution of the United States, which says: "The judicial Power of the United States, shall be vested in one supreme Court . . .". The size of the Court is not specified; the Constitution leaves it to Congress to set the number of justices. Under the Judiciary Act of 1789 Congress originally fixed the number of justices at six (one chief justice and five associate justices). Since 1789 Congress has varied the size of the Court from six to seven, nine, ten, and back to nine justices (always including one chief justice).

When the cases in 52 U.S. (11 How.) were decided the Court comprised these nine members:

Portrait	Justice	Office	Home State	Succeeded	Date confirmed by the Senate (Vote)	Tenure on Supreme Court
	Roger B. Taney	Chief Justice	Maryland	John Marshall	March 15, 1836 (29–15)	March 28, 1836 – October 12, 1864 (Died)
	John McLean	Associate Justice	Ohio	Robert Trimble	March 7, 1829 (Acclamation)	January 11, 1830 – April 4, 1861 (Died)
	James Moore Wayne	Associate Justice	Georgia	William Johnson	January 9, 1835 (Acclamation)	January 14, 1835 – July 5, 1867 (Died)
	John Catron	Associate Justice	Tennessee	newly created seat	March 8, 1837 (28–15)	May 1, 1837 – May 30, 1865 (Died)
	John McKinley	Associate Justice	Alabama	newly created seat	September 25, 1837 (Acclamation)	January 9, 1838 – July 19, 1852 (Died)
	Peter Vivian Daniel	Associate Justice	Virginia	Philip P. Barbour	March 2, 1841 (25–5)	January 10, 1842 – May 31, 1860 (Died)
	Samuel Nelson	Associate Justice	New York	Smith Thompson	February 14, 1845 (Acclamation)	February 27, 1845 – November 28, 1872 (Retired)
	Levi Woodbury	Associate Justice	New Hampshire	Joseph Story	January 31, 1846 (Acclamation)	September 23, 1845 – September 4, 1851 (Died)
	Robert Cooper Grier	Associate Justice	Pennsylvania	Henry Baldwin	August 4, 1846 (Acclamation)	August 10, 1846 – January 31, 1870 (Retired)

== Notable case in 52 U.S. (11 How.) ==
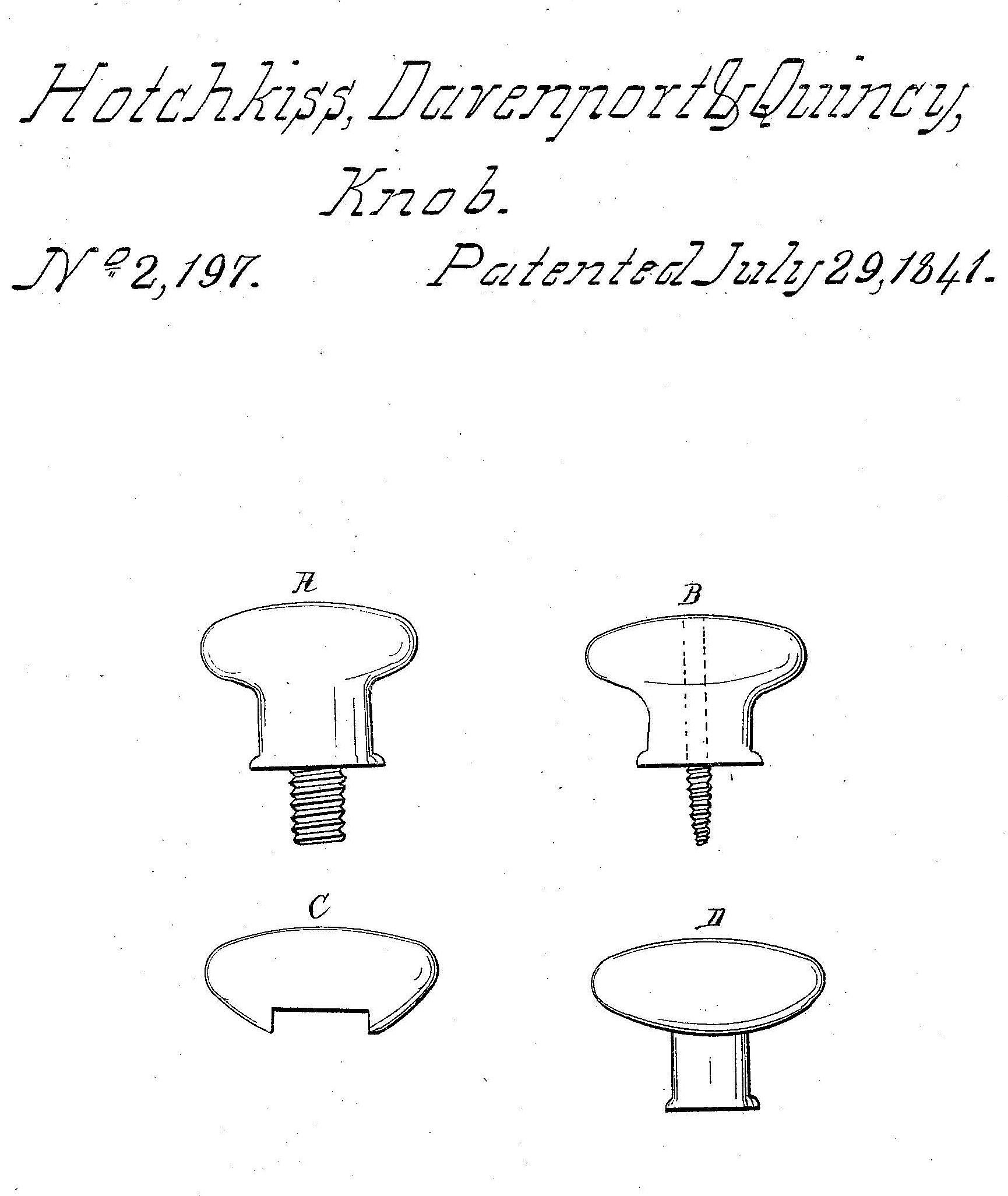
The patented doorknob – from U.S. Pat. No. 2197

=== Hotchkiss v. Greenwood ===
Hotchkiss v. Greenwood, 52 U.S. (11 How.) 248 (1851), is a Supreme Court decision credited with introducing into United States patent law the concept of non-obviousness as a patentability requirement, as well as stating the applicable legal standard for determining its presence or absence in a claimed invention.

== Citation style ==
Under the Judiciary Act of 1789 the federal court structure at the time comprised District Courts, which had general trial jurisdiction; Circuit Courts, which had mixed trial and appellate (from the US District Courts) jurisdiction; and the United States Supreme Court, which had appellate jurisdiction over the federal District and Circuit courts—and for certain issues over state courts. The Supreme Court also had limited original jurisdiction (i.e., in which cases could be filed directly with the Supreme Court without first having been heard by a lower federal or state court). There were one or more federal District Courts and/or Circuit Courts in each state, territory, or other geographical region.

Bluebook citation style is used for case names, citations, and jurisdictions.

- "C.C.D." = United States Circuit Court for the District of . . .
  - e.g.,"C.C.D.N.J." = United States Circuit Court for the District of New Jersey
- "D." = United States District Court for the District of . . .
  - e.g.,"D. Mass." = United States District Court for the District of Massachusetts
- "E." = Eastern; "M." = Middle; "N." = Northern; "S." = Southern; "W." = Western
  - e.g.,"C.C.S.D.N.Y." = United States Circuit Court for the Southern District of New York
  - e.g.,"M.D. Ala." = United States District Court for the Middle District of Alabama
- "Ct. Cl." = United States Court of Claims
- The abbreviation of a state's name alone indicates the highest appellate court in that state's judiciary at the time.
  - e.g.,"Pa." = Supreme Court of Pennsylvania
  - e.g.,"Me." = Supreme Judicial Court of Maine

== List of cases in 52 U.S. (11 How.) ==
Case Name	Page and year	Opinion of the Court	Concurring opinion(s)	Dissenting opinion(s)	Lower court	Disposition of case
Gratz's Ex'rs v. Cohen	1 (1851)	Woodbury	none	none	C.C.E.D. Pa.	reversed
United States v. Girault	22 (1851)	Nelson	none	none	N.D. Miss.	dismissed
Oakey v. Bennett	33 (1851)	McLean	none	none	D. Tex.	affirmed
United States v. Guillem	47 (1851)	Taney	none	none	C.C.D. La.	affirmed
United States v. Boisdore	63 (1851)	Catron	none	McLean, Wayne	S.D. Miss.	reversed
Blanc v. Lafayette	104 (1851)	Wayne	none	none	La.	affirmed
Lecompte v. United States	115 (1851)	Daniel	none	none	D. La.	affirmed
McCoy v. Rhodes	131 (1851)	Catron	none	none	C.C.D. La.	reversed
McGill v. Armour	142 (1851)	McLean	none	none	C.C.D.C.	affirmed
United States v. Morgan	154 (1851)	Woodbury	none	none	C.C.D. La.	reversed
Gruner v. United States	163 (1851)	Taney	none	none	D. Tex.	dismissed
D'Arcy v. Ketchum	165 (1851)	Catron	none	none	C.C.D. La.	reversed
Hortsman v. Henshaw	177 (1851)	Taney	none	none	C.C.D. Mass.	affirmed
League v. de Young	185 (1851)	Grier	none	none	Tex.	affirmed
Bevins ex rel. Earle v. Ramsey	185 (1851)	per curiam	none	none	C.C.D.E. Tenn.	dismissed
Brooks v. Norris	204 (1851)	Taney	none	none	La.	dismissed
Warner v. Martin	209 (1851)	Wayne	none	none	C.C.E.D. Pa.	affirmed
Cotton v. United States	229 (1851)	Grier	none	none	N.D. Fla.	affirmed
Stockton v. Ford	232 (1851)	Nelson	none	none	C.C.D. La.	affirmed
Hotchkiss v. Greenwood	248 (1851)	Nelson	none	Woodbury	C.C.D. Ohio	affirmed
Reeside v. Walker	272 (1851)	Woodbury	none	none	C.C.D.C.	affirmed
Florida v. Georgia	293 (1851)	per curiam	none	none	original	subpoena issued
Phillips v. Preston	294 (1851)	per curiam	none	none	C.C.E.D. La.	certification
Hogan v. Ross ex rel. Patterson	294 (1851)	Taney	none	none	N.D. Miss.	supersedeas denied
Van Rensselaer v. Kearney	297 (1851)	Nelson	none	none	C.C.S.D.N.Y.	affirmed
Weatherhead's Lessee v. Baskerville	329 (1851)	Wayne	none	none	C.C.M.D. Tenn.	reversed
Parks v. Ross	362 (1851)	Grier	none	none	C.C.D.C.	affirmed
Fowler v. Merrill	375 (1851)	Woodbury	none	none	C.C.D. Ark.	affirmed
Clements v. Berry	398 (1851)	McLean	none	Catron	Tenn.	reversed
Moore v. Brown	414 (1851)	Wayne	none	Taney, Catron	C.C.D. Ill.	certification
Webster v. Reid	437 (1851)	McLean	none	none	Iowa	reversed
van Buren v. Digges	461 (1851)	Daniel	none	none	C.C.D.C.	reversed
Conrad v. Griffey	480 (1851)	Woodbury	none	none	C.C.D. La.	reversed
Randon v. Toby	493 (1851)	Grier	none	none	D. Tex.	affirmed
Spear v. Place	522 (1851)	Woodbury	none	none	D. Tex.	dismissed
Pennsylvania v. Wheeling & B.B. Co.	528 (1851)	per curiam	none	none	original	continued
Gill v. Oliver's Ex'rs	529 (1851)	Grier	Woodbury	Taney	Md.	dismissed
United States v. Hughes	552 (1851)	Catron	none	none	C.C.D. La.	reversed
United States v. Power's Heirs	570 (1851)	Catron	none	none	S.D. Miss.	reversed
Larman v. Tisdale's Heirs	586 (1851)	Taney	none	none	not indicated	dismissal denied
Hogg v. Emerson	587 (1850)	Woodbury	none	Catron	C.C.S.D.N.Y.	affirmed
United States v. City of Philadelphia	609 (1851)	Catron	none	McLean	D. La.	reversed
United States v. Turner	663 (1851)	Taney	none	none	D. La.	reversed
Bennett v. Butterworth	669 (1851)	Taney	none	none	D. Tex.	reversed

== See also ==
- Certificate of division
