= Amazon.com, Inc. v. Barnesandnoble.com, Inc. =

2001 U.S. Federal Court Case

Amazon. com, Inc. v. Barnesandnoble. com, Inc.
- Court: United States Court of Appeals for the Federal Circuit
- Decided: February 14, 2001
- Citation: 239 F.3d 1343

Holding
- Designs for check-out systems at e-commerce sites are eligible for patent protection, but infringement claims against competitors require evidence of obviousness and prior art.

Court membership
- Judges sitting: Raymond C. Clevenger, Arthur J. Gajarsa, Richard Linn

Case opinions
- Majority: Raymond C. Clevenger

Keywords
- patent law. e-commerce

Amazon. com, Inc. v. Barnesandnoble. com, Inc., 337 F.3d 1024 (Fed. Cir., 2001), was a court ruling at the United States Court of Appeals for the Federal Circuit. The ruling was an important early cyberlaw precedent on the matter of the technologies that enable e-commerce and whether such technologies are eligible for patent protection.

== Background ==
E-commerce, or the practice of ordering merchandise over the Internet, arose in the late 1990s with Amazon and Barnes & Noble both emerging as early leaders in the marketplace. Online retailers learned that customers could be discouraged from making purchases when confronted with lengthy check-out procedures when trying to finalize their purchases. In September 1997, Amazon developed its "One-Click" process in which a customer could complete a purchase with a single mouse click, while the website processed a credit card number that had already been stored in the customer's profile. Amazon received a patent for its One-Click technology in September 1999.

The following month, Amazon filed suit against Barnes & Noble, which had recently begun using a similar single-click process, known as "Express Lane", at its website. Amazon claimed that Barnes & Noble had infringed on its patent.

== District court proceedings ==
The case was first heard at the District Court for the Western District of Washington. Amazon sought a preliminary injunction to prevent Barnes & Noble from using its single-click ordering process, claiming patent infringement. Amazon also claimed that its One-Click design qualified as prior art, and was an inventive and original design under U.S patent law.

Barnes & Noble replied that Amazon's patent for its One-Click process was invalid due to the obviousness of the technology, as it was based on a simple mouse click and server-side processing which were common designs on the World Wide Web. Barnes & Noble also argued that Amazon had not demonstrated any irreparable harm nor whether an injunction against the Barnes & Noble technology would serve the public interest.

The district court sided with Amazon, per expert testimony that the company's One-Click technique was original and inventive, while concluding that it was a non-obvious invention because Amazon had been the first e-commerce company to specifically tackle the problem of customer fatigue during lengthy check-out processes. Furthermore, the court held that Amazon would suffer irreparable harm, which "could not easily be measured in dollars", due to the likelihood of consumer confusion and an inability to distinguish its invention from that of its competitors, including Barnes & Noble.

Thus, the district court ruled that Barnes & Noble had infringed on Amazon's patented One-Click technology, and issued an injunction that ordered Barnes & Noble to stop using its similar Express Lane technique immediately. This injunction was found to be in the public interest, because "The public has a strong interest in the enforcement of intellectual property rights." This ruling was handed down in December 1999, with the district court acknowledging the need to address the patent dispute during the 1999 holiday shopping season, which was the first in which e-commerce became a significant tool for American consumers.

Barnes & Noble appealed this decision to the Federal Circuit Appeals Court, which specializes in patent disputes.

== Circuit court opinion ==
The Federal Circuit reviewed the lower court's decision in early 2001. The circuit court vacated the lower court ruling and removed the injunction against use of Barnes & Noble's Express Lane technology.

Barnes & Noble argued on appeal that the district court had erred in its interpretation of irreparable harm and the public interest when handing down the injunction, while arguing that its Express Lane design was not an infringement on Amazon's patent for its One-Click design. The circuit court held that Amazon's One-Click process was not sufficiently different from previous online "shopping cart" designs, such as one developed by CompuServe in the mid-1990s, for Amazon to claim non-obviousness and prior art in its patent application. This invalidated much of Amazon's patent infringement claim, because Barnes & Noble's Express Lane could not be considered an unauthorized copy. The circuit court held that while Amazon could argue other types of infringement under U.S. patent law, its arguments in the present case were not strong enough to justify the injunction against Barnes & Noble's Express Lane technique.

Thus, the circuit court lifted the injunction against Express Lane, and remanded the case back to the district court for further hearings on Amazon's other patent infringement claims. That matter was eventually settled out of court.

== Impact ==
Amazon. com, Inc. v. Barnesandnoble. com, Inc. has been cited as an important early precedent on the applicability of patent law to website designs and e-commerce, as some designs may appear to be unique but are not non-obvious enough to receive patent protection. While the ruling was criticized in some quarters for demanding too much creativity and uniqueness for limited design options on the World Wide Web, it also received some praise for making it easier for consumers to navigate e-commerce without having to face different ordering processes at various e-commerce sites.
