= Netscape Communications Corp. v. Konrad =

2002 American ruling on distinct entities

- Court: United States Court of Appeals for the Federal Circuit
- Full case name: Netscape Communications Corporation, Microsoft Corporation, and America Online, Inc. v. Konrad
- Decided: July 9, 2002
- Citations: 295 F.3d 1315; 63 U.S.P.Q.2d 1580

Case history
- Prior history: Finding for plaintiff, Netscape Communications Corp. v. Konrad, No. 00-20789 (N. D. Cal. Apr. 2, 2001) (finding U.S. Patents No. 5,544,320, 5,696,901, and 5,974,444 invalid for public use and commercialization before bar date)
- Subsequent history: Rehearing denied, August 2, 2002

Holding
- Konrad's patents are ineligible for patent protection in the United States because they were publicly used and commercialized more than one year before the patent filing date.

Court membership
- Judges sitting: Haldane Robert Mayer, Pauline Newman, Sharon Prost

Laws applied
- 35 U.S.C. § 102

Keywords
- On-sale bar, Patent

Netscape Communications Corp. v. Konrad, 295 F.3d 1315 (Fed. Cir. 2002), was a decision of the United States Court of Appeals for the Federal Circuit. It affirmed that public use or commercialization of an invention more than one year before the filing date will cost the inventor his patent rights (see also 35 U.S.C. § 100-105). The inventor in this case was Allan M. Konrad, a Lawrence Berkeley National Laboratory employee who devised and implemented a method for accessing and searching data objects stored on a remote computer (U.S. patents 5,544,320; 5,696,901; 5,974,444). Netscape moved to invalidate Konrad's patents in U.S. district court immediately after Konrad filed a patent infringement suit against Netscape customers. The district court concluded that Konrad's patents were invalid because they did not meet the public-use and on-sale bar eligibility criteria of 35 U.S.C. § 102b. In particular, the district court found that Konrad (1) placed his invention in the public domain by demonstrating it to others without a confidentiality agreement and (2) tried to sell it to other legal entities, both more than one year before he filed for the patent. The appeals court, upon review, affirmed the district court decision for the same reasons.

== Background ==
Alan M. Konrad owns U.S patents 5,544,320; 5,696,901; 5,974,444; all concerning a system for accessing and searching a database residing on a remote computer. On February 8, 2000, Konrad filed a patent infringement suit in U.S. District Court for the Eastern District of Texas against thirty-nine customers of Netscape Communications Corp., including Microsoft Corp. and America Online, Inc. Netscape, acting in the interest of its customer relationships, asked the U.S. District Court for the Northern District of California to invalidate Konrad's patents via a declaratory judgment. Netscape argued that Konrad's system was in public use and on sale before Jan. 8, 1992—exactly one year before he filed the first patent for this invention. According to 35 U.S.C. § 102b, a patent is valid unless "the invention was patented or described in a printed publication in this or a foreign country or in public use or on sale in this country, more than one year before the date of the application for patent in the United States". Netscape prevailed in its argument; the district court judged the patent to be invalid on June 18, 2001. Konrad then appealed the decision to the U.S Court of Appeals for the Federal Circuit.

== Facts ==
Konrad began his employment at Lawrence Berkeley National Laboratory (LBNL) in 1977. On September 8, 1990, Konrad tested a method for searching a database residing on a remote computer. Shortly thereafter, Konrad disclosed his invention to LBNL's patent office (October 1990), but filed for the first of his three patents only on January 8, 1993, thus establishing a January 8, 1992 (i.e., one year prior) bar date for public use and sale under 35 U.S.C. § 102b. In the time between the first successful test and bar date, Konrad demonstrated his invention to University of California computing personnel without having them execute a confidentiality agreement, and offered to adapt his invention for use at the University Research Association Superconducting Super Collider Laboratory and Stanford Linear Accelerator Center in exchange for money.

== Issues ==
In his appeal, Konrad argued that the district court was wrong to conclude that his patents were invalid. In particular, he argued that he did not publicly use or attempt to sell his patents before the critical date, as required by 35 U.S.C. § 102b. By the legal precedent set in Petrolite Corp. v. Baker Hugher, Inc., An invention has been publicly used if it was used by "a person other than the inventor who is under no limitation, restriction or obligation of secrecy to the inventor". By legal precedent set in Group One, Ltd. v. Hallmark Cards, Inc., an invention has been offered for sale if "it rises to the level of a commercial offer for sale, one which the other party could make into a binding contract by simple acceptance." Furthermore, the sale must be between two separate legal entities per In re Caveney.

=== Public use ===
==== Konrad's argument ====
Konrad admitted demonstrating his invention before the critical date without explicitly communicating to his audience that it was confidential. Regardless, Konrad argued that this demonstration does not meet the public use criteria for three reasons. First, he argued that because LBNL and the demonstration audience were both funded by the U.S. Department of Energy, the invention disclosure he made to the LBNL patent office before the demonstration allowed for an implicit expectation of confidentiality. Second, he argued that the demonstration was an experiment and thus cannot be considered public use under legal precedent established in Baxter v. Cobe. Finally, he argued that he did not disclose every limitation of his invention.

==== Court's decision ====
The appeals court rejected all three of Konrad's arguments. First, the court noted that even though Konrad disclosed his invention to LBNL, a common funding source is not sufficient to carry an expectation of confidentiality. In particular, the contract between LBNL and the U.S. Department of Energy requires that LBNL "provide for the protection of government property", "safeguard restricted data" and to "provide written disclosures", but says nothing about the confidentiality of U.S. Department of Energy-funded projects.

Second, the court concluded that Konrad's demonstration cannot be considered an experiment because he provided "no objective evidence to support experimental use." Namely, Konrad failed to "maintain records of testing" and, in some cases, was not in full control of his invention—he let people try it out without monitoring them. In fact, the court used Konrad's own testimony that the purpose of the demonstration "was to convince the people that...there was a viable project" to conclude that he intended to gain endorsements rather than experimentation.

Finally, the court concluded that, even though Konrad may not have revealed every limitation, the difference between what was revealed and the actual invention would have been obvious to a person with reasonable technical skills. This, the court claimed, was supported by the legal precedent of Lough v. Brunswick Corp. Here the court leveraged Konrad's own testimony that the starter client used in the actual invention "is very similar to, if not the same as, software program icons created to quickly initiate a program", and hence can be easily derived from the demonstration, which featured initialization via a terminal.

=== On-sale bar ===
==== Konrad's argument ====
Konrad admitted to offering to adapt his invention for use at the University Research Association Superconducting Super Collider Laboratory and Stanford Linear Accelerator Center in return for compensation. However, Konrad argued that this was not a sale because those labs, just like his employer, LBNL, were funded by the Department of Energy and hence are the same legal entity. Then by precedent established in In re Caveney, he argued, the offer is not a sale, but a mere "accounting instrument used to track the transfer of research funds between two Department of Energy laboratories."

==== Court's decision ====
The appeals court rejected Konrad's argument. Legal precedent requires that in the case where seller and buyer are funded by the same entity, the existence of a sale depends on whether the funding agency can prohibit public disclosure. In this case, however, the court concluded that the Department of Energy doesn't exercise enough control over the labs to prevent them from leaking the invention to the public: "All indications are that the DoE funded specific projects at Lawrence Berkeley Laboratory, the Superconducting Super Collider Laboratory, and Stanford Linear Accelerator Center, but never exercised such control over them, as to render all part of the same entity."

== Impact ==
=== Separate entities ===
The application of the on-sale bar requires that the buyer and seller be "separate entities". However, before this case, what constitutes separate entities was considered by courts to be very vague. In fact, courts had traditionally used a "totality of circumstances" test (one in which all the facts are examined) to determine whether buyer and seller are indeed separate entities. A major impact of this case was that it clarified what it means to be separate entities. In particular, the Netscape appeals court formulated a test to determine whether buyer and seller are in fact two separate entities as follows:

Where, as in this case, both parties to an alleged commercial offer for sale, receive research funds from the same entity, it may be more difficult to determine whether the inventor is attempting to commercialize his invention. Accordingly, in such cases whether there is a bar depends on whether the seller so controls the purchaser that the invention remains out of the public's hands.

Despite the clarification, the test still requires a fact-based analysis of the degree to which one entity "controls" the other. In Netscape, the fact that the Department of Energy does not hold the national labs to a confidentiality agreement (at least, not to non-funded projects) was deemed a lack of control.
