= Samuel Nelson =

US Supreme Court justice from 1845 to 1872

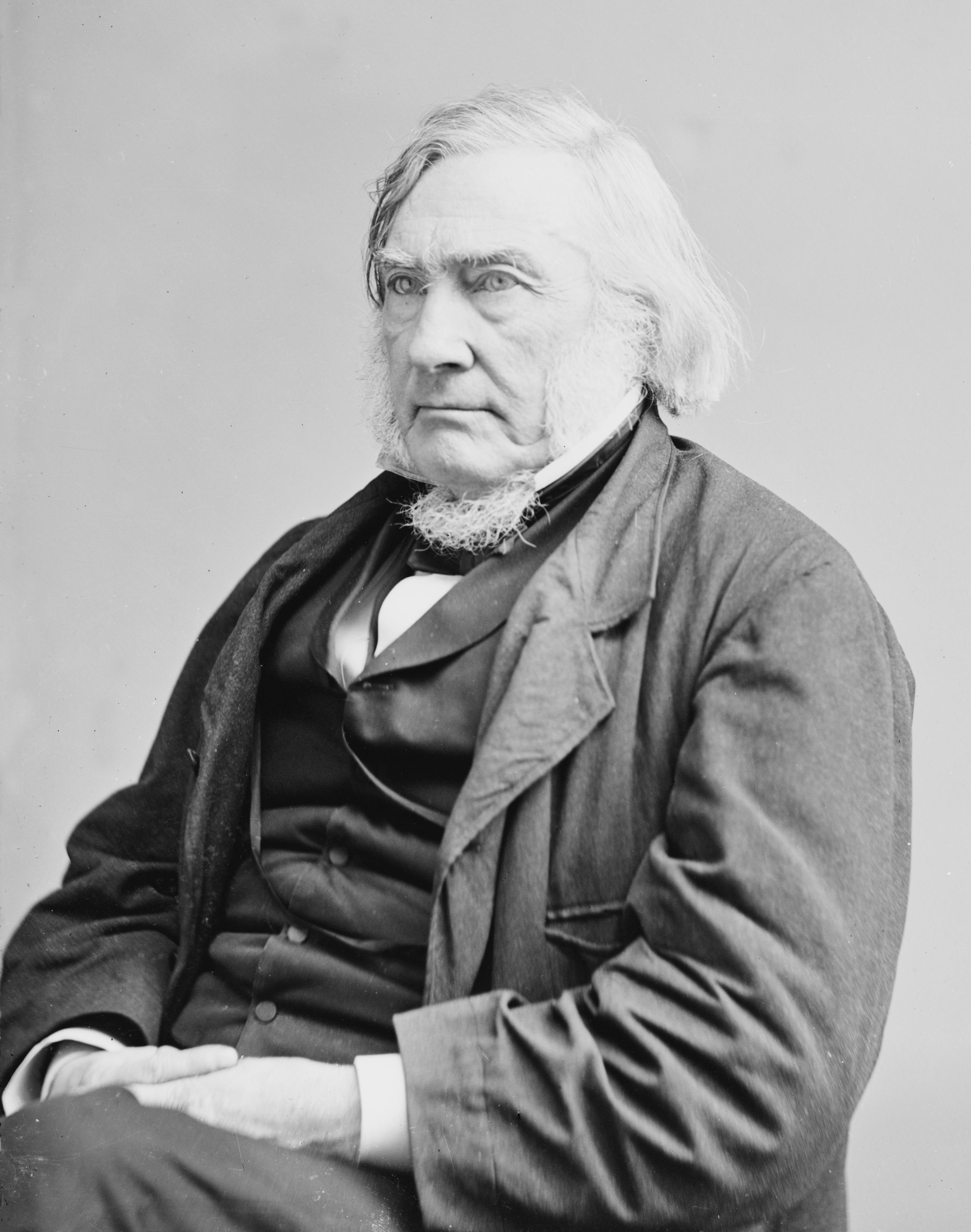
- Nelson c. 1855–1865

Associate Justice of the Supreme Court of the United States
- In office February 27, 1845 – November 28, 1872
- Nominated by: John Tyler
- Preceded by: Smith Thompson
- Succeeded by: Ward Hunt

Personal details
- Born: November 10, 1792 Hebron, New York, U.S.
- Died: December 13, 1873 (aged 81) Cooperstown, New York, U.S.
- Party: Democratic
- Spouses: Pamela Woods (m. 1819; died 1825) Catherine Russell (m. 1825)
- Children: 8, including Rensselaer
- Education: Middlebury College (A.B.)
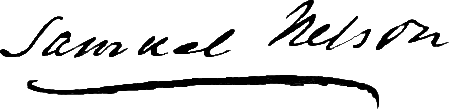
- Signature

Samuel Nelson (November 10, 1792 – December 13, 1873) was an American attorney and appointed as judge of New York State courts. He was appointed as a Justice of the Supreme Court of the United States, serving from 1845 to 1872. He concurred on the 1857 Dred Scott decision, although for reasons different from Chief Justice Taney's.

== Early life ==
Nelson was born in Hebron, New York, on November 10, 1792, the son of Scotch-Irish immigrants John Rodgers Nelson and his wife Jean McArthur. Nelson's family was upper middle class, with a prosperous family farm. Nelson was educated in the public schools of Hebron, with an additional three years in private schooling for college preparation. He entered Middlebury College in Vermont.

His initial intention was to pursue a career as a minister. Upon graduation in 1813, Nelson decided on a legal career. He read law as an apprentice at the firm of John Savage and David Woods in Salem, New York. Two years later, Savage and Woods dissolved their practice. Nelson moved to Madison County to enter into partnership with Woods. Nelson received his license to practice law in 1817, and entered private practice in Cortland. He developed a very successful practice, specializing in real estate and commercial law.

== Career ==
Nelson was a presidential elector in 1820, voting for James Monroe and Daniel D. Tompkins. Nelson served as US Postmaster of Cortland from 1820 to 1823.

In 1821, Nelson served as a delegate to the New York Constitutional Convention, as one of the "Bucktails" faction led by Martin van Buren. Nelson argued for expansion of suffrage and for restructuring the state judiciary. The revised constitution was adopted, and the state created eight new Circuit Courts.

=== New York State judge ===
In 1823, Governor Joseph Yates appointed Nelson as a justice of the new Sixth Circuit Court of Appeals, beginning Nelson's judicial career. He became noted for his work in admiralty and maritime law, and his decisions were rarely appealed.

After eight years as a circuit court judge, Nelson was appointed in 1831 to the New York Supreme Court (then called the New York Supreme Court of Judicature) by Governor Enos Throop. In 1837, Governor William Marcy promoted him to the position of chief justice, succeeding John Savage.

As a justice of the New York Supreme Court, Nelson made his most notable decisions about commercial issues. But his ruling in the case of Jack v. Martin (1834), which touched New York state law in relation to the federal Fugitive Slave Act of 1793 and the Fugitive Slave Clause of the Constitution, may have foreshadowed his concurring opinion in Dred Scott. Nelson said that only the federal government had the right to legislate on the issue of fugitive slaves.

In 1845, Nelson was an unsuccessful candidate for U.S. Senator in a special New York State Legislature election to fill the seat of Silas Wright. At that time the New York state Democrats were split between factions known as Barnburners and Hunkers, and Nelson was identified with the Hunkers. His Barnburner opponent, John Adams Dix, won the party's nomination and the Senate seat.

=== Supreme Court ===
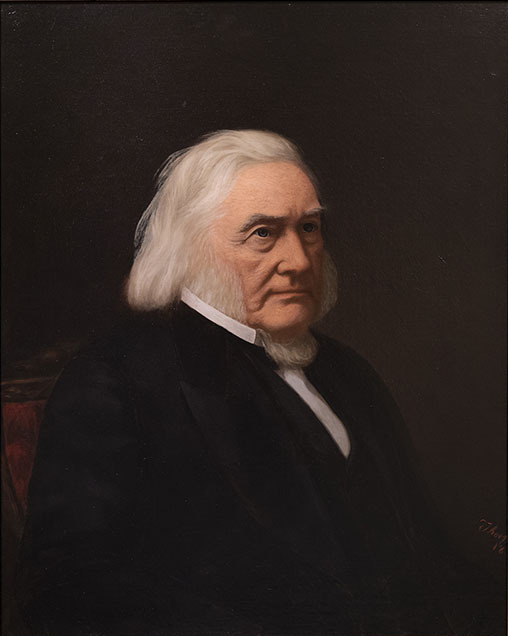
Portrait of Nelson

On February 4, 1845, Nelson was nominated by President John Tyler as an associate justice of the Supreme Court of the United States, to fill the vacant seat of Smith Thompson. The unpopular Tyler had failed repeatedly to fill the Thompson vacancy, with the Whig-controlled Senate rejecting his earlier nominations of John C. Spencer, Reuben Walworth, Edward King, and John M. Read.

Tyler's nomination of Nelson was a surprise, but proved to be a popular choice. Nelson was a highly respected chief justice on the New York Supreme Court, and had a reputation of staying out of partisan conflict. The Whigs found Nelson acceptable because, although he was a Democrat, he had a reputation as a careful and uncontroversial jurist. The Senate confirmed Nelson's appointment on February 14, 1845, after just ten days. Samuel Nelson was the only Supreme Court Justice to be appointed by President Tyler.

A diligent but politically neutral member of the Supreme Court, Nelson became an authority on international, admiralty, maritime, and patent law and often addressed himself primarily to the technical aspects of the cases before the court.

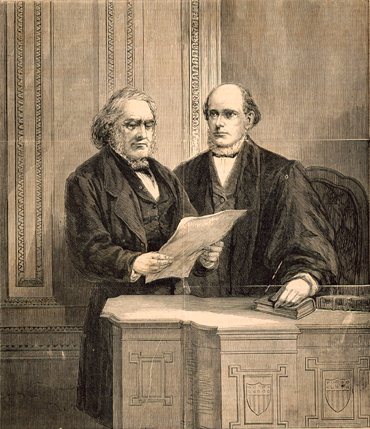
Nelson (left) administers oath to Chief Justice Salmon P. Chase for the impeachment trial of Andrew Johnson

As associate justice, Nelson administered the oath to Chief Justice Salmon P. Chase took for presiding over the impeachment trial of Andrew Johnson.

Nelson served as a Justice for 27 years, until his retirement on November 28, 1872. Justice Nelson was a constitutionally conservative Democrat. He could also be described as a judicial minimalist, meaning he frequently took a moderate stance in cases offering a small, case-specific interpretation of the law, and placed a strong emphasis on precedent. While Nelson was a strong supporter of the Union, he often criticized President Lincoln's policies and did not believe that the Union could be saved in any worthwhile state through the use of force. While Justice Nelson remained relatively non-partisan, he did side frequently with Chief Justice Roger B. Taney and Justice John Archibald Campbell. Nelson also rather frequently disagreed with Justice Benjamin Robbins Curtis. Justice Nelson remained good friends with Chief Justice Taney throughout his lifetime.

==== Pennsylvania v. Wheeling ====
One of Justice Nelson's most important opinions was in the case of Pennsylvania v. Wheeling and Belmont Bridge Company in 1855. The Commonwealth of Pennsylvania sued the builders of a suspension bridge over the Ohio River at Wheeling, Virginia (now West Virginia), chartered by Virginia. It said that the bridge obstructed the passage of steamboats, interfering with interstate commerce, and was therefore a public nuisance.

The suit was litigated for six years and came before the Supreme Court three different times before Justice Nelson's opinion ended it. The Court found that the bridge did qualify as a public nuisance. Congress enacted a law authorizing the bridge at its current height. In its final ruling, written by Nelson, the Court deferred to the legislative branch, overruling its previous decision. It declared that the bridge was not an obstruction to interstate commerce. Nelson drew this conclusion stating, "So far, therefore, as this bridge created an obstruction to the free navigation of the river, in view of the previous acts of Congress, they are to be regarded as modified by this subsequent legislation; and, although it still may be an obstruction in fact, is not so in the contemplation of law."

==== Hotchkiss v. Greenwood ====
Nelson was also the author of the well-known Hotchkiss v. Greenwood opinion in patent law. This opinion established the principle that obvious inventions should not be patentable, which has been a core doctrine of U.S. and international patent law ever since.

== Slavery and states rights ==
Justice Nelson was one of the most prolific opinion writers of the Taney era, but few of his opinions and decisions concerned the most important constitutional questions of the day: slavery and states rights.

In 1834 Mary Martin claimed that Jack "Martin", a black man in New York, was her slave in Louisiana. She filed suit for his return to Louisiana. Jack resisted, claiming that as both he and Mary Martin were currently residents of New York, he was free by New York law, which had abolished slavery. New York had separately passed a law related to procedure for the recovery of fugitive slaves. The Recorder of New York City had issued a certificate to recover Jack Martin, but also issued a writ of habeas corpus by his petition. The circuit court ruled for Ms. Martin, but the case was appealed to the New York Supreme Court. That court's ruling, written by Nelson, found that the power to legislate on the subject of the fugitive slave clause resided exclusively with Congress, and that the New York law was void. This position was upheld by the U.S. Supreme Court in Prigg v. Pennsylvania (1842).

=== Dred Scott ===
In Dred Scott, Nelson was originally assigned to write the majority opinion. That opinion upheld the decision of the Missouri state court against Scott (in Scott v. Emerson), but on the narrow grounds of whether Scott was freed by his temporary residence in a free state. Nelson, avoiding controversy and partisanship as usual, did not address any of the other questions raised in the case, such as black citizenship and the constitutionality of the Missouri Compromise.

While Justice Nelson was preparing this opinion, Justices McLean and Curtis decided to write vehement dissenting opinions. Learning this, Chief Justice Taney, supported by the other southern Justices, decided to write a majority opinion asserting the southern view on those issues: that blacks could not be citizens and the Compromise's restrictions on slavery were unconstitutional.

Despite this switch within the Court, Justice Nelson's views did not change. On March 6, 1857, the Court ruled 7–2 that Dred Scott and his family remained slaves. Justice Nelson concurred in the decision. He issued a separate concurring opinion explaining his different reasoning. He wrote that the question of slavery is one that each state is responsible in deciding for itself, "either by its Legislature or courts of justice, and hence, in respect to the case before us, to the State of Missouri – a question exclusively of Missouri law, and which, when determined by that State, it is the duty of the Federal courts to follow it. In other words, except in cases where the power is restrained by the Constitution of the United States, the law of the State is supreme over the subject of slavery within its jurisdiction." Therefore, the Federal courts had no jurisdiction, and the appeal should be dismissed with no further discussion. While his reasoning was different from Taney's, he upheld the ruling that Dred Scott was still enslaved. Nelson was a northern Democrat and a Unionist, and was said to be inclined to anti-slavery views.

Before the Civil War, Nelson worked to reach a compromise to prevent a war. In the winter of 1861 Justice Nelson joined Justice John Campbell as intermediaries between southern secessionists and President-elect Lincoln. Even after the fighting started, he tried to find a compromise. Nelson was distressed at this failure. Although staunchly opposed to war and critical of many of Lincoln's policies, he remained loyal to the Union.

=== Prize Cases ===
One of Justice Nelson's more noted opinions was his dissent issued in the Prize Cases. President Lincoln had declared a blockade of ports in states that had declared secession, to be enforced by the Navy. Navy ships captured blockade runners, which were seized as prizes under admiralty law. The owners sued for return of their ships, claiming that the blockade was illegal because the President did not have the constitutional authority to declare it.

In 1863, the Court, by vote of 5 to 4, found that the blockade was constitutional. Justice Nelson wrote the dissenting opinion, joined by Chief Justice Taney and Justices Catron and Clifford. He asserted that blockading ports and confiscating enemy property were war powers, and under international law could be exercised only after a formal declaration of war. Nelson wrote that "war cannot lawfully be commenced on the part of the United States without an act of Congress, such act is, of course, a formal notice to all the world, and equivalent to the most solemn declaration." Therefore, the blockade of southern ports by President Lincoln was unconstitutional. Nelson was widely criticized for this opinion.

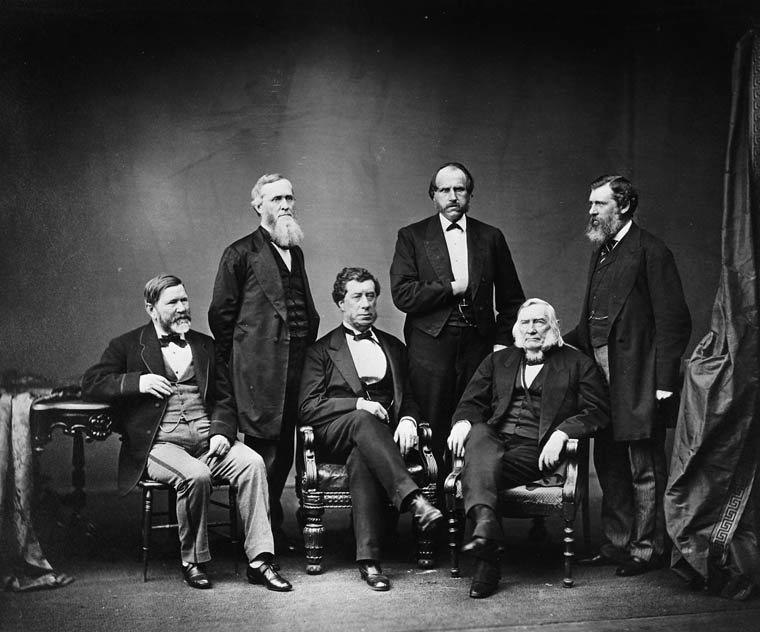
Nelson (bottom row, far right) in 1871.

After the war Nelson urged the administration to reduce the penalties on the defeated South. Nelson's loyalty to the Union was questioned because of his positions.

=== Later career ===
In 1871, President Ulysses S. Grant appointed Nelson to serve on the joint high commission to arbitrate the Alabama Claims. During this time he took a leave of absence from the bench. Soon thereafter, Nelson became ill. He resigned from the commission in 1872, shortly before his death. He was the last federal judge in active service appointed by President Tyler.

== Personal life ==
In 1819 Nelson married Pamela Woods, the daughter of David Woods and his wife. They had two children before her death.

In 1825, the widower married again, to Catharine Ann Russell, a daughter of U.S. Representative John Russell. He brought his two children to the marriage and had six children with Catharine. His fourth child with Catharine, son Rensselaer Russell Nelson, became an attorney. He was appointed as the first United States District Court Judge for the District of Minnesota.

Samuel Nelson died in Cooperstown, New York, on December 13, 1873. He was buried at Cooperstown's Lakewood Cemetery.

== Legacy and honors ==
Nelson received the honorary degree of LL.D. from Geneva College in 1837 and Middlebury College in 1841. He received honorary LL.D. degrees from Columbia University and Hamilton College in 1870.

His law office was preserved as part of the Farmers' Museum in Cooperstown.

== See also ==
- List of justices of the Supreme Court of the United States
- List of United States federal judges by longevity of service

Legal offices
Preceded by Smith Thompson	Associate Justice of the Supreme Court of the United States; 1845–1872	Succeeded by Ward Hunt
