= Title 35 of the United States Code =

U.S. federal statutes on patents

Title 35 of the United States Code is a title of United States Code regarding patent law. The sections of Title 35 govern all aspects of patent law in the United States. There are currently 37 chapters, which include 376 sections (149 of which are used), in Title 35.

Federally recognized forms of intellectual property are scattered throughout the United States Code. Copyrights are covered under Title 17. Trademark and unfair competition law is defined in Chapter 22 of Title 15. Trade Secrets law, another form of intellectual property, is defined in Title 18.

Title 35 has four parts, which are delved into further later in the article:

- Part I—United States Patent and Trademark Office
- Part II—Patentability of Inventions and Grant of Patents
- Part III—Patents and Protection of Patent Rights
- Part IV—Patent Cooperation Treaty

== United States Patent and Trademark Office ==
Sections 1 through 42 establish the United States Patent and Trademark Office (USPTO). The USPTO is responsible for granting and issuing patents and registering trademarks.

== Patentability ==
An invention must meet several requirements to be eligible for a patent. The invention must concern patentable subject matter. The invention must be novel and the application for a patent on the invention must be timely. The invention must be non-obvious. Finally, the invention must be sufficiently documented.

=== Section 101 - Inventions patentable ===
Whoever invents or discovers any new and useful process, machine, manufacture, or composition of matter, or any new and useful improvement thereof, may obtain a patent therefor, subject to the conditions and requirements of this title.

This may seem expansive, but there are limits to section 101 as outlined in the Manual of Patent Examining Procedure. Inventions/discoveries can only be patented once, that is double patenting is prohibited. Only the inventor may be listed as the applicant for a patent. The invention must have a use or utility that "is specific, substantial and credible". There are also limitations on the subject matter that can be patented, it must fall in the four categories of section 101: process, machine, manufacture, or composition of matter, and secondly that it "must qualify as patent-eligible subject matter". The idea of "patent-eligible subject matter" is to prevent abstract ideas, scientific laws, and natural phenomena i.e. chemical compounds, from being patented. The scope of patentable inventions was limited further by the Atomic Energy Act, and so "No patent shall hereafter be granted for any invention or discovery which is useful solely in the utilization of special nuclear material or atomic energy in an atomic weapon."

=== Section 102 - Conditions for Patentability ===
Section 102 describes some of the conditions when a patent should not be granted to an inventor based on the concept of novelty. These conditions generally relate to when an invention is already known publicly. Each subsection of section 102 describes a different kind of prior art which can be used as evidence that an invention is already public. This includes inventions that have already been described in other patent applications or publications. It also includes inventions that have been on sale for more than a year before a patent application was filed. Netscape Commc'ns Corp. v. Konrad is an example of a case that focuses on the public use and on-sale criteria of this section.

This section of US code was affected by the America Invents Act (AIA). The most important part of section 102 now reads as follows:

(a) NOVELTY; PRIOR ART.—A person shall be entitled to a patent unless—

(1) the claimed invention was patented, described in a printed publication, or in public use, on sale, or otherwise available to the public before the effective filing date of the claimed invention; or

(2) the claimed invention was described in a patent issued under section 151, or in an application for patent published or deemed published under section 122(b), in which the patent or application, as the case may be, names another inventor and was effectively filed before the effective filing date of the claimed invention.

Prior to the AIA Section 102 read as follows:

A person shall be entitled to a patent unless -

(a) the invention was known or used by others in this country, or patented or described in a printed publication in this or a foreign country, before the invention thereof by the applicant for patent, or

(b) the invention was patented or described in a printed publication in this or a foreign country or in public use or on sale in this country, more than one year prior to the date of the application for patent in the United States, or

(c) he has abandoned the invention, or

(d) the invention was first patented or caused to be patented, or was the subject of an inventor's certificate, by the applicant or his legal representatives or assigns in a foreign country prior to the date of the application for patent in this country on an application for patent or inventor's certificate filed more than twelve months before the filing of the application in the United States, or

(e) the invention was described in - (1) an application for patent, published under section 122(b), by another filed in the United States before the invention by the applicant for patent or (2) a patent granted on an application for patent by another filed in the United States before the invention by the applicant for patent, except that an international application filed under the treaty defined in section 351(a) shall have the effects for the purposes of this subsection of an application filed in the United States only if the international application designated the United States and was published under Article 21(2) of such treaty in the English language; or

(f) he did not himself invent the subject matter sought to be patented, or

(g)(1) during the course of an interference conducted under section 135 or section 291, another inventor involved therein establishes, to the extent permitted in section 104, that before such person's invention thereof the invention was made by such other inventor and not abandoned, suppressed, or concealed, or (2) before such person's invention thereof, the invention was made in this country by another inventor who had not abandoned, suppressed, or concealed it. In determining priority of invention under this subsection, there shall be considered not only the respective dates of conception and reduction to practice of the invention, but also the reasonable diligence of one who was first to conceive and last to reduce to practice, from a time prior to conception by the other.

Sections 102(a), (b) and (e) are the most important considerations when determining patentable subject matter during patent prosecution.

=== Section 103 ===
35 U.S.C. § 103 describes the condition of patentability referred to as non-obviousness. This provides that a patentable invention must not have been obvious to a "person having ordinary skill in the art" (PHOSITA) in view of the appropriate prior art. The most important judicial decision in interpreting 35 USC 103 is Graham v. John Deere Co. And more recently KSR v. Teleflex in which the Supreme Court of the United States reaffirmed Graham v. Deere and moved away from reliance on the TSM test.

Section 103, post-AIA, reads as follows:

A patent for a claimed invention may not be obtained, notwithstanding that the claimed invention is not identically disclosed as set forth in section 102, if the differences between the claimed invention and the prior art are such that the claimed invention as a whole would have been obvious before the effective filing date of the claimed invention to a person having ordinary skill in the art to which the claimed invention pertains. Patentability shall not be negated by the manner in which the invention was made.

The most important section of pre-AIA section 103 is 103(a):

35 U.S.C. 103 Conditions for patentability; non-obvious subject matter.

(a) A patent may not be obtained though the invention is not identically disclosed or described as set forth in section 102 of this title, if the differences between the subject matter sought to be patented and the prior art are such that the subject matter as a whole would have been obvious at the time the invention was made to a person having ordinary skill in the art to which said subject matter pertains. Patentability shall not be negatived by the manner in which the invention was made.

The full text of this section of the statute can be found at the USPTO.

=== Section 112 ===
35 U.S.C. § 112 dictates the form and content of the specification and the form and content of the patent application's claims. The first paragraph introduces 3 legal concepts, the written description requirement, the enablement requirement, and the best mode requirement. The second paragraph limits the ability of claims to be too open-ended or unclear.

Post-AIA section 112 reads as follows:

35 U.S.C. 112 Specification.

(a) IN GENERAL.—The specification shall contain a written description of the invention, and of the manner and process of making and using it, in such full, clear, concise, and exact terms as to enable any person skilled in the art to which it pertains, or with which it is most nearly connected, to make and use the same, and shall set forth the best mode contemplated by the inventor or joint inventor of carrying out the invention.
(b) CONCLUSION.—The specification shall conclude with one or more claims particularly pointing out and distinctly claiming the subject matter which the inventor or a joint inventor regards as the invention.
(c) FORM.—A claim may be written in independent or, if the nature of the case admits, in dependent or multiple dependent form.
(d) REFERENCE IN DEPENDENT FORMS.—Subject to subsection (e), a claim in dependent form shall contain a reference to a claim previously set forth and then specify a further limitation of the subject matter claimed. A claim in dependent form shall be construed to incorporate by reference all the limitations of the claim to which it refers.
(e) REFERENCE IN MULTIPLE DEPENDENT FORM.—A claim in multiple dependent form shall contain a reference, in the alternative only, to more than one claim previously set forth and then specify a further limitation of the subject matter claimed. A multiple dependent claim shall not serve as a basis for any other multiple dependent claim. A multiple dependent claim shall be construed to incorporate by reference all the limitations of the particular claim in relation to which it is being considered.
(f) ELEMENT IN CLAIM FOR A COMBINATION.—An element in a claim for a combination may be expressed as a means or step for performing a specified function without the recital of structure, material, or acts in support thereof, and such claim shall be construed to cover the corresponding structure, material, or acts described in the specification and equivalents thereof.

The pre-AIA version of section 112 is not substantially different from this.

== Outline of title 35 ==
Title 35

=== Part I — United States Patent and Trademark Office ===
Part I

- Chapter 1 — Establishment, officers and employees, functions
- Chapter 2 — Proceedings in the Patent and Trademark Office
- Chapter 3 — Practice before Patent and Trademark Office
- Chapter 4 — Patent fees; funding; search systems

=== Part II — Patentability of Inventions and Grant of Patents ===
Part II

- Chapter 10 — Patentability of inventions
- Chapter 11 — Application for patent
- Chapter 12 — Examination of application
- Chapter 13 — Review of Patent and Trademark Office decisions
- Chapter 14 — Issue of patent
- Chapter 15 — Plant patents
- Chapter 16 — Designs
- Chapter 17 — Secrecy of certain inventions and filing applications in foreign country
- Chapter 18 — Patent rights in inventions made with federal assistance

=== Part III — Patents and Protection of Patent Rights ===
Part III

- Chapter 25 — Amendment and correction of patents
- Chapter 26 — Ownership and assignment
- Chapter 27 — Government interests in patents
- Chapter 28 — Infringement of patents
- Chapter 29 — Remedies for infringement of patent, and other actions
- Chapter 30 — Prior art citations to office and ex parte reexamination of patents
- Chapter 31 — Inter partes review
- Chapter 32 — Post-grant review

=== Part IV — Patent Cooperation Treaty ===
Part IV

- Chapter 35 — Definitions
- Chapter 36 — International stage
- Chapter 37 — National stage

=== Part V — The Hague Agreement Concerning International Registration of Industrial Designs ===
Part V

- Chapter 38 — International design applications
