= Cripps question =

British patent law question

In patent law, the Cripps question is:

"Was it for all practical purpose obvious to any skilled chemist in the state of chemical knowledge existing at the date of the patent which consists of the chemical literature available (a selection of which appears in the Particulars of Objections) and his general chemical knowledge, that he could manufacture valuable therapeutic agents by making the higher alkyl resorcinols; ... ?"

It was posed in the 1920s by Stafford Cripps in a British patent case about n-hexyl resorcinol, Sharp & Dohme Inc v Boots Pure Drug Company Ltd and approved by the Master of the Rolls Lord Hanworth in the Court of Appeal's judgment. If the answer was yes the patent was invalid for lack of inventive step or obviousness (or, in the terminology used at the time, want of subject matter). Referred to later as the Cripps question, this way of formulating the issue of inventive step in English law was deployed for many years thereafter. The Cripps question was noted by Lord Reid in the House of Lords in Technograph Printed Circuits v Mills & Rockley, a case about a printed circuit board.
