= KSR International Co. v. Teleflex Inc. =

KSR v. Teleflex
- Supreme Court of the United States

Argued November 28, 2006 Decided April 30, 2007
- Full case name: KSR International Co. v. Teleflex Inc., et al.
- Docket no.: 04-1350
- Citations: 550 U.S. 398 (more) 127 S. Ct. 1727; 167 L. Ed. 2d 705; 2007 U.S. LEXIS 4745; 82 U.S.P.Q.2d (BNA) 1385

Case history
- Prior: Summary judgment granted for Defendant, 298 F. Supp. 2d 581 (E.D. Mich. 2003); rev'd, 119 F. App'x 282 (Fed. Cir. 2005); cert. granted, 547 U.S. 902 (2006).
- Subsequent: Affirming district court judgment, 228 F. App'x 988 (Fed. Cir. Jun. 20, 2007) (unpublished opinion)

Holding
- The Federal Circuit erred in rigidly applying the narrow teaching/suggestion/motivation standard for obviousness under 35 U.S.C. §103, for precluding application of "obvious to try" considerations, and for too rigidly constricting the use of hindsight, in conflict with the broader obviousness evaluation established in Graham.

Court membership
- Chief Justice John Roberts Associate Justices John P. Stevens · Antonin Scalia; Anthony Kennedy · David Souter; Clarence Thomas · Ruth Bader Ginsburg; Stephen Breyer · Samuel Alito

Case opinion
- Majority: Kennedy, joined by unanimous

Laws applied
- 35 U.S.C. § 103

KSR Int'l Co. v. Teleflex Inc., 550 U.S. 398 (2007), is a decision by the Supreme Court of the United States concerning the issue of obviousness as applied to patent claims.

== Case history ==
Teleflex sued KSR International, claiming that one of KSR's products infringed Teleflex's patent on connecting an adjustable vehicle control pedal to an electronic throttle control. KSR argued that the combination of the two elements was obvious, and the claim was therefore not patentable. The district court ruled in favor of KSR, but the Court of Appeals for the Federal Circuit reversed in January 2005.

Oral arguments were heard by the Supreme Court on November 28, 2006. The petitioner, KSR, was represented by James W. Dabney and patent law academic John F. Duffy. Deputy solicitor general Thomas G. Hungar represented the government, which sided with the petitioner. Thomas C. Goldstein argued on behalf of the respondent, Teleflex.

== Decision ==
On April 30, 2007, the Supreme Court unanimously reversed the judgment of the Federal Circuit, holding that the disputed claim 4 of the patent was obvious under the requirements of 35 U.S.C. §103, and that in "rejecting the District Court’s rulings, the Court of Appeals analyzed the issue in a narrow, rigid manner inconsistent with §103 and our precedents," referring to the Federal Circuit's application of the "teaching-suggestion-motivation" (TSM) test.

=== The "person having ordinary skill in the art" standard ===
Justice Kennedy emphasized that, while his opinion was directed at correcting the "errors of law made by the Court of Appeals in this case," it was necessary to reverse the Federal Circuit's decision in light of the Federal Circuit's misapplication of controlling Supreme Court law: "As our precedents make clear, however, the analysis need not seek out precise teachings directed to the specific subject matter of the challenged claim, for a court can take account of the inferences and creative steps that a person of ordinary skill in the art would employ." Kennedy's opinion stated, "A person of ordinary skill is also a person of ordinary creativity, not an automaton." He acknowledged that his description of a person having ordinary skill in the art (PHOSITA) does not necessarily conflict with Federal Circuit cases that described a PHOSITA as having "common sense" and who could find motivation "implicitly in the prior art."

=== Obviousness ===
When generally describing the obviousness test, the Court was largely uncontroversial:

In determining whether the subject matter of a patent claim is obvious, neither the particular motivation nor the avowed purpose of the patentee controls. What matters is the objective reach of the claim. If the claim extends to what is obvious, it is invalid under §103. One of the ways in which a patent's subject matter can be proved obvious is by noting that there existed at the time of invention a known problem for which there was an obvious solution encompassed by the patent's claims.

However, when the standard was applied to the facts before the Court, the Court stated:

The proper question to have asked was whether a pedal designer of ordinary skill, facing the wide range of needs created by developments in the field of endeavor, would have seen a benefit to upgrading [a prior art patent] with a sensor.

The court proposed several criteria that can be used to reject a patent claim for obviousness:

- Combining prior art elements according to known methods to yield predictable results
- Simple substitution of one known element for another to obtain predictable results
- Use of known technique to improve similar devices (methods, or products) in the same way
- "Obvious to try" – choosing from a finite number of identified, predictable solutions, with a reasonable expectation of success
- Known work in one field of endeavor may prompt variations of it for use in either the same field or a different one based on design incentives or other market forces if the variations are predictable to one of ordinary skill in the art.

== Implications ==
A great deal of debate sprang up in the wake of the decision, particularly over the implications on the TSM test and concepts including "obvious to try", "person having ordinary skill in the art" and summary judgment. While not explicitly denouncing the TSM test, there is some harsh language in regard to it and the Federal Circuit's application of the test. The opinion stated that the application of the bar on patents claiming obvious subject matter "must not be confined within a test or formulation too constrained to serve its purpose." The opinion does denounce procedures that bar the use of "common sense" in multiple instances, including where "[r]igid preventative rules that deny factfinders recourse to common sense, however, are neither necessary under our case law nor consistent with it." Chief Judge Paul Michel of the Federal Circuit was quoted saying that by his interpretation, the TSM test remains part of the calculation of obviousness, "but it gives us forceful instruction on the manner in which the test is to be applied."

The KSR decision has been criticized as substituting the statutory requirement of non-obviousness for an easier-to-prove evidence of unpredictability.

A statistical study noted that there was a multi-fold increase in the percentage of patents found invalid on trials both on the basis of novelty and of non-obviousness before and after the certiorari in KSR. These percentages declined to almost pre-KSR levels in the two years following KSR.

In Leapfrog Enterprises, Inc. v. Fisher-Price, Inc., the Federal Circuit began applying the KSR case, holding U.S. Patent 5,813,861 invalid as obvious. A KSR-style obviousness analysis was applied in Perfect Web Technologies, Inc. v. InfoUSA, Inc..

The USPTO Board of Patent Appeals and Interferences (BPAI) cites KSR in about 60% of its decisions related to obviousness irrespective of whether it affirms a patent examiner's rejection or reverses the rejection. Overall reversal rates have stayed about the same, indicating that KSR has not suddenly made all inventions obvious. The BPAI is emphasizing that examiners must still give strong reasons for their rejections. The USPTO management has backed this emphasis up with a memorandum to all technology directors instructing them that when making an obviousness rejection "it remains necessary to identify the reason why a person of ordinary skill in the art would have combined the prior art elements in the manner claimed."

In the article The KSR Standard for Obviousness: A Pendulum Shift to 20/20 Hindsight, attorneys Michael O. Warnecke, Esq., and Brandy R. McMillion, Esq. discuss how the 2007 Supreme Court decision creates the need for full knowledge and complete understanding about the obviousness of a new technology before the 2007 ruling (20/20 Hindsight).

== See also ==
- Works related to KSR International Co. v. Teleflex Inc. at Wikisource
- Graham v. John Deere Co. (1966)
