= Non-obviousness in United States patent law =

One of the patentability requirement under US law

In US patent law, non-obviousness is one of the requirements that an invention must meet to qualify for patentability, codified as a part of Patent Act of 1952 as 35 U.S.C. §103. An invention is not obvious if a "person having ordinary skill in the art" (PHOSITA) would not know how to solve the problem at which the invention is directed by using exactly the same mechanism. Since the PHOSITA standard turned to be too ambiguous in practice, the U.S. Supreme Court provided later two more useful approaches which currently control the practical analysis of non-obviousness by patent examiners and courts: Graham et al. v. John Deere Co. of Kansas City et al., 383 U.S. 1 (1966) gives guidelines of what is "non-obvious", and KSR v. Teleflex (2006) gives guidelines of what is "obvious".

In the post-KSR (2006) patent legal practice in the US, the requirement for non-obviousness is often conflated with non-predictability. It is easier to find non-obviousness in non-predictable arts (such as pharmacology), and more difficult in predictable arts (such as business methods). Another contentious area is contradictions between non-obviousness and patentable subject matter requirements: whereas non-obviousness can be easily met, when inventor discovers something new and unexpected (like the discovery of the DNA segments corresponding to the fetus's father in the blood of pregnant women in Ariosa v. Sequenom), a patent will be denied, as not meeting statutory subject matter requirement, "if the APPLICATION [of this discovery] merely relies upon elements already known in the art." (see also Mayo Collaborative Services v. Prometheus Laboratories, Inc. and Association for Molecular Pathology v. Myriad Genetics, Inc.) The alleged rationale for this dichotomy is to prevent broad patent claims that would inhibit rather than "promote the Progress of Science", as required by the Copyright Clause of the US Constitution.

== Historical development ==
Constitutionally, the non-obviousness requirement is established by Article 1, Section 8, Clause 8: "The Congress shall have the power ... to promote the Progress of Science .., by securing for limited Times to ... Inventors the exclusive Right to their ... Discoveries". The phrase to promote the Progress of Science defines the purpose of the patent system, which is to encourage private investments into fundamental science research rather than to grant monopoly on something that is taken from a public domain (or on something that limits the opportunities for doing research, e.g. research tools are not patentable). The Progress of Science requirement constitutionally validates the pragmatic approach to non-obviousness described below. The word Discoveries establishes the level to which the contribution to the Progress of Science must rise to deserve the temporary monopoly.

=== 1790-1850: the early days ===
The first patent statute enacted by the Congress in 1790 required patentable inventions or discoveries to be "sufficiently useful and important". One can interpret important as important for the Progress of Science since the importance for economy is stated by useful. The next Patent Act of 1793 did not have the important language, but stated that "simply changing the form or the proportions of any machine, or compositions of matter, in any degree, shall not be deemed a discovery." (This statement was actually adopted from the French Patent Law of 1791). This was echoed in Thomas Jefferson's 1814 letter explaining that changing material, for example, from cast iron to wrought iron was insufficient for patentability.

The difficulty of formulating conditions for patentability was heightened by the generality of the constitutional grant and the statutes implementing it, together with the underlying policy of the patent system that "the things which are worth to the public the embarrassment of an exclusive patent", as Jefferson put it, must outweigh the restrictive effect of the limited patent monopoly. The 1836 Patent Act did not have the "simply changing" language but stated instead that the Commissioner of Patents was authorized to issue a patent for any "sufficiently used and important" invention or discovery.

The U.S. Supreme Court considered the issue of inventiveness/non-obviousness/discovery for the first time in 1822 in Evans v. Eaton (20 US 356,431) when it approved the interpretation of a lower court that a patentable improvement must involve a change in the "principle of the machine" not "a mere change in the form or proportions". Currently, such variations are usually interpreted as a lack of novelty not of an inventive step.

=== 1851–1951: struggles to find practical criteria ===
The issue of non-obviousness reached the U.S. Supreme Court again in 1851 in Hotchkiss v. Greenwood. The question was whether a substitution of known door knob materials such as metal or wood for a new material—porcelain—deserved a patent. The court concluded that "the improvement is the work of a skillful mechanic, not that of the inventor" and invalidated the patent. Such approach foresees the line of thought which was later formulated as the PHOSITA (person having ordinary skill in the art) approach to the analysis of inventiveness. Despite beginning to develop the PHOSITA approach, the Court did not give practical means to determine what how much inventiveness deserves a patent. It is worth noting here that Evans v. Eaton and Hotchkiss v. Greenwood, respectively, illustrate the heretofore existing trend to state the appropriate inventiveness by defining both what is obvious (lacks an inventive step / discovery) and what is non-obvious (has an inventive step / discovery).

During the period from 1851 to 1951, several new cases related to the non-obviousness of claimed subject matter in patents reached the Supreme Court. One noteworthy case is Rubber-Tip Pencil Co. v. Howard 87 U.S. (20 Wall.) 498 (1874), in which the Supreme Court invalidated a patent on a pencil with a rubber eraser cap, on the theory that everyone knows rubber will stick to wood inserted into a hole in the rubber. In another noteworthy case, Sinclair & Carrol Co. v. Interchemical Corp. (1945), the U.S. Supreme Court found that a patent was "not the product of long and difficult experimentation", and that "reading a list and selecting a known compound to meet known requirements is not more ingenious than selecting the last piece to put into the last opening in a jig-saw puzzle".

However, during that time the Courts struggled to find both the required levels of inventiveness and obviousness and practically useful criteria to measure these levels. One notable example of this struggle is the 1941 US Supreme Court case of Cuno Engineering v. Automatic Devices Corp., which was said to establish the flash of genius doctrine as a test of patentability of an invention: "the new device must reveal the flash of creative genius, not merely the skill of the calling".

The Flash of Genius approach was thought to have shifted the analysis of inventiveness from importance and from PHOSITA to the state of mind of the inventor; it caused uproar in the patent law community as courts struggled to find alternative approaches. One notable example of this struggle is the positions of Justice Douglas in Great Atlantic & Pacific Tea Co. v. Supermarket Equipment Corp. in 1950, where he opined that to deserve a patent, an invention "had to serve the end of science—to push back the frontiers of chemistry, physics, and the like"; while two years prior in Funk Bros. Seed Co. v. Kalo Inoculant Co. he stated that the discovery of a new natural principle—is not patentable of itself, "however ingenious the discovery of this natural principle may have been".

Similar problem arose again in Mayo Collaborative Servs. v. Prometheus Labs., Inc. (2012), where the U.S. Supreme Court majority stated: "The conclusion is that (1) a newly discovered law of nature is itself unpatentable and (2) the application of that newly discovered law is also normally unpatentable if the application merely relies upon elements already known in the art." It is worth noting, however, that this opinion remains highly controversial; as Justice Stephen Breyer stated, it risked rendering "all inventions unpatentable because all inventions can be reduced to underlying principles of nature which, once known, make their implementation obvious."

This position raised issues as to a need to establish the boundary of the patentable domain, not only with routine improvements but also with major advancements in science, i.e. creating too much monopoly which may impede rather that promote the Progress of Science. Currently, the latter boundary is established via the requirement for patent-eligible subject matter (research tools, scientific theories and laws are not patent eligible) while the issue of how much inventiveness is required to deserve a patent is supposed to be defined via the non-obviousness requirement.

The trend that started to develop around 1950 (and dominates today) was to require disclosure of an element of discovery, while granting patent monopoly on only one or a few "particular applications of [natural] laws" that the discoverer came up with before the very first disclosure becomes published. The duality between the non-obviousness requirement and an overbroad scope of claims is expected to receive further development by the U.S. Supreme Court in due course.

The U.S. Supreme Court's decision in Great Atlantic & Pacific Tea Co. v. Supermarket Equipment Corp. in 1950 is often considered the high-water mark of the pragmatic approach, as the Court reversed (after affirmations in two lower courts) the patent grant of a commercially successful but very simple mechanical device as merely a "gadget". Based on its decision that a combination "which only unites old elements with no change in their respective functions" is unpatentable because such a patent would "obviously withdraw what already in known into the field of its monopoly and diminish . . . the resources available to skillful men." Another example of insufficient inventiveness of that time can be found in In re Aller (CCPA, 1955) "It is not inventive to discover the optimum or workable ranges by routine experimentation." This restriction was, however, lifted later in cases where "a parameter must be recognized as a result-effective variable before a determination of routine experimentation".

As a practical test for the pragmatic approach for lower courts to use, the Supreme Court proposed "unusual or surprising consequences" from the combination of old elements: "[O]nly when the whole in some way exceeds the sum of its parts is the accumulation of old devices patentable." Although the time validated the pragmatic approach (does the patent promote the progress of science or does it take away from the public domain), the for- criterion of "unusual or surprising consequences" turned out to be too ambiguous and too high in practice. On the other hand, the against-criterion for a combination that "only unites old elements with no change in their respective functions" has been useful in practice ever since.

Another relevant case from this period is Graver Tank & Manufacturing Co. v. Linde Air Products Co. It established the line of thought that what was not claimed by the inventor in an issued patent but is an obvious variation of what was claimed should be considered as covered by the claims via the Doctrine of equivalents.

However, neither the pragmatic approach nor the "unusual or surprising consequence" criterion received further development at that time, because the Congress took in 1952 a different approach to determining non-obviousness going back to a subjective factor similar to the inventor's (called PHOSITA, i.e. Person Having Ordinary Skills In The Art) state-of-mind.

=== 1952–1983: PHOSITA ===
In order to reduce the impact of non-obviousness on patentability, to eliminate the flash of genius test, and to provide a more fair and practical way to determine whether the invention disclosure deserves a patent monopoly, the Congress took the matter in its own hands and enacted the Patent Act of 1952 35 U.S.C. Section § 103 reads:

A patent may not be obtained though the invention is not identically disclosed or described as set forth in section 102 (Novelty requirement) of this title, if the differences between the subject matter sought to be patented and the prior art are such that the subject matter as a whole would have been obvious at the time the invention was made to a person having ordinary skill in the art to which said subject matter pertains. Patentability shall not be negated by the manner in which the invention was made.

The last sentence about the manner was added in order to overrule the flash of genius test.

The Patent Act of 1952 added 35 U.S.C. § 103, which effectively codified non-obviousness as a requirement to show that an idea is suitable for patent protection. The section essentially requires a comparison of the subject matter sought to be patented and the prior art, to determine whether or not the subject matter of the patent as a whole would have been obvious, at the time of the invention, to a Person having ordinary skill in the art a.k.a. PHOSITA. (Similar criteria were enacted and are currently used in many other countries.) Clark held that the Congress, in passing the Act, intended to codify and clarify the common law surrounding the Patent Act by making explicit the requirement of non-obviousness. However, this test turned out be ambiguous and of little help in practice since PHOSITA does not exist.

The most important case law development during this period was the 1966 US Supreme Court decision in Graham v. John Deere Co., which suggested criteria that must be considered in a practical analysis of non-obviousness:

1. the scope and content of the prior art;
2. the differences between the claimed invention in the prior art;
3. a level of ordinary skill;
4. objective indicia of non-obviousness which are known as "Graham's factors", such as: "commercial success, long felt but unresolved needs, failure of others, and unexpected results" are to serve the important purpose of “guard[ing] against slipping into use of hindsight” when making a determination of obviousness;
5. the "inducement standard", suggesting that the nonobviousness doctrine is meant to restrict the award of patents to only "those inventions which would not be disclosed or devised but for the inducement of a patent." Although, the Graham's factors have been cited numerous times by patent examiners and courts and the inducement standard has been largely ignored.

=== 1984–2006: Teaching-suggestion-motivation test ===
At the same time the newly established United States Court of Appeals for the Federal Circuit, which was supposed to establish a uniform case law for patent validity appeals, started to reject the "unusual and surprising approach" altogether and introduced the "teaching, suggestion and motivation" (TSM) test in ACS Hosp. Sys. (1984). The test allowed the rejection of a patent for obviousness only when factual teaching, suggestion or motivation from the prior art show the propriety of the patented combination.

Further, the combination of previously known elements can be considered obvious. As the Federal Circuit asserted in Winner Int'l Royalty Corp. v. Wang, there must be a suggestion or teaching in the prior art to combine elements shown in the prior art in order to find a patent obvious. Thus, in general the critical inquiry, the Federal Circuit maintained, is whether there is something in the prior art to suggest the desirability, and thus the obvious nature, of the combination of previously known elements.

This requirement is generally referred to as the "teaching-suggestion-motivation" (TSM) test and is said to serve to prevent against hindsight bias. As almost all inventions are some combination of known elements, the TSM test requires a patent examiner (or accused infringer) to show that some suggestion or motivation exists to combine known elements to form a claimed invention. Some critics of the TSM test have claimed that the test requires evidence of an explicit teaching or suggestion to make a particular modification to the prior art, but the Federal circuit has made clear that the motivation may be implicit, and may be provided for example by an advantage resulting from the modification. In other words, an explicit prior art teaching or suggestion to make a particular modification is sufficient, but not required for a finding of obviousness.

The TSM test is actually more similar to the requirement for novelty than for non-obviousness. Despite an immediate and overwhelming uproar in the technical and legal communities criticizing TSM as being too low, the Congress did not act to overturn the TSM standard. However, its application was refined by the US Supreme Court in KSR v. Teleflex (2007).

Obvious	Non-obvious
a mere change in the form or proportions (Evans, 1822)	change in the “principle of the machine” (Evans, 1822)
change of a material for a known material without changing function even if a lower cost results (Hotchkiss 1851)	unusual or surprising consequences (Great Atlantic, 1950)
only unites old elements with no change in their respective functions. (Great Atlantic, 1950)	Only when the whole in some way exceeds the sum of its parts is the accumulation of old devices patentable." (Great Atlantic, 1950)
when a patent claims a structure already known in the prior art that is altered by the mere substitution of one element for another known in the field, the combination must do more than yield a predictable result. Adams, 1966	Non-predictable results from a substitution/combination (reversed Adams)
[t]he two [pre-existing elements] in combination did no more than they would in separate, sequential operation. (Anderson's-Black Rock, Inc. v. Pavement Salvage Co., 1969)	Synergism from a combination (reversed Adams).
Prior art suggests a mere possibility of such a solution even if it does not say the exact ranges (TSM)	skepticism or disbelief before the invention (Environmental Designs, 1983). Failure of others (Graham)
The claimed solution is not used in practice and the lawsuit is brought by a patent troll.	copying, praise, unexpected results, and industry acceptance. Allen Archery, 1987. Commercial success (Graham).
Combining prior art elements according to known methods to yield predictable results; KSR, 2007	Non-predictable result(s) even if the combination involves known elements and methods, and better yet if an element or a method is new.
Simple substitution of one known element for another to obtain predictable results. KSR, 2007	Non-predictable result(s) of a substitution.
Use of known technique to improve similar devices (methods, or products) in the same way. KSR, 2007	Use of a technique to improve dissimilar devices (methods, products) even if the technique is known in another field
“Obvious to try” – choosing from a finite number of identified, predictable solutions, with a reasonable expectation of success. KSR, 2007	If the solution is unpredictable and found experimentally, and better yet, if the very existence of a solution (suitable range) is unpredictable.
Known work in one field of endeavor may prompt variations of it for use in either the same field or a different one based on design incentives or other market forces if the variations are predictable to one of ordinary skill in the art. KSR, 2007	Use of a technique, even if known in another field, to improve dissimilar devices (methods, products) if "the actual application is beyond his or her skill" (KSR) =i.e. variations are unpredictable.
When a work is available in one field of endeavor, design incentives and other market forces can prompt variations of it, either in the same field or a different one. If a person of ordinary skill can implement a predictable variation, § 103 likely bars its patentability. Sakraida v. AG Pro, Inc. (1976)	Long felt but unsolved needs (Graham) unless these needs are solved by a newly publicly disclosed method (with a predictable claim range)
if a technique has been used to improve one device, and a PHOSITA would recognize that it would improve similar devices in the same way, using the technique is obvious	unless [the technique's] actual application is beyond [PHOSITA's] skill...(Sakraida)
although "doubtless a matter of great convenience, producing a desired result in a cheaper and faster way, and enjoying commercial success," the claimed system "did not produce a new or different function" and therefore was not patentable.Sakraida v. AG Pro, Inc. (1976)	commercial success (Graham)
there is no change in the respective functions of the elements of the combination; this particular use of the assembly of old elements would be obvious to any person skilled in the art of mechanical application. Sakraida v. AG Pro, Inc. (1976)	commercial success (Graham)
there is no change in the respective functions of the elements of the combination; this particular use of the assembly of old elements would be obvious to any person skilled in the art of mechanical application. Sakraida v. AG Pro, Inc. (1976)	the elapsed time between prior art and the patent's filing date (Leo Pharm. Prods., Ltd. v. Rea, 726 F.3d 1346, 1350 (Fed. Cir. 2013))
Some teaching, suggestion, or motivation in the prior art that would have led one of ordinary skill to modify the prior art reference or to combine prior art reference teachings to arrive at the claimed invention. KSR, 2007	Prior art teaches away from the claimed solution.
commercial success by itself is not sufficient (Sakraida v. AG Pro, Inc. 1976)	commercial success (Graham, 1966)
(near) simultaneous invention by two or more independent inventors	long felt need for a solution to a real problem which has been recognized in the prior art or in the industry.(Graham)

=== 2007 to the present: the post-KSR period ===
As of 2016, the guidelines for establishing a prima facie case obviousness adopted by the USPTO based on the KSR v Teleflex decision are as follows:

1. Combining prior art elements according to known methods to yield predictable results;
2. Simple substitution of one known element for another to obtain predictable results;
3. Use of known technique to improve similar devices (methods, or products) in the same way;
4. Applying a known technique to a known device (method, or product) ready for improvement to yield predictable results;
5. "Obvious to try" – choosing from a finite number of identified, predictable solutions, with a reasonable expectation of success;
6. Known work in one field of endeavor may prompt variations of it for use in either the same field or a different one based on design incentives or other market forces if the variations are predictable to one of ordinary skill in the art;
7. Some teaching, suggestion, or motivation in the prior art that would have led one of ordinary skill to modify the prior art reference or to combine prior art reference teachings to arrive at the claimed invention.

The KSR decision has been criticized because it apparently replaced the requirement of non-obviousness with the requirement of non-predictability, thus making it more difficult to get patents in the predictable arts, and creating a contradiction with some Graham's factors such as "failures of others".

The Graham and KSR guidelines were not affected by the America Invents Act, despite the change in general rule 35 U.S.C. §103 which defines the non-obviousness requirement effective on March 16, 2013:

OLD

A patent may not be obtained though the invention is not identically disclosed or described as set forth in section 102 of this title, if the differences between the subject matter sought to be patented and the prior art are such that the SUBJECT MATTER AS A WHOLE would have been OBVIOUS AT THE TIME THE INVENTION WAS MADE to a person having ordinary skill in the art to which said subject matter pertains.

NEW

A patent for a claimed invention may not be obtained, notwithstanding that the claimed invention is not identically disclosed as set forth in section 102, if the differences between the claimed invention and the prior art are such that the CLAIMED INVENTION AS A WHOLE would have been obvious BEFORE THE EFFECTIVE FILING DATE OF THE CLAIMED INVENTION to a person having ordinary skill in the art to which said subject matter pertains.

Since ca. 2010 (see Bilski v. Kappos, Mayo Collaborative Services v. Prometheus Laboratories, Inc., Ariosa v. Sequenom), the US Supreme Court developed another (absent in the legislative statute) requirement for patentable subject matter, which mandates in addition to an inventive step (such as a discovery of natural phenomenon) another "inventive application" in order to prevent a monopoly on the discovery itself.
