= Graham v. John Deere Co. =

- Supreme Court of the United States

Argued October 14, 1965 Decided February 21, 1966
- Full case name: William T. Graham, et al. v. John Deere Co. of Kansas City, et al., together with No. 37, Calmar, Inc. v. Cook Chemical Co., and No. 43, Colgate-Palmolive Co. v. Cook Chemical Co., also on certiorari to the same court.
- Citations: 383 U.S. 1 (more) 86 S.Ct. 684; 15 L. Ed. 2d 545; 1966 U.S. LEXIS 2908; 148 U.S.P.Q. 459

Case history
- Prior: Graham v. John Deere Co., 216 F. Supp. 272 (W.D. Mo. 1963); reversed, John Deere Co. v. Graham, 333 F.2d 529 (8th Cir. 1964); cert. granted, 379 U.S. 956 (1965).; Calmar, Inc. v. Cook Chemical Co., 220 F. Supp. 414 (W.D. Mo. 1963); affirmed, 336 F.2d 110 (8th Cir. 1964); cert. granted, 379 U.S. 956 (1965).

Holding
- The nonobviousness requirement set forth in 35 U.S.C. § 103 was meant to codify the previous common law requirement that an invention be a significant improvement in the art.

Court membership
- Chief Justice Earl Warren Associate Justices Hugo Black · William O. Douglas; Tom C. Clark · John M. Harlan II; William J. Brennan Jr. · Potter Stewart; Byron White · Abe Fortas

Case opinion
- Majority: Clark, joined by Warren, Black, Douglas, Harlan, Brennan, White
- Stewart and Fortas took no part in the consideration or decision of the case.

Laws applied
- U.S. Const. Art. I, § 8, cl. 8, 35 U.S.C. § 103

Graham v. John Deere Co., 383 U.S. 1 (1966), was a case in which the United States Supreme Court clarified the nonobviousness requirement in United States patent law, set forth 14 years earlier in Patent Act of 1952 and codified as 35 U.S.C. § 103.

Although the Court confirmed that non-obviousness is a question of law, it held that §103 required a determination of the following questions of fact to resolve the issue of obviousness:

1. Scope and content of the prior art
2. Differences between the claimed invention and the prior art
3. Level of ordinary skill in the art

In addition, the Court mentioned "secondary considerations" which could serve as evidence of nonobviousness. These are known as "Graham's factors":

1. Commercial success
2. Long felt but unsolved needs
3. Failure of others
4. Unexpected results

The Court stated, that the purpose of these factors is to "guard against slipping into use of hindsight" when making a determination of obviousness.

The SCOTUS also proposed the inducement standard, suggesting that patent law's nonobviousness doctrine is meant to restrict the award of patents to only "those inventions which would not be disclosed or devised but for the inducement of a patent." Although, the Graham's factors have been cited numerous times by patent examiners and courts, the inducement standard has been largely ignored.

Despite providing these useful guidelines, the Court also recognized that these questions would likely need to be answered on a case-by-case basis, first by the United States Patent and Trademark Office (USPTO), then by the courts. The "non-obviousness criteria" laid out in Graham were complemented in 2007 by "obviousness criteria" in another US Supreme Court case (see KSR v. Teleflex).

== Facts and procedural history ==
The case was actually a set of consolidated appeals of two cases, originating in the same court and dealing with similar issues. The named petitioner, William T. Graham, had sued the John Deere Co. for patent infringement. The invention in question was a combination of old mechanical elements: a device designed to absorb shock from the shanks of chisel plows as they plow through rocky soil and thus to prevent damage to the plow. Graham sought to solve this problem by attaching the plow shanks to spring clamps, to allow them to flex freely underneath the frame of the plow. He applied for a patent on this clamp, and in 1950, obtained U.S. patent 2,493,811 (referred to by the Court as the '811 patent). Shortly thereafter, he made some improvements to the clamp design by placing the hinge plate beneath the plow shank rather than above it, in order to minimize the outward motion of the shank away from the plate. He applied for a patent on this improvement, which was granted in 1953 as U.S. patent 2,627,798 (referred to by the court as the '798 patent). While Graham's patent had been upheld in a previous case before the United States Court of Appeals for the Fifth Circuit, the United States Court of Appeals for the Eighth Circuit reversed the opinion of the United States District Court for the Western District of Missouri and held that the patent was invalid and that the John Deere Co. had not infringed upon it.

The other two actions which were consolidated with the Graham case, (No. 37, Calmar, Inc. v. Cook Chemical Co., and No. 43, Colgate-Palmolive Co. v. Cook Chemical Co.) were both declaratory judgment actions filed contemporaneously against Cook Chemical Company. Calmar was a producer of "hold-down" sprayers for bottles of chemicals such as insecticides, and Colgate-Palmolive was a purchaser of these sprayers. Inventor Baxter I. Scoggin Jr. had assigned his patent for sprayer design to Cook Chemical Co. Calmar and Colgate-Palmolive sought a declaration of invalidity and non-infringement of the patent, and Cook Chemical Co. sought to maintain an action for infringement. The validity of the patent was sustained by the District Court, and the Eighth Circuit affirmed.

== Decision ==
=== Background as to the patent law in the U.S. ===
Justice Clark, writing for the majority, first briefly explained the history and policy behind U.S. patent law, beginning with the Patent Act of 1790. He explained that U.S. patent law was originated by Thomas Jefferson, who based his ideas on patent law on the utilitarian economic concern of promoting technological innovation rather than protecting inventors’ moral rights to their discoveries. This was largely because Jefferson was quite suspicious of monopolies. This legal theory was embodied in the words of the Constitution itself, in the words of the Patents and Copyright Clause (Art. I, § 8, cl. 8). Thus, Jefferson intended that the limited monopoly granted by a patent was only to be permitted in order to "promote the progress of science", rather than for small details and obvious improvements.

=== The Patent Act of 1952 ===
Prior to the Patent Act of 1952, the Congress required only novelty and utility for issuance of patent, and never created any statutory requirement of nonobviousness. However, the U.S. Supreme Court, in the case of Hotchkiss v. Greenwood, invalidated a patent on the grounds that it involved only a substitution of materials rather than any real innovation. The Hotchkiss court effectively added the requirement of nonobviousness, and it had been left to the judiciary to determine whether the patent involved non-obvious invention. Following that case, the Supreme Court issued myriad decisions with an evolving and unpredictable standard for obviousness. It was not until the Congress enacted the Patent Act of 1952 that the test was to be given with some degree of predictability.

The Patent Act of 1952 added 35 U.S.C. § 103, which effectively codified nonobviousness as a requirement to show that an idea is suitable for patent protection. The section essentially requires a comparison of the subject matter sought to be patented and the prior art, to determine whether or not the subject matter of the patent as a whole would have been obvious, at the time of the invention, to a person having ordinary skill in the art. Clark held that the Congress, in passing the Act, intended to codify and clarify the common law surrounding the Patent Act by making explicit the requirement of nonobviousness.

=== Application of the law to the facts ===
Clark then examined the prosecution history and prior art of both sets of patents involved in the case. In the Graham case, the '798 patent was originally rejected by the patent examiner as being insufficiently distinguished from the previous '811 patent. The only two claims which differed between the two patents were (1) the stirrup and the bolted connection of the shank to the hinge plate do not appear in '811; and (2) the position of the shank is reversed, being placed in patent '811 above the hinge plate, sandwiched between it and the upper plate. One argument which Graham raised before the court, but had not raised before the USPTO, was that in the new '798 design, the flexing of the plow shank was limited to the points between the spring clamp and the tip of the plow shank, absorbing the shock of hard objects on the ground more efficiently. The court rejected this argument and invalidated the '798 patent for two reasons: first, Graham had not raised this "flexing" argument before the USPTO, and second, the parts in the '798 patent served the same purposes as those in the prior art.

In the matters concerning Cook Chemical, Scoggin, a corporate officer at Cook, had originally based his design on Calmar's previous unpatented design, but later claimed that the integration of the sprayer and container solved the problem of external leakage during assembly and shipping of insecticide products. The district court held that Scoggin's sprayer was not obvious because even though its individual elements were not novel, nothing in the prior art would have suggested the combination of elements. After the initial rejection of his patent, Scoggin drafted claims more carefully to distinguish the prior art, limiting new claims to the use of a rib seal, rather than a washer or gasket, to maintain a seal, as well as the existence of a small space between the overcap and the sprayer. Clark held that because Scoggin narrowed his claims to meet the limitations requested by the patent examiner, Cook Chemical could not now claim broader subject matter (see Prosecution history estoppel). Clark further held that the differences between Scoggin's design and the prior art were simply too minor and non-technical to maintain the validity of Cook's patent.

A companion case, United States v. Adams, was argued the same day and—in contrast to the holding in Graham v. Deere—held that non-obviousness was satisfied.

Graham establish practical criteria of determining of what patent claims are non-obvious. Another SCOTUS case, that followed in 2007, KSR International Co. v. Teleflex Inc., clarified what is obvious.
