= Great Atlantic & Pacific Tea Co. v. Supermarket Equipment Corp. =

A. & P. Tea Co. v. Supermarket Corp.
- Supreme Court of the United States

Argued October 18–19, 1950 Decided December 4, 1950
- Full case name: Great Atlantic & Pacific Tea Co. v. Supermarket Equipment Corp.
- Citations: 340 U.S. 147 (more) 71 S. Ct. 127; 95 L. Ed. 162; 1950 U.S. LEXIS 2604; 87 U.S.P.Q. 303

Case history
- Prior: District Court sustained the validity of certain patent claims, 78 F. Supp. 388 (E.D. Mich. 1948); Court of Appeals affirmed, 179 F.2d 636 (6th Cir. 1950); Certiorari granted, 339 U.S. 947 (1950).
- Subsequent: Rehearing denied, 340 U.S. 918 (1951).

Holding
- The extension of a counter alone is not sufficient to sustain a patent, unless, together with other old elements, it made up a new combination patentable as such. The decision of the 6th Circuit Court of Appeals is reversed.

Court membership
- Chief Justice Fred M. Vinson Associate Justices Hugo Black · Stanley F. Reed; Felix Frankfurter · William O. Douglas; Robert H. Jackson · Harold H. Burton; Tom C. Clark · Sherman Minton

Case opinions
- Majority: Jackson (unanimous)
- Concurrence: Douglas (joined by Black)

Laws applied
- Article I, section 8 of the United States Constitution

Great Atlantic & Pacific Tea Co. v. Supermarket Equipment Corp., 340 U.S. 147 (1950), is a patent case decided by the United States Supreme Court. The Court held that a patent for a cashier's counter and movable frame for grocery stores was invalid because it was a combination of known elements that added nothing new to the total stock of knowledge.

== Background ==
Patent number 2,242,408 ("the Turnham patent") claimed the invention of a cashier's counter equipped with a three-sided frame with no top or bottom which, when pushed or pulled, moved groceries deposited in it by a customer to the clerk and left them there when pushed back to repeat the operation.

The district court found that, although each element of the device was known to prior art, a counter with an extension to receive a self-unloading tray with which to push the contents of the tray in front of the cashier was a novel feature and constituted a new and useful combination. The Court of Appeals affirmed the district court's decision. Both courts found that every element claimed in the Turnham patent was known to prior art, except the extension of the counter.

== Supreme Court decision ==
The Supreme Court disagreed with the lower courts' conclusion that the extension of the counter constituted an invention because (1) the extension was not mentioned in the claim, (2) an invention cannot be found in a mere elongation of a merchant's counter, and (3) the Turnham patent overclaimed the invention by including old elements, unless together with its other old elements, the extension made up a new patentable combination. The Court explained that the key to the patentability of a mechanical device that brings old factors into cooperation is the presence or lack of invention: "[O]nly when the whole in some way exceeds the sum of its parts is the accumulation of old devices patentable." The Court concluded that the invention claimed by the Turnham patent lacked any "unusual or surprising consequences" from the combination of old elements.

The Court added that patents are intended to add to the sum of useful knowledge, and they cannot be sustained when their effect is to subtract from resources freely available. The Court also emphasized that commercial success without invention is not sufficient for purposes of patentability.

== Concurrence ==
In his concurrence, Justice Douglas stated that to be patentable, an invention must push back the frontiers of science. In his view, the Patent Office took advantage of the opportunity to expand its own jurisdiction and granted patents to inventions that had no place in the constitutional scheme of advancing scientific knowledge.
