= Inventive step and non-obviousness =

Concept in patent law

The inventive step and non-obviousness reflect a general patentability requirement present in most patent laws, according to which an invention should be sufficiently inventive—i.e., non-obvious—in order to be patented. In other words, "[the] nonobviousness principle asks whether the invention is an adequate distance beyond or above the state of the art".

The expression "inventive step" is used in European Patent Convention and in Patent Cooperation Treaty, while the expression "non-obviousness" is predominantly used in United States patent law. The expression "inventiveness" is sometimes used as well. Although the basic principle is roughly the same, the assessment of the inventive step and non-obviousness varies from one country to another. For instance, the practice of the European Patent Office (EPO) differs from the practice in the United Kingdom.

== Rationale ==
The purpose of the inventive step, or non-obviousness, requirement is to avoid granting patents for inventions which only follow from "normal product design and development", to achieve a proper balance between the incentive provided by the patent system, namely encouraging innovation, and its social cost, namely conferring temporary monopolies. In the US patent law, quid pro quo expression is used to justify the need for the non-obviousness requirement.

The non-obviousness bar is thus a measure of what society accepts as a valuable discovery. Additional reasons for the non-obviousness requirement are providing incentives for fundamental research rather than for "incremental improvements", and minimizing the "proliferation of economically insignificant patents that are expensive to search and to license".

=== Inducement theory ===
According to the inducement theory, "if an idea is so obvious that people in the field would develop it without much effort, then the incentives provided by the patent system may be unnecessary to generate the idea". Thus, there is a need "to develop some means of weeding out those inventions which would not be disclosed or devised but for the inducement of a patent." Merges and Duffy regret that "the inducement standard was not influential in the legal doctrine, and its absence from subsequent case law raises one of the great unanswered questions of patent law: How can courts continue to ignore a seemingly reasonable and theoretically solid approach to determining patentability?"

== Controversies and alternatives ==
While trying to weed out the "easy" inventions, the non-obviousness requirement brings in several downsides to the overall patent system, particularly in the pharmaceutical field, which depends on patent protection most heavily. For example,

1. "The nonobviousness standard has the ironic effect of turning progress in the pharmaceutical sciences against itself because the standard withholds patent protection from drugs based on the scientific advances that allowed researchers to identify them as ones that are likely to be effective." Pharmaceutical companies "frequently abandon promising drug candidates on account of perceived weaknesses in their patent protection". "The problem of obvious—and thus unpatentable—drugs promises to grow worse over time because the nonobviousness requirement, almost by definition, turns progress in the pharmaceutical sciences against itself; that is, it denies patent protection to new drugs based on the very advances in science that led to their discovery." "The real problem is the nature of the nonobviousness requirement itself, which withholds patent protection from the drugs that appear most promising in early research and penalizes progress in the pharmaceutical sciences. Given these strange tendencies within the doctrine, it is not surprising that drug researchers frequently encounter the nonobviousness requirement as a barrier to patenting their discoveries." "The social costs of losing such drugs likely far outweigh any benefits to the public from faster access to inexpensive generics of the unpatentable drugs that actually reach the market." "Whenever the patent rules prevent the introduction of a new drug or therapy, or even just delay it, as may be happening with finasteride (for preventing prostate cancer), the injury to the public can be severe." "Current patent policy, which withholds patent protection from drugs because they lack novelty or are obvious, therefore poses a substantial threat to the public's well-being." "the patent standards suppress pharmaceutical innovation by limiting patents to innovative new ideas for drugs such that the system offers no incentive for the development of socially valuable drugs that were disclosed or made to look promising in earlier publications." Also, it has been suggested that "since the FDA's clinical-trial requirements are the reason why firms rarely develop drugs without protection from generic competitors", the FDA should be able to administer the reward of exclusivity with the need for that protection, offering a convenient fix for the patent system's inadequacies in promoting drug development.
2. The fact that an inventor's own disclosures can be used as a prior art—not only for novelty but also for non-obviousness analysis—forces both for-profit and not-for-profit (since the Bayh–Dole Act in the US) business to delay (or to completely stop) dissemination of their research findings, complicates collaborations between different institutions, and gets in the way of the patents' constitutional purpose" to promote Progress of Science".
3. Very often the original patent on the invention, that has a very strong inventive step representing a major breakthrough invention, is filed more than 20 years before the commercialization of its technology commences, and the original inventors do not reap the fruits of their invention. Instead, people who came up later (closer to the start of the commercialization) with incremental improvements to the original technology, with such improvements have much weaker inventive step(s), get a better chance to monetize their invention(s). A famous example of such situation is Vanadium Redox-Flow Battery technology, invented and patented originally by Pelligri and Spaziante in 1978 (UK Patent 2030349, Oronzio de Nori Impianti Elettrochimici S.p.A., 1978) but not widely commercialized until ca 2017.

Although all countries with actively functional patent systems currently have a requirement for inventive step, the need for such a doctrine has been questioned. For example, "substantial novelty" has been proposed as an alternative approach. Also, many countries have, in addition to patents, utility models, which have a lower (or none) requirement for non-obviousness in return for a shorter monopoly term duration. The availability of utility model protection minimizes for inventors, developers and manufacturers the risk associated with the uncertainty of non-obviousness analysis (litigation) outcome (see below).

In the US, there is no gradation stronger inventive step - longer patent duration, and all-or-nothing approach is used. Under such a system, drawing the line between inventive(all) and obvious (nothing) is ambiguous, as numerous lawsuits with changing outcomes on appeal illustrate (e.g. Sanofi-Aventis GmbH v. Glenmark Pharmaceuticals, 748 F. 3d 1354 (Fed. Circuit 2014)). Also, unique to the United States is the possibility to introduce as the evidence of non/obviousness facts, discovered after filing the patent application in question. (e.g. Knoll Pharm. Co. v Teva Pharm. USA, Inc. 367 F.3d 1381, 1385(Fed. Circ.2004) and Genetics Inst., LLC v. Novartis Vaccines & Diagnostics, Inc. 655 F.3d 1291, 1307 (Fed.Circ.2011), In re Khelgatian 53 CCPA 1441, 364 F.2d 870, 876 (1966)).

Although the need for low bar of inventiveness has been well acknowledged, the proposed means of actually measuring such a bar have all been rather unsuccessful despite 200 years of case law history. "A standard that is clear and easy to apply consistently will mark where the non-obviousness bar exactly rests, providing society as a whole, and lawmakers in particular, with a benchmark to gauge the patent system's efficacy. Moreover, such a standard will allow the lower courts to determine non-obviousness correctly and consistently, at least hypothetically reducing uncertainty, inducing uniformity, and lowering reversal odds." Mr. Cecil D. Quillen Jr., Senior Advisor to Putnam, Hayes and Bartlett, Inc., and former General Counsel to the Eastman-Kodak Company, concurs: "The PTO should apply the same standard followed in the courts so that patentees receive a patent that is worthy of respect rather than merely an invitation to the roulette wheel of litigation." The US Supreme Court, however, has criticised the patent agency for failing to follow the same standards as the courts:

[I]t must be remembered that the primary responsibility for sifting out unpatentable material lies in the Patent Office. To await litigation is, for all practical purposes, to debilitate the patent system. We have observed a notorious difference between the standards applied by the Patent Office and by the courts. While many reasons can be adduced to explain the discrepancy, one may well be the free rein often exercised by Examiners in their use of the concept of "invention".

== Jurisdictions ==
=== Canada ===
The requirement for non-obviousness is codified under section 28.3 of the Patent Act (R.S.C., 1985, c. P-4).

28.3 The subject-matter defined by a claim in an application for a patent in Canada must be subject-matter that would not have been obvious on the claim date to a person skilled in the art or science to which it pertains, having regard to

(a) information disclosed more than one year before the filing date by the applicant, or by a person who obtained knowledge, directly or indirectly, from the applicant in such a manner that the information became available to the public in Canada or elsewhere; and
(b) information disclosed before the claim date by a person not mentioned in paragraph (a) in such a manner that the information became available to the public in Canada or elsewhere.

The Supreme Court of Canada affirmed the test for non-obviousness laid out in Windsurfing International Inc. v. Tabur Marine (Great Britain) Ltd. in Apotex Inc. v. Sanofi‑Synthelabo Canada Inc.:

1. Identify the notional "person skilled in the art" and identify the relevant common general knowledge of that person;
2. Identify the inventive concept of the claim in question or if that cannot readily be done, construe it;
3. Identify what, if any, differences exist between the matter cited as forming part of the "state of the art" and the inventive concept of the claim or the claim as construed;
4. Viewed without any knowledge of the alleged invention as claimed, do those differences constitute steps which would have been obvious to the person skilled in the art or do they require any degree of invention?

Canadian courts also recognize the equivalents of the US objective indicia, i.e. Factors That Support Patentability of an Invention:

1. Long felt but unsatisfied need for the invention while the needed implementing arts and elements had long been available;
2. Appreciation that a problem existed and what the problem was were previously unseen by those skilled in the art;
3. Substantial attempts by those skilled in the art to fill the need of (1) or the cope with difficulties arising from the failure to understand the problem of (2);
4. Commercial success of the invention causally related to the invention itself rather than to factors such as advertising or attractive packaging;
5. Replacement in the industry of the prior art devices by the patented invention;
6. Prompt copying of the patentee's invention by competitors;
7. Acquiescence by the industry to the patent's validity by honouring the patent through taking licenses or not infringing the patent, or both:
8. The existence of prior art or knowledge teaching away from the technical direction taken by the patentee;
9. Unexpectedness of the results of the invention to those skilled in the art; and
10. Disbelief and incredulity on the part of those skilled in the art that the patentee's approach worked.

=== European Patent Convention (EPC) ===
Pursuant to Article 52(1) in conjunction with Article 56, first sentence, EPC, European patents shall be granted for inventions which, among other things, involve an inventive step, that is, the invention, having regard to the state of the art, must not be obvious to a person skilled in the art.

The Examining Divisions, the Opposition Divisions, and the Boards of Appeal of the EPO almost always apply the "problem-solution approach" in order to assess and decide whether an invention involves an inventive step. The approach consists in:

1. identifying the closest prior art, the most relevant prior art, or at least a realistic starting point;
2. determining the objective technical problem, that is, determining, in the view of the closest prior art, the technical problem which the claimed invention addresses and successfully solves; and
3. examining whether or not the claimed solution to the objective technical problem is obvious for the skilled person in view of the state of the art in general.

This last step is conducted according to the "could-would approach". Pursuant to this approach, the question to address in order to assess whether the invention involves an inventive step is the following (the question is the climax of the problem-solution approach):

Is there any teaching in the prior art, as a whole, that would, not simply could, have prompted the skilled person, faced with the objective technical problem formulated when considering the technical features not disclosed by the closest prior art, to modify or adapt said closest prior art while taking account of that teaching [the teaching of the prior art, not just the teaching of the closest prior art], thereby arriving at something falling within the terms of the claims, and thus achieving what the invention achieves?

If the skilled person would have been prompted to modify the closest prior art in such a way as to arrive at something falling within the terms of the claims, then the invention does not involve an inventive step.

The point is not whether the skilled person could have arrived at the invention by adapting or modifying the closest prior art, but whether he would have done so because the prior art would have incited him to do so in the hope of solving the objective technical problem or in expectation of some improvement or advantage. This must have been the case for the skilled person before the filing or priority date valid for the claim under examination.

=== United Kingdom ===
The fundamental test for assessing whether there is an inventive step remains the statutory test: Actavis v Novartis [2010] EWCA Civ 82 at [17]. That test is as follows: an invention shall be taken to involve an inventive step if it is 'not obvious' to 'a person skilled in the art', having regard to any matter which forms part of the 'state of the art' by virtue of section 2(2): s 3 Patents Act 1977.

Courts of the United Kingdom have adopted a general framework to assist in approaching (not answering) the fundamental statutory test. It is known as the Windsurfing or Pozzoli test.

In Windsurfing International Inc. v Tabur Marine (GB) Ltd. [1985] RPC 59 the Court of Appeal suggested the following framework:

1. Identify the inventive concept embodied in the patent;
2. Impute to a normally skilled but unimaginative addressee what was common general knowledge in the art at the priority date;
3. Identify the differences (if any) between the matter cited and the alleged invention; and
4. Decide whether those differences (viewed without any knowledge of the alleged invention) constituted steps which would have been 'obvious' to the skilled man, or whether they required any degree of invention.

This test has been slightly reworked in the more recent Court of Appeal case Pozzoli Spa v BDMO SA & Anor [2007] EWCA Civ 588 (22 June 2007):

1. (a) Identify the notional "person skilled in the art", (b) Identify the relevant common general knowledge of that person;
2. Identify the inventive concept of the claim in question or if that cannot readily be done, construe it;
3. Identify what, if any, differences exist between the matter cited as forming part of the "state of the art" and the inventive concept of the claim or the claim as construed;
4. Viewed without any knowledge of the alleged invention as claimed, do those differences constitute steps which would have been obvious to the person skilled in the art or do they require any degree of invention?

In Schlumberger Holdings Ltd versus Electromagnetic Geoservices AS [2010] EWCA Civ 819 (28 July 2010), the Court of Appeal clarified that the fictional skilled addressee (which may be a skilled team) used for determining inventive step can vary from the one used for determining claim construction or sufficiency.

=== United States ===
"Non-obviousness" is the term used in US patent law to describe one of the requirements that an invention must meet to qualify for patentability, codified in 35 U.S.C. §103 in 1952. One of the main requirements of patentability in the U.S. is that the invention being patented is not obvious, meaning that a "person having ordinary skill in the art" (PHOSITA) would not know how to solve the problem at which the invention is directed by using exactly the same mechanism. Since the PHOSITA standard turned to be too ambiguous in practice, the U.S. Supreme Court provided later two more useful approaches, which currently control the practical analysis of non-obviousness by patent examiners and courts: Graham et al. v. John Deere Co. of Kansas City et al., 383 U.S. 1 (1966) gives guidelines of what is "non-obvious", and KSR v. Teleflex (2006) gives guidelines of what is "obvious".

== See also ==
- Priority right
- Cripps question
