= Misappropriation doctrine =

The misappropriation doctrine is a U.S. legal theory conferring a "quasi-property right" on a person who invests "labor, skill, and money" to create an intangible asset. The right operates against another person (usually a competitor of the first person) "endeavoring to reap where it has not sown" by "misappropriating" the value of the asset (ordinarily by copying what the first person has created). The quoted language and the legal principle come from the decision of the United States Supreme Court in International News Service v. Associated Press, 248 U.S. 215 (1918), also known as INS v. AP or simply the INS case.

The misappropriation doctrine originated as federal common law but since 1938 it has been based on state law. The current viability of the misappropriation doctrine is uncertain because of subsequent developments in U.S. patent and copyright law that "preempt" state law that operates in the same field of law, as is explained in the article on INS v. AP.

== Legal setting in which doctrine arose ==
=== Why doctrine developed under federal law but is now under state law ===
In 1918 when the Supreme Court decided the INS case, a body of federal common law concerning business practices and torts existed that the Supreme Court had power to declare or create. This legal regime stemmed from the 1842 decision of the Supreme Court in Swift v. Tyson. That case held that the federal courts, when deciding legal issues not specifically addressed by the applicable state legislature, had the authority to develop a federal common law. In 1938, however, in Erie Railroad Co. v. Tompkins, the Supreme Court overruled Swift v. Tyson. Consequently, since that time the misappropriation doctrine fell under the control of the laws of the various states, which were therefore free to accept or reject it.

=== Previous state of unfair competition law ===
Before the INS case, unfair competition law was generally considered to be limited to cases of "palming off"—where the defendant deceived customers by causing them erroneously to believe that the defendant's product emanated from the plaintiff, and as a result diverted trade from the plaintiff to the defendant. The INS case extended the concept of unfair competition to a much wider range of business conduct, based on the particular court's concept of morality.

== The INS case ==
=== Background ===
The INS case, the cornerstone of the misappropriation doctrine, arose out of a dispute between two news gathering organizations, the Associated Press (AP) and the International News Service (INS) over reporting World War I news. The Allied Powers (England and France) perceived William Randolph Hearst's INS to be unduly favorable to the Central Powers (Germany and Austria); therefore, the Allies barred INS from using Allied telegraph lines to report news; this effectively prevented INS from reporting war news. To deal with this, INS copied AP's news bulletins from publicly accessible sources, rewrite them, and distributed the rewrites to INS's client newspapers. The AP then brought an action seeking to enjoin INS from copying AP-gathered news.

=== Supreme Court ruling ===
The Supreme Court ruled in favor of the AP, with Justice Pitney writing for the majority. Justices Holmes and Brandeis wrote dissents.

==== Majority opinion ====
The majority opinion by Justice Pitney recognized that the information found in the AP news was not copyrightable. Instead, Pitney approached the issue from the perspective of unfair competition. He found that there was a "quasi-property right" in the fresh news as it is "stock in trade to be gathered at the cost of enterprise, organization, skill, labor and money, and to be distributed and sold to those who will pay money for it." Given the "economic value" of the news, a company can "therefore" have a limited property interest in it against a competitor (but not against the general public) who would attempt to take unfair advantage of the information.

The Court characterized INS's behavior as "misappropriation." Due to the tenuous value of "hot" news, Pitney narrowed the period for which the proprietary right would apply: copying was forbidden "only to the extent necessary to prevent that competitor from reaping the fruits of complainant's efforts and expenditure."

The Court justified its creation of a "quasi-property right" in these terms:

[INS] is taking material that has been acquired by AP as the result of organization and the expenditure of labor, skill, and money, and which is salable by AP for money, and that INS in appropriating it and selling it as its own is endeavoring to reap where it has not sown, and by disposing of it to newspapers that are competitors of AP's members is appropriating to itself the harvest of those who have sown.

[A] court of equity ought not to hesitate long in characterizing it as unfair competition in business.

. . . [H]e who has fairly paid the price should have the beneficial use of the property. It is no answer to say that AP spends its money for that which is too fugitive or evanescent to be the subject of property. That might, and for the purposes of the discussion we are assuming that it would furnish an answer in a common-law controversy. But in a court of equity, where the question is one of unfair competition, if that which AP has acquired fairly at substantial cost may be sold fairly at substantial profit, a competitor who is misappropriating it for the purpose of disposing of it to his own profit and to the disadvantage of AP cannot be heard to say that it is too fugitive or evanescent to be regarded as property. It has all the attributes of property necessary for determining that a misappropriation of it by a competitor is unfair competition because contrary to good conscience.

==== Holmes dissent ====
Justice Holmes dissented, arguing that the law of unfair competition requires a misrepresentation. If the misrepresentation here is that some people may think AP copied the news from INS, the proper remedy would be only to prohibit INS (for a limited time) from copying from AP unless it provides a notice that it copied from AP.

==== Brandeis dissent ====
Justice Brandeis dissented on the grounds that "reaping where another sowed" is not an actionable tort: "[O]rdinarily one is at perfect liberty to find out, if he can by lawful means, trade secrets of another, however valuable, and then use the knowledge so acquired gainfully, although it cost the original owner much in effort and in money to collect or produce."

Brandeis closed his dissent with an argument that the Court was ill-suited to act as a legislature and the matter should be left to the wisdom of Congress:

The creation or recognition by courts of a new private right may work serious injury to the general public, unless the boundaries of the right are definitely established and wisely guarded. ... A Legislature, urged to enact a law by which one news agency or newspaper may prevent appropriation of the fruits of its labors by another, would consider . . . [possible adverse effects on the public and other businesses]. Legislators might conclude that it was impossible to put an end to the obvious injustice involved in such appropriation of news, without opening the door to other evils, greater than that sought to be remedied. Courts are ill-equipped to make the investigations which should precede a determination of the limitations which should be set upon any property right in news or of the circumstances under which news gathered by a private agency should be deemed affected with a public interest. Courts would be powerless to prescribe the detailed regulations essential to full enjoyment of the rights conferred or to introduce the machinery required for enforcement of such regulations. Considerations such as these should lead us to decline to establish a new rule of law . . .

== Subsequent developments ==
Although INS was a landmark case when it was decided, subsequent developments have diminished its significance and that of the misappropriation doctrine. A leading copyright law scholar has commented:

It has been suggested that the credence due the International News Service case today is minimal: that subsequent decisions have restricted its [misappropriation] doctrine to the news context and that, in any event, it is but a derelict of the federal common law, untenable after Erie R.R. v. Tompkins.

Seventh Circuit Judge Posner similarly remarked that INS is "a decision no longer authoritative because it was based on the federal courts' subsequently abandoned authority to formulate common law principles . . . .

The misappropriation doctrine still persists, however, in the area of "hot news" and other time-value information and in those states that give the INS doctrine expansive scope against "immoral" commercial behavior, typically involving copying.

An additional factor affecting the scope and viability of the misappropriation doctrine has been the development of the federal preemption doctrine since the 1960s. This doctrine makes state law ineffective when it conflicts with or disturbs the balance between competition and monopoly struck in the federal intellectual property laws. On the other hand, the misappropriation doctrine has not been preempted in areas where a type of copying is not regulated under federal copyright or patent law. But the limits of this dispensation are uncertain: the boundary condition may be that state law may operate so long as the omission from federal regulation is not the result of a congressional decision that the area should be left open to free competition; an alternative boundary rule may be that the state law must not upset a delicate balance which the court perceives that the federal system has struck.

=== Effect of Kellogg case ===
In Kellogg Co. v. National Biscuit Co., in 1938, the Supreme Court considered a case arguably akin to INS but (with Justice Brandeis now writing for the Court's majority instead of dissenting as in INS) denied relief. The Kellogg Court said:

Kellogg Company is undoubtedly sharing in the goodwill of the article known as Shredded Wheat; and thus is sharing in a market which was created by the skill and judgment of plaintiff's predecessor and has been widely extended by vast expenditures in advertising persistently made. But that is not unfair. Sharing in the goodwill of an article unprotected by patent or trade-mark is the exercise of a right possessed by all—and in the free exercise of which the consuming public is deeply interested.

One commentator maintained that one could properly—

... view Kellogg as vindication of the views that he [Brandeis] expressed in INS. That Nabisco had invested in the shredded wheat product did not give it control over the use of the pillow shape (or the term SHREDDED WHEAT); it had no property right against misappropriation of the shape after the expiry of the patents. Instead, Brandeis inquired [only] whether Kellogg had engaged in any acts of misrepresentation.

Since Kellogg did not misrepresent its version of Shredded Wheat, the Court held it free to appropriate the unpatented, uncopyrighted biscuit features regardless of Nabisco's expenditure of labor, skill, and money, and it allowed Kellogg to reap where Nabisco had sown.

=== Effect of Sears and Compco cases ===
In Sears v. Stiffel and Compco v. Day-Brite, the defendants copied the unpatented, uncopyrighted product designs of the plaintiffs. The lower courts had applied what amounted to the INS misappropriation doctrine to hold the defendants guilty of unfair competition. The Supreme Court reversed, holding that state law was being used to create a state-law equivalent of the federal patent system, and that disturbed the balance Congress had struck in this area. One commentator explained: "Though International News Service has never been expressly overruled, the Court was, in Sears and Compco, apparently rejecting its approach.

In 1989, the Court struck down a state law protecting boat designs that were neither patented nor copyrighted, in Bonito Boats, Inc. v. Thunder Craft Boats, Inc., thus reaffirming the preemption rule of the Sears and Compco cases barring INS-like protection of product designs where the patent or copyright laws might otherwise apply.

On the other hand, the Court has permitted state misappropriation law to apply against copying in areas not regulated by federal law, such as sound recordings before 1978. A comparison of these decisions with the 1989 Bonito Boats decision may suggest a less preemptive approach to subject matter in the neighborhood of copyright than in the neighborhood of patent law.

=== "Hot news" cases ===
In a number of cases, courts have applied the misappropriation doctrine to copying in fact settings analogous to the circumstances of the INS case—a competitor's appropriation of information that is costly to generate and that has value for only a limited time.

The original core holding and narrowest implication of INS was that there was now a "hot news" doctrine that protected first comers in their creation of an ephemeral, time-sensitive information asset at appreciable expense against "free riders." The Second Circuit addressed this concept in National Basketball Association v. Motorola, Inc. (NBA). But the Second Circuit imposed precise limits on the rule to avoid possible conflict with copyright law and the First Amendment. It held that under New York State law, a "hot-news," INS-like claim exists only in cases where:

(i) a plaintiff generates or gathers information at a cost;

(ii) the information is time-sensitive;

(iii) a defendant's use of the information constitutes free riding on the plaintiff's efforts;

(iv) the defendant is in direct competition with a product or service offered by the plaintiffs; and

(v) the ability of other parties to free-ride on the efforts of the plaintiff or others would so reduce the incentive to produce the product or service that its existence or quality would be substantially threatened.

The Second Circuit held that the "hot news" tort was largely preempted by the 1976 Copyright Act, in this case, and it tailored the five factors to avoid such preemption. The effect was to limit the scope of the hot-news branch of the misappropriation doctrine largely to the facts of the INS case.

=== Other copying ===
The language of the INS case can be interpreted to cover conduct quite different in kind from the appropriation of hot news. Some states, such as New Jersey and Wisconsin, and at times New York, have applied the doctrine more broadly to cover any conduct that the courts deemed "immoral" under open-ended, flexible, adaptable, capacious, and amorphous standards.

For example, the Second Circuit at one point spoke sweepingly of the scope of the New York misappropriation doctrine in these terms:

New York courts have noted the incalculable variety of illegal practices falling within the unfair competition rubric, calling it a broad and flexible doctrine that depends more upon the facts set forth than in most causes of action. It has been broadly described as encompassing any form of commercial immorality, or simply as endeavoring to reap where one has not sown; it is taking the skill, expenditures and labors of a competitor, and misappropriating for the commercial advantage of one person a benefit or property right belonging to another. The tort is adaptable and capacious.

In addition, the determinative factor is "whether the acts of a defendant are 'fair or unfair, according to principles recognized in equity, and not by 'the morals of the market place.'"

Similarly, New Jersey courts have said that state's unfair competition law is a matter of determining what is "fair play." More generally, the Third Circuit said of New Jersey unfair competition law:

New Jersey's common law of unfair competition does not have clear boundaries but is instead flexible and elastic as evolving standards of morality demand, and the essence of an unfair competition claim is the enforcement of fair play.

New Jersey courts have therefore placed great focus on what they perceived to be the moral and ethical quality of the defendant's conduct. They recognize that their "law of unfair competition is an amorphous area of jurisprudence. It knows no clear boundaries."

In Mercury Records Productions, Inc. v. Economic Consultants, Inc., the Wisconsin Supreme Court held that INS states the applicable law for Wisconsin: "The unfair competition-misappropriation theory applied in INS . . . comports with the theory" of the Wisconsin courts and "is consistent with the public policy of the state of Wisconsin"; that state policy is "simply simply the principles of old-fashioned honesty," meaning that "[o]ne man may not reap where another has sown nor gather where another has strewn."

California, Illinois, Missouri, New Jersey, New York, North Carolina, South Carolina, and Wisconsin applied the INS misappropriation doctrine to enjoin those copying records (so-called record piracy) during the period when federal copyright law did not cover sound recordings.

But those courts have applied the misappropriation doctrine, as well, to other forms of copying, such as copying of products. Many of these cases were decided before the Supreme Court's Sears, Compco, and Bonito Boats decisions, which have raised preemption issues as to some of these misappropriation decisions.

For example, in a 1940 case under New York law, the defendant copied the ornamental design of the plaintiff's silverplate as well as "a similar system of advertising, copied at least in part by the defendant; and high pressure salesmanship in obtaining a wide market amongst dealers by offering attractively a greater number of pieces in a set of inferior quality at a much lower price," while pointing out to the dealers that they could sell the defendant's silverware to customers instead of the plaintiff's because "purchasers would readily believe that the old pattern or a new one of similar type was being offered at a bargain." In this manner, the defendant succeeded in "attracting the interest of a class having some knowledge of patterns but being largely uninformed and undiscriminating concerning the quality of the wares and the reputation and business standing of different manufacturers, who are attracted by offers of a bargain." The court held that this was unfair competition, under the standard that "whether the acts of a defendant are 'fair or unfair, [must be judged] according to principles recognized in equity, and not by 'the morals of the market place.'"

In another New York case, the defendant copied the plaintiff's unpatented, uncopyrighted "Mustard Seed Remembrancer" locket, containing a mustard seed to remind users of the power of "so much faith as a grain of mustard" to move mountains (Matt. 17:20). The court found misappropriation under the INS doctrine. It also cited and relied upon the concept of unfair competition described in the preceding silverplate case. The court specifically declined to follow the Kellogg decision, discussed earlier.

In 1985, in a subsequent case under New York law, involving the copying of ornamental jewelry designs, the defendant asserted preemption as a defense. The district court opined in dicta—"Were Gemveto's claim predicated solely upon Cooper's having copied plaintiff's jewelry designs [i.e., New York misappropriation law] the claim perhaps would be preempted by federal law." But "there was proof not only that Cooper copied Gemveto's products but of a deliberate attempt by Cooper to deceive the consuming public as to the source of its "knockoffs" and thereby to appropriate the goodwill or reputation of Gemveto, a rival seller." Therefore, it was proper to enjoin the defendant under New York's law against palming off, the district court ruled, without reaching the issue of whether federal copyright or patent law preempted New York's misappropriation law against product imitation. On appeal, the Second Circuit vacated the district court's injunction against copying, because it was insufficiently clear as to what palming-off activity the defendant was prohibited from engaging in. The final order by the district court permanently enjoined Cooper "from selling or offering for sale any item of jewelry that is confusingly similar in appearance to any item of plaintiff's jewelry such that the sale or offer for sale of such item, by any method or means, is calculated to deceive the public as to its source. ... " But "the Sears and Compco decisions . . . hold that copying of the article itself that is unprotected by the federal patent and copyright laws cannot be protected by state law," the Second Circuit stated. To avoid colliding with Sears-Compco, the district court had to enter an order with "an appropriate re-wording of the injunction to specify Cooper's acts which would, if not enjoined, constitute palming-off under New York common law." The court ruled that the injunction must be directed against deceptive conduct (palming off), not the nature of the product; under Compco, for example, the defendant had a right to make a confusingly similar jewelry item, so long as it did not engage in deceptive palming off.

A much more recent jewelry-copying case under New York law appears to state the current view of New York's misappropriation law, as applied to both patent and copyright preemption (outside the "hot news" field):

In order to avoid preemption, that which is claimed to be unfair competition must be something different from copying, or the fruits of copying, or the intent or bad faith that can be inferred from the act of copying; if the harm [to plaintiff] arises from the simple fact of copying, the claim falls within the Copyright Act [or patent law] and is preempted.

When the claim is in substance based on mere copying, it will be dismissed. More generally, the Second Circuit has said of preemption and the misappropriation doctrine:

[W]e believe that Metropolitan Opera 's broad misappropriation doctrine based on amorphous concepts such as "commercial immorality" or society's "ethics" is preempted. Such concepts are virtually synonymous for wrongful copying and are in no meaningful fashion distinguishable from infringement of a copyright.

Other circuits have treated the misappropriation doctrine and preemption boundary similarly to the Second Circuit's line of cases. They require the state-law claim to be based on something significantly or "qualitatively" extra, beyond mere copying of the plaintiff's product or service to avoid preemption. Many of these cases hold that "commercial immorality" plus copying is no more than copying alone for preemption purposes.

The citations in this Article are written in Bluebook style. Please see the Talk page for this Article.
