= Victoria Park Racing & Recreation Grounds Co Ltd v Taylor =

High Court of Australia case

Victoria Park Racing and Recreation Grounds Co. Ltd v. Taylor
- Court: High Court of Australia
- Decided: 26 August 1937
- Citations: [1937] HCA 45, (1937) 58 CLR 479

Case history
- Prior actions: Victoria Park Racing & Recreation Grounds Co Ltd v Taylor [1936] NSWStRp 55, (1936) 37 SR (NSW) 322
- Appealed from: Supreme Court of New South Wales

Court membership
- Judges sitting: Latham CJ, Rich, Dixon, Evatt and McTiernan JJ

Victoria Park Racing & Recreation Grounds Co Ltd v Taylor, commonly referred as the Victoria Park Racing case, is a leading case of the High Court of Australia on determining whether property rights exist, and protecting claims in property for the purposes of tort law. It is also notable in its rejection of the concepts of quasi-property and privacy in the framework of the common law. It has been observed that the concept of property itself cannot be entirely satisfactorily explained without accounting, in some way or other, for the ruling in this case.

In the 1930s, radio broadcasting in Australia challenged the monopolies of racing clubs, who exercised tight control over access to the racecourse, supported by existing laws, with minimal media reporting in the form of scores scratched on boards at the racecourse and more detailed newspaper summaries after the event.

== Background ==
The plaintiff owned Victoria Park, a racing track in south Sydney, which charged admissions to people who placed bets on the races. The racecourse was surrounded by a very high fence. Taylor, who had a house and front yard adjacent to the course, allowed the radio broadcasting station 2UW to construct a five-metre high platform on scaffolding from which someone could see into the course and broadcast – with the help of binoculars – the races and information about horses posted at the ground, which facilitated unregulated off-track betting. Attendance at the ground plummeted.

The Plaintiff claimed that on-track betting was lower as a result of the broadcasts, as people who had previously come to the track were now listening on the radio instead and Taylor was profiting at the expense of the plaintiff.

He applied to the Supreme Court of New South Wales for an injunction against Taylor on the footing of nuisance and breach of copyright. Privacy and non-natural use of property were also cited as grounds. It was common ground that the mere construction and use of the raised platform constituted no breach of building or zoning regulations or of the betting and gaming legislation or indeed of the regulations governing broadcasting.

The injunction was denied, and the decision was appealed to the High Court.

== Ruling at the High Court ==
In a 3–2 decision, the appeal was dismissed, as no wrong was committed that was known to the law. Separate opinions were issued by all justices — Latham CJ, Dixon and McTiernan JJ for the majority, and Rich and Evatt JJ in dissent.

- There was no property in a spectacle. As Latham CJ noted:

I find difficulty in attaching any precise meaning to the phrase "property in a spectacle." A "spectacle" cannot be "owned" in any ordinary sense of that word. Even if there were any legal principle which prevented one person from gaining an advantage for himself or causing damage to another by describing a spectacle produced by that other person, the rights of the latter person could be described as property only in a metaphorical sense. Any appropriateness in the metaphor would depend upon the existence of the legal principle. The principle cannot itself be based upon such a metaphor.

- Nor could copyright be claimed in any information being posted on signs in the park:

The law of copyright does not operate to give any person an exclusive right to state or to describe particular facts. A person cannot by first announcing that a man fell off a bus or that a particular horse won a race prevent other people from stating those facts.

- There was no proof that nuisance had been brought upon the race track, as McTiernan J observed:

It is not shown that the broadcasting interferes with the use and enjoyment of the land or the conduct of the race meetings or the comfort or enjoyment of any of the plaintiff's patrons. Indeed, it appears quite impossible that any such result would be caused by the action of Angles in standing on this platform aloof from the racecourse, observing the races and talking into a microphone or telephone. The principle upon which liability for acts in the nature of nuisance is founded is not to be restrained by the instances in which that liability has been found to exist. The list of acts which may give rise to an action on the case in the nature of nuisance is not closed against broadcasting. But to broadcast a lawful description of what is happening on premises cannot be an actionable nuisance at least unless it causes substantial interference with the use and enjoyment of the premises.

- The Court did not recognize the existence of a legal right to privacy. As Latham CJ stated:

With regard to the question of privacy, no doubt the owner of a house would prefer that a neighbour should not have the right of looking into his windows or yard, but neither this court nor a court of law will interfere on the mere ground of invasion of privacy; and a party has a right even to open new windows, although he is thereby enabled to overlook his neighbour's premises, and so interfering, perhaps, with his comfort.

- Building the platform was not an unnatural use of property, as it did not breach any bylaws.

== Impact ==
The case was notable for rejecting the concept of quasi-property that had been recently adopted by the United States Supreme Court in International News Service v. Associated Press, and has been influential in many common law jurisdictions in the Commonwealth. The reluctance was summarized by Dixon J thus:

If English law had followed the course of development that has recently taken place in the United States, the "broadcasting rights" in respect of the races might have been protected as part of the quasi-property created by the enterprise, organization and labour of the plaintiff in establishing and equipping a racecourse and doing all that is necessary to conduct race meetings. But courts of equity have not in British jurisdictions thrown the protection of an injunction around all the intangible elements of value, that is, value in exchange, which may flow from the exercise by an individual of his powers or resources whether in the organization of a business or undertaking or the use of ingenuity, knowledge, skill or labour. This is sufficiently evidenced by the history of the law of copyright and by the fact that the exclusive right to invention, trade marks, designs, trade name and reputation are dealt with in English law as special heads of protected interests and not under a wide generalization.

As to the question of privacy in Australian law, the High Court subsequently declared in ABC v Lenah Game Meats Pty Ltd that Victoria Park was not a case about privacy. Rather, it was concerned with allocating the right to appropriate and control how information can be made public.

== Aftermath ==
Off-track betting was subsequently brought under State regulation in New South Wales by the Gaming and Betting (Amendment) Act 1938, and the Parliament of Australia later passed the Broadcasting and Television Act 1956, prohibiting television stations (but not radio stations) from televising "the whole or part of a sporting event or other entertainment held in Australia … in a place in which a charge is made for admission, if the images of the sporting event or other entertainment originate from the use of equipment outside that place". Radio stations were not included, as they had previously reached an agreement on the matter with the racecourse owners.
