= White Court (justices) =

Period of the US Supreme Court from 1910 to 1921

Supreme Court of the United States
White Court
- Fuller Court ← → Taft Court
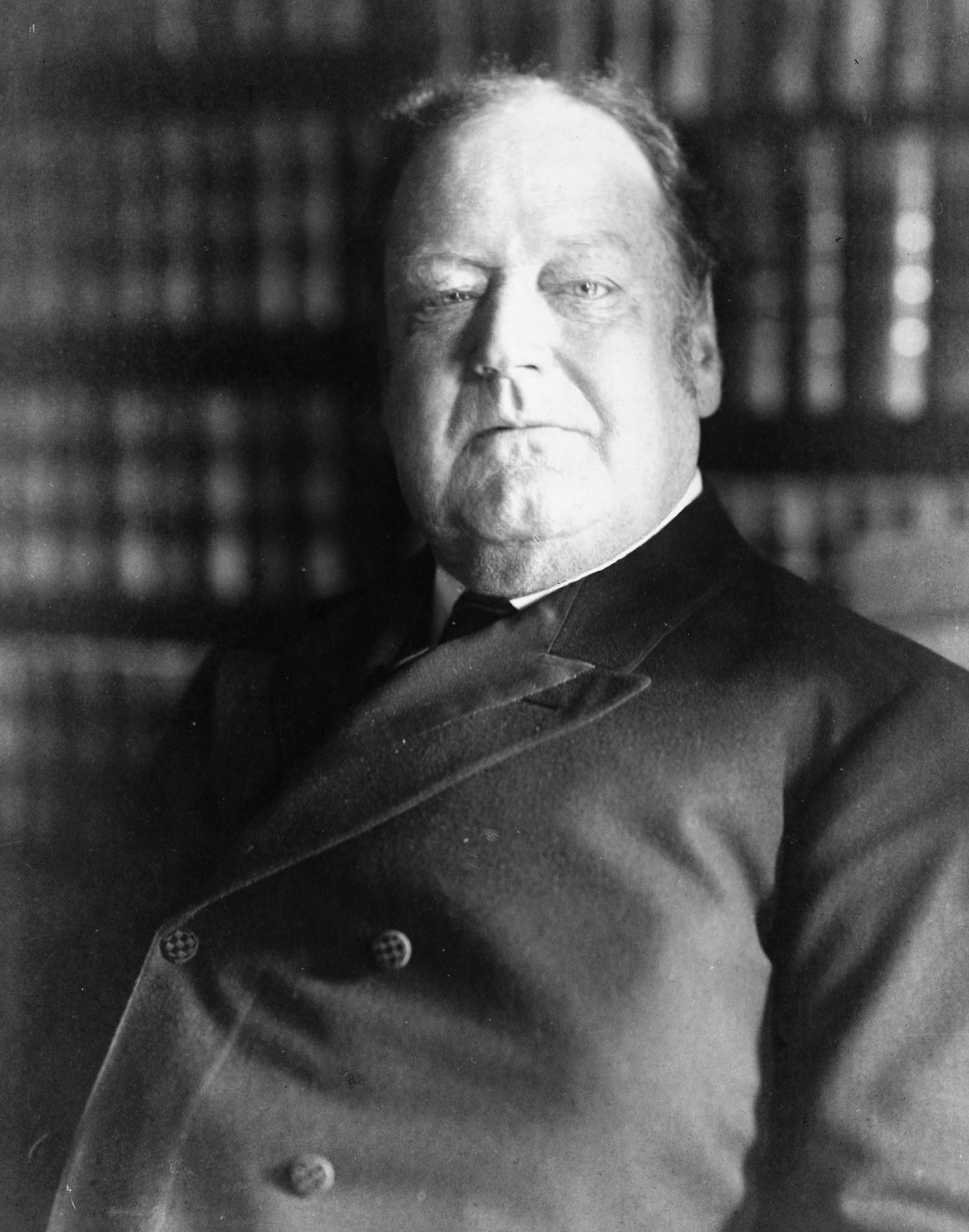
- Chief Justice Edward Douglass White
- December 18, 1910 – May 19, 1921 (10 years, 152 days)
- Seat: Old Senate Chamber; Washington, D.C.
- No. of positions: 9
- White Court decisions

The White Court refers to the Supreme Court of the United States from 1910 to 1921, when Edward Douglass White served as the Chief Justice of the United States. White, who had been an associate justice since 1894, succeeded Melville Fuller as Chief Justice after Fuller's death, and White served as Chief Justice until his own death a decade later. He was the first sitting associate justice to be elevated to Chief justice in the Court's history. He was succeeded by the former president William Howard Taft.

The White Court was less conservative than the preceding Fuller Court, though conservatism remained a powerful force on the bench (and would remain so until the early 1930s). The most notable legacy of White's chief-justiceship was the development of the rule of reason doctrine, used to interpret the Sherman Antitrust Act, and foundational to United States antitrust law. During this era the Court also established that the Fourteenth Amendment protected the "liberty of contract." On the grounds of the Fourteenth Amendment and other provisions of the Constitution, it controversially overturned many state and federal laws designed to the civil service.

== Membership ==
The White Court began in December 1910 when President William Howard Taft appointed White to succeed Melville Fuller as Chief Justice. White was the first sitting associate justice to be appointed as Chief Justice. Earlier in 1910, Taft had appointed Horace Harmon Lurton and Charles Evans Hughes to the Supreme Court. In 1911, Taft appointed Willis Van Devanter and Joseph Rucker Lamar to the court, filling vacancies that had arisen in 1910. The White Court thus began with the five Taft appointees and four veterans of the Fuller Court: John Marshall Harlan, Joseph McKenna, Oliver Wendell Holmes Jr., and William R. Day. Harlan died in 1911, and Taft appointed Mahlon Pitney to replace him. Lurton died in 1914, and President Woodrow Wilson appointed James Clark McReynolds to replace him.

In 1916, Lamar died and Hughes resigned to accept the Republican nomination for president. Wilson appointed Louis Brandeis and John Hessin Clarke to replace them. The White Court ended with White's death in 1921; President Warren G. Harding appointed Taft as White's successor.

=== Timeline ===
Bar key:
Hayes appointee McKinley appointee T. Roosevelt appointee Taft appointee Wilson appointee

Note: Edward Douglass White is listed as a Taft appointee due to his elevation to the position of Chief Justice by Taft in 1910, but he was initially appointed to the court by Grover Cleveland.

== Other branches ==
Presidents during this court included William Howard Taft, Woodrow Wilson, and Warren G. Harding. Congresses during this court included 61st through the 67th United States Congresses.

== Rulings of the Court ==
- Standard Oil Co. of New Jersey v. United States (1911): In a decision written by Chief Justice White, the court upheld the government's prosecution of Standard Oil as valid under the Commerce Clause and the Sherman Antitrust Act. The decision resulted in the break-up of Standard Oil. United States v. American Tobacco Co. (1911) was decided on the same day for similar reasons, and led to the break-up of American Tobacco Company.
- Houston East & West Texas Railway Co. v. United States (1914): In a decision written by Justice Hughes, the court allowed the Interstate Commerce Commission to regulate intrastate railroad rates, ruling that the ICC could regulate activity that has a "close and substantial relation" to interstate commerce.
- Guinn v. United States (1915): In a decision written by Chief Justice White, the court found grandfather clause exemptions to literacy tests to be unconstitutional. The court held that such clauses violated the Fifteenth Amendment, though Southern states continued to find ways to disenfranchise African-American voters.
- Brushaber v. Union Pacific Railroad Co. (1916): In a decision written by Chief Justice White, the court upheld the federal income tax imposed by the Revenue Act of 1913.
- Selective Draft Law Cases (1918): In a decision written by Chief Justice White, the court upheld the Selective Service Act of 1917, which provided for conscription.
- Hammer v. Dagenhart (1918): In a 5–4 decision written by Justice Day, the court struck down the Keating–Owen Act, which sought to limit the use of child labor. The court held manufacturing itself does not constitute interstate commerce, and thus Congress did not have the power to regulate manufacturing conditions. Hammer was overruled by United States v. Darby Lumber Co. (1941).
- International News Service v. Associated Press (1918): In a decision written by Justice Pitney, the court formulated the misappropriation doctrine of federal intellectual property law. The case arose from the International News Service's copying of reports about World War I written by the Associated Press, and the court held that the AP reports qualified as quasi-property.
- Schenck v. United States (1919): In a decision written by Justice Holmes, the court upheld the Espionage Act of 1917 and the conviction of Charles Schenck, a socialist organizer who handed out leaflets urging draftees to refuse to serve in World War I. Holmes laid out the clear and present danger doctrine to determine what speech was not protected by the First Amendment. A similar case, Debs v. United States (1919), upheld the conviction of perennial socialist presidential candidate Eugene V. Debs.
- Abrams v. United States (1919): In a decision written by Justice Clarke, the court upheld the Sedition Act of 1918 and the conviction of several defendants who had printed leaflets denouncing the American intervention in the Russian Civil War. In a dissenting opinion, Justice Holmes argued that the defendants did not present a clear and present danger, and also noted that the Sedition Act only applied to the First World War.
- Missouri v. Holland (1920): In a decision written by Justice Holmes, the court upheld the Migratory Bird Treaty Act of 1918, which regulated the hunting of migratory waterfowl. The decision held that treaties take precedence over state law, and that the treaty did not violate the Tenth Amendment.
- United States v. Wheeler (1920): In a decision written by Chief Justice White, the court held that the Privileges and Immunities Clause establishes a right to travel.
- Newberry v. United States (1921): In a decision written by Justice McReynolds, the court overturned the conviction of Truman Handy Newberry and held that Congress has no authority to regulate the nominations processes of political parties. The decision struck down spending limits established by the Federal Corrupt Practices Act. The case stemmed from the 1918 Senate elections, in which Newberry defeated Henry Ford to win office as Senator from Michigan.

== Judicial philosophy ==
Though the White Court continued to strike down some economic regulations and issue conservative rulings, it was more open to such regulations than the other courts that preceded the New Deal. The White Court issued several favorable rulings towards an expanded interpretation of the Commerce Clause and taxing powers, although Hammer stands as a notable exception to this trend. The White Court also issued notable rulings in the wake of World War I, and the court generally ruled in favor of the government. After the 1916 appointments, the court had three ideological wings: Holmes, Brandeis, and Clarke were the progressives, McKenna, White, Pitney, and Day were centrists, and McReynolds and Van Devanter were conservative. Prior to his resignation, Hughes was often considered a progressive, while Lurton and Lamar did not serve long enough to develop strong ideological leanings. Regardless of the ideological blocs, consensual norms and the high load of relatively mundane cases faced by the Supreme Court prior to the Judiciary Act of 1925 meant that many cases were decided unanimously.

== Gallery ==
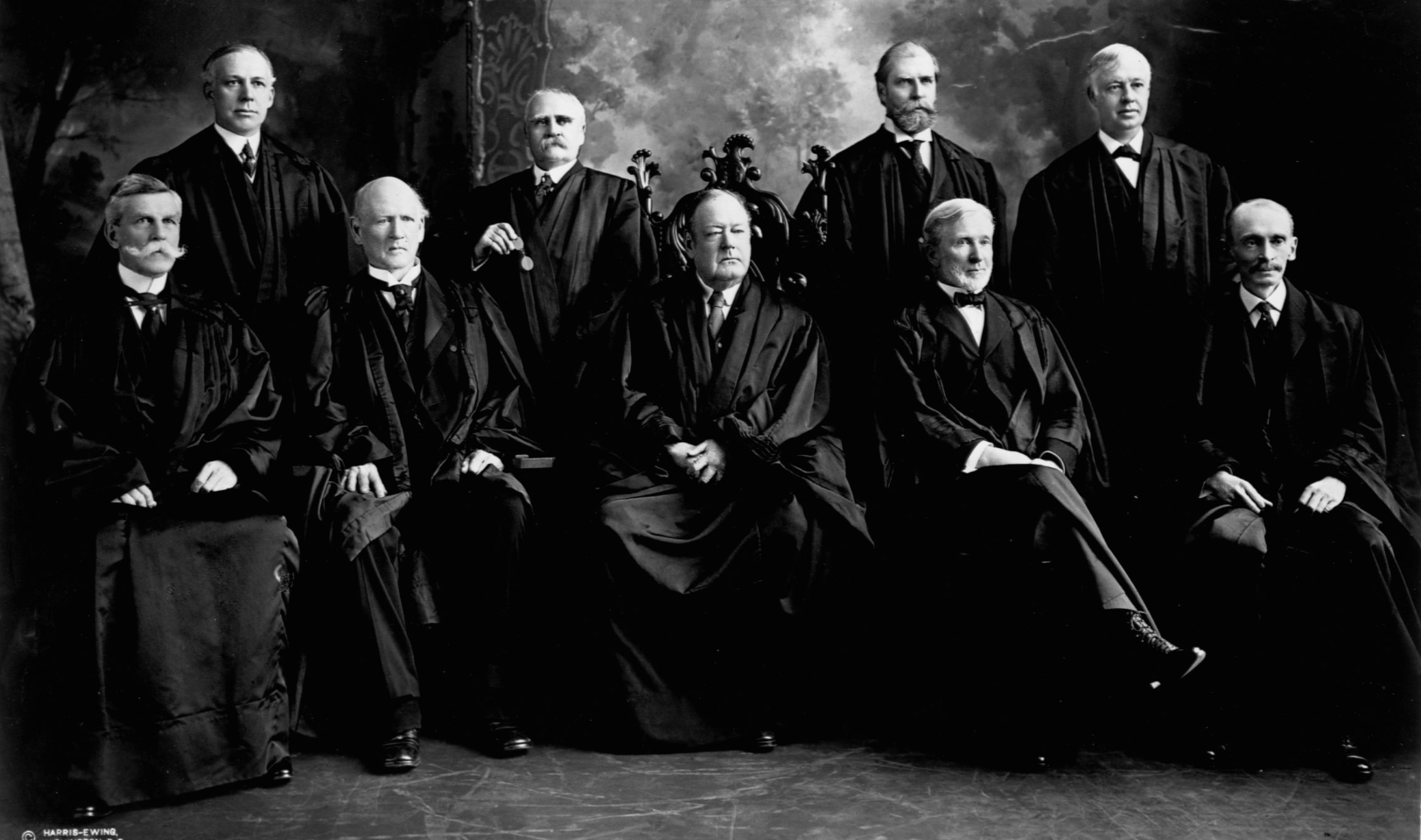
White Court
(January 3, 1911 – October 14, 1911)

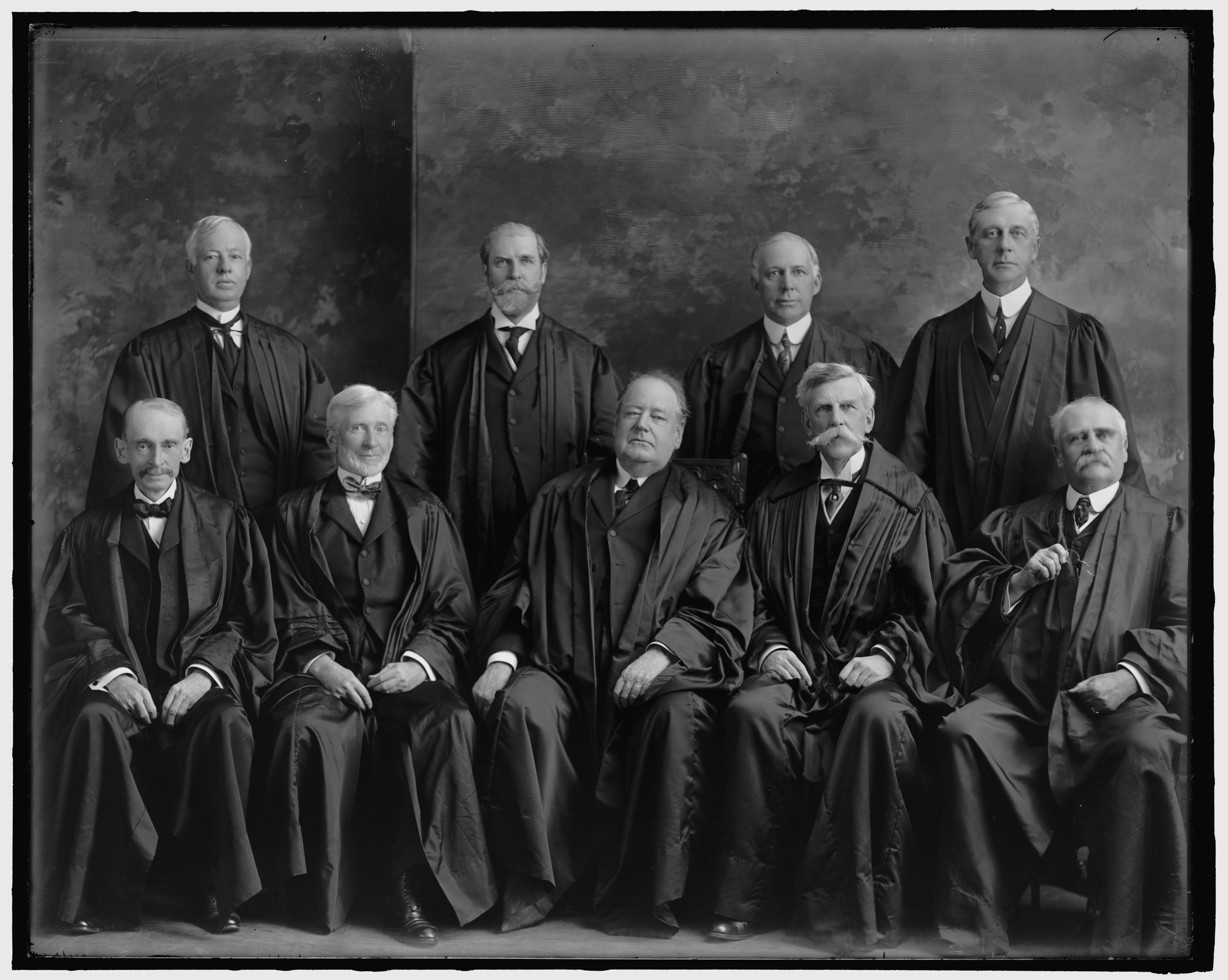
White Court
(March 18, 1912 – July 12, 1914)

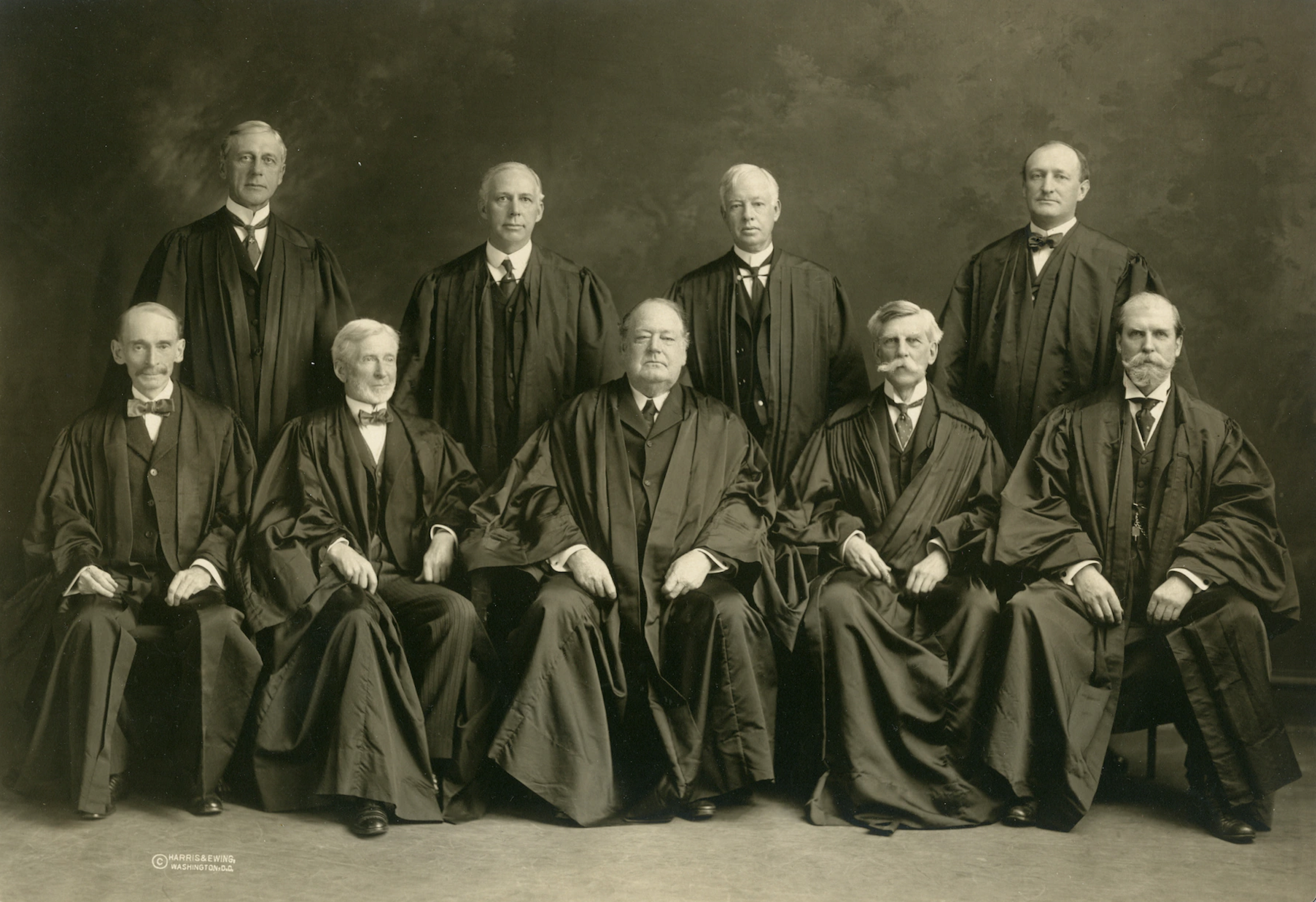
White Court
(October 12, 1914 – January 2, 1916)

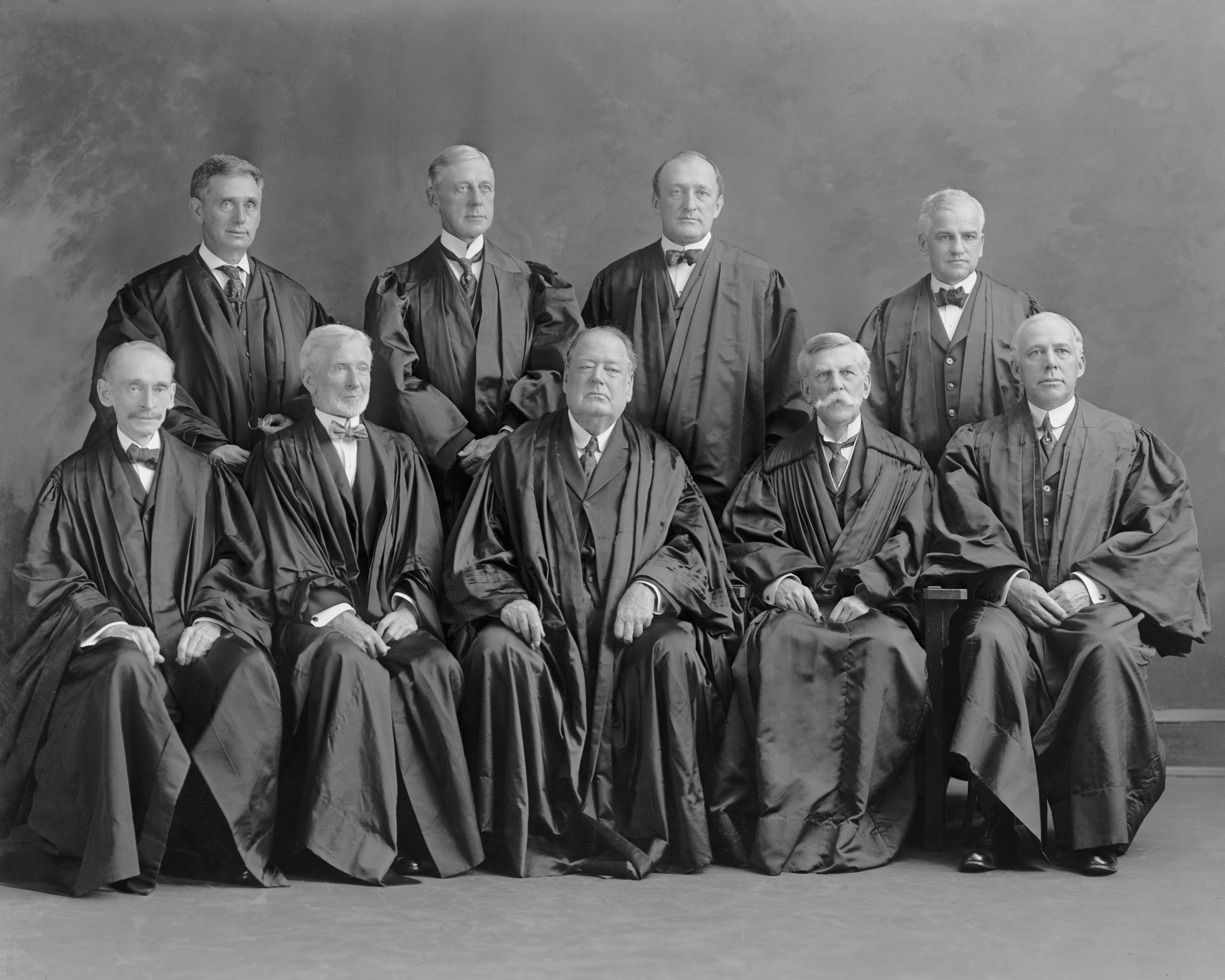
White Court
(October 9, 1916 – May 19, 1921)
