= Imax Corp. v. Cinema Technologies, Inc. =

Ninth Circuit case

- Court: United States Court of Appeals, Ninth Circuit
- Full case name: Imax Corporation v. Cinema Technologies, Inc.; Neil Johnson
- Decided: August 19, 1998
- Citations: Imax Corp. v. Cinema Technologies, Inc., 152 F.3d 1161, 47 U.S.P.Q.2d 1821, 98 Cal. Daily Op. Serv. 6424, 98 Daily Journal D.A.R. 8903, 1998.

Case history
- Appealed from: United States District Court for the Northern District of California, case CV–95–02252–DLJ; Hon. D. Lowell Jensen

Holding
- Affirmed district court's judgment against IMAX regarding misappropriation of trade secrets claim; IMAX failed to identify the precise numerical dimensions and tolerances of its projector, which it claimed as trade secrets, with sufficient particularity. Reversed and remanded district court's ruling on unfair competition claim; fact issues precluded summary judgment.

Case opinions
- Decision by: Sneed, C.J.

Keywords
- Intellectual property; Trade secret

Imax Corp. v. Cinema Technologies, Inc. was a legal proceeding in the United States of America notable for holding that the plaintiff could only identify claimed trade secrets with sufficient specificity if it identified the precise numerical dimensions and tolerances of the projector.

The case began after IMAX’s competitor allegedly misappropriated trade secrets with its “rolling loop” film projector. The matter was heard by a district court judge who ruled in the defendants' favor; that ruling was then appealed by IMAX.

The appellate court ruled that IMAX failed to carry its burden of identifying the trade secrets because it did not identify the precise numerical dimensions and tolerances it claimed as trade secrets.

== Case facts ==
IMAX Corporation filed the case in August 1994 against Cinema Technologies, Inc. (CTI) and mechanical engineer Neil A. Johnson, CTI’s founder, in the United States District Court for the Northern District of California, alleging the defendants misappropriated trade secrets and engaged in unfair competition. IMAX initially included NJ Engineering in the lawsuit, but it later dismissed them without prejudice.

IMAX developed, patented, and sold large format motion picture projectors, or "rolling loop" projectors. The United States Patent and Trademark Office first issued patents related to the "rolling loop" projector in 1971, and IMAX acquired the rights to several of these patents. IMAX included a confidentiality provision in its sales and lease agreements to maintain the secrecy of the technology not disclosed in its patents. Neil Johnson formed NJ Engineering along with David Mariani and Keith Merrill, intending to develop a competing large format projector.

Johnson observed the operation of an IMAX projector at a California museum for several hours, and Mariani and Merrill gave him copies of several IMAX patents and a service manual obtained from an IMAX customer that was not marked confidential. After several of these patents expired, Johnson and his team spent two weeks at the Great America theme park disassembling, measuring, tracing, sketching, and photographing parts of an IMAX projector. Later, Johnson spent two days in Buenos Aires, Argentina, inspecting another partially disassembled IMAX projector that Mariani wanted to buy, reverse engineer, and subsequently resell.

Johnson left NJ Engineering and formed Cinema Technologies, Inc., which began marketing its own “rolling loop” projector. CTI allegedly developed its projector using only information in the public domain.

== Lower court history ==
On August 31, 1994, IMAX sued CTI and Johnson for alleged misappropriation of trade secrets and unfair competition under California law. CTI moved for summary judgment, alleging that IMAX: "(1) failed to identify any trade secrets; (2) placed all of its alleged trade secrets in the public domain; (3) failed to make reasonable efforts to maintain the confidentiality of its alleged trade secrets; and (4) failed to demonstrate any misappropriation" by CTI. IMAX filed a countermotion requesting partial adjudication that twenty-four of its alleged trade secrets were not in the public domain.

The court granted CTI summary judgment on both the misappropriation and unfair competition claims. The court reasoned that IMAX’s failure to identify the precise numerical dimensions and tolerances it claimed as trade secrets was insufficient to meet its burden of identifying its trade secrets.

== Appellate case ==
The Ninth Circuit granted summary judgment to CTI on the misappropriation of trade secrets claim. They reversed the lower court’s judgment on the unfair competition claim and remanded the case back to the lower court for further proceedings. The court held that IMAX submitted evidence that its customers are bound by a confidentiality agreement in support of the unfair competition claim, thus raising genuine issues as to whether CTI acquired the trade secrets by improper means.

== Aftermath ==
The case was not appealed and remains at the forefront of cases involving sufficient particularity in trade secrets cases. In the case of Altavion Inc. v. Konika Minolta Systems Laboratory, Inc. (Cal. Ct. App. 2014), the Court declined to extend Imax’s scope. The Court noted a flexibility of the standard of required specificity. The degree required depends on the nature of the case.
