= Robert D. Sack =

American judge (born 1939)

Robert Sack
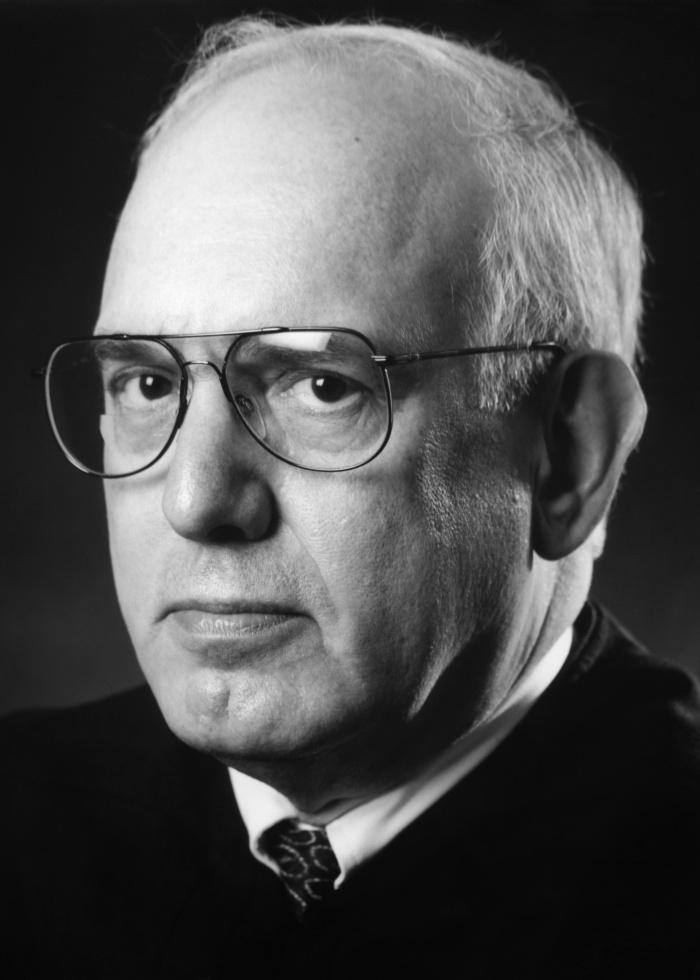

Senior Judge of the United States Court of Appeals for the Second Circuit
- Incumbent
- Assumed office August 6, 2009

Judge of the United States Court of Appeals for the Second Circuit
- In office June 16, 1998 – August 6, 2009
- Appointed by: Bill Clinton
- Preceded by: Roger Miner
- Succeeded by: Denny Chin

Personal details
- Born: Robert David Sack; 1939 (age 86–87) Philadelphia, Pennsylvania, U.S.
- Education: University of Rochester (BA); Columbia University (LLB)

Robert David Sack (born 1939) is a senior United States circuit judge of the United States Court of Appeals for the Second Circuit.

== Early life and education ==
Born to Eugene and Sylvia Sack in Philadelphia, Pennsylvania, Sack was later raised in Brooklyn, New York. His father was a rabbi at reform Congregation Beth Elohim in Brooklyn, New York, for 35 years.

Sack received a Bachelor of Arts degree from the University of Rochester in 1960 and received his Bachelor of Laws from Columbia Law School in 1963.

== Legal career ==
In his first year following graduation from Columbia, he clerked for Judge Arthur Stephen Lane of the United States District Court for the District of New Jersey. The following year, in 1964, he joined Patterson, Belknap & Webb, becoming a partner of the firm in 1970. In 1974, he was Associate Special Counsel and then Senior Associate Special Counsel for the House Judiciary Committee's impeachment inquiry into President Richard Nixon. Following his government service, Sack returned to Patterson Belknap. In 1986, he joined the law firm of Gibson, Dunn & Crutcher as a partner until his appointment as a circuit judge in 1998. Throughout his 33-year career in private practice, Sack specialized in national and international press law, representing numerous United States and foreign-based media companies.

== Federal judicial service ==
Sack was nominated by President Bill Clinton on November 6, 1997, to a seat on the United States Court of Appeals for the Second Circuit vacated by Judge Roger J. Miner. He was confirmed by the United States Senate on June 15, 1998, and received his commission on June 16, 1998. He assumed senior status on August 6, 2009. While a judge, he authored over 300 opinions and dozens of concurrences and dissents.

== Notable opinions ==
Doe v. Trump Corporation, 6 F.4th 400 (2d Cir. 2021): Sack, writing for the panel, held that defendants Trump Corporation, Donald J. Trump, and members of his family were not entitled to have the district court enforce an arbitration agreement in a suit for unfair business practices and deceptive statements regarding a multi-level marketing company.

In re Arab Bank, PLC Alien Tort Statute Litigation, 808 F.3d 144 (2d Cir. 2015): Sack, writing for the panel, held that the Alien Tort Statute did not confer original jurisdiction over claims of terrorism victims against bank that allegedly financed and facilitated organizations who committed attacks in Israel, the West Bank, and the Gaza Strip.

Barclays Capital, Inc. v. Theflyonthewall.com, 650 F.3d 876 (2d Cir. 2011): Sack, writing for the panel, concluded that the tort of hot news misappropriation was preempted by the Copyright Act as applied to the facts of the instant case, which concerned a novel lawsuit by various investment banks, which publish and disseminate equity research reports, against a small Internet-based aggregator of stock tips which sold the investment banks' recommendations to its own clients.

Arar v. Ashcroft, 585 F.3d 559 (2d Cir. 2009): Sack, dissenting in part from the majority opinion en banc, wrote that a Bivens remedy should have been available to a dual Canadian-Syrian citizen who was detained by federal officials at John F. Kennedy airport, repeatedly denied access to a lawyer, and subsequently removed to Syria to be interrogated under torture by Syrian authorities for ten months.

Blanch v. Koons, 467 F.3d 244 (2d Cir. 2006): Sack, writing for the panel, affirmed the district court's decision that artist Jeff Koons was protected by the doctrine of fair use, and therefore not liable for copyright infringement, when he incorporated a photographer's copyrighted photo of a woman's feet and lower legs into a larger collage painting, even though Koons had benefited commercially from the work.

== Other writings, activities, and awards ==
Sack has written and lectured on the subjects of national and international press law. In 1980, he published his book entitled Sack On Defamation: Libel, Slander, and Related Problems, now in its 5th edition (2017), which provides guidance and insight into defamation claims and more broadly, communications law. He is coauthor with the late P. Cameron DeVore of the first edition of Advertising and Commercial Speech: A First Amendment Guide (1999). His article, "Protection of Opinion Under the First Amendment: Reflections on Alfred Hill," Defamation and Privacy Under the First Amendment, was published in the 100th Anniversary issue of the Columbia Law Review; and "New York Times Co. v. Sullivan, 50-Year Afterward," 66 Alabama L. Rev. 273 (2014), on the 50th Anniversary of Sullivan.

Sack has also specialized in First Amendment law, offering courses as an adjunct professor from 2001 to 2023 at Columbia Law School. He was Columbia Law School's commencement speaker in 2007. He was Adjunct Professor of Political Science and Special Guest Lecturer at the University of Rochester in 2012 and a Distinguished Visiting Jurist at the University of Chicago Law School in 2013.

Sack was an officer and director of the William F. Kerby and Robert S. Potter Fund, which assisted in funding the legal defense of journalists abroad, and a member of the advisory boards of the Bureau of National Affairs' Media Law Reporter and the ABA Forum Committee's Communications Lawyer. He is a member of the Board of Visitors of Columbia Law School, and he was a member of the Board of Trustees of Columbia University Seminars on Media and Society. Sack was an Adviser to American Law Institute's Restatement Third of Torts, Defamation and Privacy, 2019-, and an Adviser to Global Media Freedom Initiative's High-Level Panel of Legal Experts convened at the request of the UK and Canadian government, 2019-20. He is a member of the American Bar Association, the New York City Bar Association (Chair, Communications Law Committee, 1986-89), and the American Judicature Society. Sack is a Fellow of the American Bar Foundation.

In May 2008, Sack was awarded the Learned Hand Medal for excellence in federal jurisprudence by the Federal Bar Council.

== Personal life ==
In 1989, Sack married lawyer Anne K. Hilker. Sack has three children from a previous marriage.

Legal offices
Preceded by Roger Miner	Judge of the United States Court of Appeals for the Second Circuit; 1998–2009	Succeeded by Denny Chin
