= Anti-plug molding law =

Law that prohibits coping original products

An anti-plug molding law is a statute, usually a state law, that prohibits the use of an original product, such as a boat hull, as a "plug" for making a mold to use to make copies of the original product. The plug is the core around which the walls of the mold are formed and the contours of which the mold replicates in reverse.

== Technology ==
The Federal Circuit described plug molding technology in these terms, in its decision in the Interpart case, discussed below:

The California plug molding statute ... proscribes use of the product itself for a pattern or "plug" in a direct molding process. In that process, the product is entirely coated with a mold-forming substance that sets and which is then removed from the product and used as the mold for making numerous replicas of the product. This process is substantially less expensive than developing a mold from scratch, something the original product manufacturer has to do.

== Legal challenges ==
=== Interpart case ===
Plug molding statutes have been challenged as interfering with the federal patent system and therefore preempted by federal law. In 1985 in Interpart Corp. v. Italia, the Federal Circuit upheld the California anti-plug molding law against a preemption challenge, when it was invoked to stop copying of an automobile rear view mirror. The court said that the law "prevents unscrupulous competitors from obtaining a product and using it as the 'plug' for making a mold." The Federal Circuit insisted that there is no "right to copy." It therefore concluded:

The California law does not "clash" with the federal patent law; the two laws have different objectives. ... [W]e see nothing in the federal patent statutes that conflicts with California's desire to prevent a particular type of competition which it considers unfair.

=== Bonito Boats case ===
Subsequently, in Bonito Boats, Inc. v. Thunder Craft Boats, Inc., in 1989 the United States Supreme Court held the Florida anti-plug molding law preempted because it partially duplicated and therefore interfered with federal patent law. The decision reaffirmed the Supreme Court's earlier decision in Sears, Roebuck & Co. v. Stiffel Co., which held a state unfair competition law preempted on the same ground. The Supreme Court commented adversely on the Interpart decision. First, the Court brushed aside the Federal Circuit's characterization of the law as one preventing "unscrupulous" behavior:

Appending the conclusionary label "unscrupulous" to such competitive behavior [i.e., copying] merely endorses a policy judgment which the patent laws do not leave the States free to make. Where an item in general circulation is unprotected by patent, reproduction of a functional attribute is legitimate competitive activity.

The Court then turned to the Federal Circuit's rejection of a "right to copy":

For almost 100 years, it has been well established that, in the case of an expired patent, the federal patent laws do create a federal right to "copy and to use." Sears and Compco extended that rule to potentially patentable ideas which are fully exposed to the public. ... By offering patent-like protection for ideas deemed unprotected under the present federal scheme, the Florida statute conflicts with the "strong federal policy favoring free competition in ideas which do not merit patent protection.
