= Barclays Capital Inc. v. Theflyonthewall.com, Inc. =

American legal case

- Court: United States Court of Appeals for the Second Circuit
- Full case name: Barclays Capital Inc., Merrill Lynch, Pierce, Fenner & Smith Inc., and Morgan Stanley & Co. Inc. v. Theflyonthewall.com, Inc.
- Argued: August 6, 2010
- Decided: June 20, 2011
- Citation: 650 F.3d 876

Case history
- Prior history: 700 F. Supp. 2d 310 (S.D.N.Y. 2010)

Court membership
- Judges sitting: Rosemary S. Pooler, Reena Raggi, Robert D. Sack

Case opinions
- Majority: Sack
- Concurrence: Raggi

Laws applied
- Copyright Act

Keywords
- Hot News; Misappropriation; Intellectual Property; Unfair Competition

Barclays Capital Inc. v. Theflyonthewall.com, Inc., 650 F.3d 876 (2d Cir. 2011), was a case decided in the United States Court of Appeals for the Second Circuit where the Second Circuit, reversing the decision of the US District Court below it, found that the claims of three major financial investment firms (Barclays Investment Bank, Morgan Stanley, and Merrill Lynch) against an internet subscription stock news service (theflyonthewall.com) for "Hot-news" Misappropriation under state common law doctrine could not stand, as they were pre-empted by several sections of the Federal Copyright Act (17 U.S.C. § 106, 17 U.S.C. § 102, and 17 U.S.C. § 103).

The case was significant because the Second Circuit redefined elements of the "Hot-news" Misappropriation tort, breaking with earlier Second Circuit precedent by holding that such precedent was not binding, but merely obiter dicta. According to some legal commentators, the decision would have the effect of making it more difficult for future plaintiffs to bring claims under the hot-news misappropriation doctrine, at least in the Second Circuit.

== Story of the case ==
The defendant, Theflyonthewall.com, Inc., was a company that was in the business of obtaining, by various means, daily stock recommendations prepared by the plaintiffs, Lehman Brothers (later purchased by Barclays Investment Bank), Morgan Stanley, and Merrill Lynch, in their highly sought-after research reports. The defendant sold a service wherein subscribers could receive these recommendations prior to their release by the plaintiffs to the general public. The plaintiffs claimed that the value of the reports to their own clients was predicated on the reports' exclusivity, accuracy, and timely release (they were often only valuable during the few hours before the stock market would open) and whose value to the firms in turn was predicated on their potential to attract and retain clients, to entice clients to execute stock trades through them, and to differentiate themselves from other financial services firms and for generating revenue by way of commissions earned from facilitating trades on behalf of those clients.

On June 26, 2006, the plaintiffs filed a lawsuit seeking an injunction against Theflyonthewall.com ordering them to cease distributing portions of the exclusive research reports as well as the recommendations within them. The plaintiffs sought to base their request for injunctive relief on two sets of legal claims: 1) claims that the defendant had violated their copyright in the research reports by verbatim copying and dissemination of portions of the reports and; 2) claims that the defendant had committed the common-law tort of "hot-news" misappropriation by publishing the recommendations within the reports.

In the procedural lead-up to the trial, the defendants essentially conceded their liability under the copyright claim. Thus, at a bench trial before the District Court for the Southern District of New York, the remaining issues to be tried were the appropriate relief for the copyright claim, as well as liability and relief for the hot-news misappropriation claim. On March 18, 2010, the District Court found in favour of the plaintiffs, issuing an injunction ordering the defendants to cease their publication of the plaintiffs' reports and recommendations (see summary of the court's decision below.)

Shortly thereafter, the defendants appealed the decision to the US Court of Appeals for the Second Circuit. The defendants abandoned their defence against the copyright claims and focused solely on the hot-news misappropriation findings. They argued that the District Court had erred in finding that the hot-news misappropriation claim had been established, that the claim (made under state law) was pre-empted and therefore barred by federal copyright legislation, and that the resulting injunction was improperly granted, was overbroad, and violated the defendant's free speech rights under the First Amendment.

On June 20, 2011, the Second Circuit released its decision - reversing the decision of the District Court below, and instructing it to dismiss the claim. A summary of the Second Circuit's decision can also be found below.

== Opinion of the District Court ==
=== Hot-news misappropriation ===
Hot-news misappropriation as a cause of action originated from International News Service v. Associated Press wherein the Supreme Court held that hot news, defined as time-sensitive information, is protectable as "quasi-property." This misappropriation doctrine was developed further with the aim to "protect costly efforts to gather commercially valuable, time-sensitive information that would otherwise be unprotected by law." Significantly, the 'hot' news doctrine is concerned with "the copying and publication of information gathered by another before he has been able to utilize his competitive edge." Given that the Copyright Act of 1976 deals specifically with copyright misappropriation for original works, different judges' holdings questioned the tort of hot-news misappropriation as a cause of action. These discussions included copyright protection as only belonging to the realm of originality and not effort as well as holdings that the creative organization of information was copyrightable but not the information itself. Seventy-nine years later, National Basketball Association v. Motorola, Inc. ("NBA"), provided answers to the questions that preceded it and also provided a five-element test for determining hot-news misappropriation.

==== Test for determining hot-news misappropriation ====
In Barclays Capital Inc. v. Theflyonthewall.com, Inc., the court used the five-element test set out in NBA, which was cited in the District Court's opinion as follows:

1) A plaintiff generates or gathers information at a cost;
2) The information is time-sensitive;
3) A defendant's use of the information constitutes free riding on the plaintiff's efforts;
4) The defendant is in direct competition with a product or service offered by the plaintiffs;
5) The ability of other parties to free-ride on the efforts of the plaintiff or others would so reduce the incentive to produce the product or service that its existence or quality would be substantially threatened.

==== District Court ruling on firms' hot-news misappropriation claim ====
===== Element 1 =====
The plaintiffs satisfied the first element of the hot-news misappropriation test because the plaintiffs spent "hundreds of millions of dollars" annually towards the production of equity research reports, including the employment of highly skilled analysts. The defendant did not dispute that the plaintiffs engaged in costly information gathering.

===== Element 2 =====
The plaintiffs' reports and recommendations were held to be "clearly time-sensitive" by virtue of the fact that the plaintiffs' clients used the information for their actions in anticipation of stock price movement. Moreover, the time-sensitivity was especially important as the plaintiffs expended resources to be the first to communicate these findings to the client and generate commissions revenue. The defendant did not dispute that the plaintiffs' reports and recommendations were time-sensitive.

===== Element 3 =====
For the third element concerning free-riding, the court found that the defendant's "core business [was] its free-riding off the sustained, costly efforts by the Firms and other investment institutions to generate equity research that is highly valued by investors." The court defined free-riding as where there is very little investment by the defendant to profit off of "information generated or collected by the plaintiff at great cost." Whereas the defendant did not on its own generate original research for the "Recommendations" it published, and its ability to profit off of the reproductions of the Recommendations relied on both the plaintiffs reputations as well as the plaintiffs' expenditure of resources toward generating expert analysis, the court found that defendant free-rode off of the plaintiffs' work.

===== Element 4 =====
The court found that the parties were in direct competition in that both were attempting to provide time-sensitive information to clientele, and the defendant's dissemination of that information prior to the plaintiffs being able to satisfy the demand for pre-market hours stock movement reports and trade recommendations. In doing so, the plaintiffs' clientele, already identified as more likely to trade through the source from which they ascertained the news, were less likely to do their trading through the plaintiffs. Additionally, the court noted that the defendant and the plaintiffs both used similar channels of information distribution including access-controlled media, license third-party distributors to disseminate their information to entitled recipients.

===== Element 5 =====
The court found that this element required the demonstration that the defendant's conduct, and others like the defendant, if allowed to continue, would be "likely substantially to threaten plaintiffs' ability to continue to participate in the market." The court noted that the plaintiffs relied on being the first to report their reports and recommendations to their clients. As such, if other organizations were to preempt the plaintiffs, the knowledge that the plaintiffs had spent money to gather and analyze would be rendered basic. Thus, the court argued that if the defendant, and others like it, were allowed to continue copying and disseminating the research reports of the plaintiffs, they would lose their commission revenue, and not be able to offset the cost of producing the research, and discontinue their research production.

=== District Court ruling on firms' copyright claim and resulting remedy ===
The court found that the defendant had infringed the copyrights of two of the plaintiffs - Morgan Stanley and Barclays Capital. To satisfy these requirements, Morgan Stanley provided eight research reports and Barclays Capital provided nine research reports (a total of seventeen research reports), their associated registration certificates, and seventeen corresponding examples of the defendant's "direct, verbatim copying of key excerpts." While throughout the pre-trial process, Fly defended its copying of the reports as fair use under 17 U.S.C. § 107, at trial, the defendant did not dispute that it infringed the copyrights in these seventeen reports. As such, the court ruled in favor of these two plaintiffs and ordered the defendant to pay them nominal damages, pre-judgment interest on the statutory damage awards, and attorney's fees. The court further ordered a permanent injunction such that the defendant was disallowed from further infringement of "any portion of the copyrighted elements of any research reports" generated by those two plaintiffs.

== Opinion of the Second Circuit Court of Appeals ==
The defendant appealed the rulings of the District Court on hot-news misappropriation to the Court of Appeals for the Second Circuit. On appeal, the Second Circuit court reversed the decision below and ruled in favor of the defendant, finding that the plaintiffs' hot-news misappropriation claim was "preempted by federal copyright law."

=== Federal preemption ===
The Court recalled that in order to determine whether a state-law claim is preempted by the federal Copyright Act, 17 U.S.C. § 301 sets forth a two part test:

- The General Scope Requirement: if the impugned state-law claim "seeks to vindicate 'legal or equitable rights that are equivalent' to one of the bundle of exclusive rights already protected by copyright law under 17 U.S.C. § 106";

and

- The Subject Matter Requirement: "if the work in question is of the type of works protected by the Copyright Act under 17 U.S.C. § 102 and 17 U.S.C. § 103."

The Second Circuit found that the plaintiffs recommendations satisfied the "subject matter" requirement as well as the "general scope" requirement of the Copyright Act. They held that the hot-news misappropriation exemption from pre-emption carved out in the NBA case was explicitly intended to be narrow in scope. In addition, they characterized the 5-part test that was set out in NBA and applied by the District Court as obiter dictum.

Judge Raggi, in a separate concurring opinion, disagreed with the majority that the NBA test was dictum, and would have held that although pre-emption occurred; the 5-part test was valid, but had been misapplied in the Court below.

== Organizations concerned about the Second Circuit's ruling ==
The case was followed widely and several prominent organizations filed amicus curiae briefs as intervenors.

The Electronic Frontier Foundation, Citizen Media Law Project, and Public Citizen, Inc. filed an amicus curiae brief urging the Second Circuit court to take into consideration the First Amendment as it related to the district court judgement's potential restraints on Americans' abilities to gather and comment on the news of the day.

Google and Twitter filed an amicus brief calling for the repudiation of the hot-news misappropriation tort. The Second Circuit held that this was beyond the bounds of the court's power and not relevant to the case.

The Newspaper Association of America, The New York Times Company, Philadelphia Media Holdings, Stephens Media, Time, and The Washington Post'' filed an amicus brief.

The Securities Industry and Financial Markets Association, Dow Jones & Company, and The Investorside Research Association each filed amicus briefs.

== Second Circuit's humorous footnotes ==
=== Irony ===
In recounting the story of the case, the Second Circuit Court wrote that they "find little to take issue with in the district court's careful findings of facts, to which we must in any event defer. We therefore borrow freely from them." These sentences are followed by a footnote which reads, "The irony of doing so in the context of a copyright-infringement and 'hot news'-misappropriation case is not lost on us."" (Footnote 3).

=== Biblical references ===
The Second Circuit court comments on the INS v. AP court's characterization of INS's behavior as having a "biblical" tone," where the INS v. AP court asserts that INS had "reaped where it ha[d] not sown." This claim is then footnoted by the Second Circuit to include an analysis of this phrase as it appears in the Bible: "In the Bible, that turn of phrase seems to be more a threat than a promise. See, e.g., Galatians 6:7: "God is not mocked, for whatever a man sows, that he will also reap." But cf. Leviticus 23:22, setting forth circumstances under which persons are forbidden to reap where they have sown."
