= National Basketball Ass'n v. Motorola, Inc. =

1997 American legal case

National Basketball Assoc. v. Motorola
- Court: United States Court of Appeals for the Second Circuit
- Full case name: The National Basketball Association and NBA Properties, Inc., Plaintiff-Counter-Defendant-Appellee-Cross-Appellant, v. Motorola, Inc., doing business as SportsTrax, Defendant-Counter-Claimant-Appellant-Cross-Appellee, Sports Team Analysis and Tracking Systems, Inc., doing business as Stats, Inc., Defendant-Appellant-Cross-Appellee.
- Decided: Jan 30 1997

Holding
- NBA's claim for misappropriation was dismissed and the Appeals court affirmed the district court's dismissal of the NBA's claim for false advertising.

Court membership
- Judges sitting: Ellsworth Van Graafeiland, Ralph K. Winter, Jr., and Frank Altimari, Circuit Judges

Keywords
- Misappropriation, Hot news

National Basketball Association v. Motorola, 105 F.3d 841 (2d Cir. 1997) is a United States Court of Appeals for the Second Circuit case in which the National Basketball Association (NBA) purported that Motorola and STATS infringed the NBA's copyright on the broadcast of games and misappropriated the data presented on the SportsTrax pager.

== Background ==
Motorola manufactured and marketed the SportsTrax paging device which uses game information supplied by Sports Team Analysis and Tracking Systems ("STATS"). It offers four modes of operation: "current," "statistics," "final scores," and "demonstration." STATS compiled its scores and statistics by employing people to listen or watch the games, then enter the scores on the computer which transmits the scores to STATS' on-line service, to be sent out to anyone using a SportsTrax pager.

In 1996, the National Basketball Association won in a federal Manhattan court the exclusive rights to transmit scores. The NBA claimed that Motorola infringed on the NBA through information misappropriation of the basketball (and baseball) games by arguing that the factual data about the game represents the overall value of the game. The second circuit court of appeals addressed whether the 1976 copyright act preempted the state-law misappropriation claim.

The NBA asserted 6 claims:

1. unfair competition by misappropriation,
2. false advertising under Section 43(a) of the Lanham Act, 15 U.S.C. § 1125(a),
3. false representation of origin under section 43(a) of the Lanham Act,
4. state and common law unfair competition by false advertising and false designation of origin,
5. federal copyright infringement and
6. unlawful interception of communications under the Communications Act of 1934, 47 U.S.C. § 605.

== New York state law misappropriation claim ==
Due to the case involving the International News Service (INS) and the Associated Press (AP) in 1918, New York created a misappropriation law. International News Service v. Associated Press was one of the early cases addressing the issue raised by technological advances, where the International News Service directly lifted factual stories from AP bulletins and wired them to newspapers.

== Opinion of the Court ==
The district court dismissed all of the NBA's claims except the first - misappropriation under New York Law. The court also dismissed the counterclaim by Motorola that the NBA unlawfully interfered with Motorola's contractual sponsorship by four individual NBA teams.

The Second Circuit appellate court struck down the NBA's assertion that the games are copyrighted. "Sports events are not 'authored' in any common sense of the word"(21), arguing that if copyright was open to sporting events, "the inventor of the T-formation in football" would be able to control all uses of the T-formation and could cause problems with the prosperity of the sport.

=== Preemption under the Copyright Act ===
The district court's injunction was based on its conclusions that the defendants had unlawfully misappropriated the NBA's property rights in its games, under New York law. However, the Second Circuit found that "the district court concluded that the NBA's misappropriation claim was not preempted because... the subject matter requirement was not met"(39). The Second Circuit court argued that the copyright act should not be used to distinguish between copyright infringement and state-law misappropriation.

=== Infringement of a copyright in the broadcasts of NBA games ===
The Court noted that the broadcasts of the NBA games, not the games themselves, are entitled to copyright protection. The Copyright Act of 1909 was amended in 1976 specifically to protect the broadcast and meet the requirement that the original work of authorship be "fixed in any tangible medium of expression" 17 U.S.C. § 102(a).

The district court held that Motorola and STATS did not infringe NBA's copyright because only facts from the broadcasts, not the broadcasts themselves were transmitted. The Second Circuit Court agreed with the district court's argument that the "[d]efendants provide purely factual information which any patron of an NBA game could acquire from the arena without any involvement from the director, cameramen, or others who contribute to the originality of the broadcast" [939 F. Supp. at 1094].

=== State law misappropriation claim ===
The New York hot news misappropriation developed out of International News Service v. Associated Press, a 1918 U.S. Supreme Court case. Great Britain prohibited INS reporters because INS's owner, William Randolph Hearst, was an outspoken critic of the allies and an open supporter of the Germans. In order to keep INS newspapers up to date with the latest information from the war, the INS would obtain the factual data from east coast AP news articles, then would send it out to subscribers on the west coast, occasionally beating the AP news stories. In order to deal with this, the Supreme court "crafted a new variant of the common law tort of misappropriation" called the "hot news" doctrine.

New York sought to apply ethical standards to the INS case and created its own body of misappropriation law. However, the Second Circuit Court found that the New York misappropriation law "goes well beyond the 'hot news' claims and is preempted". The court claimed that to survive a "hot news" INS-like claim, several elements were required: the plaintiff generates the information at a cost; the information is time-sensitive; the defendant is free riding off the plaintiff's efforts; and the defendant is in direct competition with a product or service offered by the plaintiffs, and in doing so, enables others to free ride off the efforts of the plaintiffs.

== Reaction ==
The Second Circuit Court dismissed the misappropriation claim and affirmed the district court's dismissal of NBA's claim of false advertising under the Lanham Act.

== See also ==
- Barclays Capital Inc. v. Theflyonthewall.com, Inc.
