= Compco Corp. v. Day-Brite Lighting, Inc. =

- Supreme Court of the United States

Argued January 16, 1964 Decided March 9, 1964
- Full case name: Compco Corp. v. Day-Brite Lighting, Inc.
- Citations: 376 U.S. 234 (more) 84 S. Ct. 779; 11 L. Ed. 2d 669; 1964 U.S. LEXIS 2366; 140 U.S.P.Q. 528

Case history
- Prior: Day-Brite Lighting, Inc. v. Compco Corp., 311 F.2d 26 (7th Cir. 1962); cert. granted, 374 U.S. 825 (1963).
- Subsequent: Rehearing denied, 377 U.S. 913 (1964).

Holding
- State law that effectively duplicates provisions of US patent law is preempted by federal law.

Court membership
- Chief Justice Earl Warren Associate Justices Hugo Black · William O. Douglas; Tom C. Clark · John M. Harlan II; William J. Brennan Jr. · Potter Stewart; Byron White · Arthur Goldberg

Case opinions
- Majority: Black
- Concurrence: Harlan
- This case overturned a previous ruling or rulings
- International News Service v. Associated Press

Compco Corp. v. Day-Brite Lighting, Inc., 376 U.S. 234 (1964), was a United States Supreme Court decision that was a companion case to Sears, Roebuck & Co. v. Stiffel Co. that the Court decided on the same day. Like Sears, Compco held that state law that in effect duplicates the protections of the US patent law is pre-empted by federal law.

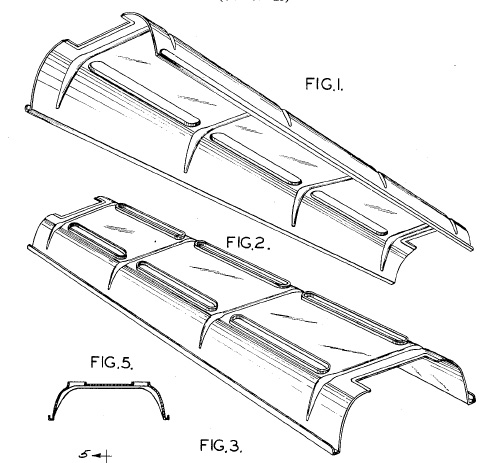
Day-Brite's lighting fixture -- Drawing from Day-Brite's design patent

== Background ==
Day-Brite obtained a design patent on a lighting fixture, a cross-ribbed reflector for fluorescent light tubes. Compco's predecessor copied the fixture and sold it in competition against Day-Brite. Day-Brite then sued for infringement of the design patent and unfair competition under Illinois state law in the United States District Court for the Northern District of Illinois.

The district court held the design patent invalid but ruled in Day-Brite's favor on the unfair competition claim. The court found that the overall appearance of Compco's fixture was "the same, to the eye of the ordinary observer, as the overall appearance" of Day-Brite's fixture, which embodied the design of the invalidated design patent; that the appearance of Day-Brite's design had "the capacity to identify [Day-Brite] in the trade, and does in fact so identify [it] to the trade;" that the concurrent sale of the two products was "likely to cause confusion in the trade;" and that "[a]ctual confusion has occurred." Accordingly, the court ordered Compco to pay damages and enjoined its further sale of the fixture.

The United States Court of Appeals for the Seventh Circuit affirmed the judgment. It found that "several choices of ribbing were apparently available to meet the functional needs of the product," yet Compco "chose precisely the same design used by the plaintiff and followed it so closely as to make confusion likely." The only evidence of confusion was testimony by a Day-Brite employee that a third party plant manager had installed some of Compco's fixtures and later mistakenly asked Day-Brite to service the fixtures by thinking they had been made by Day-Brite. There was evidence that Compco clearly labeled its fixtures and their containers with Compco's name. The Supreme Court characterized the evidence as showing that Compco sold an article that was an exact copy of another unpatented article, and that the conduct was "likely to produce, and did in this case produce, confusion as to the source of the article."

== Ruling ==
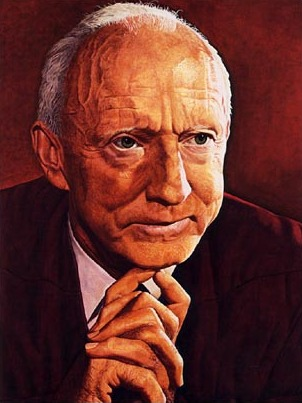
Justice Hugo L. Black

In a unanimous ruling although Justice Harlan separately concurred, the Court reversed and reiterated its holding in the Stiffel case:

[W]hen an article is unprotected by a patent or a copyright, state law may not forbid others to copy that article. To forbid copying would interfere with the federal policy, found in Art. I, § 8, cl. 8, of the Constitution and in the implementing federal statutes, of allowing free access to copy whatever the federal patent and copyright laws leave in the public domain.

The Court held that the "findings" of the court of appeals about confusion, identification of the design with Day-Brite, lack of functionality of the design, and the like were immaterial because the absence of deception on Compco's part:

It is true that the trial court found that the configuration of Day-Brite's fixture identified Day-Brite to the trade because the arrangement of the ribbing had, like a trademark, acquired a "secondary meaning" by which that particular design was associated with Day-Brite. But if the design is not entitled to a design patent or other federal statutory protection, then it can be copied at will.

As we have said in Sears, while the federal patent laws prevent a State from prohibiting the copying and selling of unpatented articles, they do not stand in the way of state law, statutory or decisional, which requires those who make and sell copies to take precautions to identify their products as their own. A State, of course, has power to impose liability upon those who, knowing that the public is relying upon an original manufacturer's reputation for quality and integrity, deceive the public by palming off their copies as the original. That an article copied from an unpatented article could be made in some other way, that the design is "nonfunctional" and not essential to the use of either article, that the configuration of the article copied may have a "secondary meaning" which identifies the maker to the trade, or that there may be "confusion" among purchasers as to which article is which or as to who is the maker, may be relevant evidence in applying a State's law requiring such precautions as labeling; however, and regardless of the copier's motives, neither these facts nor any others can furnish a basis for imposing liability for or prohibiting the actual acts of copying and selling. And, of course, a State cannot hold a copier accountable in damages for failure to label or otherwise to identify his goods unless his failure is in violation of valid state statutory or decisional law requiring the copier to label or take other precautions to prevent confusion of customers as to the source of the goods.

== Subsequent developments ==
Day-Brite is still in the fluorescent lighting fixture business, as a division of Philips.

Thiecase and Sears are widely cited for the proposition that federal patent law pre-empts state law that seeks to provide an alternative protection scheme that duplicates or is inconsistent with the balances that Congress carefully struck between competition and protection in the patent laws. For example, in Bonito Boats, Inc. v. Thunder Craft Boats, Inc., the Court referred to Sears and Compco and noted:

Thus our past decisions have made clear that state regulation of intellectual property must yield to the extent that it clashes with the balance struck by Congress in our patent laws. . . . Where it is clear how the patent laws strike that balance in a particular circumstance, that is not a judgment the States may second-guess.

== See also ==
- List of United States Supreme Court cases, volume 376
