= International News Service v. Associated Press =

- Supreme Court of the United States

Argued May 2–3, 1918 Decided December 23, 1918
- Full case name: International News Service v. Associated Press
- Citations: 248 U.S. 215 (more) 39 S. Ct. 68; 63 L. Ed. 211

Holding
- While the information found in AP news was not copyrightable and subject to publici juris, AP has a quasi-property interest during the production of "hot news".

Court membership
- Chief Justice Edward D. White Associate Justices Joseph McKenna · Oliver W. Holmes Jr. William R. Day · Willis Van Devanter; Mahlon Pitney · James C. McReynolds; Louis Brandeis · John H. Clarke

Case opinions
- Majority: Pitney, joined by White, Day, Van Devanter, McReynolds
- Dissent: Holmes, joined by McKenna
- Dissent: Brandeis
- Clarke took no part in the consideration or decision of the case.

Laws applied
- Common law copyright; publici juris; U.S. Const. art I § 8 clause 8
- Overruled by
- Sears, Roebuck & Co. v. Stiffel Co.; Compco Corp. v. Day-Brite Lighting, Inc.

International News Service v. Associated Press, 248 U.S. 215 (1918), also known as INS v. AP or simply the INS case, is a 1918 decision of the United States Supreme Court that enunciated the misappropriation doctrine of federal intellectual property common law: a "quasi-property right" may be created against others by one's investment of effort and money in an intangible thing, such as information or a design. The doctrine is highly controversial and criticized by many legal scholars, but it has its supporters.

The INS decision recognized the doctrine of U.S. copyright law that there is no copyright in facts, which the Supreme Court later greatly elaborated in the Feist case in 1991, but INS nonetheless extended the prior law of unfair competition to cover an additional type of interference with business expectations: "misappropriation" of the product of "sweat of the brow." The case was decided when a body of federal common law existed for business practices and torts, which the Supreme Court had power to declare or create, but two decades later, the Supreme Court abolished that body of substantive law and held that state law must govern the field henceforth. Accordingly, the INS case no longer has precedential force although state courts are free to follow its reasoning if they so choose.

== Background ==
Two competing United States news services (INS and AP) were in the business of reporting in the U.S. on World War I. Their businesses hinged on getting fast and accurate reports published. After reporting that was perceived by the Allied Powers (Britain and France) as unduly favorable to the Central Powers (Germany and Austria) by William Randolph Hearst's INS, the Allies barred INS from using Allied telegraph lines to report news, which effectively shut down INS's war reporting.

To continue publishing news about the war, INS gained access to AP news by examination of AP news bulletin boards and early editions of newspapers affiliated with AP. INS members would rewrite the news and publish it as their own without attribution to AP. Although INS newspapers had to wait for AP to post news before they went to press, INS newspapers in the West had no such disadvantage relative to their AP counterparts. The AP brought an action seeking to enjoin INS from copying AP-gathered news.

== Ruling ==
=== Power to rule on issues ===
In 1918, the federal courts, particularly the Supreme Court, had the power to declare and create binding law in commercial matters such as bills and notes and torts such as negligence and business interference. This was under the doctrine of Swift v. Tyson, 41 U.S. 1 (1842), which had held that the federal courts, when deciding matters not specifically addressed by the state legislature, had the authority to develop a federal common law. In 1938, in Erie Railroad Co. v. Tompkins, 304 U.S. 64 (1938), the Supreme Court overruled Swift v. Tyson. As Justice Brandeis wrote:

Congress has no power to declare substantive rules of common law applicable in a state whether they be local in their nature or "general," be they commercial law or a part of the law of torts. And no clause in the Constitution purports to confer such a power upon the federal courts.

However, because the INS case had been decided in 1918, the Supreme Court could declare or create applicable tort law to govern the controversy between INS and AP.

=== Previous state of unfair competition law ===
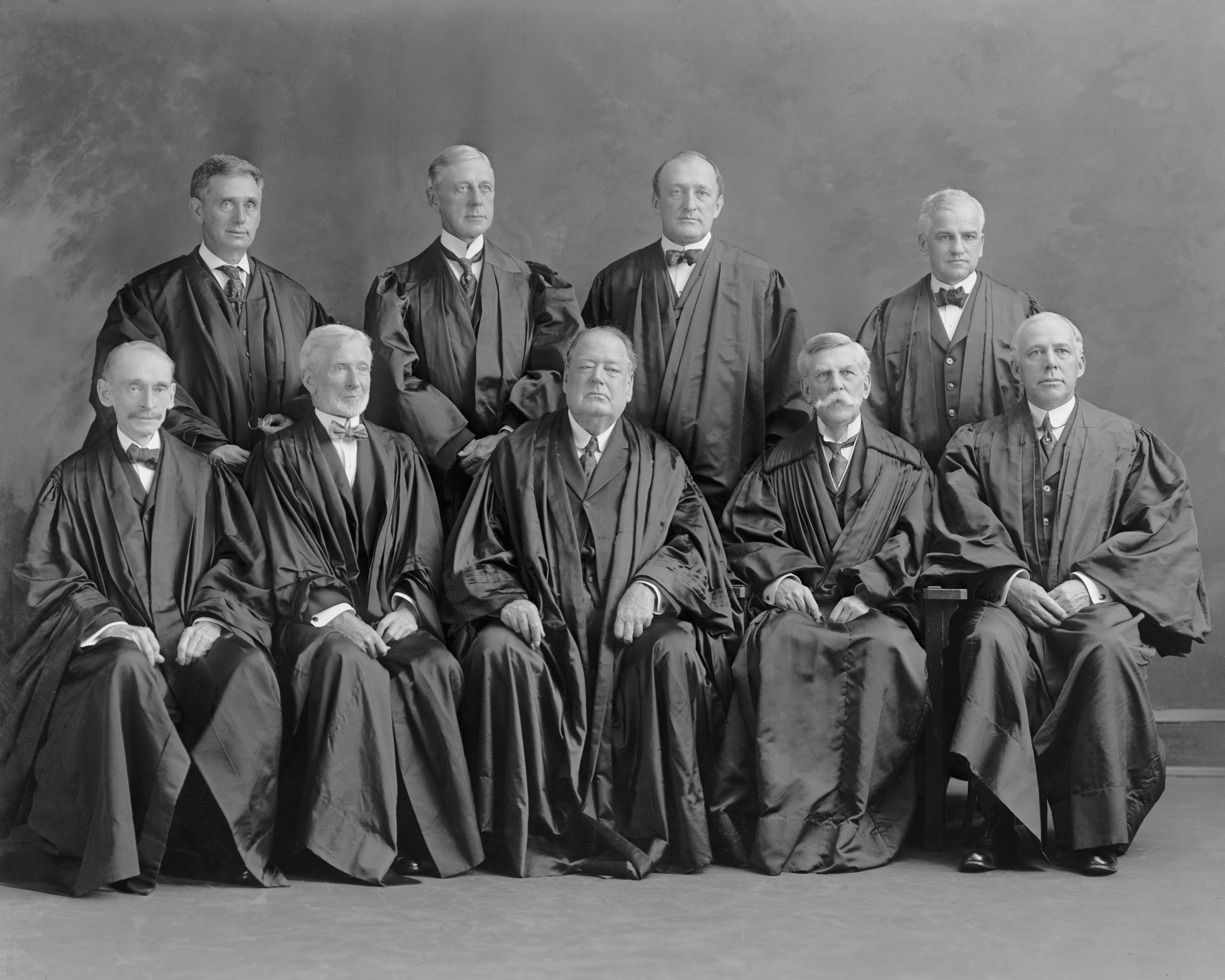
The White Court.

Before the INS case, unfair competition was generally considered to be limited to cases of "palming off" in which the defendant deceived customers by causing them erroneously to believe that the defendant's product emanated from the plaintiff and as a result diverted trade from the plaintiff to the defendant.

=== Majority opinion ===
The Court held in favor of AP, with Justice Pitney writing the majority opinion. Justices Holmes and Brandeis wrote dissenting opinions.

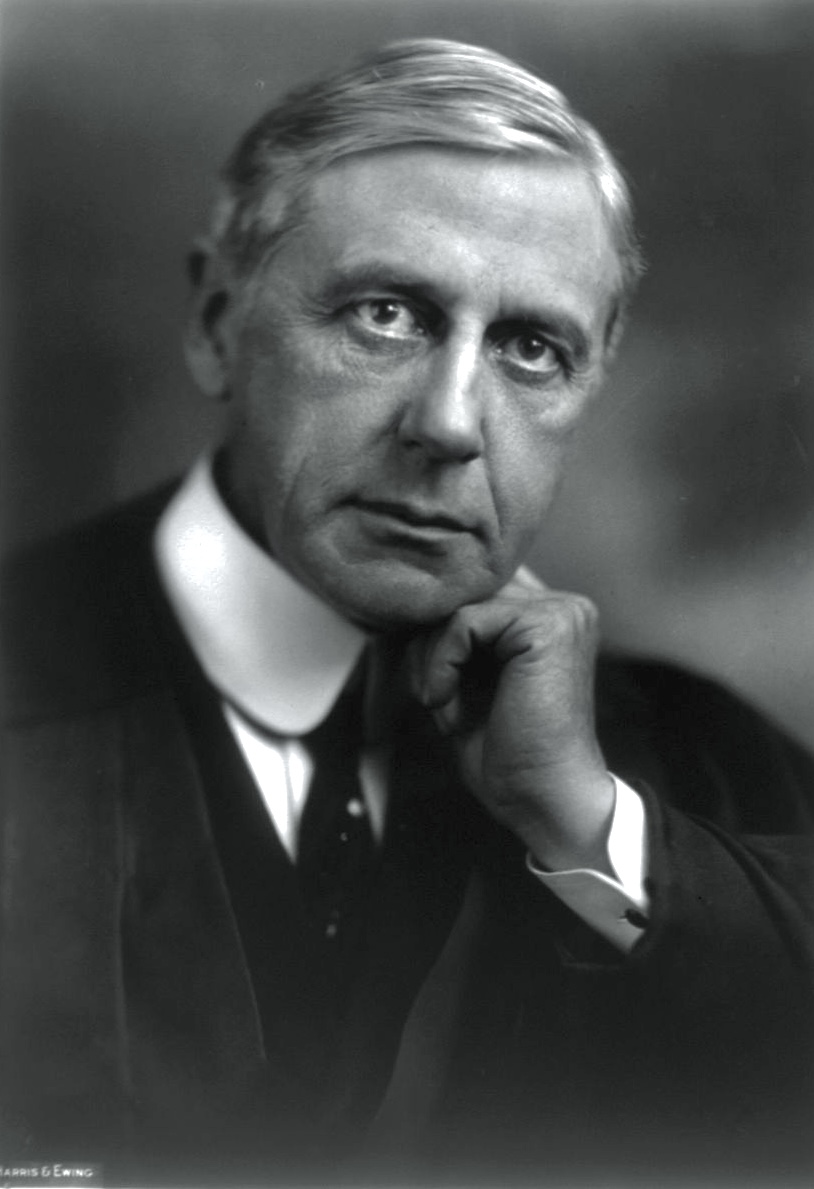
Justice Pitney

The majority opinion recognized that the information found in the AP news was not copyrightable as "the information respecting current events contained in the literary production is not the creation of a writer but is a report of matters that ordinarily are publici juris; it is the history of the day." Instead, Pitney approached the issue from the perspective of unfair competition. He found that there was a quasi-property right in the news as it is "stock in trade to be gathered at the cost of enterprise, organization, skill, labor and money, and to be distributed and sold to those who will pay money for it." Because of the "economic value" of the news, a company can "therefore" have a limited property interest in it against a competitor but not the general public that attempted to take advantage of the information.

The Court characterized INS's behavior as misappropriation. The tenuous value of "hot" news made Pitney narrow the period for which the proprietary right would apply: the doctrine "postpones participation by complainant's competitor in the processes of distribution and reproduction of news that it has not gathered, and only to the extent necessary to prevent that competitor from reaping the fruits of complainant's efforts and expenditure."

The Court justified its creation of a "quasi-property right" in these terms:

[INS] is taking material that has been acquired by AP as the result of organization and the expenditure of labor, skill, and money, and which is salable by AP for money, and that INS in appropriating it and selling it as its own is endeavoring to reap where it has not sown, and by disposing of it to newspapers that are competitors of AP's members is appropriating to itself the harvest of those who have sown.

Stripped of all disguises, the process amounts to an unauthorized interference with the normal operation of AP's legitimate business precisely at the point where the profit is to be reaped, in order to divert a material portion of the profit from those who have earned it to those who have not; with special advantage to INS in the competition because it is not burdened with any part of the expense of gathering the news. The transaction speaks for itself and a court of equity ought not to hesitate long in characterizing it as unfair competition in business.

The underlying principle is much the same as that which lies at the base of the equitable theory of consideration in the law of trusts—that he who has fairly paid the price should have the beneficial use of the property. It is no answer to say that AP spends its money for that which is too fugitive or evanescent to be the subject of property. That might, and for the purposes of the discussion we are assuming that it would furnish an answer in a common-law controversy. But in a court of equity, where the question is one of unfair competition, if that which AP has acquired fairly at substantial cost may be sold fairly at substantial profit, a competitor who is misappropriating it for the purpose of disposing of it to his own profit and to the disadvantage of AP cannot be heard to say that it is too fugitive or evanescent to be regarded as property. It has all the attributes of property necessary for determining that a misappropriation of it by a competitor is unfair competition because contrary to good conscience.

=== Holmes's dissent ===
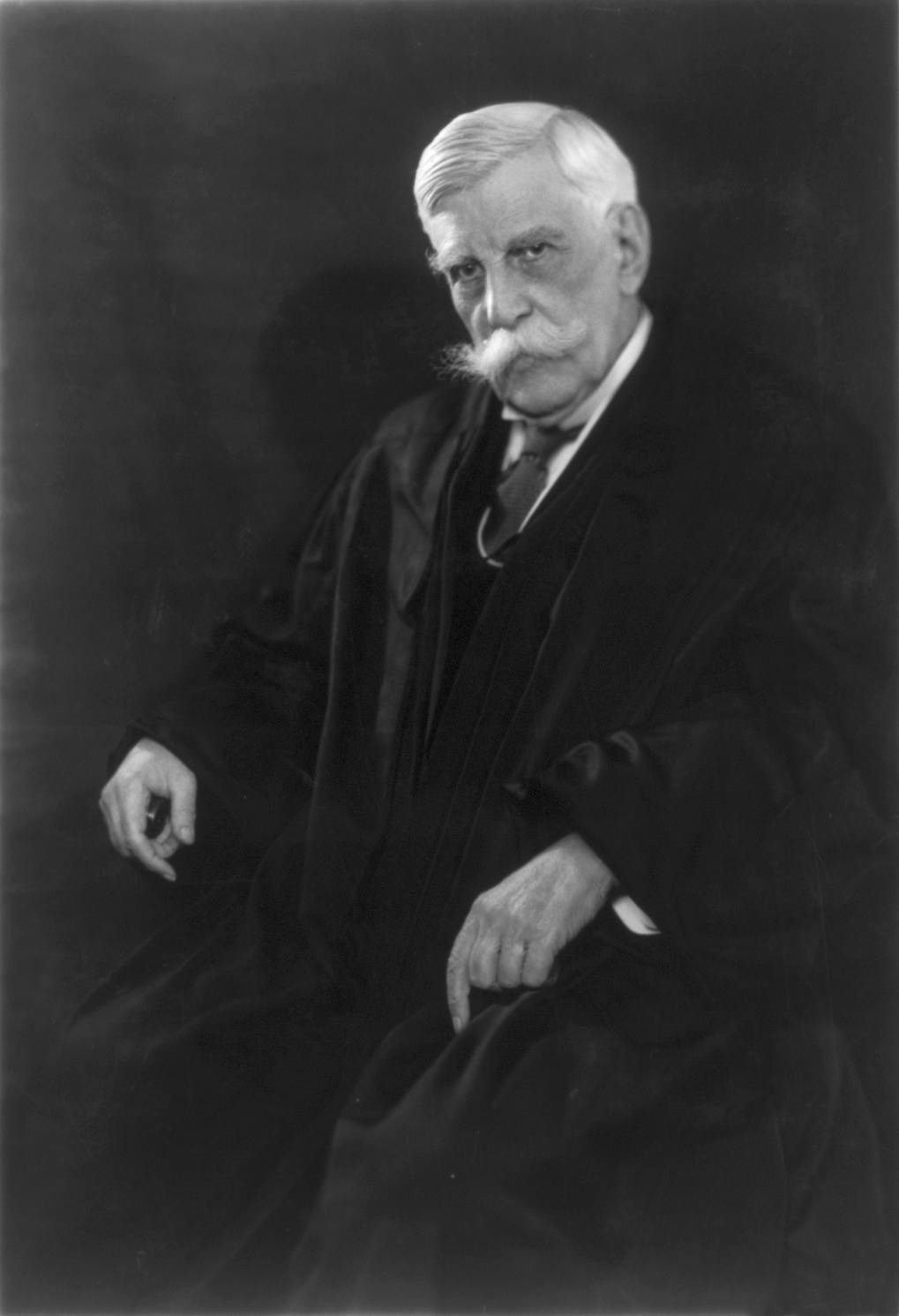
Justice Holmes circa 1930

Justice Holmes began by challenging the Court's concept of property, or "quasi-property," as the majority opinion termed it:

Property, a creation of law, does not arise from value, although exchangeable—a matter of fact. Many exchangeable values may be destroyed intentionally without compensation. Property depends upon exclusion by law from interference, and a person is not excluded from using any combination of words merely because some one has used it before, even if it took labor and genius to make it. If a given person is to be prohibited from making the use of words that his neighbors are free to make some other ground must be found.

Holmes then turned to the law of unfair competition, which the majority claimed was the basis of the ruling. He said that the law of unfair competition requires a misrepresentation. If the misrepresentation was that some people may think AP copied the news from INS, the proper remedy would be only to prohibit INS for a limited time from copying from AP unless it provided a notice that it had copied from AP.

=== Brandeis's dissent ===
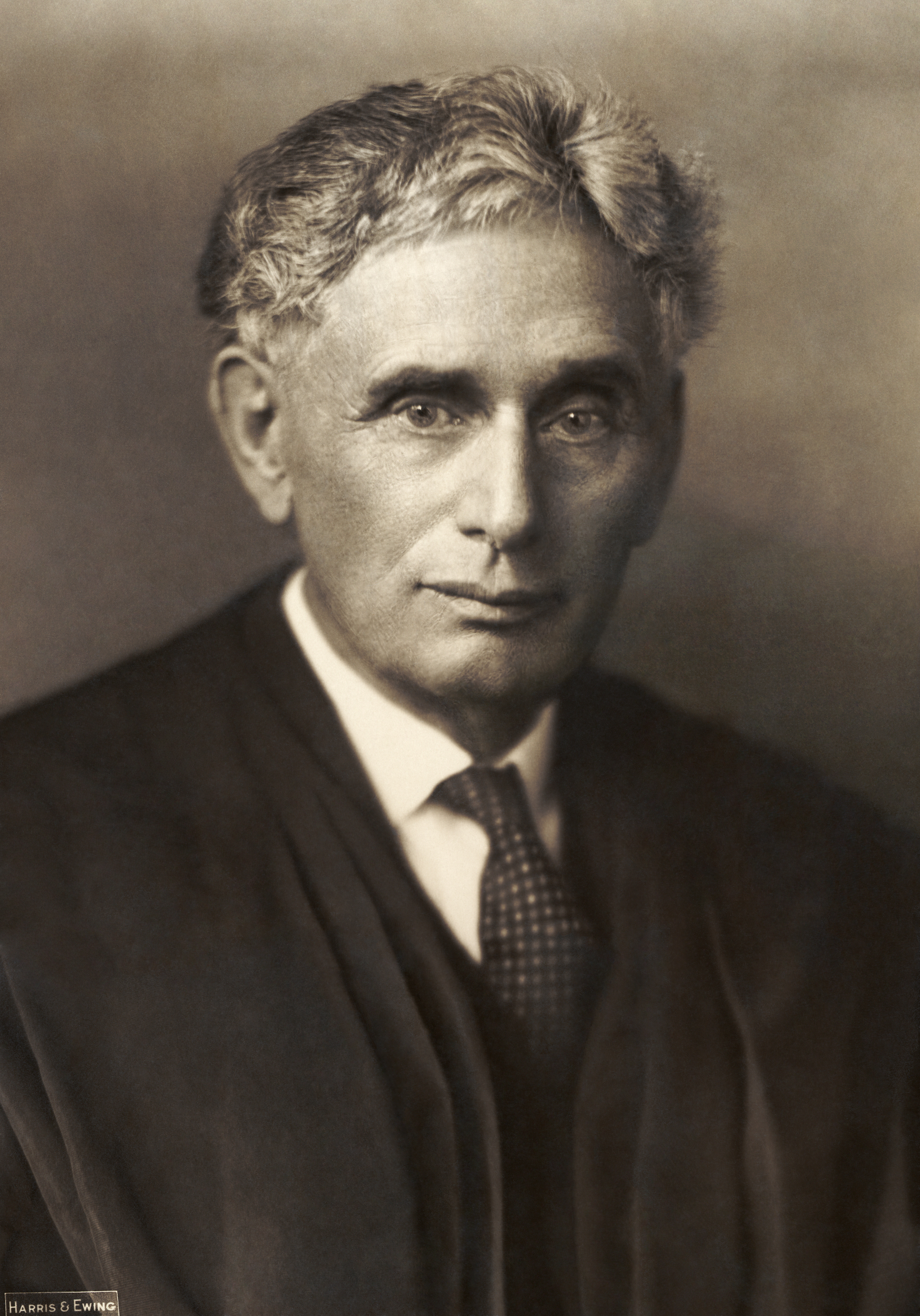
Justice Brandeis

Justice Brandeis objected, first, to the creation of a new property right even if it was called "quasi-property:"

The knowledge for which protection is sought in the case at bar is not of a kind upon which the law has heretofore conferred the attributes of property; nor is the manner of its acquisition or use nor the purpose to which it is applied, such as has heretofore been recognized as entitling a plaintiff to relief."

Next, he denied that "reaping where another sowed" is an actionable tort:

To appropriate and use for profit, knowledge and ideas produced by other men, without making compensation or even acknowledgment, may be inconsistent with a finer sense of propriety; but, with the exceptions indicated above [i.e., misrepresentation, physical or moral coercion, or by inducing breaches of contract], the law has heretofore sanctioned the practice. Thus it was held that one may ordinarily make and sell anything in any form, may copy with exactness that which another has produced, or may otherwise use his ideas without his consent and without the payment of compensation, and yet not inflict a legal injury; and that ordinarily one is at perfect liberty to find out, if he can by lawful means, trade secrets of another, however valuable, and then use the knowledge so acquired gainfully, although it cost the original owner much in effort and in money to collect or produce.

He objected to the majority's saying that "INS cannot be heard to say" such and such "in a court of equity, where the question is one of unfair competition." He said that there was no basis to invoke equity:

The case presents no elements of equitable title or of breach of trust. The only possible reason for resort to a court of equity in a case like this is that the remedy which the law gives is inadequate. If the plaintiff has no legal cause of action, the suit necessarily fails. There is nothing in the situation of the parties which can estop [INS] from saying so.

Brandeis closed his dissent with an argument that the Court was ill-suited to act as a legislature and that the matter should be left to the wisdom of Congress:

The creation or recognition by courts of a new private right may work serious injury to the general public, unless the boundaries of the right are definitely established and wisely guarded. In order to reconcile the new private right with the public interest, it may be necessary to prescribe limitations and rules for its enjoyment; and also to provide administrative machinery for enforcing the rules. . . . A Legislature, urged to enact a law by which one news agency or newspaper may prevent appropriation of the fruits of its labors by another, would consider such facts and possibilities and others which appropriate inquiry might disclose [regarding possible adverse effects on the public and other businesses]. Legislators might conclude that it was impossible to put an end to the obvious injustice involved in such appropriation of news, without opening the door to other evils, greater than that sought to be remedied.

Courts are ill-equipped to make the investigations which should precede a determination of the limitations which should be set upon any property right in news or of the circumstances under which news gathered by a private agency should be deemed affected with a public interest. Courts would be powerless to prescribe the detailed regulations essential to full enjoyment of the rights conferred or to introduce the machinery required for enforcement of such regulations.

Considerations such as these should lead us to decline to establish a new rule of law in the effort to redress a newly disclosed wrong, although the propriety of some remedy appears to be clear.

== Implications and aftermath ==
Although it was a landmark case when it was decided, subsequent developments have diminished its significance. A leading copyright law scholar has commented:

It has been suggested that the credence due the International News Service case today is minimal: that subsequent decisions have restricted its doctrine to the news context and that, in any event, it is but a derelict of the federal common law, untenable after Erie R.R. v. Tompkins.

Seventh Circuit Judge Richard Posner similarly remarked that INS is "a decision no longer authoritative because it was based on the federal courts' subsequently abandoned authority to formulate common law principles in suits arising under state law though litigated in federal court."

=== "Hot news" cases ===
In Twentieth Century Sporting Club, Inc. v. Transradio Press Service, the court found misappropriation when a press service stationed "spotters" on rooftops who watched a boxing match in a nearby stadium. The defendant combined that information with information that was broadcast by plaintiff's exclusive licensee (NBC) to produce a simulated ringside, blow-by-blow broadcast of a boxing match.

The narrowest implication of INS was that there was now a "hot news" doctrine that protected first comers in their creation of an ephemeral time-sensitive information asset at appreciable expense against "free riders." Thus, in National Basketball Association v. Motorola, Inc. (NBA), the Second Circuit held that under New York State law, a "hot-news" INS-like claim exists in "cases where: (i) a plaintiff generates or gathers information at a cost; (ii) the information is time-sensitive; (iii) a defendant's use of the information constitutes free riding on the plaintiff's efforts; (iv) the defendant is in direct competition with a product or service offered by the plaintiffs; and (v) the ability of other parties to free-ride on the efforts of the plaintiff or others would so reduce the incentive to produce the product or service that its existence or quality would be substantially threatened."

However, after the passage of the 1976 Copyright Act, the "hot news" doctrine began to suffer reverses. The Second Circuit held that the "hot news" tort had been largely pre-empted by the 1976 Act in the NBA case.

=== Other copying cases ===
Prior to 1972, federal copyright law did not extend to sound recordings. During this period, several states acted against "record piracy" (the copying of phonograph records or tape recordings) under the INS doctrine. In Goldstein v. California, the Supreme Court held that the California penal statute against the unlicensed copying of records was not preempted by federal copyright law since Congress had not regulated the subject matter.

In John Roberts Mfg. Co. v. University of Notre Dame du Lac, an unlicensed manufacturer distributed class rings in competition with the "official" product sponsored by the university. Since in making his rings, the copyist used the Notre Dame name, seal, and monogram without the university's consent, a misappropriation of property rights that the Seventh Circuit equated, without citing INS, to the theft of cash from the university's safe deposit box.

In Flint v. Oleet Jewelry Mfg. Co., the defendant copied the plaintiff's unpatented, uncopyrighted "Mustard Seed Remembrancer" locket, containing a mustard seed to remind users of the power of "so much faith as a grain of mustard" to move mountains (Matt. 17:20). The court found misappropriation under the INS doctrine and held that secondary meaning was no longer an essential element of unfair competition law in New York.

In Metropolitan Opera Ass'n v. Wagner-Nichols Recorder Corp., the trial court described New York misappropriation law as standing for the "broader principle that property rights of commercial value are to be and will be protected from any form of commercial immorality"; that misappropriation law developed "to deal with business malpractices offensive to the ethics of [] society"; and that the doctrine is "broad and flexible." In that case, the defendant engaged in a "business malpractice offensive to the ethics of society" since it copied and recorded the Met's opera broadcasts, which interfered with the Met's exclusive recording contract with Columbia Records. (At the time, the Copyright Act did not yet extend to sound recordings.) That was not a "hot news" case but rather an improper copying case. It shows the expansion of the INS doctrine beyond "hot news" to a more general misappropriation doctrine.

However, the Second Circuit subsequently held that New York law, so interpreted, was pre-empted by the 1976 Copyright Act. After quoting the foregoing language from Metropolitan Opera, the Second Circuit said:

However, we believe that Metropolitan Opera's broad misappropriation doctrine based on amorphous concepts such as "commercial immorality" or society's "ethics" is preempted. Such concepts are virtually synonymous for wrongful copying and are in no meaningful fashion distinguishable from infringement of a copyright. The broad misappropriation doctrine relied upon by the district court is, therefore, the equivalent of exclusive rights in copyright law.

At the same time, other Second Circuit case law, beginning shortly after the INS decision, has greatly limited the application of INS to general product copying. In those cases, typically, the doctrine requiring "secondary meaning" is invoked to bar plaintiff's recovery.

An illustrative case is the 1929 decision in Cheney Bros. v. Doris Silk Corp., which was decided a decade after INS. Many of the plaintiff's fabric designs (80%) were unsuccessful; plaintiff copied successful designs. The designs were not practicably copyrighted or patented and so "the plaintiff, which is put to much ingenuity and expense in fabricating them, finds itself without protection of any sort for its pains." Since the designs were short lived, plaintiff sought "hot-news" type of protection from equity, for less than a year. The Second Circuit, per Judge Learned Hand, denied relief: "In the absence of some recognized right at common law, or under the statutes—and the plaintiff claims neither—a man's property is limited to the chattels which embody his invention. Others may imitate these at their pleasure." As for the INS case, on which the plaintiff sought to rely, the court refused to apply it beyond its particular fact pattern:

Although that [case] concerned another subject-matter—printed news dispatches—we agree that, if it meant to lay down a general doctrine, it would cover this case; at least, the language of the majority opinion goes so far. We do not believe that it did. While it is of course true that law ordinarily speaks in general terms, there are cases where the occasion is at once the justification for, and the limit of, what is decided. This appears to us such an instance; we think that no more was covered than situations substantially similar to those then at bar. The difficulties of understanding it otherwise are insuperable. We are to suppose that the court meant to create a sort of common-law patent or copyright for reasons of justice. Either would flagrantly conflict with the scheme which Congress has for more than a century devised to cover the subject-matter.

Another illustrative case is the 1960 decision in American-Marietta Co. v. Krigsman, involving a sponge-mop replacement (for installation after the original sponge becomes worn out). The plaintiff did not attempt to protect functional features of the product, but only sought to prevent the copying of the nonfunctional arrangement of slots in the metal "presser plate" (hinged to the bottom of the mop) which is pressed against the sponge to squeeze water out. The rule against nonfunctional copying, the Second Circuit held (in an opinion by Judge Learned Hand), is restricted to cases where the nonfunctional element has acquired a secondary meaning:

It is indeed quite likely that buyers have assumed an identity of origin to the two mops from their general similarity; it is even possible-though we should suppose it very unlikely-that the identical form of the "slots" may have contributed to that assumption, but one who seeks to enjoin the reproduction of what is in the public domain must affirmatively show that the copied features were the reason for the confusion; it is not enough that perhaps it may have contributed [to it].

The implication of that line of cases is that the INS doctrine is being given very limited scope, particularly in contexts in which copyright law may dominate the field. Decisions from other circuits are consistent with those from the Second Circuit.

=== Kellogg case ===
In Kellogg Co. v. National Biscuit Co., in 1938, the Supreme Court considered a case arguably akin to INS but, with Justice Brandeis writing for the Court and now in the majority, denied relief:

Kellogg Company is undoubtedly sharing in the goodwill of the article known as Shredded Wheat; and thus is sharing in a market which was created by the skill and judgment of plaintiff's predecessor and has been widely extended by vast expenditures in advertising persistently made. But that is not unfair. Sharing in the goodwill of an article unprotected by patent or trade-mark is the exercise of a right possessed by all—and in the free exercise of which the consuming public is deeply interested.

One commentator maintained that one could properly

...view Kellogg as vindication of the views that he [Brandeis] expressed in INS. That Nabisco had invested in the shredded wheat product did not give it control over the use of the pillow shape (or the term SHREDDED WHEAT); it had no property right against misappropriation of the shape after the expiry of the patents. Instead, Brandeis inquired [only] whether Kellogg had engaged in any acts of misrepresentation.

=== Sears and Compco cases ===
The 1964 decisions of the Supreme Court in Sears v. Stiffel and Compco v. Day-Brite undermined the application of the INS doctrine to prohibit or penalize the copying of product designs to the point that the First Circuit said in 1967 that INS "has clearly been overruled." Those cases held that federal patent law preempts state laws that duplicate the patent laws or disturb the balance that patent law sets between competition and monopoly protection for inventions; as one commentator explained:

The implement selected by the Court to vindicate the competition–monopoly balance may be characterized as a per se rule. Any state law which operates to jar the balance, however incidentally, is, per se, an illegitimate impediment and to be condemned. In the view of Mr. Justice Black, writing for the majority, just "as a State cannot encroach upon the federal patent laws directly, it cannot, under some other law . . . give protection of a kind that clashes with the objectives of the federal patent laws." . . . Though International News Service has never been expressly overruled, the Court was, in Sears and Compco, apparently rejecting its approach.

Accordingly, such INS-based decisions as the Notre Dame ring case, the Flint mustard seed case, Haeger Potteries, Inc. v. Gilner Potteries, in which the court held that copying an ash-tray design "in precise detail as to design, shape and color, and in every other respect than quality, is nothing less than piracy," and Dior v. Milton, in which the court held that there was no good reason "why the rights of the plaintiff [in a dress design] should receive less protection than those of the sponsor of sporting events and the disseminator of news," can no longer survive: they have been given "the death knell." It is said that—

Stiffel and Compco now have made it clear that the misappropriation theory as applied to cases involving article duplication is to be rejected. . . . By applying the doctrine of preemption of the field by congressional enactment of federal patent and copyright laws, the Supreme Court has . . . rung the death knell for the misappropriation theory as applied to product simulation.

== See also ==
- List of United States Supreme Court cases, volume 248
- Associated Press v. United States (1945), an antitrust Supreme Court case
- Feist v. Rural (1991), holding that "copyright awards originality, not effort"
- Barclays Capital Inc. v. Theflyonthewall.com, Inc. (2d Cir. 2011)
