= Publici juris =

Legal Latin term

Publici juris is a legal Latin term, approximately translating to English as "of public right". An example is water in the sea.

Many times referred to in discussion of property rights in law.

"But the news element—the information respecting current events contained in the literary production—is not the creation of the writer, but is a report of matters that ordinarily are publici juris; it is history of the day." International News Service v. Associated Press, 248 U.S. 215, 234 (1918).

== See also ==
- Public domain
- Res communis
