= Quasi-property =

Legal concept

Quasi-property is a legal concept, in which some rights similar to ownership may accrue to a party who does an act which benefits society as a whole. Black's Law Dictionary defines "quasi" as being "almost" or "resembling" - but not actually the same as the suffix item.

== Examples ==
A notable and early occurrence of quasi-property being found by a court under American law was the case of International News Service v. Associated Press. The Associated Press sued International News Service for taking the substance of AP news stories, rewriting the articles, and publishing the stories in its own member newspapers. This activity did not violate copyright law because the original AP articles were not copyrighted, and also because the subsequent INS articles copied only the facts— using different language to report the story.

Nonetheless, the Court recognized an interest in the news distributor of information they had researched and gathered. A traditional property right would have granted the AP a right to exclude others from the content of their news stories good for all time and against everyone. The court described this new right as quasi-property because it only granted them the power to exclude their competitors for a limited amount of time from the substance of their articles. The general public had free rein to distribute the subject matter of the news without restriction. Creation of the new right was justified as protecting the AP from the "unfair competition" of a party who was reproducing the information and attempting to profit by distributing it faster than the creator.

== See also ==
- Life estate
- Property law
- Quasi-contract
- Quasi-criminal
- Status offense
- Trust (law)
