= Bonito Boats, Inc. v. Thunder Craft Boats, Inc. =

- Supreme Court of the United States

Argued December 5, 1988 Decided February 21, 1989
- Full case name: Bonito Boats, Inc. v. Thunder Craft Boats, Inc.
- Citations: 489 U.S. 141 (more) 109 S. Ct. 971; 103 L. Ed. 2d 118; 1989 U.S. LEXIS 629; 57 USLW 4205; 9 U.S.P.Q.2d 1847

Case history
- Prior: 487 So. 2d 395 (Fla. 5th DCA 1986); affirmed, 515 So. 2d 220 (Fla. 1987); cert. granted, 486 U.S. 1004 (1988).

Holding
- The Florida statute is preempted by the Supremacy Clause, because it partially duplicated and therefore interfered with federal patent law.

Court membership
- Chief Justice William Rehnquist Associate Justices William J. Brennan Jr. · Byron White; Thurgood Marshall · Harry Blackmun; John P. Stevens · Sandra Day O'Connor; Antonin Scalia · Anthony Kennedy

Case opinion
- Majority: O'Connor, joined by unanimous

Laws applied
- U.S. Const. Art. VI

Bonito Boats, Inc. v. Thunder Craft Boats, Inc., 489 U.S. 141 (1989), is a decision of the United States Supreme Court holding a state anti-plug molding law preempted because it partially duplicated and therefore interfered with the balance Congress had struck by federal patent law. The decision reaffirmed the Supreme Court's earlier decision in Sears, Roebuck & Co. v. Stiffel Co. (1964), which held a state unfair competition law preempted on the same ground.

== Background ==
Bonito Boats developed a hull design for a fiberglass recreational boat and marketed it as the "Bonito 5VBR." The manufacturing process involved creating a hardwood model that was then sprayed with fiberglass to create a mold. The mold then served to produce the finished fiberglass boats for sale. No patent application was filed to protect the utilitarian or design aspects of the hull or the manufacturing process by which the finished boats were produced.

After the Bonito 5VBR had been on the market for six years, the Florida Legislature enacted a "plug molding" statute that prohibits the use of a direct molding process to duplicate unpatented boat hulls, and forbids the knowing sale of hulls so duplicated. Bonito Boats then filed an action in a Florida Circuit Court, alleging that Thunder Craft Boats had violated the statute by using the direct molding process to duplicate the Bonito 5VBR fiberglass hull and by knowingly selling such duplicates. Bonito Boats sought damages, injunctive relief, and an award of attorney's fees under the Florida law.

The Circuit Court granted Thunder Craft's s motion to dismiss the complaint on the ground that the statute conflicted with federal patent law, and was therefore invalid under the Supremacy Clause of the Federal Constitution. The Florida Court of Appeals and the Florida Supreme Court affirmed.

The Federal Circuit had reached a contrary result in Interpart Corp. v. Italia, upholding a California law prohibiting plug molding. The Supreme Court granted certiorari to resolve the conflict.

== Opinion of the Court ==
In a unanimous opinion for the Court, Justice O'Connor began by noting:

From their inception, the federal patent laws have embodied a careful balance between the need to promote innovation and the recognition that imitation and refinement through imitation are both necessary to invention itself, and the very lifeblood of a competitive economy.

This concern continued, and federal patent law ever since has been concerned with "the difficult business 'of drawing a line between the things which are worth to the public the embarrassment of an exclusive patent, and those which are not.'" This balance is reflected in the statutory line drawing as to the required degrees of novelty and nonobviousness for issuance of a patent:

Taken together, the novelty and nonobviousness requirements [of the patent statute] express a congressional determination that the purposes behind the Patent Clause are best served by free competition and exploitation of that which is either already available to the public, or that which may be readily discerned from publicly available material.

These novelty and nonobviousness requirements of patentability "embody a congressional understanding . . . that free exploitation of ideas will be the rule, to which the protection of a federal patent is the exception." Accordingly, a parallel state law system could disturb the balance Congress struck" "State law protection for techniques and designs whose disclosure has already been induced by market rewards may conflict with the very purpose of the patent laws by decreasing the range of ideas available as the building blocks of further innovation." Accordingly, "the federal patent laws must determine not only what is protected, but also what is free for all to use."

Thus, as such past decisions as Sears and Compco "have made clear that state regulation of intellectual property must yield to the extent that it clashes with the balance struck by Congress in our patent laws." And: "Where it is clear how the patent laws strike that balance in a particular circumstance, that is not a judgment the States may second-guess." The prior Supreme Court decisions "correctly concluded that the States may not offer patent-like protection to intellectual creations which would otherwise remain unprotected as a matter of federal law."

The Federal Circuit, in its Interpart opinion argued that a plug-molding statute "prevents unscrupulous competitors" from taking advantage of the work of the originator while leaving later comers free to design and manufacture their own products, and "the patent laws say nothing about the right to copy or the right to use, they speak only in terms of the right to exclude." The Court found this reasoning "defective."

First: "Appending the conclusionary label 'unscrupulous' to such competitive behavior merely endorses a policy judgment which the patent laws do not leave the States free to make." That decision is left to the federal government and its determination was that copying the functional attributes of unpatented products that are in general circulation "is legitimate competitive activity."

Second, as for the Federal Circuit's proposition that the patent laws say "nothing about the right to copy or the right to use," there is a federal right to copy and the Federal Circuit's "assertion to the contrary is puzzling, and flies in the face" of decisions interpreting Sears and Compco. Those cases require that "copying of the article itself that is unprotected by the federal patent and copyright laws cannot be protected by state law."

This is a field that Congress has fully occupied, leaving no room for parallel state regulation, whether conflicting, complementary, or supplemental:

[T]he federal standards for patentability, at a minimum, express the congressional determination that patent-like protection is unwarranted as to certain classes of intellectual property. The States are simply not free in this regard to offer equivalent protections to ideas which Congress has determined should belong to all.

... The Florida law substantially restricts the public's ability to exploit an unpatented design in general circulation, raising the specter of state-created monopolies in a host of useful shapes and processes for which patent protection has been denied or is otherwise unobtainable. It thus enters a field of regulation which the patent laws have reserved to Congress. The patent statute's careful balance between public right and private monopoly to promote certain creative activity is a scheme of federal regulation so pervasive as to make reasonable the inference that Congress left no room for the States to supplement it.

... It is for Congress to determine if the present system of design and utility patents is ineffectual in promoting the useful arts in the context of industrial design. By offering patent-like protection for ideas deemed unprotected under the present federal scheme, the Florida statute conflicts with the strong federal policy favoring free competition in ideas which do not merit patent protection. We therefore agree with the majority of the Florida Supreme Court that the Florida statute is preempted by the Supremacy Clause, and the judgment of that court is hereby affirmed.

== Impact and subsequent developments ==
In 1998, Congress subsequently enacted the Vessel Hull Design Protection Act (VHDPA) as part of the Digital Millennium Copyright Act, providing copyright-like or sui generis protection to boat hull designs, under a registration system something like that of the Semiconductor Chip Protection Act (SCPA). This law creates ten years of copyright-like protection for boat hull designs.

The VHDPA was too late for Bonito Boats, however. According to the U.S. Coast Guard, Bonito Boats went out of business on July 16, 1991.

== See also ==
- List of United States Supreme Court cases, volume 489
- List of United States Supreme Court cases
- Lists of United States Supreme Court cases by volume
- List of United States Supreme Court cases by the Rehnquist Court
