= Misappropriation =

Illegal use of someone's identity or assets

In law, misappropriation is the unauthorized use of another's name, likeness, identity, property, discoveries, inventions, etc. without that person's permission, resulting in harm to that person.

Another use of the word refers to intentional and illegal use of property or funds; it can particularly refer to actions committed by a public official.

Article 17 of the United Nations Convention against Corruption specifies that each State party should criminalize misappropriation, embezzlement, or other diversion of priority by public officials.

== Criminal law ==
In criminal law, misappropriation is the intentional, illegal use of the property or funds of another person for one's own use or other unauthorized purpose, particularly by a public official, a trustee of a trust, an executor or administrator of a deceased person's estate or by any person with a responsibility to care for and protect another's assets (a fiduciary duty). Depending upon the jurisdiction and value of the property, misappropriation may be a felony, a crime punishable by a prison sentence.

== Scientific research ==
In scientific research, misappropriation is a type of research misconduct. An investigator, scholar or reviewer can obtain novel ideas during the process of the exchange of ideas amongst colleagues and peers. However, improper use of such information could constitute fraud. This can include plagiarism of work or to make use of any information in breach of any duty of confidentiality associated with the review of manuscripts or grant applications.

== Consequences of misappropriation ==
Misappropriation can have very serious consequences, including imprisonment, fines, probation, and a permanent criminal record.

The punishment for misappropriation may be determined by the value of the property affected and previous criminal record.

== Defenses ==
Since misappropriation is considered a form of theft, arguments countering charges of theft can be modified and utilized against misappropriation, including:

- Property did not belong to the plaintiff. Information which is available to everyone, such as facts in a news story, is considered public and thus cannot be owned by the plaintiff.
- Independent development of property. The defendant did not "take" the plaintiff's trade secrets if the defendant created the trade secrets independent of the plaintiff's knowledge, resources and involvement.
- Consent by the plaintiff. If the plaintiff had given the defendant permission to use the property for a purpose, then the defendant cannot be guilty of misuse if the defendant used the property for that purpose.

== Differences between misappropriation and embezzlement ==
Embezzlement is misappropriation when the property or funds involved have been lawfully entrusted to the embezzler. In circumstances where the funds are accessible to, but not entrusted to, the perpetrator, it is not embezzlement but can still be considered larceny, misappropriation, misapplication, or some other similar term.

== Examples of misappropriation ==
For an example, see §1803 of the Judicial Council of California's Civil Jury Instructions from 2013.
