= The Seed Savers' Network =

- Abbreviation: SSN
- Formation: 1986
- Founder: Jude and Michel Fanton
- Website: seedsavers.net

The Seed Savers' Network (SSN) is an Australian not-for-profit organisation, based in Byron Bay, New South Wales. Since 1986, SSN has organised gardeners and farmers to collect, multiply and redistribute garden seeds in Australia and also within peasant organisations worldwide.

SSN operates on the premise that seeds are best kept in their socio-cultural context. It promotes conservation and development of agricultural biodiversity in situ, that is, on-site with growers, rather than in seed banks. The organisation educates the public on the importance of locally saved seeds, their heritage and associated cultural diversity. It has produced three books and two documentaries.

== History ==
SSN was founded in 1986 by Michel and Jude Fanton. Jude is the daughter of Sally and Graham F Smith, the latter a long-time peace activist in Adelaide and inspiration for the Graham F. Smith Peace Foundation. Michel is the son of Claudine and Henri Fanton, the latter a member of the French Resistance in WWII, and a survivor of the Dachau concentration camp. They feel they continue the resistance work of their parents with this organisation. The Seed Savers' Network is registered as a charitable organisation.

Commencing in the year 2000 and completed in 2008, SSN decentralised its seed collection, multiplication and distribution of seeds to over 100 affiliated Local Seed Networks (LSNs) around Australia. Gardeners exchange excess seeds and garden produce at LSN events.

== Rationale ==
The rationale for the network is that plant genetic resources are essential to sustainable agriculture and food security. Globally, there has been a decline in agricultural biodiversity with the Food and Agriculture Organization reporting in 2010 that 75 per cent had been lost in the previous century.

Agencies of the United Nations have prioritised the conservation of traditional varieties of useful plants by gardeners and farmers.

Plant genetic diversity continues to play a central role in shaping agriculture growth in the face of climate change. By farmers and gardeners conserving seeds, each seed generation is able to adapt to changes in climate.

Home gardens are micro-environments that contain levels of species and varietal diversity higher than those found in nearby agro-ecosystems. Home gardens are thus important as reservoirs of agricultural biodiversity. Of equal importance are the gardeners / peasants who have the skills and knowledge of its utilisation. Seeds with proprietary rights – plant variety rights – are not suitable for home seed saving as it is illegal to propagate from patented seed.

== Activities in Australia ==
Since its establishment in 1986, the Seed Savers' Network has collected and conserved local varieties within a network of gardeners who save and swap locally adapted seeds. From 1986 to 2008 it had a seed bank that received seed samples from around Australia.

Over the space of eight years, culminating in 2008, that seed flow has been decentralised out to sub-groups, Local Seed Networks. These groups collect and distribute local varieties in their region to reinforce local genetic characteristics.

Since its inception SSN has been based within research gardens, designed on permaculture principles, where varieties are trialled:

- In Nimbin, Australia, from 1986 to 1991
- In Byron Bay, Australia, from 1998 to the present (2015)

There are also kitchens where the produce is trialled for taste and nutrition.

SSN promotes and popularises seed saving and educates for seed saving skills via its newsletters, posters, publications, documentaries, the internet and the media with over 500 articles about it.

== Global activities ==
The SSN has delivered community seed bank training and helped form seed networks in several dozen nations with non-government organisations, universities and government departments. Some examples of SSN's global activities are listed below:-

=== Solomon Islands ===
Helped in the establishment of the Planting Materials Network and in several projects conserving traditional local varieties of crops such as vegetables, sweet potatoes, taros, bananas and cereals and pulses for chicken feed. Aided the Kastom Gaden Association in the organisation of over 100 varieties of bananas. The collection was made on the island of Makira and was fully described with internationally recognised descriptors. Varieties were restored to farmers. A collection of 843 varieties of taro nationally with Planting Materials Network funded by the EU and Tarogen network (South Pacific Commission).

=== Tonga ===
Save our Seed Project with The Commonwealth Foundation.

=== Ecuador ===
Helped establish Red de Guardianes de Semillas in 2003.

=== Cambodia ===
Worked with the Department of Women's and Veterans' Affairs in 1998 and 1999.

=== Sabah, Malaysia ===
Worked with People and Plants on education projects aimed at the restoration of planting useful native species with Dusun Kadasan tribals in 1998.

=== Afghanistan ===
Worked with NICCO, a Japanese aid agency, in the Agricultural Faculty of Herat University. Also worked with Slow Food, Italy, in the promotion of traditional varieties of grapes in Herat in 2003.

=== The Gambia and Senegal ===
Advised and researched seed networking with Concern Universal in 2013.

== See also ==
- Gardening in Australia
