= J. E. M. Ag Supply, Inc. v. Pioneer Hi-Bred International, Inc. =

- Supreme Court of the United States

Argued October 3, 2001 Decided December 10, 2001
- Full case name: J. E. M. Ag Supply, Inc., DBA Farm Advantage, Inc., et al. v. Pioneer Hi-Bred International, Inc.
- Docket no.: 99-1996
- Citations: 534 U.S. 124 (more) 122 S. Ct. 593; 151 L. Ed. 2d 508; 2001 U.S. LEXIS 10949; 70 U.S.L.W. 4032; 60 U.S.P.Q.2d 1865
- Argument: Oral argument
- Opinion announcement: Opinion announcement

Case history
- Prior: 200 F.3d 1374 (Fed. Cir. 2000); cert. granted, 531 U.S. 1143 (2001).
- Subsequent: Sub nom. Pioneer Hi-Bred Int'l, Inc. v. Ottawa Plant Food, Inc., 283 F. Supp. 2d 1018 (N.D. Iowa 2003)

Holding
- Newly developed plant breeds fall within the subject matter of 35 U.S.C. § 101, and neither the Plant Patent Act nor the Plant Variety Protection Act limits the scope of § 101's coverage.

Court membership
- Chief Justice William Rehnquist Associate Justices John P. Stevens · Sandra Day O'Connor; Antonin Scalia · Anthony Kennedy; David Souter · Clarence Thomas; Ruth Bader Ginsburg · Stephen Breyer

Case opinions
- Majority: Thomas, joined by Rehnquist, Scalia, Kennedy, Souter, Ginsburg
- Concurrence: Scalia
- Dissent: Breyer, joined by Stevens
- O'Connor took no part in the consideration or decision of the case.

Laws applied
- 35 U.S.C. § 101, 7 U.S.C. § 2321, and 35 U.S.C. §§ 161–164

J. E. M. Ag Supply, Inc. v. Pioneer Hi-Bred International, Inc., 534 U.S. 124 (2001), was a decision of the United States Supreme Court holding for the first time that utility patents may be issued for crops and other flowering (sexually reproducing) plants under 35 U.S.C. § 101. The Supreme Court rejected the argument that the exclusive ways to protect these plants are under the Plant Variety Protection Act (PVPA), 7 U.S.C. § 2321, and the Plant Patent Act of 1930 (PPA), 35 U.S.C. §§ 161-164.

== Background ==
Pioneer Hi-Bred International, Inc. (Pioneer) owns patents that cover the manufacture, use, and sale of various hybrid corn seed products (plants and seeds). Pioneer sells its patented hybrid seeds under a limited label license that provides: "License is granted solely to produce grain and/or forage." The license says that it "does not extend to the use of seed from such crop or the progeny thereof for propagation or seed multiplication," and prohibits "the use of such seed or the progeny thereof for propagation or seed multiplication or for production or development of a hybrid or different variety of seed."

J.E.M. Ag Supply, Inc., doing business as Farm Advantage, Inc., purchased patented hybrid corn seeds from Pioneer in bags bearing the foregoing label license. Farm Advantage resold these bags without authorization from Pioneer to do so. Pioneer then sued Farm Advantage (J.E.M.) and several of its distributors and customers. Pioneer alleged that J.E.M. had "for a long-time past been and still [is] infringing one or more [Pioneer patents] by making, using, selling, or offering for sale corn seed” covered under the patents.

J.E.M. responded that Pioneer's patents that purport to confer protection for corn plants are invalid because sexually reproducing plants are not patentable subject matter within the scope of 35 U.S.C. § 101 J.E.M. maintained that the Plant Variety Protection Act (PVPA) (and perhaps also the Plant Patent Act of 1930 (PPA)) and set forth the exclusive statutory means for the protection of complex plant life. J.E.M. argued that these statutes are more specific than § 101, and thus carve out subject matter from § 101 for special treatment. J.E.M. said that awarding utility patents for plants upsets the scheme of protection contemplated by Congress. Part of that scheme is that the PVPA provides exemptions for farmers to save seed from their crops for planting subsequent crops. Utility patents do not contain such exemptions.

== Lower court rulings ==
The district court and Federal Circuit rejected J.E.M.’s arguments and held that it infringed Pioneer’s patents.

The case went to the Federal Circuit on an interlocutory appeal of the denial of summary judgment. The only issue on appeal from the district court was whether seeds and plants grown from seeds of sexually reproduced plants are patentable subject matter within the scope of 35 U.S.C. § 101—i.e., are patent eligible. There was no other issue, such as whether J.E.M.'s conduct (selling seeds) was patent infringement under 35 U.S.C. § 271(a) or whether resale of purchased seed in defiance of a label license prohibiting resale was shielded from infringement liability by the exhaustion doctrine or whether growing crops from the seed constituted "making" under that statute. Nonetheless, J.E.M. argued "that the specifications of Pioneer's patents are not enabling; they criticize the written description and the utility of the deposits, and generally challenge validity." The Federal Circuit responded, "These issues were not decided by the district court, and are not before us." Addressing the only issue properly before it, the court held seeds and plants grown from seeds of sexually reproduced plants are patentable subject matter within the scope of 35 U.S.C. § 101.

== Supreme Court ==
=== Opinion of the Court ===
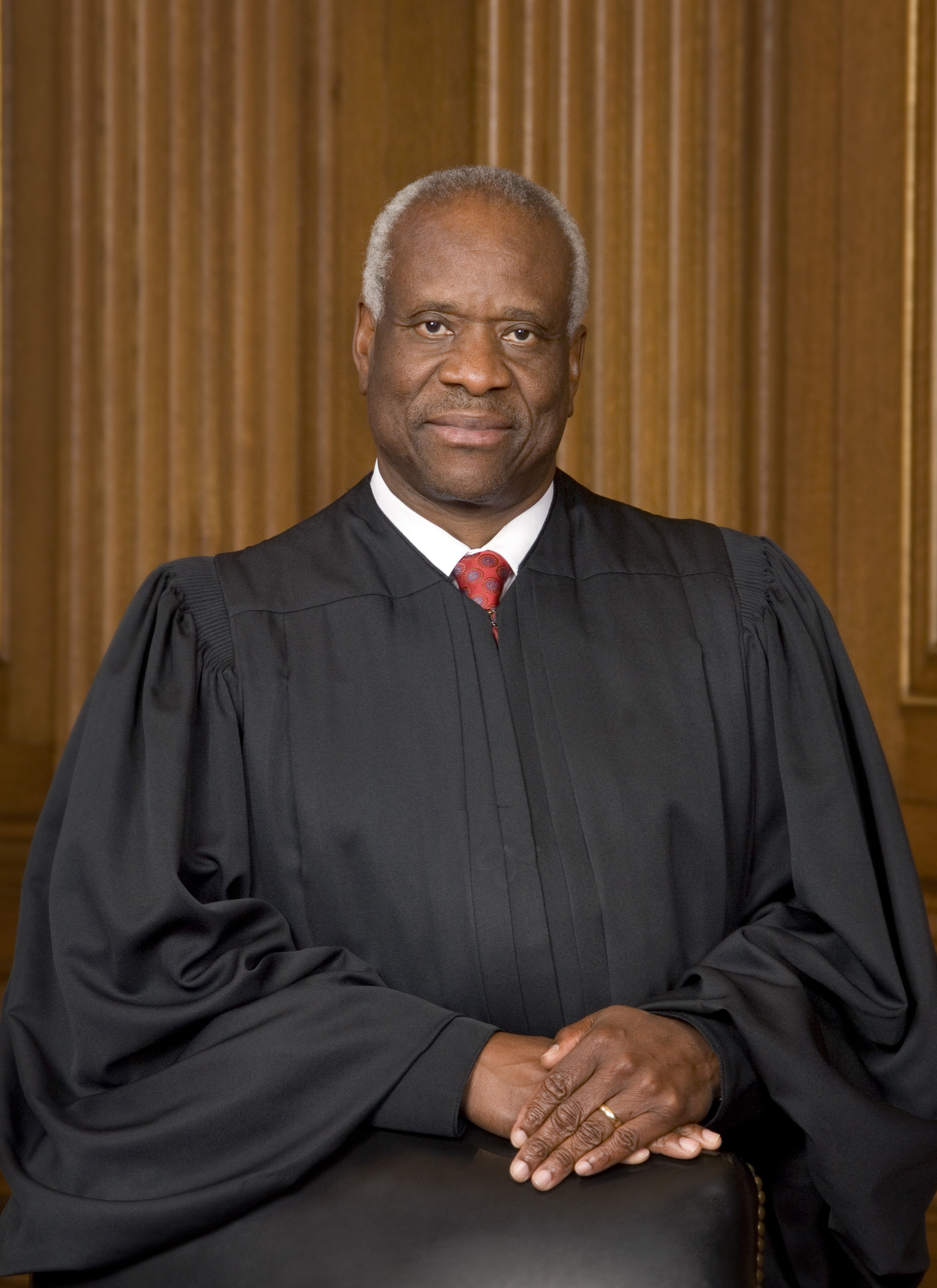
Justice Thomas, author of the majority opinion

Justice Clarence Thomas delivered the opinion of a 6-2 court. The majority of the Court considered the case governed by the decision twenty years previous in Diamond v. Chakrabarty, 447 U.S. 303, 312-13 (1980). In that case, the Court had upheld the entitlement of a company to a utility patent on a man-made micro-organism capable of digesting oil spills. It rejected the Patent Commissioner's argument that living things could not be patented, saying: "The relevant distinction was not between living and inanimate things, but between products of nature, whether living or not, and human-made inventions."

The Court said that J.E.M. did not dispute that plants “fall within the terms of § 101's broad language that includes ‘manufacture’ or ‘composition of matter.’ " The argument that J.E.M. made against Pioneer stood or fell with J.E.M.’s proposition that Congress intended the PVPA (or it and the PPA) to be the sole means for protecting plant inventions. But the Court said it disagreed.

To be sure, the Court said, when Congress passed the PPA in 1930 it did so because it thought plants could not be protected under the regular patent law (what is now § 101). Among other things it thought living things could not be patented under regular patent law. Congress was mistaken, the Court held, as is shown by the Chakrabarty decision:

As this Court held in Chakrabarty, "the relevant distinction" for purposes of § 101 is not "between living and inanimate things, but between products of nature, whether living or not, and human-made inventions."

The Court found the same true for the PVPA. Under that law, however, “A farmer who legally purchases and plants a protected variety can save the seed from these plants for replanting on his own farm.” The PVPA and also the PPA operate in parallel with § 101 of the utility patent law. They provide different degrees of protection and have different requirements for securing protection. The later laws do not supersede the earlier one.

The Court concluded:

For these reasons, we hold that newly developed plant breeds fall within the terms of § 101, and that neither the PPA nor the PVPA limits the scope of § 101's coverage. As in Chakrabarty, we decline to narrow the reach of § 101 where Congress has given us no indication that it intends this result.

=== Dissent ===
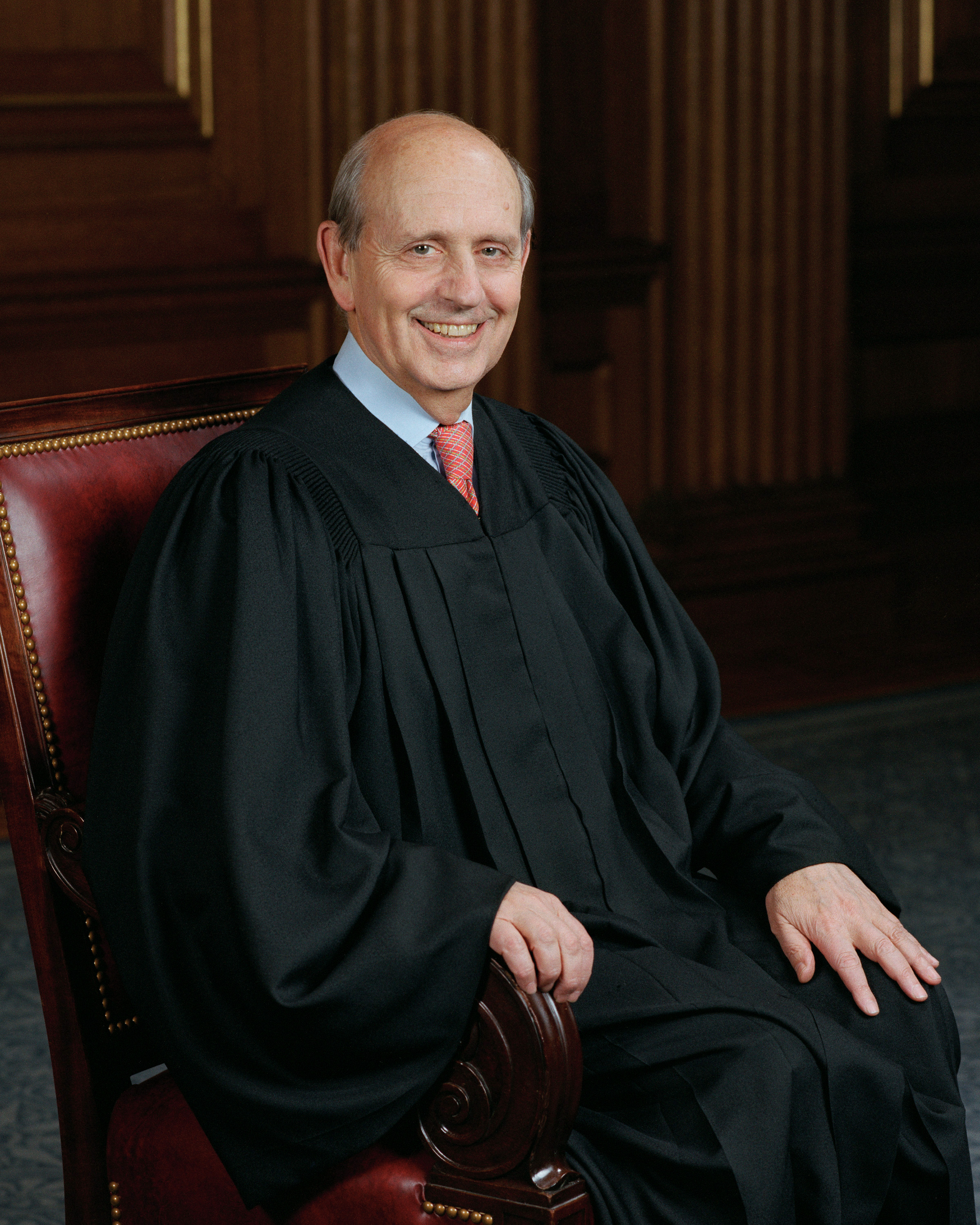
Justice Breyer, author of the dissent

Justice Stephen Breyer dissented, joined by Justice John Paul Stevens. They believed the terms “manufacture” and “composition of matter” do not cover crop plants (sexually reproduced or flowering plants) and their seeds. That was because Congress intended the two more specific PPA and PVPA statutes to exclude patent protection under the more generic utility patent statute. Further, "this Court neither considered, nor decided, this question in Chakrabarty."

In Chakrabarty the issue was whether the words “manufacture” and “composition of matter” in § 101 “included such living things as bacteria–a substance to which neither of the two specific plant Acts refers.” The Chakrabarty Court then decided that § 101 covered “a 'new' bacterium because it was 'a non-naturally occurring manufacture or composition of matter' that was 'not nature’s handiwork.'” It said nothing about plants (such as corn). Further a bacterium is not the kind of plant that the PPA and PVPA “had in mind.” Thus, “Chakrabarty neither asked, nor answered . . . the question now before us.”

He ended by criticizing the majority for not making "an effort to divine the human intent that underlies the statute," based on "an analysis of language, structure, history, and purpose."

== Subsequent history after remand ==
Ottawa Plant Food, Inc., was one of the companies to which J.E.M. sold bags of Pioneer's patented corn, and Ottawa was added to the case as a defendant during the litigation. After the Supreme Court's 2002 decision, all of the other defendants settled with Pioneer, leaving Ottawa as the only remaining defendant in the case. The parties then filed cross-motions for summary judgment.

Ottawa argued that the patent exhaustion doctrine shielded it from liability. The court held that the doctrine did not apply because of the Federal Circuit's decision in Mallinckrodt, Inc. v. Medipart, Inc., that a patentee may limit buyers' use of patented products it sells to them by placing restrictive labels (label licenses) on the products before sale. The cour therefore held, "The court concludes that it is Pioneer, not Ottawa, that is entitled to summary judgment on Ottawa's 'patent exhaustion' defense."

Ottawa also argued that "Pioneer's restrictions on resale are unenforceable, as against public policy, because they are anticompetitive in effect, or violate contract principles, so that Pioneer's infringement claim premised on its restrictions on resale must fail." Turning again to the Mallinckrodt decision, the court rejected Ottawa's argument that the label license was unenforceable as anticompetitive. The court also turned back Ottawa's contract law arguments, holding that Uniform Commercial Code (UCC) § 2-207(2)(c) required Ottawa to have objected to the label license's terms within a reasonable time, which it did not do, in order not to be bound by them.

== Subsequent developments ==
=== Bowman case ===
Several years later, in the 2013 Supreme Court decision in Bowman v. Monsanto Co., the Court operated on the assumption that this case and Chakrabarty had resolved the issues of patent protection of crop plants. Justice Breyer did not renew his dissent that Chakrabarty did not resolve all of the issues, or even address them. The Court held, without dissent, that farmers who saved seeds from patented crops and used the seed to grow a subsequent crop committed patent infringement.

=== Commentary ===
In a much-cited article, Malla Pollack criticized the decision in these terms:

Congress never decided to allow private entities the power to block experimentation on food crops; Congress never decided to allow full utility patents on sexually reproduced plants. The courts and the PTO have illegitimately bypassed representative government to create and enforce such private power.

She agreed that the Constitution permitted Congress to pass a law establishing such legal protection, if it so chose, because farming was within the "useful Arts" in 1789. She insisted, however, that Congress did not choose to pass such a law. She also criticized the Court's interpretation of the relevant statutory words: "The Court, however, did not recite any 1790, 1793, or 1952 use of 'manufacture' or 'composition of matter' which, even allegedly, included food crops."

Richard H. Stern questioned the J.E.M. Court's precedential reliance on Chakrabarty and the Court's subsequent extension of the J.E.M. decision to a determination that these two cases inexorably led to the outlawing of the saving and "replanting" of patented seed in Bowman v. Monsanto Co. He argued that these two cases did not govern (or address) infringement issues under 35 U.S.C. § 271(a), as contrasted with the validity issues under 35 U.S.C. § 101 that the two earlier cases actually addressed:

[N]either Chakrabarty nor J.E.M. Ag Supply involved the issue of whether planting and growing a crop from the seed of a patented plant constituted patent infringement. . . . [T]hat issue turns on the meaning of the statutory word "make," which neither of the earlier two cases addressed.

On the other hand, Kevin M. Baird applauded the decision because of the economic protection it granted agricultural industry:

In Pioneer, the United States Supreme Court laid to rest the question of whether sexually reproduced plants were statutory subject matter under section 101. The Court made clear that if inventors of new varieties of plants are able to meet the stringent patentability standards of section 101 and section 112, they will be entitled to utility patent protection. Additionally, the Court clarified that section 101 can also be reconciled with the PPA and the PVPA. In fact, the three statutes may provide overlapping protection and are not mutually exclusive. Thus, inventors of new plant varieties are free to apply for protection under each regime and may benefit from the protection provided by each regime.

Timothy P.Daniels considered the decision from the standpoint of universities and their agricultural research programs:

The benefit of the J.E.M. decision is that universities will be able to more easily capture the full economic value of their plant genetic inventions and discoveries. The negative aspect of this case, however, is that professors and universities will be hesitant to publish their findings until they have obtained IP protection or until they believe the discovery is not worth marketing.

...Developments in plant biotechnology present universities with the problematic issue of biopiracy and with the opportunity to provide significant humanitarian service.

Ann Crocker considered the potential international implications of the decision and suggested its possible expansion worldwide:

The international patent scene has become a hotbed of controversy following the decisions of U.S. courts to recognize living things as patentable subject matter. Patent lawyers representing the interest of the U.S. biotechnology industry are in the forefront of the debate, pressing for other countries to adopt more extensive patent laws recognizing living materials as patentable subject matter, just as U.S. courts and the United States Patent & Trademark Office have.

...[B]iotechnology lobbyists and advocates will likely use the J.E.M. Ag Supply decision to push for greater adoption of full patent protection by other nations, pointing out that plants have been receiving full patent protection in the United States for the past twenty years, and that the rest of the world should view western patent law as a model.

The legal and agricultural communities, as well as the public, must be educated to realize that this is not simply an issue of corporate profits. As shown with the example of Roundup Ready soybeans grown in Argentina and Brazil, the future of American agriculture may be jeopardized if American farmers alone bear the costs of the research and development for development of new GM varieties. Extending patent protection for plants to the international level . . . could be an important next step.

== Controversy ==
Justice Clarence Thomas, who made the majority decision on the case, was a lawyer for Monsanto in the 1970s, was not required to recuse himself from the case. At the time of the case, Monsanto had been profiting greatly from patenting and selling their GM seeds.
