= Frank Morton =

Frank Morton may refer to:

- Frank Morton (cricketer) (1901–1971), Australian cricketer
- Frank Morton (chemical engineer) (1906–1999), professor of chemical engineering
- Frank Morton (journalist) (1869–1923), journalist and poet in Australia
- Frank Morton (plant breeder) (born 1955), founding member of the Open Source Seed Initiative
