= Open Source Seed Initiative =

Organization promoting open source licensed seeds

The Open Source Seed Initiative (OSSI) is an organization that developed and maintains a mechanism through which plant breeders can designate the new crop varieties they have bred as open source. This mechanism is advanced as an alternative to patent-protected seeds sold by large agriculture companies such as Monsanto or DuPont. OSSI is a U.S. based not-for-profit 501(c)(3) organization focusing on establishing a protected commons of open source varieties and on educational and outreach activities associated with the development of this open source seed commons and on seed rights and issues related to the control of seed.

The OSSI was founded in 2012 by a group of plant breeders, farmers, and seed companies. Founders include Jack Kloppenburg, Irwin Goldman, Claire Luby, Thomas Michaels, Frank Morton, Jonathan Spero, Alejandro Argumedo, and Jahi Chappell. Tom Stearns was an early supporter and advisor to the OSSI founders. Carol Deppe and C.R. Lawn joined the OSSI board of directors in its early stages, providing invaluable contributions from the freelance breeding community and the seed industry. OSSI is governed by a board of directors and as of July 2017 includes 36 plant breeders and 46 seed company partners in its work. Members of the group are unhappy with the patenting of plant varieties, as they say the patenting of seeds restricts plant breeders' freedom and increases the power of large seed companies. Taking inspiration from open source software, the OSSI seeks to create a "protected commons" of open-source seed varieties as an alternative to patented or otherwise legally restricted seeds. At first the OSSI tried to draft a legally-defensible license, but they found that the principle of software licenses did not translate easily to plants, as a license on plant seeds would need to continue to each new generations of plants, quickly creating a huge amount of legal work. The OSSI eventually decided to use an informal Pledge printed on every seed packet or transmitted along with the seed, both for simplicity and because they felt this less restrictive approach was more in line with the goals of the project.

== Pledge and mission ==
The Open Source Seed Initiative Pledge asks farmers, gardeners, and plant breeders who use the seed to refrain from patenting or licensing the seed or derivatives from it, and to pass on the Pledge to any derivatives made. The Pledge states: "You have the freedom to use these OSSI-Pledged seeds in any way you choose. In return, you pledge not to restrict others' use of these seeds or their derivatives by patents or other means, and to include this Pledge with any transfer of these seeds or their derivatives." Use of the Pledge ensures the four open source seed freedoms for this and future generations, including:

1. The freedom to save or grow seed for replanting or for any other purpose.
2. The freedom to share, trade, or sell seed to others.
3. The freedom to trial and study seed and to share or publish information about it.
4. The freedom to select or adapt the seed, make crosses with it, or use it to breed new lines and varieties.

OSSI's mission bears some similarities to the mission of organizations such as Seed Savers Exchange, but it is different in that OSSI provides an explicit Pledge with its seeds that is designed to keep seeds free through the establishment of a protected commons. OSSI differs from plant breeders' rights and plant variety protection in that the Pledge allows recipients to do anything they want with the seed except restrict it. In addition, it automatically extends the Pledge to new varieties developed from OSSI-Pledged parents. In addition, OSSI does not Pledge heirlooms or indigenous varieties. It only Pledges varieties contributed and Pledged by their breeders.

OSSI involves plant breeders and seed company partners in its mission. First OSSI works with plant breeders who commit to making one or more of their varieties available exclusively under the OSSI Pledge. OSSI Partner Seed Companies sell OSSI-Pledged varieties, acknowledge the OSSI breeders in their variety descriptions, label OSSI-Pledged varieties with the OSSI logo, and include the Pledge and information about OSSI in their catalogs and on their websites. The Seed List of OSSI-Pledged varieties gives complete descriptions and photos for each OSSI-Pledged variety and links to every OSSI Partner Seed Company that carries each variety.

OSSI also places articles in magazines for gardeners and farmers during the seed ordering season so as to attract visitors to its website and channel those visitors to its seed company partners where they can buy the seed. See, for example, Carol Deppe's article in the January issue of Acres/USA- Thirty-three Great Open-Source Organic-Adapted Vegetable Varieties. OSSI thus creates a market for ethically produced, "freed seed" analogous to the markets for "fair trade" and "organic" products.

== Influences and early history ==
The work of University of Wisconsin sociologist Jack Kloppenburg, particularly his book First the Seed: The Political Economy of Plant Biotechnology, 1492-2000 (2nd ed.) influenced the development of OSSI. Originally published in 1990, then updated in 2000, this book chronicles the vast changes in seed sovereignty that took place during the 20th century through the rise of modern plant breeding approaches, the expansion of intellectual property rights, and emerging crop biotechnologies. Kloppenburg's work explored global consequences of legal control over crop seeds during an era of heavy consolidation in the seed industry. Kloppenburg himself was inspired by the work of writers and activists Pat Roy Mooney, a Canadian, and Cary Fowler, an American, who began engaging with issues of the public versus private ownership of seed and genetic resources in the 1970s. While some of these views were criticized by plant breeders in the 1980s and 1990s, Kloppenburg argued that the expansion of intellectual property rights over crop genetic resources, including cultivars, genes, and plant traits, is an issue of concern for the future of global agriculture. Kloppenburg documented the ever-increasing encroachments upon the traditional rights of farmers, gardeners, and plant breeders to save, replant, share, or breed with seed, as well as forced plant breeders and all others interested in crop genetic resources to confront the degree to which they had lost or were losing "freedom to operate" with their seeds. (This term "freedom to operate" has come to mean the degree to which seeds and the genes contained in those seeds can be freely used by breeders, gardeners, farmers, and seed producers without legal restriction.)

One of the consequences of an increasing global awareness of the finite nature of crop genetic resources and the debate over ownership of these resources has been the establishment of gene banks and seed banks in many countries, notably Fowler's recent efforts to develop the Svalbard Global Seed Vault off the coast of Norway in the Arctic Svalbard Archipelago. Kloppenburg's focus on the ownership and control of those resources still remains one of the most pressing questions for future generations.

International efforts, coordinated through the Food and Agriculture Organization of the United Nations and the United Nations Environment Program, and manifest through agreements such as the International Treaty on Plant Genetic Resources for Food and Agriculture and the Convention on Biological Diversity, have sought global solutions to sustainable and fair use of the planet's crop genetic resources. While these efforts are ongoing, significant limitations to global germplasm exchange still challenge and limit their potential gains.

Building from these ideas, plant breeder Thomas Michaels proposed General Public License for Plant Germplasm (GPLPG) in 1999. The objective of the license was to build a pool of shared plant germplasm that could be freely used for breeding new crop varieties. The two key features of this license were 1) that GPLPG varieties were freely available for use in as a parent any breeding program and 2) that new varieties developed using one or more GPLPG parents must also be designated as GPLPG. The license was explicitly modeled on the General Public License that had been developed by Richard Stallman and others in the computer software community. General Public License for Plant Germplasm was the first license of its kind to treat the plant genotype as if it were computer source code that can be freely used in a new program (crop variety) so long as the new program (crop variety) is also designated as General Public License.

Open Source Seed Initiative, founded some 15 years later, creates a seed commons involving the method of germplasm exchange based upon a Pledge. Any user can gain access to the germplasm and use it for any purpose, as long as they pledge not to restrict others' use of this same germplasm as well as to pass the Pledge along if they share or sell the germplasm. OSSI provides maximal freedom to operate for those who wish to save, replant, share, sell, trade, breed, and otherwise innovate with seeds.

== Release of OSSI varieties and current activity ==
In April 2014, the OSSI released its first 36 open-source seed varieties.

NPR opined in their report in 2014 that large seed companies would be unlikely to use open-source seeds, as patented seeds are more profitable. And they speculated that farmers may have trouble finding open-source seeds for sale. However by July, 2017, OSSI had over 375 varieties of more than 50 crops bred by 36 breeders and being sold by 46 seed company partners. While varieties have been contributed by public sector plant breeders at universities and not-for-profit organizations, most OSSI varieties have been contributed by freelance plant breeders and seed companies.

On 10 August 2015 an OSSI-Pledged red romaine lettuce variety called 'Outredgeous' bred by farmer-breeder Frank Morton became the first plant variety to be planted, harvested and eaten entirely in space, as a part of Expedition 44 to the International Space Station.

OSSI has also become a topic of academic research in both the biological and social sciences. OSSI appears in The Sociology of Food and Agriculture by Michael Carolan. Several scientific journal articles have explored ideas surrounding open source plant breeding, genetic variation, and intellectual property.

OSSI was highlighted in Rachel Cernansky's piecem "How 'Open Source' Seed Producers from the US to India are Changing Global Food Production", originally published in Ensia magazine, and reprinted in many different outlets, including Vox and Global Voices.

OSSI has developed a relationship with Seed Savers Exchange. Seed Saver's new online and print editions of the Garden Seed Inventory will label all OSSI-Pledged varieties with the OSSI logo and the name of the breeder, and will include the Pledge in the beginning of the book.
