= Friedrich Kessler =

German-American legal academic (1901–1998)

- Born: August 25, 1901; Hechingen, Hohenzollern, Prussia
- Died: January 21, 1998 (aged 96); Berkeley, California, U.S.
- Education: University of Berlin
- Scientific career
- Fields: Legal studies
- Workplaces: Yale Law School; University of Chicago Law School; University of California, Berkeley School of Law

Friedrich "Fritz" Kessler (August 25, 1901 – January 21, 1998) was an American law professor who taught at Yale Law School (1935–1938, 1947–1970), University of Chicago Law School, and University of California, Berkeley School of Law. He was a contract law scholar, but he also wrote about trade regulation law. He was regarded as a member of the American Legal Realism School.

== Biography ==
Born in Hechingen, Province of Hohenzollern, in 1901, he received his law degree from the University of Berlin in 1928. He was a research member of the Kaiser Wilhelm Institute of Foreign and International Law in Berlin until 1934, when he fled Germany to avoid Nazi persecution, as his wife, Eva Jonas, was Jewish.

Friedrich Kessler died on January 21, 1998, in Berkeley, California, aged 96.

== Scholarship ==
Kessler's most celebrated article, Contracts of Adhesion—Some Thoughts About Freedom of Contract, elaborates the concept of "contrat d'adhésion" which originated in French civil law at the end of the 19th century and was introduced in American jurisprudence in a 1919 Harvard Law Review article by Edwin Patterson. The phrase "contract of adhesion" describes a contract between parties of greatly unequal bargaining power, such that the dominant party could impose a "take it or leave it" demand on the weaker party. He argued that in such situations Eighteenth or Nineteenth Century concepts of freedom of contract were unrealistic and should be discarded. Kessler saw such contracts as mocking freedom of contract, making it "a one-sided privilege,” in which the historical evolution of the law from status to contract was reversed—a movement "greatly facilitated by the fact that the belief in freedom of contract has remained one of the firmest axioms in the whole fabric of the social philosophy of our culture.”

Kessler described himself as a Legal Realist and also wrote on that doctrine. In his article, Natural Law, Justice and Democracy—Some Reflections on Three Types of Thinking About Law and Justice, Kessler maintained that the task of legal realism was "constantly testing out the desirability, efficiency and fairness of inherited legal rules and institutions in terms of the present needs of society." He argued also, however, that we should not "overestimate conscious at the expense of unconscious processes."

== Publications ==
Book

Contracts: cases and materials (1st edn 1953) up to 3rd edition with Grant Gilmore and Anthony T. Kronman

Articles

- "Contracts of Adhesion—Some Thoughts About Freedom of Contract" (1943) 43(5) Columbia Law Review 629
- Natural Law, Justice and Democracy—Some Reflections on Three Types of Thinking About Law and Justice, 19 Tulane L. Rev. 32, 52 (1944)
- Automobile Dealer Franchises: Vertical Integration by Contract, 66 Yale L. J. 1135 (1957).
- Contract, Competition, and Vertical Integration, 69 Yale L.J. 1 (1959) (with Richard H. Stern)
- Culpa in Contrahendo, Bargaining in Good Faith, and Freedom of Contract: A Comparative Study, 77 Harv. L. Rev. 401 (1964) (with Edith Fine)
