= Plant Patent Act of 1930 =

American law with national jurisdiction

- Long title: An act to provide for plant patents
- Enacted by: the 71st United States Congress
- Effective: June 17, 1930

Citations
- Public law: Pub. L. 71–245
- Statutes at Large: 46 Stat. 703

Codification
- U.S.C. sections created: 35 U.S.C. § 161

Legislative history
- Introduced in the United States Senate as S. 4015 by John G. Townsend Jr. R‑DE on January 6, 1930; Committee consideration by United States Senate Committee on Patents; United States House Committee on Patents; Passed the Senate on May 12, 1930; Passed the House on May 16, 1930 (H.R. 11372, introduced by Fred Sampson Purnell R‑IN 9th); Signed into law by President Herbert Hoover on May 23, 1930

United States Supreme Court cases
- Diamond v. Chakrabarty; J.E.M. Ag Supply v. Pioneer

The Plant Patent Act of 1930 (enacted on June 17, 1930 as Title III of the Smoot–Hawley Tariff, ch. 497, 46 Stat. 703, codified as 35 U.S.C. Ch. 15) is a United States federal law spurred by the work of Luther Burbank and the nursery industry. This piece of legislation made it possible to patent new varieties of plants, excluding sexual and tuber-propagated plants (see Plant Variety Protection Act of 1970). Plant patents, such as (April 5, 1932), were issued to Burbank posthumously. In supporting the legislation, Thomas Edison testified before Congress in support of the legislation and said, "This [bill] will, I feel sure, give us many Burbanks."

During the congressional debates about the Plant Patent Act, some of the key issues were: what kinds of plant qualified as patentable subject matter; what exactly did a breeder have to do in order to qualify as an inventor; and what was the relationship between the act of invention and the act of reproducing the invention. These issues were overcome by adopting a new concept of invention that has been characterized as 'inductive' invention, by arguing that "although the ‘sports’ or spontaneous mutations from which they bred new varieties often occurred naturally, the skill of identifying the mutation, isolating it, and then reproducing it was a work of invention."

Uniquely, the Plant Patent Act "eliminated the standard industrial patent requirement that the invention be described sufficiently well to enable someone skilled in the art to reproduce it." The need for this new type of patents (plant patents) arises from the written description requirement of utility patents. Whereas human-made machines (and their inventive parts) can be described precisely, similarly accurate description is not possible for living things: even if a complete DNA sequence in every chromosome is known, it is not possible with modern technology to establish the limits of the DNA variation with the accuracy required for composition-of-matter claims.

The scope of the rights offered by the Plant Patent Act was arguably curtailed by the US Court of Appeals decision in 1995, Imazio Nursery Inc. v. Dania Greenhouses, 36 U.S.P.Q. 2d 1673, which held that "to establish infringement of a plant patent it is necessary to prove that the accused plant is derived from, i.e. a copy of, the actual plant which prompted the filing of the application for plant patent." In other words, the power of utility patents to block a similar invention, that was made independently from the patent owner, does not apply to plant patents.

== Controversy ==
The legislation did not receive much popular attention until several decades later, during the development of plant breeders' rights through the UPOV 1961 treaty and the enactment of the US Plant Variety Protection Act of 1970, which coincided with broader critiques of intellectual property and its relationship to human health, food security, and the environment. The criticism became more intense when the Plant Patent Act was cited to support patent protection for genetically modified organisms in US Supreme Court cases like Diamond v. Chakrabarty and J.E.M. Ag Supply v. Pioneer Hi-Bred. Many activists and scholars have suggested that there is a connection between plant patent protection and the loss of biodiversity, although such claims are contested.

== Recent trends ==
Although the US Department of Agriculture announced that it would accept applications for plant variety protection for industrial hemp (Cannabis sativa) after 24 April 2019, none have been granted to date, and breeders have instead sought intellectual property protection through the Plant Patent Act of 1930, such as Cannabis plant named ‘RAINBOW GUMMEEZ’ (June 30, 2020).
