= Australian Grains Genebank =

Plant gene bank in Horsham, Victoria, Australia

- Location in Victoria

General information
- Status: Active
- Type: Seed bank Research institute Public building
- Location: Horsham, Victoria, Australia
- Coordinates: 36°43′S 142°12′E
- Opened: March, 2014
- Cost: US$3 million

Design and construction
- Architect: H2o Architects PTY Ltd.
- Known for: Storing seeds from Australia

The Australian Grains Genebank (AGG) is a national center for storing genetic material for plant breeding and research. The Genebank is in a collaboration with the Australian Seed Bank Partnership on an Australian Crop Wild Relatives project. It is located at Grains Innovation Park, in Horsham, Victoria, Australia.

== Objectives and challenges ==
The Australian Grains Genebank (AGG) aims to collect and conserve the seeds of Australian crop wild species, that are not yet adequately represented in existing collections. 40 key species of crop wild, 32 of which are endemic to Australia, have been identified as being crucial to increasing Australia's stock of grain crops. Seeds of crop wild relatives (CWR) will be available to plant breeders and researchers in order to develop the plant varieties of the future. The seeds will be stored not only in the Australian Grains Genebank but also in the Australian Seed Bank Partnership member seed banks. This project will enable research into new plant varieties, that are vital to Australia's agricultural future. Progress can be made in understanding the genetic material contained in the crops.

One of the main objectives of the Australian Grains Genebank is helping the research; for this reason, this institution distributes about 25,000 packets of seeds to scientists in Australia and overseas. Therefore, they can evaluate this material for characteristics that could be used to breed more productive grain crops. These characteristics include the resistance to heat, frost, drought, pests and diseases.

Another fact about Australian Grains Genebank is that it uses a DNA-based soil testing service, to assist grain growers in predicting the losses from various diseases before a crop is planted. Growers have the option of changing cultivars or modifying cropping programs, in situations where the risk of crop loss is high. The service was launched in 1997 and the initial focus was on grain and barley, but pathogens of rotation crops are now included.

== Facilities ==
In 2009 the Victorian Government provided $3 million to Sally Norton, leader of the Australian Grains Genebank to make the bank, also promising $600,000 per year for the next five years toward operating costs. The bank was officially opened in March, 2014. The budget is provided by the Government of Victoria and the Grains Research and Development Corporation, a corporation that is supported by the Government of Australia.

The AGG is a national seed store bank completed by H2o architects, on the Wimmera flatland at the edge of Horsham, Victoria, for the Victorian Department of Environment and Primary Industries. The facility has more than 2.7 kilometres of space to give a secure store for seed specimens. The building is also used for seed development, seed requests and contains a packaging and receiving area, administration areas, drying facilities, freezers working at -20 degrees Celsius and a multipurpose national reception area, or lobby, to accommodate visiting groups.

A double skin freezer design has an inner esky box of isolated panels, used for storing seeds and contained within an outer wood clad weather protecting cover. This design makes certain that the freezers work with less charge, reduce the energy consumption and operating costs of the facility. Efficiency is reached with a robust and environmentally responsible mechanical system.

The building has a strong presence and provides innovation in design, technology and materials. The exterior layer is very similar to a pergola, with thousands of timber slats, each one 120 centimetres long, creating the top layer.

== Storage conditions and regeneration ==
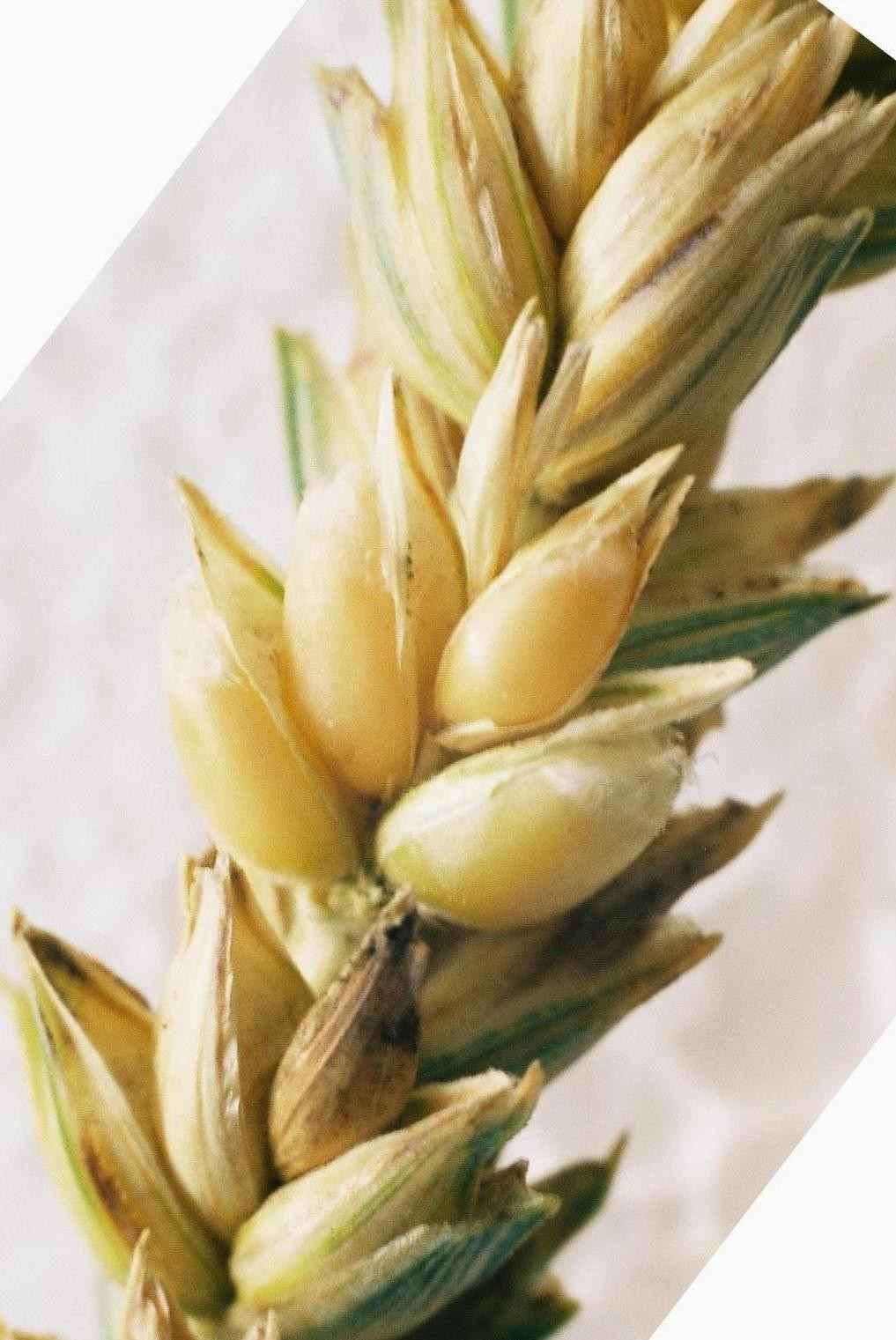
Wheat Ear milk full

The Horsham bank is the biggest of its kind and is designed for long-term storage. The material they conserve includes released crop varieties, breeding materials, and crop wild relatives. It serves not only producers but also processors, marketers, breeders and regional farming communities. Peter Walsh, the Victorian Minister of Agriculture, explained that the bank could contain about 300 million seeds from all around the globe. The bank has the capacity to hold 200,000 packets of seeds and more than 200 different crop species. In 2017 the collection held about 138,016 different seeds (or assessions), and it is growing about 3000 seeds each year.

The most representative crop names stored are:

- Wheat with 42,624 different species coming from different areas of the world, mainly from Europe, Australia and Africa.
- Barley with 19,062 different types, mainly from Europe and Central Asia.
- Chickpea with 9,771 different breeds, coming from Australia, Africa, Europe and Asia Minor.
- Pea with about 7,558 different categories, principally coming from Europe, the United States, South America and Australia.
- Lentil with 5,061 different species, coming from Asia Minor, Central Asia, Europe and Africa.

The seed drying room operates at 15 degrees Celsius and 15% of humidity. Seeds remain in this room form four to six weeks to dry down to around 6% seed moisture before being sealed into foil packets and placed under long-term storage at -20 degrees Celsius.

AGG routinely conduct seed viability monitoring tests because seeds lose their ability to germinate, even under long-term conditions. Once seed germination drops below 85%, and the seed quantity they have in the store is below 500 seeds, the genebank regenerates the seed. They regenerate around 4000 different samples per year under field and greenhouse environments. When they regenerate seeds, they consider the biology of the plants to ensure the right soil mix, temperatures, control pollination for outcrossing species.

== Longevity ==
In order to keep the seeds safe, they are stored in 2.7 kilometres of shelf space at -20 degrees Celsius (-4 degrees Fahrenheit) with very low moisture. The seeds can remain viable for 50 or 100 years (depending on the kind of seed), preserving, in this way, the genetic materials.

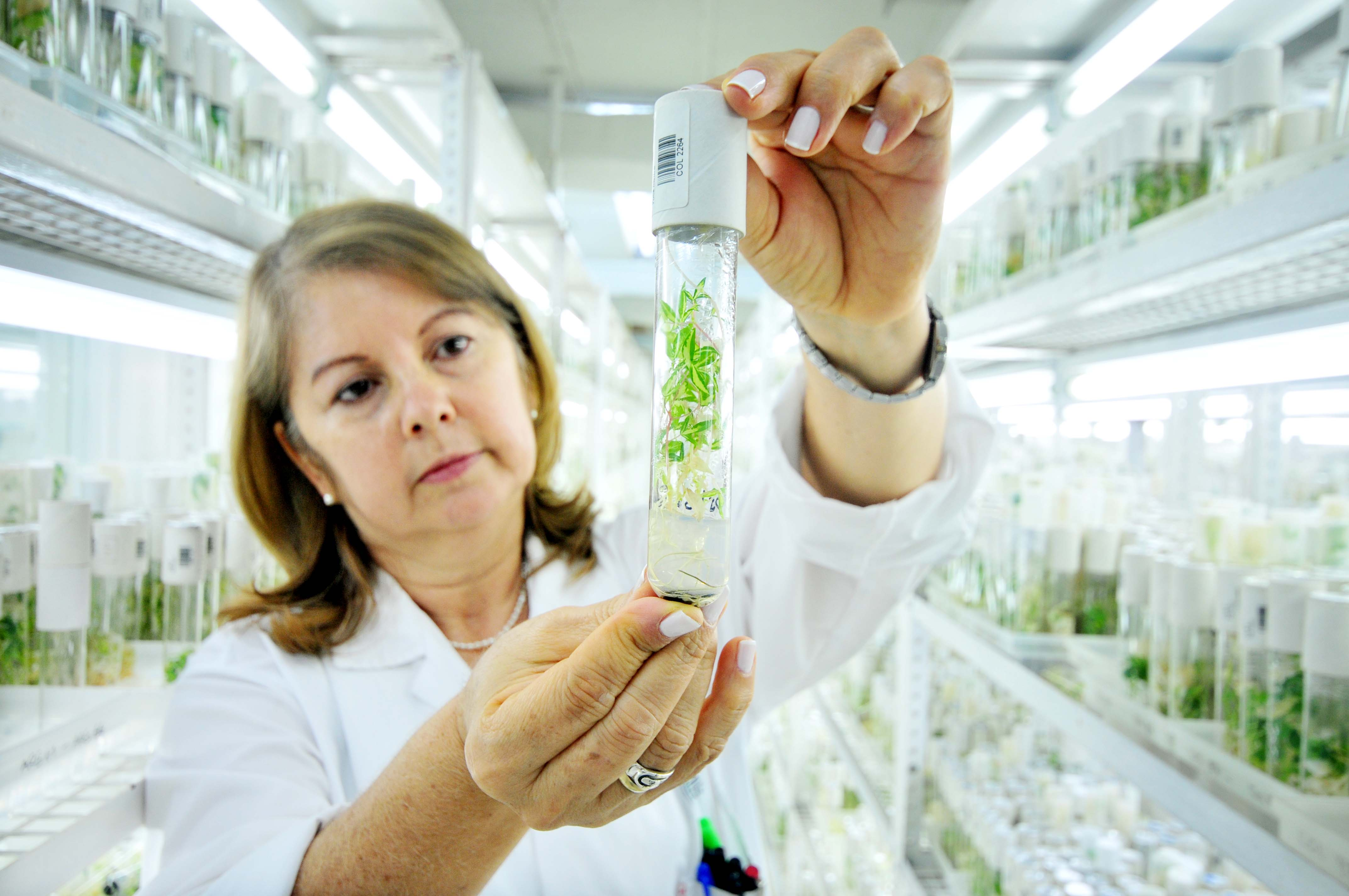
Genebank

The primary reason for the bank to be created was the extreme temperatures in the area, up to 40 degrees Celsius (104 degrees Fahrenheit) in the summertime. Because of that, they had to ensure the protection of the grains all year around.

The longevity of seeds differs; some keep well for decades, crops are grown out regularly and new grains assembled to increase the collection. A database carries the information about the origin and characteristics of each seed line (none genetically modified) and features of seed viability and the quantity held.

Seeds are placed in controlled maturing environments with high temperatures and a certain humidity (RH; 45 °C and 60% RH). The Lithium chloride (LiCl) helps to obtain the right RH environment.

The seed survival curve, that can be acquired from the germination test, is compared with the longevity of ‘marker’ species aged under the same conditions. From here, longevity categories can be distinguished: this is most important for alpine seeds, as recent proofs show that grains from cooler and wetter habitats are shorter lived than seeds from warmer ones. Longevity checks can also indicate how seeds should be conserved.

== Australian Seed Bank Partnership ==
The main goal of the Australian Seed Bank Partnership is to save about 1700 native species of plant and ecological communities facing extinction due to habitat loss, and the fragmentation and degradation of invasive species. To accomplish this objective, the partnership maintains a safe and sustainable environment, and collects and stores seeds to help research on the subject.

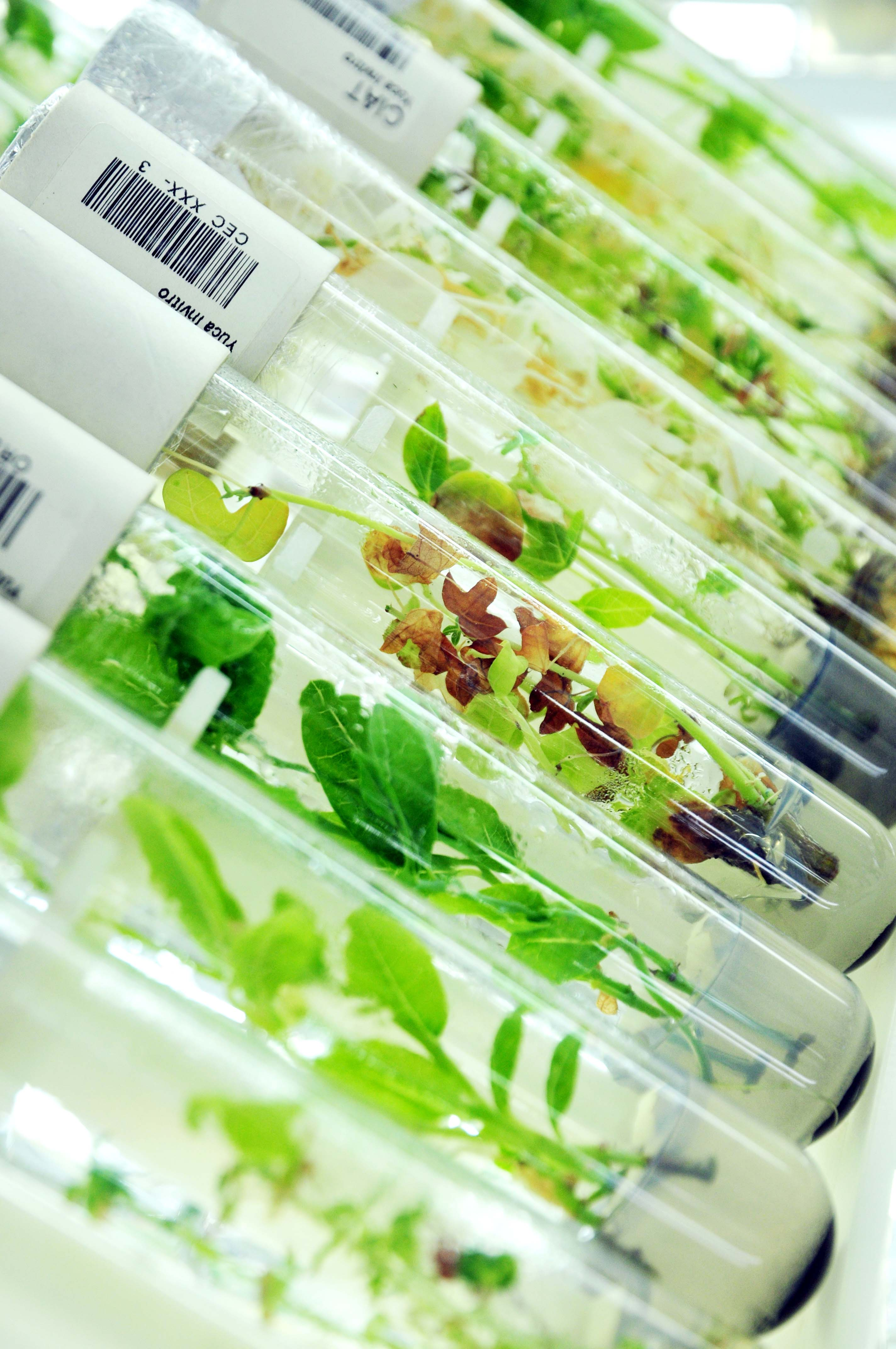
Genebank's seeds

The Australian Grains Genebank is one of the most important members of the Australian Seed Bank Partnership, which is an alliance between 12 organizations that are trying to deal with the multitude of threats facing Australian biodiversity by working together. The partnership consists of nine seeds banks, that are storing and conserving seeds, and three flora-focused organizations, that have the mission not only to fulfill the gap between policymakers, researcher, and seed collectors, but also to manage the on-ground conservation and restoration activities. The activities related to the Australian Seed Bank Partnership consist of four simple concepts: collecting, research, supporting restoration and sharing knowledge.

- Collecting: the process of collection and conservation of the native seeds is carried out by organizations, non-profit institutions and community groups, that are working together to provide a future-proof insurance policy for Australian's unique seed flora, which is particularly important in time of environmental stress. One of the main activities, in the field of collecting and storing seeds, involves the coordination of seasonal seeds collecting fields trips. Some experts, in fact, follow a rigid protocol to recognize, collect, clean and store seeds. The experts have also the important task of recording the information (such as the time of the year the seed has been collected, the associated vegetation and the soil type in the seed-collecting region) and the principal characteristics of the seed. Those information are considered fundamental to the seed banks' future rule in conservation.
- Research: to keep the collected seeds available for a long time and under controlled conditions, the research process is a central concept. To store a seed properly the researcher must establish what is required by each category or type of seed (for example if they require a specific temperature or if it needs light and moisture cues to germinate).
- Supporting Restoration: one of the most important activities in which the Australian Seed Bank Partnership is involved, is the recording of all the data about Australian native crops. This process is considered that important because it informs the restoration of plant communities and landscapes. In order to achieve this objective, the Australian Seed Bank Partnership applies the scientific knowledge to the field and shares it with the restoration community. This institution, thanks to this process, has already saved a lot of Australian native plants, discovered new species and rediscovered species that they thought to be extinct in the wild.
- Sharing knowledge: The Australian Seed Bank Partnership shares his knowledge among all the existing Australian conservation seed banks, restoration practitioners, and community groups. By sharing this knowledge, they hope to build a greater understanding of seed science in Australia.

The Australian Grains Genebank is related to the Australian Seed Bank Partnership. They are actually collaborating on an Australian Crop Wild Relatives project. Through this project, these two institutions are trying to store all the Australian crop wild relatives, that are not yet represented in the ex-suit collection. The 32 wild crop species will be stored and preserved on the facilities of the Australian Grains Genebank. This project is considered really important, because saving and storing the wild crops will enable researchers into new plant varieties, that will be important for the future and the development of the Australian agriculture.

== See also ==
- Conservation movement
- Gene bank
- Biodiversity
- Gene pool
- Agroecology
- Millennium Seed Bank Partnership
- Svalbard Global Seed Vault
- Seed bank
- Seed
- Seed saving
