= Seedy Sunday =

Seed saving event

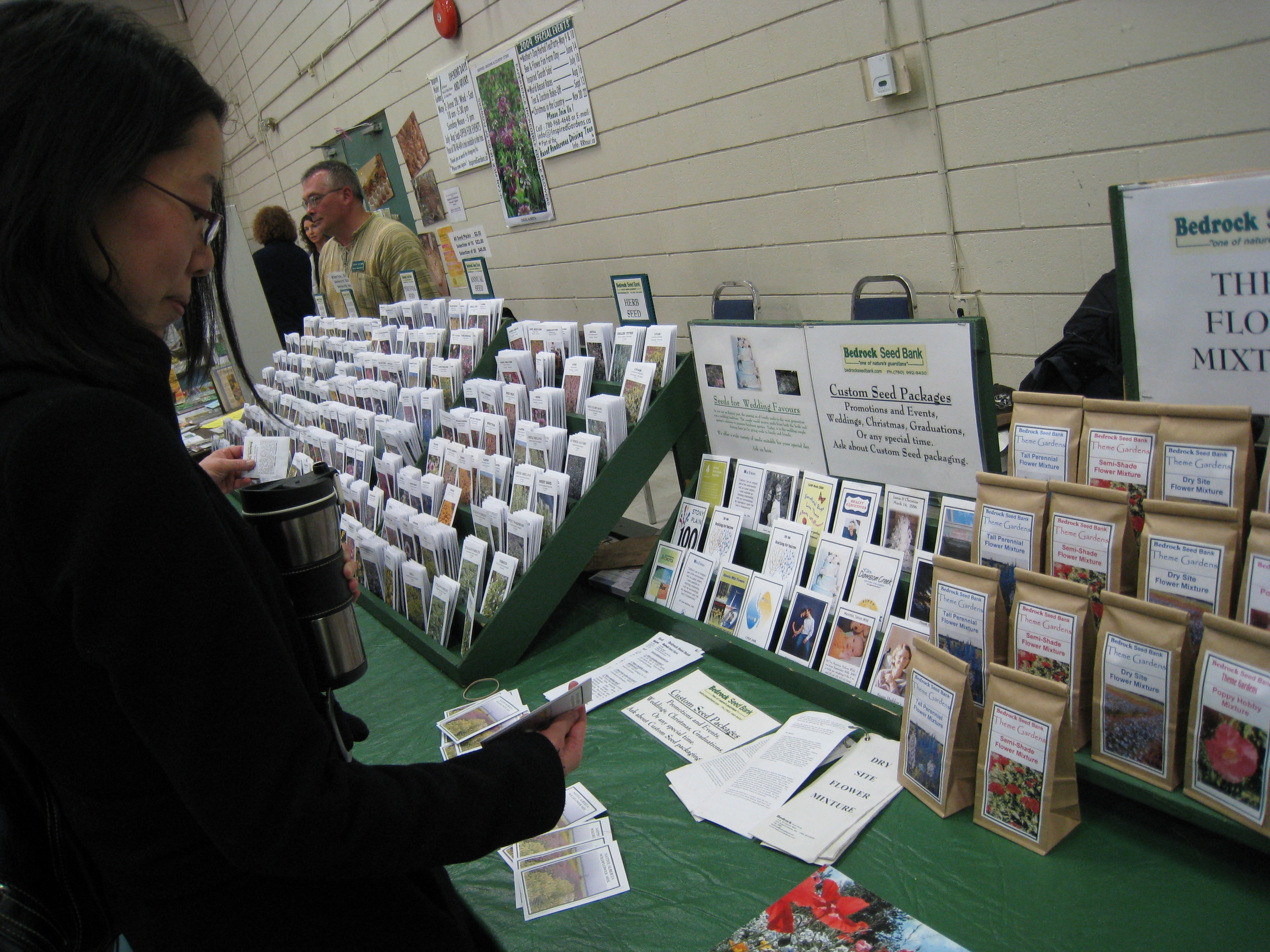
A Seedy Sunday stall in Edmonton, Canada

A Seedy Sunday (or Seedy Saturday) event is one where people swap and sell seeds of landraces, folk varieties, farmer varieties and heritage seed. Sharing information about the social, cultural and culinary aspects of the seed is an important part of heritage seed saving around the world. Providing education about techniques for seed-saving, small-scale agriculture and horticulture, and about local, national and international laws that affect public-domain crop plants can also be an important part of the event.

The titles Seedy Saturday and Seedy Sunday were dedicated to the public domain by the event founder Sharon Rempel. The first Seedy Saturday was held at VanDusen Botanical Garden in Vancouver, Canada, in 1990.

== History ==
The idea of conserving heritage varieties of garden and field crops was in its infancy in Canada in 1989. It was very difficult to find heritage varieties of vegetables, fruits, flowers and grains.

In 1988 Sharon Rempel wanted to find period-appropriate heritage vegetables, flowers and wheat for the 1880s heritage gardens she was creating at the Keremeos Grist Mill museum. The Abundant Life Seed Foundation in Washington state was her sole source that added the date of the variety with the seed listing.

Rempel organized the first Seedy Saturday event. It was held at VanDusen Botanical Garden in Vancouver, Canada, in early 1990.

In Canada, Seedy Saturdays and Seed Sundays continue to be locally or regionally organized events. Almost all of these events occur in the late winter, with a few in the autumn. In 2012 there were more than 100 events held in Canada.

== See also ==
- Seed swap
- Agricultural biodiversity
- Agritourism
- Crop diversity
- Genetic diversity#Agricultural relevance
