= Plant breeders' rights =

Right of exclusive control over a plant

Plant breeders' rights (PBR), also known as plant variety rights (PVR), are rights granted in certain places to the breeder of a new variety of plant that give the breeder exclusive control over the propagating material (including seed, cuttings, divisions, tissue culture) and harvested material (cut flowers, fruit, foliage) of a new variety for a number of years. The system of plant breeders' rights is considered a sui generis form of intellectual property rights.

With these rights, the breeder can choose to become the exclusive marketer of the variety, or to license the variety to others. In order to qualify for these exclusive rights, a variety must be new, distinct, uniform, and stable. A variety is:

- new if it has not been commercialized for more than one year in the country of protection;
- distinct if it differs from all other known varieties by one or more important botanical characteristics, such as height, maturity, color, etc.;
- uniform if the plant characteristics are consistent from plant to plant within the variety;
- stable if the plant characteristics are genetically fixed and therefore remain the same from generation to generation, or after a cycle of reproduction in the case of hybrid varieties.

The breeder must also give the variety an acceptable "denomination", which becomes its generic name and must be used by anyone who markets the variety.

Typically, plant variety rights are granted by national offices after examination. Seed is submitted to the plant variety office, which grows it for one or more seasons, to check that it is distinct, stable, and uniform. If these tests are passed, exclusive rights are granted for a specified period (typically 20/25 years, or 25/30 years for trees and vines). Renewal fees (often, annual) are required to maintain the rights.

Breeders can bring suit to enforce their rights and can recover damages. Plant breeders' rights contain exemptions that are not recognized under other legal doctrines such as patent law. Commonly, there is an exemption for farm-saved seed. Farmers may store this production in their own bins for their own use as seed, but this does not necessarily extend to "brown-bag sales" (i.e. resale of farm-saved seed to neighbors in the local area). Further sales for propagation purposes are not allowed without the written approval of the breeder. There is also a breeders' exemption (research exemption in the 1991 Act) that allows breeders to use protected varieties as sources of initial variation to create new varieties of plants (1978 Act), or for other experimental purposes (1991 Act). There is also a provision for compulsory licensing to assure public access to protected varieties if the national interest requires it and the breeder is unable to meet the demand.

There is tension over the relationship between patent rights and plant breeder's rights. There has been litigation in Australia, the United States, and Canada over the overlap between such rights. Each of these cases was decided on the principle that patents and plant breeders' rights were overlapping and not mutually exclusive. Thus, the exemptions from infringement of plant breeders' rights, such as the saved seed exemption, do not create corresponding exemptions from infringement of the patents covering the same plants. Likewise, acts that infringe the plant breeders' rights, such as exportation of the variety, would not necessarily infringe a patent on the variety, which only allows the patent owner to prohibit making, using, or selling (first sale, but not resale) the patented invention.

== International rights ==
In 1957, in France negotiations took place concerned with the protection of new varieties. This led to the creation of the Union Internationale pour la Protection des Obtentions Végétales (UPOV) and adoption of the first text of the International Convention for the Protection of New Varieties of Plants (UPOV Convention) in 1961. The purpose of the Convention was to ensure that the member states party to the Convention acknowledge the achievements of breeders of new plant varieties by making available to them an exclusive property right, on the basis of a set of uniform and clearly defined principles.

The Convention was revised in Geneva in 1972, 1978 and 1991. Both the 1978 and the 1991 Acts set out a minimum scope of protection and offer member States the possibility of taking national circumstances into account in their legislation. Under the 1978 Act, the minimum scope of the plant breeder's right requires that the holder's prior authorization is necessary for the production for purposes of commercial marketing, the offering for sale and the marketing of propagating material of the protected variety. The 1991 Act contains more detailed provisions defining the acts concerning propagating material in relation to which the holder's authorization is required. The breeder's authorization is also required in relation to any of the specified acts done with harvested material of the variety, unless the breeder has had reasonable opportunity to exercise their right in relation to the propagating material, or if not doing so could constitute an "Omega Threat" situation. Under that provision, for example, a flower breeder who protects their variety in the Netherlands could block importation of cut flowers of that variety into the Netherlands from Egypt, which does not grant plant breeders' rights, because the breeder had no opportunity to exercise any rights in Egypt. Member countries also have the option to require the breeder's authorization with respect to the specified acts as applied to products directly obtained from the harvested material (such as flour or oil from grain, or juice from fruit), unless the breeder has had reasonable opportunity to exercise their right in relation to the harvested material.

The UPOV Convention also establishes a multilateral system of national treatment, under which citizens of any member state are treated as citizens of all member states for the purpose of obtaining plant breeders rights. It also sets up a multilateral priority filing system, under which an application for protection filed in one member state establishes a filing date for applications filed in all other member states within one year of that original filing date. This allows a breeder to file in any one member country within the one-year period required to preserve the novelty of their variety, and the novelty of the variety will still be recognized when the filing is done in other member countries within one year of the original filing date. However, if the applicant does not wish to make use of priority filing, he or she has four years in which to apply in all other member states, excepting the United States, for all species except tree and vine species in which case he or she has six years to make application. More information can be obtained in Article 10 (1) (b) of Council Regulation (EC) No. 2100/94 of 27 July 2004. The trigger to start the four- or six-year period is not actually the date on which the first filing is made but the date on which the variety was first commercialized.

The UPOV Convention is not self-executing. Each member state must adopt legislation consistent with the requirements of the convention and submit that legislation to the UPOV Secretariat for review and approval by the UPOV Council, which consists of all the UPOV member states acting in committee. In compliance with these treaty obligations, the United Kingdom enacted the Plant Variety and Seeds Act 1964. Similar legislation was passed in the Netherlands, Denmark, Germany, and New Zealand. In 1970 the United States followed the lead of seventeen Western European nations and passed the Plant Variety Protection Act 1970 (US). This legislation provided protection to developers of novel, sexually reproduced plants. However, the United States originally acceded to the UPOV Convention on the basis of the Plant Patent Act and did not bring the PVP Act into compliance with UPOV requirements until 1984 when the Commissioner of Plant Variety Protection promulgated rules to do so. Since the 1980s, the US Patent Office has granted patents on plants, including plant varieties this provides a second way of protecting plant varieties in the United States. Australia passed the Plant Variety Protection Act 1987 (Cth) and the Plant Breeders Rights Act 1994 (Cth). Australian patent law also permits the patenting of plant varieties. In total, 65 countries have signed the UPOV Convention and adopted plant breeders' rights legislation consistent with the requirements of the convention.

The WTO's Agreement on Trade-Related Aspects of Intellectual Property Rights (TRIPs) requires member states to provide protection for plant varieties either by patents or by an effective sui generis (stand alone) system, or a combination of the two. Most countries meet this requirement through UPOV Convention-compliant legislation. India has adopted a plant breeders' rights law that has been rejected by the UPOV Council as not meeting the requirements of the treaty.

The most recent 1991 UPOV convention established several restrictions upon international plant breeders' rights. While the current legislation of the convention recognizes novel varieties of plants as intellectual property, laws were formed concerning the preservation of seeds for future planting, such that the need to buy seeds to use in subsequent planting seasons would be significantly reduced, and even potentially eliminated altogether. In addition, the 1991 convention also concerns the method of investigating plant breeding by implementing pre-existing and patented plant species as contributors of vital genetic information in the creation of what would legally be regarded as a new variety of plant.

Constituent countries of the World Trade Organization are required to acknowledge the creation of new varieties of plants, and to uphold these creations within full recognition of intellectual property rights laws. A formalized legislature, exemplifying the manner in which such intellectual property rights can be conferred, is demonstrated by the 1991 UPOV convention, which declares such rights upon an individual breeder. This document further identifies a breeder as one who has found or created a plant variety, one who possesses legal authority for the contractual production of a new plant variety, or one who has inherited legal rights to this form of intellectual property as it was derived under either of the two aforementioned conditions.

As a result of debate over the protection of hybrid plants as new varieties, the legal measure of double protection, as expressed within the current iteration of the UPOV, can be taken. Double protection mediates the overlap between plant breeders' rights and patents that exists within the purview of intellectual property rights law, by enabling the protections of both to be conferred upon a particular plant variety.

Plant breeders' rights (sometimes referred to as breeders' privilege) are contentious, in particular when analyzed in balance with other relevant international legal instruments, such as the Convention on Biological Diversity (and its Nagoya Protocol) or the International Treaty on Plant Genetic Resources for Food and Agriculture (Plant Treaty). The UPOV is often criticized on this basis.

== Plants as intellectual property ==
There have been contrary opinions expressed by both lawyers and scientists assessing the general necessity for the protection of bred plant varieties as a form of intellectual property. Currently, intellectual property rights protect ideas that can be demonstrated as being novel and undiscovered at the time of its legal claim as intellectual property. This definition of novelty, however, has been flexible throughout the history of intellectual property law, both internationally, and within the United States. Expectations of future changes to the legal protection of plant-related forms of intellectual property differ from the legal requirements for the first plant patent. Proponents of these laws recognize an overarching need for the financial support of research and development. Agricultural research and development, for example, has been specified as a particularly demanding endeavor, with respect to immediate concerns for the ability to sustainably feed an increasing global population. On the contrary, some believe that a more diverse approach than the imposition of intellectual property rights laws upon new plant varieties is required. This counter argument asserts that complex social, cultural, and economic factors affect the nature of intellectual property and its protection. A specific concern within this argument is with the means by which seeds are accessed within different local and international regions. Recognizing that this process is extremely transient in nature and can vary greatly over time, supporters of this argument purport that this diversity must be reflected within intellectual property rights laws in order for them to exist as an effective protection of plant breeders' rights.

As a result of this conflict concerning authority over seeds, new legislation has been implemented in the United States. The Open Source Seed Initiative (OSSI) is a national attempt that has been introduced within the United States, and is the first of its kind to model its approach regarding plant breeders' rights upon the mechanisms implemented by openly sourced software mechanisms. Subsequent discourse on this approach has arisen, as concerns with the use of open source technology within a legal framework have developed. Some perceive OSSI as having significantly limited plant breeders' ability to access intellectual property rights for new plant varieties. This has resulted in claims that funding for research and development in this sector will also decline.

== By country ==
=== Africa ===
==== Ethiopia ====
The 2023 seed bill in Ethiopia provides the exception for farmers to reuse their own patented seeds as well as for small-scale farmers (defined as having less than 10 hectares of land and using their own or family labor) to exchange them for variety protection rights.

==== Ghana ====
The Ghana Plant Variety Protection Act provides a potential penalty of up to 15 years in prison for unlicensed seed planting. A limited exception is provided for farmers replanting their own legally purchased seeds.

==== Kenya ====
In 2025 the High Court of Kenya declared parts of the Seed and Plant Variety Act unconstitutional. The 2022 amendment imposed criminal penalties of up to two years for selling patented seeds without a permit.

==== Nigeria ====
In 2021 Nigeria passed the Plant Variety Protection Act imposing 20-25 year long rights for seeds. Limited exceptions are granted for non-commercial use of seeds.

=== Asia ===
==== India ====
The principal law dealing with seed protection is The Protection of Plant Varieties and Farmers’ Rights Act of 2001. Article 39 states that farmers have a right to save, use, sow, resow, exchange, share or sell their farm produce including seed of a variety protected under this Act as long as they don't use brand name.

In 2018 and 2019 American company PepsiCo sued nine family farmers in the Indian State of Gujarat for planting patented potato seeds with company's permission. The lawsuit was eventually withdrawn in May 2019. Activists tried to strip the company's seed patent but the Supreme Court of India upheld its validity in 2026. The court however acknowledged that farmers can use the article 39 protection in case of being sued again.

==== Indonesia ====
Indonesia has relatively strict seed patenting laws. The law has very narrow exception for farmers reusing seeds for non-commercial purposes, without the ability to share them with other farmers. As of 2016 NGOs have reported 14 cases of farmers being prosecuted and sentenced to up to six months in prison for unlicensed seed use.

==== Japan ====
Japanese law has no farmer exception to seed patents. Replanting seeds carries a potential sentence of up to ten years in prison.

==== Pakistan ====
In 2017 Pakistan passed its Plant Breeder Act. An exception is granted for farmers to save, use, sow, re-sow, exchange, share or sell their farm's produce but not to sell the patented seeds except as a part of exchange of propagating material among farmers according to regulations.

=== Europe ===
==== Spain ====
Spain is a country with on the highest numbers of seed-related lawsuits. Spain has fined, sentenced to jail, uprooted plantations, and destroyed the plants of the people that infringe intellectual property rights. Violating the patent can lead to a prison sentence from one to three years. In the 2017-2018 season The Enforcement Organization has filled 68 civil suits and 24 criminal action for unauthorized planting of Orri mandarin trees resulting in destruction of over 40,000 plants. Spain only allows farmers replanting of legally purchased seeds if the species is not synthetically engineered.

=== North America ===
==== Canada ====
The Supreme Court of Canada had issued a ruling for patent holders in Monsanto Canada Inc. v. Schmeiser (2004). That case concerned Percy Schmeiser, who claimed to have discovered that some canola growing on his farm in 1997 was Roundup resistant. Schmeiser harvested the seed from the Roundup resistant plants, and planted the seed in 1998. Monsanto sued Schmeiser for patent infringement for the 1998 planting. Schmeiser claimed that because the 1997 plants grew from seed that was pollinated with pollen blown into his field from neighboring fields, he owned the harvest and was entitled to do with it whatever he wished, including saving the seeds from the 1997 harvest and planting them in 1998. The initial Canadian Federal Court rejected Schmeiser's defense and held for Monsanto, finding that in 1998 Schmeiser had intentionally planted the seeds he had harvested from the wind-seeded crops in 1997, and so patent infringement had indeed occurred. Schmeiser appealed and lost again. Schmeiser appealed to the Supreme Court which took the case and held for Monsanto by a 5‑4 vote in late May 2004. Schmeiser won a partial victory, as the Supreme Court reversed on damages, finding that because Schmeiser did not gain any profit from the infringement, he did not owe Monsanto any damages nor did he have to pay Monsanto's substantial legal bills. The case caused Monsanto's enforcement tactics to be highlighted in the media over the years it took to play out. The case is widely cited or referenced by the anti-GM community in the context of a fear of a company claiming ownership of a farmer’s crop based on the inadvertent presence of GM pollen grain or seed. "The court record shows, however, that it was not just a few seeds from a passing truck, but that Mr Schmeiser was growing a crop of 95–98% pure Roundup Ready plants, a commercial level of purity far higher than one would expect from inadvertent or accidental presence. The judge could not account for how a few wayward seeds or pollen grains could come to dominate hundreds of acres without Mr Schmeiser’s active participation, saying ‘...none of the suggested sources could reasonably explain the concentration or extent of Roundup Ready canola of a commercial quality evident from the results of tests on Schmeiser’s crop’" – in other words, the original presence of Monsanto seed on his land in 1997 was indeed inadvertent, but the crop in 1998 was entirely purposeful.

==== Honduras ====
In 2022 the Supreme Court of Honduras ruled the 2012 seed law nicknamed "Monsanto Law" as unconstitutional. The law criminalized exchanging, saving or selling protected seeds.

==== United States ====
The case Bowman v. Monsanto Co. (2013) upheld patent seed rights. Itbegan in 2007, when Monsanto sued Indiana farmer Vernon Hugh Bowman who in 1999 bought seed for his second planting from a grain elevator – the same elevator to which he and others sold their transgenic crops. The elevator sold the soybeans as commodities, not as seeds for planting. Bowman tested the new seeds, and found that, as he had expected, some were resistant to glyphosate. He intentionally replanted his harvest of GM seeds in subsequent years, supplementing them with more soybeans he bought at the elevator. He informed Monsanto of his activities. Monsanto stated that he was infringing their patents because the soybeans he bought from the elevator were new products that he purchased for use as seeds without a license from Monsanto; Bowman stated that he had not infringed due to patent exhaustion on the first sale of seed to whatever farmers had produced the crops that he bought from the elevator, on the grounds that for seed, all future generations are embodied in the first generation that was originally sold. In 2009 the district court ruled in favor of Monsanto; on appeal, the Federal Circuit upheld the verdict. Bowman appealed to the United States Supreme Court, which granted review, then unanimously affirmed the Federal Circuit on May 13, 2013.

=== South America ===
==== Argentina ====
Since 1970s the government of Argentina has maintained the farmers rights to replant their own legally purchased seeds. In 2026 the government of Milei has pushed to require them to pay royalties to Monsanto by adhering to the UPOV 1991 convention.

==== Brazil ====
The Plant Variety Protection Act (1997) provides several exception to seed patents:

- Farmers can use seeds without a permission for personal use, except for sugarcane;
- Small farmers can replant licensed seeds or exchange them with other small farmers.

In 2019 the Supreme Court of Brazil ruled that farmers cannot replant the Roundup Ready soybeans licensed by Monsanto in a $7.7b lawsuit.

==== Ecuador ====
Ecuador law allows traditional farmers to utilize for personal use, exchange, or sell protected plant varieties as a part of traditional communities with exception of fruits, ornamentals and trees. The law also allows farmers to replant their licensed seeds as well as exchange them for replanting with other farmers.

==== Venezuela ====
The 2015 seed law in Venezuela explicitly prohibits the patenting of seeds.

== Seed sovereignty ==
Seed sovereignty can be defined as the right "to breed and exchange diverse open-sourced seeds". Generally, it comes from the belief that communities should have control over their own seed stock, as a means to increase agricultural biodiversity, resilience, and food security. This idea is closely connected to issues of intellectual property rights, particularly related to the patenting of plant genetics, due to the importance of seed saving in seed sovereignty. Activists argue that farmers and individuals should have legal protection for the practice for maintaining traditional plant varieties. Seed sovereignty activists also argue that seed saving should be protected on the grounds of environmentalism and food security. Some activists argue that seed sovereignty is important because of the cultural value of certain seeds and plant varieties, especially among indigenous communities. Seed sovereignty has strong ties to the food justice and food sovereignty movements, due to its focus on increasing food security for all communities.

== See also ==
- Plant breeding
- Plant genetic resources
- Biodiversity
- Biopiracy / Bioprospecting
- Germplasm
- Seedbank
- Access and Benefit Sharing Agreement
- Farmers' rights / Peasants' rights
- Convention on Biological Diversity and Nagoya Protocol to the Convention on Biological Diversity
- UPOV Convention on New Varieties of Plants
- United Nations Declaration on the Rights of Peasants
- International Treaty on Plant Genetic Resources for Food and Agriculture (Plant Treaty)
- World Intellectual Property Organization
- Genetic resources (disambiguation)
- Community Plant Variety Office (CPVO)
- National laws (Plant Patent Act of 1930, Plant Variety Protection Act - USA; Protection of Plant Varieties and Farmers' Rights Act, 2001 - India)
