= Frank Morton (plant breeder) =

American farmer

Frank H. Morton (born 1955 in Fayette County, West Virginia) is an organic farmer, gardener, plant breeder and seedsman known for creating dozens of varieties of lettuce.

With his wife Karen, he founded the company Wild Garden Seed in 1994, and he was a founding member of the Open Source Seed Initiative in 2012.

== Biography ==
Morton's first foray into gardening was brought about by his father, a coal miner who grew prizewinning delphiniums as a hobby, and his mother, who inspired the 5-year-old Frank to try planting the seeds from the watermelons he ate in an (ultimately unsuccessful) attempt to get more watermelon. Growing up in West Virginia, he moved to Oregon in the 1970s to attend Lewis & Clark College, graduating with a BS in Child Psychology in 1978.

Morton began growing lettuce commercially in the early 1980s, letting some of the crop go to seed and planting those seeds the next year. Cross-pollination between two varieties led to formation of a novel hybrid with a combination of characteristics from the parent plants. Planting the seeds from that lettuce resulted in a number of different plants with a wide variety of features, from which 23 new varieties of lettuce were eventually selected. More recently, Morton has been selecting lettuce varieties for resistance to common diseases such as downy mildew.

== Famous cultivars ==
Morton has bred at least 99 types of lettuce, and his company, Wild Garden Seed, offered seed for 114 lettuce varieties in 2016.

On August 10, 2015, 'Outredgeous', a red romaine lettuce bred by Morton in the 1990s, became the first plant variety to be planted, harvested and eaten entirely in space, as a part of Expedition 44 to the International Space Station.

In addition to lettuce, Morton has also grown and bred other types of vegetables, including beets, peppers, kale, and quinoa.
