= Plant Variety Protection Act of 1970 =

- Long title: An act to encourage the development of novel varieties of sexually reproduced plants and to make them available to the public, providing protection available to those who breed, develop, or discover them, and thereby promoting progress in agriculture in the public interest.
- Acronyms (colloquial): PVPA
- Enacted by: the 91st United States Congress
- Effective: December 24, 1970

Citations
- Public law: Pub. L. 91–577

Codification
- U.S.C. sections created: 7 U.S.C. §§ 2321–2582

Legislative history
- Introduced in the United States Senate as S. 3070 by Walter Mondale D‑MN on October 23, 1969; Committee consideration by Agriculture and Forestry, Judiciary, Agriculture; Passed the Senate on October 2, 1970; Passed the House on December 8, 1970

The Plant Variety Protection Act of 1970 (PVPA), 7 U.S.C. §§ 2321-2582, is an intellectual property statute in the United States. The PVPA gives breeders up to 25 years of exclusive control over new, distinct, uniform, and stable sexually reproduced or tuber-propagated plant varieties. A major expression of plant breeders' rights in the United States, the PVPA grants protection similar to that available through patents, but these legal schemes differ in critical respects. The PVPA should not be confused with plant patents, which are limited to asexually reproduced plants (not including tuber-propagated plants).

== Basic provisions ==
The PVPA confers a limited period of legal control to breeders of sexually reproduced or tuber propagated plant varieties. In order to be eligible for a certificate under the PVPA, a plant variety must satisfy four requirements. First, it must be new, in the sense that propagating or harvested material has not been sold or otherwise disposed of for purposes of exploitation for more than one year in the United States, or more than four years in any foreign jurisdiction (or six years in the case of a tree or vine). Second, the variety must be distinct—that is, clearly distinguishable from any other publicly known variety. Distinctness may be based on one or more identifiable morphological, physiological, or other characteristics, including commercially valuable characteristics affecting activities such as milling and baking (in the case of wheat). Third, the variety must be uniform, in the sense that any variations are describable, predictable, and commercially acceptable. Finally, the variety must be stable, in the sense that the variety, when reproduced, will remain unchanged with regard to its essential and distinctive characteristics within a reasonable degree of commercial reliability.

A plant variety certificate gives the breeder the right to exclude others from selling the variety, or offering it for sale, or reproducing it, or importing it, or exporting it, or using it in producing (as distinguished from developing) a hybrid or different variety. The term of protection runs 20 years from the certificate's date of issue, or 25 years in the case of a tree or vine.

== Exemptions ==
Unlike the Patent Act of 1952, the PVPA contains three exemptions that significantly limit the scope of the plant breeder's exclusive right. First, the PVPA's provision safeguarding the "public interest in wide usage" allows the United States Department of Agriculture to declare an otherwise protected variety open on the basis of equitable remuneration to the owner, upon a finding that no more than two years of compulsory licensing of a protected variety is necessary in order to insure an adequate supply of fiber, food, or feed and that the owner is unwilling or unable to meet public demand at a price which may reasonably be deemed fair. Second, the PVPA's "research exemption" declares that the use and reproduction of a protected variety for plant breeding or other bona fide research shall not constitute infringement.

The PVPA's third exemption permits a farmer to save seed from protected varieties and to use such saved seed in the production of a crop without infringement. Prior to 1994, this exemption also allowed farmers to sell such saved seed to others without infringement. Asgrow Seed Company sued Denny and Becky Winterboer over the scope of this exemption. Asgrow won at District Court, and then lost at the Court of Appeals. The scope of the exemption to sell seeds was confirmed and defined by the 1995 Supreme Court decision in Asgrow Seed Co. v. Winterboer, 513 U.S. 179 (1995). In 1994, legislation to bring the PVPA into compliance with the 1991 Act of the UPOV Convention also included amendments that eliminated the exemption for sales, but continued to allow farmers to save and replant seed on their own farms without infringement.

== Contrasting plant variety certificates, plant patents, and utility patents ==
Plant variety certificates should not be confused with plant patents. The Plant Variety Protection Act (PVPA) and the Plant Patent Act of 1930 provide protection based on different types of plant reproductive strategies. The PVPA, which authorizes plant variety protection certificates, protects sexually reproduced and tuber propagated plants, whereas the Plant Patent Act, which authorizes plant patents, is limited to asexually reproduced plants, excluding tuber propagated plants. However, the same plant may be protected under both the Plant Variety Protection Act and the Plant Patent Act of 1930. The most appropriate means of protection may be decided by the applicant based on the applicant's business requirements.

A plant may also be eligible for protection under the Patent Act of 1952, as long as patentability requirements are met. Additionally, the same plant may be protected by a utility patent as well as a plant variety protection certificate and/or a plant patent. The landmark Supreme Court decision of Diamond v. Chakrabarty, 447 U.S. 303 (1980), suggested the possibility of securing utility patents on plants previously thought eligible solely for protection under the PVPA. Two decades later, in the 2001 decision of J. E. M. Ag Supply, Inc. v. Pioneer Hi-Bred International, Inc., 534 U.S. 124 (2001), the Court conclusively held that sexually reproduced plants eligible for protection under the PVPA are also eligible for utility patents.

== The PVPA and international law ==
The Plant Variety Protection Act represents the United States' effort to comply with the Union pour la Protection des Obtentions Végétales (also known as UPOV or the International Union for the Protection of New Varieties of Plants), an international treaty concerning plant breeders' rights. The PVPA likewise constitutes part of the United States' compliance with the Trade Related Aspects of Intellectual Property Rights annex of the World Trade Organization treaty, also known as TRIPs.

== See also ==
- Intellectual property
- Patents
- Plant breeders' rights
- Plant Patent Act of 1930
- International Union for the Protection of New Varieties of Plants (UPOV)
- Trade Related Aspects of Intellectual Property Rights (TRIPs)
- List of United States federal legislation
