= Bowman v. Monsanto Co. =

- Supreme Court of the United States

Argued February 19, 2013 Decided May 13, 2013
- Full case name: Vernon Hugh Bowman v. Monsanto Company, et al.
- Docket no.: 11-796
- Citations: 569 U.S. 278 (more) 133 S. Ct. 1761; 185 L. Ed. 2d 931; 2013 U.S. LEXIS 3519; 81 USLW 4295; 106 U.S.P.Q.2d 1593; 13 Cal. Daily Op. Serv. 4720; 2013 Daily Journal D.A.R. 6041; 24 Fla. L. Weekly Fed. S 179

Case history
- Prior: 686 F. Supp. 2d 834 (S.D. Ind. 2009); 657 F.3d 1341 (Fed. Cir. 2011); cert. granted, 568 U.S. 936 (2012).
- Subsequent: Rehearing denied, 570 U.S. 936 (2013).

Holding
- Patent exhaustion does not permit a farmer to reproduce patented seeds through planting and harvesting without the patent holder's permission.

Court membership
- Chief Justice John Roberts Associate Justices Antonin Scalia · Anthony Kennedy; Clarence Thomas · Ruth Bader Ginsburg; Stephen Breyer · Samuel Alito; Sonia Sotomayor · Elena Kagan

Case opinion
- Majority: Kagan, joined by unanimous

Laws applied
- 35 U.S.C. § 271(a)

Bowman v. Monsanto Co., 569 U.S. 278 (2013), was a United States Supreme Court patent decision in which the Court unanimously affirmed the decision of the Federal Circuit that the patent exhaustion doctrine does not permit a farmer to plant and grow saved, patented seeds without the patent owner's permission. The case arose after Vernon Hugh Bowman, an Indiana farmer, bought transgenic soybean crop seeds from a local grain elevator for his second crop of the season. Monsanto originally sold the seed from which these soybeans were grown to farmers under a limited use license that prohibited the farmer-buyer from using the seeds for more than a single season or from saving any seed produced from the crop for replanting. The farmers sold their soybean crops (also seeds) to the local grain elevator, from which Bowman then bought them. After Bowman replanted the crop seeds for his second harvest, Monsanto filed a lawsuit claiming that he infringed on their patents by replanting soybeans without a license. In response, Bowman argued that Monsanto's claims were barred under the doctrine of patent exhaustion, because all future generations of soybeans were embodied in the first generation that was originally sold.

In a unanimous opinion written by Justice Elena Kagan, the Supreme Court ruled that Bowman's conduct infringed Monsanto's patents and that the doctrine of patent exhaustion does not permit a farmer to reproduce patented seeds by planting and harvesting saved crop seeds without the patent holder's permission. The Court held that, when a farmer plants a harvested and saved seed, thereby growing another soybean crop, that action constitutes an unauthorized "making" of the patented product.

The case garnered attention in part due to its potential impact on policy about genetically modified crops and self-replicating technologies, and due to the involvement of Justice Clarence Thomas, who previously served as a lawyer for Monsanto. Commentators noted, however, that the Court's ruling was narrow in scope, and did not set a broad legal precedent with respect to the applicability of the doctrine of patent exhaustion to self-replicating technologies.

== Background ==
=== Factual setting ===
Monsanto developed patents for genetically modified soybeans that were resistant to glyphosate-based herbicides. When farmers sprayed the modified soybeans with the glyphosate herbicide Roundup, the modified soybeans would survive while competing plants (weeds) would be killed. Monsanto sold these soybeans under a limited-use license that prohibited the farmer-buyer from using the seeds for more than a single season or from saving any seed produced from the crop for replanting.

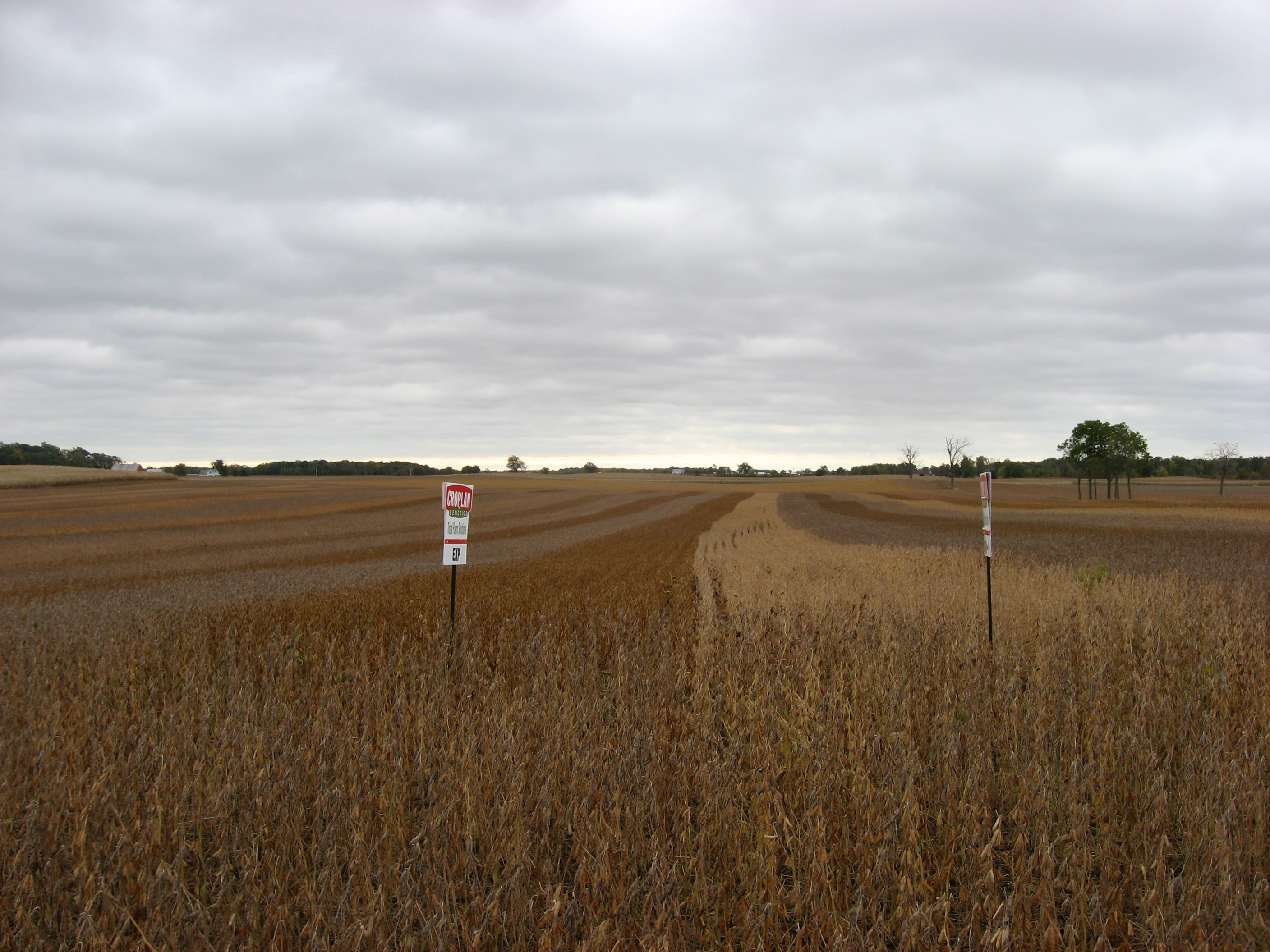
Different types of genetically modified soybeans being grown side by side

In 1999, Indiana farmer Vernon Hugh Bowman bought soybean crop seeds from a local grain elevator for his second crop of the season. He then saved seeds from his second crop to replant additional crops in later years. Bowman purchased these soybean seeds from the same elevator to which he and neighbors sold their soybean crops, many of which were transgenic, and the elevator sold these soybeans as commodities, not as seeds for planting. He tested the new seeds, and found that, as he had expected, some were transgenic and thus were resistant to glyphosate. He replanted seeds from the original second harvest in subsequent years for his second seasonal planting, supplementing them with more soybeans he bought at the elevator. He informed Monsanto of his activities.

Monsanto stated that he was infringing its patents because the soybeans he bought from the elevator were products that he purchased for use as seeds without a license from Monsanto; Bowman stated that he had not infringed due to patent exhaustion on the first sale of seed to whatever farmers had produced the crops that he bought from the elevator, on the grounds that for seed, all future generations are embodied in the first generation that was originally sold. Bowman had previously purchased and planted Monsanto seeds under a license agreement promising not to save seeds from the resulting crop, but that agreement was not relevant to his purchase of soybean seed from the grain elevator nor to the litigation. In 2007, Monsanto sued Bowman for patent infringement in the United States District Court for the Southern District of Indiana.

=== Lower court rulings ===
After filing suit, Monsanto moved for summary judgment. In response, Bowman argued that if Monsanto was allowed to continue its license past exhaustion, it would be able to dominate the market. Although the district court found Bowman's arguments compelling, it found that it was bound by previous appellate court decisions in Monsanto Co. v. Scruggs and Monsanto Co. v. McFarling to control, and in 2009, the district court ruled in favor of Monsanto. The court held that since the original farmers could not use the later generation seeds without a license, they could not make an unrestricted sale and therefore the patent rights were not exhausted. The court entered judgment for Monsanto in the amount of $84,456.30 and enjoined Bowman from making, using, selling or offering to sell any of the seeds from Monsanto's patent.

Bowman then appealed the decision to the United States Court of Appeals for the Federal Circuit. Bowman argued that the Monsanto license agreement allowed the sale of second-generation soybeans to both grain elevators and subsequent buyers and that this caused the patent rights to be exhausted per the United States Supreme Court's ruling in Quanta Computer, Inc. v. LG Electronics, Inc. Monsanto argued that the license agreement specifically prohibited the use of second-generation seeds for planting. The Federal Circuit upheld the lower court's decision in favor of Monsanto.

=== Petition to the Supreme Court ===
Bowman sought review in the United States Supreme Court. Bowman argued that the Federal Circuit's decision conflicted with existing Supreme Court precedent on patent exhaustion. Bowman said that United States v. Univis Lens Co. showed that patent exhaustion applied even when the patent holder created post-sale restrictions. He claimed that the Federal Circuit had created a judicial exception to patent exhaustion for Monsanto, allowing it to dominate the soybean seed market. Finally, Bowman argued that he was not "making" infringing new seeds merely by planting and reaping crops.

Monsanto argued that the Federal Circuit's decision was correct because Bowman had created a new product that infringed on their patent. They further argued that this was not an appropriate case to hear, as the decision was not decided on patent exhaustion via a conditional sale. The Supreme Court requested the United States to brief the Court, and the Solicitor General filed a brief generally in support of the Monsanto position. The United States asked the Court to deny certiorari. The Supreme Court granted certiorari on October 5, 2012.

== Supreme Court ==
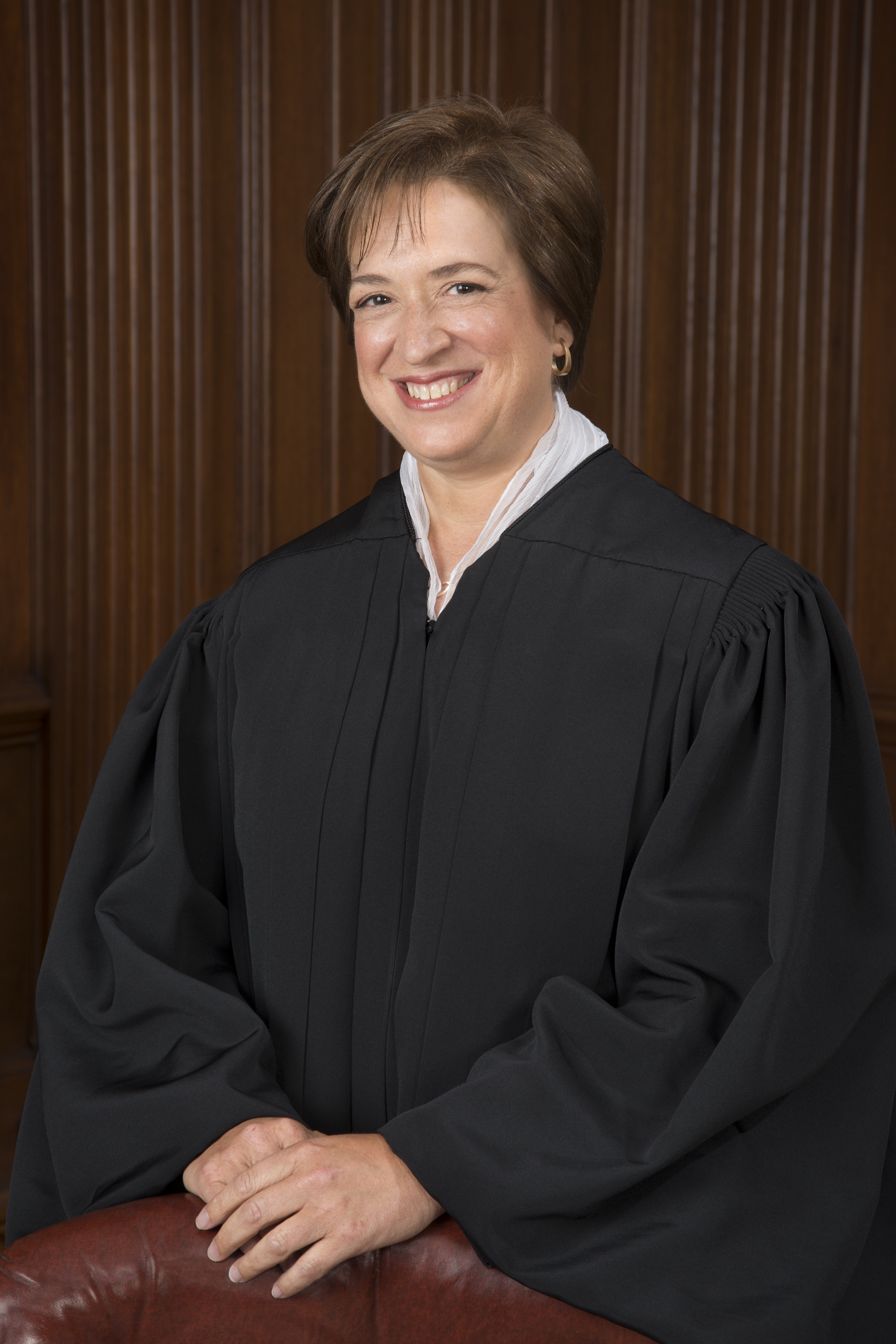
Justice Elena Kagan delivered the opinion of the Court

=== Arguments ===
Bowman argued that the authorized sale of the seeds extinguished the patent, and that Bowman merely used seeds legitimately purchased from the silo. He claimed that the Federal Circuit had created an exception to the exhaustion doctrine, and that this decision was properly for Congress to decide. Monsanto argued that the second-generation seeds were not subject to exhaustion because they had not existed until Bowman created them and had not been sold at the time of infringement. He noted that even when exhaustion applied, it did not allow one to create new copies of the patented product, which the second-generation seeds were.

A number of Amici Curiae also filed briefs on behalf of the parties. For example, the American Intellectual Property Law Association, arguing on behalf of Monsanto, wrote that "[e]xhaustion of the right to control propagation of patented seed would disrupt the balance created by Congress between the Patent Act and the Plant Variety Protection Act." The American Seed Trade Association, also arguing on behalf of Monsanto, wrote that "[p]atented seed technology benefits farmers, consumers and the environment". The National Farmers Union, arguing on behalf of Bowman, wrote that "[a] patent exhaustion exception for self-replicating technologies is inconsistent with this Court’s precedent and the competition policies reflected in the first-sale doctrine", and the Center for Food Safety wrote that "[f]arming is not genetic engineering".

=== Commentary prior to the Supreme Court's ruling ===
In the months leading up to the decision, commentators weighed in on several issues relating to the case. Because Justice Clarence Thomas had served as a lawyer for the Monsanto Company 34 years earlier, some critics questioned whether he would remain impartial. Other commentators noted that the case raised the "important question" of whether the exhaustion doctrine should include an exception for self-replicating technologies, which may one day include self-replicating robots. In SCOTUSblog, Ronald Mann wrote the case's "practical ramifications are substantial", and that the case was "one of the highest-stakes cases of the Term". However, Mann also predicted that "it seems most unlikely the Court will rule against Monsanto", and in his coverage of the case's oral arguments, he observed that "none of the Justices expressed any sympathy for [Bowman’s] position".

=== Opinion of the Court ===
On May 13, 2013, Justice Elena Kagan delivered the Court's unanimous opinion, which affirmed the judgment of the Federal Circuit. Justice Kagan stated that while an authorized sale of a patented item terminates all patent rights to that item, that exhaustion does not permit a farmer to reproduce patented seeds through planting and harvesting without the patent holder's permission. Justice Kagan stated that when a farmer plants a harvested and saved seed, thereby growing a further soybean crop, that action constitutes an unauthorized "making" of the patented product, in violation of section 271(a) of the patent code. Justice Kagan concluded that Bowman could resell the patented seeds he obtained from the elevator, or use them as feed, but that he could not produce additional seeds (that is, crops).

== Commentary and analysis ==
After the Court published its decision, analysts offered a range of opinions about the impact of the Court's ruling. An academic co-author of an amicus brief on behalf of Bowman filed by the American Antitrust Institute expressed relief that the loss was on a narrow basis rather than providing a broad affirmation of the lack of patent exhaustion for self-replicating technologies. Kevin Rodkey argued that an analysis under Quanta Computer leads to the conclusion that patent rights covering self-replicating seeds are exhausted on the first authorized sale, including subsequent generations, and that seed companies can only exclude subsequent replantings with carefully written license restrictions. Ronald Mann writing in SCOTUSblog noted: "The tenor of the Court came through most clearly when the Court ridiculed what it called Bowman’s 'blame-the-bean defense' – the argument that Bowman did not make new seeds, because it was the seeds themselves that replicated."

Another academic, Richard H. Stern, did not take issue with the Court's refusal to shelter Bowman's conduct under the exhaustion doctrine, but criticized the Court's classification of the act of planting seeds and growing crops from them as an act of "making" a new patented article. Rochelle C. Dreyfus is also reported to have criticized the decision, noting that Bowman was attempting to obtain the benefit of the genetic modifications, while others, such as organic growers, fear being sued for inadvertent cross-contamination. Additionally, the Harvard Law Review wrote that "[t]he Court reached the correct outcome but via the wrong route" because its ruling "obfuscates the role of the licensing agreement" and because the "exhaustion doctrine is ill suited to address the challenges posed by self-replicating technologies".

Other commentators suggested the case will have broad-ranging impacts for other self-replicating technologies. Tabetha Marie Peavey suggested that the Court "appeared to be alert to the consequences of its ruling, not just for the value of Monsanto’s soybean patents, but also for technologies like cell lines, software, and vaccines". Likewise, Christopher M. Holman wrote that the case "should be viewed as a bellwether for an oncoming wave of controversy around the patenting of self-replicating technologies that will challenge the ability of the patent system to respond effectively". William J. Simmons also wrote that "more cases like this will probably be appealed to [the Supreme Court] as these technologies become more prevalent in society".

== Subsequent developments ==
In a similar case, Organic Seed Growers & Trade Ass'n v. Monsanto Co., a coalition of farmers filed suit to challenge twenty-three of Monsanto's patents for glyphosate-resistant crops. The plaintiffs argued that if their crops became "contaminated by transgenic seed, which may very well be inevitable given the proliferation of transgenic seed today, they could quite perversely also be accused of patent infringement". The plaintiffs sued to declare Monsanto's patents invalid and asked Monsanto to "expressly waive any claim for patent infringement [Monsanto] may ever have" against the farmers and to "memorialize that waiver by providing a written covenant not to sue". However, the case was dismissed for lack of a controversy. The suit did not demonstrate instances of current harm or future risk. Monsanto also gave assurances that it did not plan to sue in cases of inadvertent infringement when a grower was not also using glyphosate on their crop. Monsanto's patent for the soybeans at issue in this case expired in 2014, prior to which Monsanto announced that it will no longer enforce the licenses associated with the soybeans.
