= Richard H. Stern =

American lawyer

- Born: September 9, 1931 (age 94); New York City, New York, U.S.
- Education: Columbia University (BA); Yale University (LLB)
- Occupation: Lawyer

Richard Harvey Stern (born September 9, 1931) is an American attorney and law professor.

== Biography ==
Born in New York City, Stern received an A.B. cum laude from Columbia College in 1953 and a B.S. in electrical engineering from Columbia University School of Engineering in 1954. He served in the U.S. Army from 1955 to 1956, and then returned to civilian life and earned an LL.B. at Yale Law School, studying under and acting as teaching assistant for Professor Friedrich Kessler and graduating cum laude and Order of the Coif, in 1959.

He served as a law clerk for Justice Byron White at the United States Supreme Court from 1962 to 1963. Thereafter Stern worked at the Department of Justice in the Antitrust Division. He was chief of the Patent Section and then the Intellectual Property Section in the Antitrust Division of the U.S. Department of Justice from 1970 to 1978. Among the Supreme Court cases in which he was counsel for the Government were Aro Mfg. Co. v. Convertible Top Replacement Co., Federal Trade Commission v. Dean Foods Company, Lear, Inc. v. Adkins, FTC v. Sperry & Hutchinson Co., Gottschalk v. Benson, and Parker v. Flook.

Stern was a distinguished visiting professor of law at the University of Minnesota Law School in 1974. He is the author of Semiconductor Chip Protection and articles on antitrust, the exhaustion doctrine, computer software, patent, and copyright law. Since 1982 he has been legal editor and a member of the board of editors of IEEE Micro, a magazine published by the IEEE Computer Society, and author of the magazine's Micro Law column, and has written a number of articles in that publication concerning antitrust law, computer software-related law, and legal issues relating to standardization. Stern believed that Computer Software Copyright Act of 1980 and other uses of the intellectual property clause was inadequate for software, and advocated for legislation based on the Commerce Clause. One author noted Stern's "analytical optimism for technological advances in noncoded aspects of computer programs, and recombinant DNA technology". Stern has also been a professorial lecturer in law at The George Washington University Law School, 1990–present, where he teaches patent and copyright law, with a focus on the eligibility of business methods and software-related inventions for patent grants.

He has also served as an official at the U.S. Department of Commerce and at the Federal Trade Commission, and was of counsel at Kellogg, Hansen, Todd, Figel & Frederick, P.L.L.C., in Washington D.C.

== See also ==
- List of law clerks for the sixth seat of the Supreme Court of the United States
