= Outline of patents =

Overview of and topical guide to patents

The following outline is provided as an overview of and topical guide to patents:

Patent – set of exclusive rights granted by a sovereign state to an inventor or assignee for a limited period of time in exchange for detailed public disclosure of an invention. An invention is a solution to a specific technological problem and is a product or a process. Patents are a form of intellectual property.

== What type of thing is a patent? ==
A patent can be described as all of the following:

- Property – one or more components (rather than attributes), whether physical or incorporeal, of a person's estate; or so belonging to, as in being owned by, a person or jointly a group of people or a legal entity like a corporation or even a society.
  - Intellectual property – intangible assets such as musical, literary, and artistic works; discoveries and inventions; and words, phrases, symbols, and designs.

== Types of patents ==
- Biological patent – the scope and reach of biological patents vary among jurisdictions, and may include biological technology and products, genetically modified organisms and genetic material. The applicability of patents to substances and processes wholly or partially natural in origin is a subject of debate.
- Business method patent – includes patents on new types of e-commerce; and on methods of doing business in insurance, banking, tax compliance, etc. A business method may be defined as "a method of operating any aspect of an economic enterprise".
  - Tax patent – discloses and claims a system or method for reducing or deferring taxes. In September 2011, President Barack Obama signed legislation passed by the U.S. Congress that effectively prohibits the granting of tax patents in general.
- Chemical patent – patent for an invention in the chemical or pharmaceuticals industry. Not a special legal form of patent.
- Design patent –
- Essential patent –
- Insurance patent –
- Medical patent –
- Software patent –
- Submarine patent –

== Patent process ==
- Patent application – request pending at a patent office for the grant of a patent for the invention described and claimed by that application. An application consists of a description of the invention (the patent specification), together with official forms and correspondence relating to the application.
  - Divisional patent application – type of patent application which contains matter from a previously filed application (the so-called parent application). Whilst a divisional application is filed later than the parent application, it may retain its parent's filing date, and will generally claim the same priority.
  - Patent drawing – drawing in a patent application that illustrates the invention, or some of its embodiments (which are particular implementations or methods of carrying out the invention), or the prior art. Drawings may be required by law to be in a particular form, and the requirements may vary depending on the jurisdiction.
- Patent prosecution – interaction between applicants and their representatives, and a patent office with regard to a patent, or an application for a patent. Broadly, patent prosecution can be split into pre-grant prosecution, which involves negotiation with a patent office for the grant of a patent, and post-grant prosecution, which involves issues such as post-grant amendment and opposition.
  - Public participation in patent examination – used in some forms to help identifying relevant prior art and, more generally, to help assessing whether patent applications and inventions meet the requirements of patent law, such as novelty, inventive step or non-obviousness, and sufficiency of disclosure.
- Patent term adjustment – process of extending the term of a US patent. Its intention is to accommodate for delays caused by the US patent office during the Prosecution of a US patent application. The total PTA is an addition to the 20-year lifespan of a US patent.

== History of patents ==
- History of patent law – generally considered to have started with the Venetian Statute of 1474 and the 1624 English Statute of Monopolies.
  - History of United States patent law – this started even before the U.S. Constitution was adopted, with some state-specific patent laws. The history spans over more than three centuries.
    - Patent caveat – was a legal document filed with the United States Patent Office. Caveats were instituted by the U.S. Patent Act of 1836, but were discontinued in 1909, with the U.S. Congress abolishing the system formally in 1910.
- Patent model – was a scratch-built miniature model no larger than 12" by 12" by 12" (approximately 30 cm by 30 cm by 30 cm) that showed how an invention works. It was one of the most interesting early features of the United States patent system.
- 1836 U.S. Patent Office fire – second of several disastrous fires in the history of the U.S. Patent Office. Its cause was ultimately determined to be accidental. Many patent documents and models from the preceding three decades were irretrievably lost. As a result of the fire, Congress and the newly legally revamped Patent Office changed the way it handled its recordkeeping, assigning numbers to patents and requiring multiple copies of supporting documentation.
  - X-Patents – all the patents issued by the United States Patent and Trademark Office from July 1790 (when the first U.S. patent was issued), to July 1836. The actual number is unknown, but the best estimate is 9,957. The records were burned in a fire, in December 1836, while in temporary storage. No copies or rosters were maintained by the government at the time, leaving only the inventors’ copies to reconstruct the collection.
- Confederate Patent Office – agency of the Confederate States of America charged with issuing patents on inventions. is known to have issued 266 patents, and likely it issued some more during the early months of 1865. Unfortunately, the records it contained were destroyed in a fire. Very few patent documents issued by the CPO, likely fewer than 10, are known to survive.
- 1877 U.S. Patent Office fire – second of several disastrous fires in the history of the U.S. Patent Office. It occurred in the Old Patent Office Building in Washington, D.C., on 27 September 1877. Although the building was constructed to be fireproof, many of its contents were not; some 80,000 models and some 600,000 copy drawings were destroyed. No patents were completely lost, however, and the Patent Office soon reopened.
- Wright brothers patent war – the Wrights' preoccupation with suing infringers and collecting license fees hindered their development of new aircraft designs, and by 1910 Wright aircraft were inferior to those made by other firms in Europe. Aviation development in the U.S. was suppressed to such an extent that when the country entered World War I no acceptable American-designed aircraft were available, and U.S. forces were compelled to use French machines.
- Smartphone patent wars – since 2009, ongoing business battle by smartphone manufacturers including Sony, Google, Apple Inc., Samsung, Microsoft, Nokia, Motorola, Xiaomi, and HTC, among others, in patent litigation. The conflict is part of the wider "patent wars" between multinational technology and software corporations.* State Committee on Standardization, Metrology and Patents (Azerbaijan) –

== Patent theory ==
- Economics and patents – Patents are an incentive system designed to encourage innovation. By conferring rights on the owner to exclude competitors from the market (and thus providing a higher probability of financial rewards in the market place), patents offer the incentive for people to study and create new technology.
- Prizes as an alternative to patents – Some authors advocating patent reform have proposed the use of prizes as an alternative to patents. Critics of the current patent system, such as Joseph E. Stiglitz, are critical of patents because they fail to provide incentives for innovations which are not commercially marketable.

== Patent-related business concepts ==
- Patent cliff – phenomena of patent expiration dates and an abrupt drop in sales that follows for a group of products capturing high percentage of a market. Usually, these phenomena are noticed when they affect blockbuster products. A blockbuster product in the pharmaceutical industry, for example, is defined as a product with sales exceeding US$1 billion per year.
- Patent family – patents for a single invention in multiple countries.
  - Triadic patent – series of corresponding patents filed at the European Patent Office (EPO), the United States Patent and Trademark Office (USPTO) and the Japan Patent Office (JPO), for the same invention, by the same applicant or inventor. Triadic patents form a special type of patent family.
- Patent holding company – company that holds patents on behalf of one or more other companies but does not necessarily manufacture products or supply services based upon the patents held.
- Patent portfolio – collection of patents owned by a single entity, such as an individual or corporation. The patents may be related or unrelated. Patent applications may also be regarded as included in a patent portfolio.

=== Patent-related business strategies and techniques ===
- Patent ambush – when a member of a standard-setting organization withholds information, during participation in development and setting a standard, about a patent that the member or the member's company owns, has pending, or intends to file, which is relevant to the standard, and subsequently the company asserts that a patent is infringed by use of the standard as adopted.
- Defensive patent aggregation – practice of purchasing patents or patent rights to keep such patents out of the hands of entities that would assert them against operating companies.
- Evergreening – variety of legal and business strategies by which technology producers with patents over products that are about to expire retain royalties from them, by either taking out new patents (for example over associated delivery systems, or new pharmaceutical mixtures), or by buying out or frustrating competitors, for longer periods of time than would normally be permissible under the law.
- Patent monetization – generation of revenue or the attempt to generate revenue by a person or company by selling or licensing the patents it owns.
- Offensive patent aggregation – purchasing of patents in order to assert them against companies that would use the inventions protected by such patents (operating companies) and to grant licenses to these operating companies in return for licensing fees or royalties.
- Open patent – patented invention that can freely be distributed under a copyleft-like license. The invention could be used as is, or improved, in which case the patent improvement would have to be re-licensed to the institution that holds the original patent, and from which the original work was licensed.
- Patent pooling – forming a consortium of at least two companies who agree to cross-license patents relating to a particular technology. The creation of a patent pool can save patentees and licensees time and money, and, in case of blocking patents, it may also be the only reasonable method for making an invention available to the public.
- Patent privateering – when a party, typically a patent assertion entity, authorized by another party, often a technology corporation, uses intellectual property to attack other operating companies. Privateering provides a way for companies to assert intellectual property against their competitors with a significantly reduced risk of retaliation and as a means for altering their competitive landscape.
- Patent troll – person or company who enforces patent rights against accused infringers in an attempt to collect licensing fees, but does not manufacture products or supply services based upon the patents in question, thus engaging in economic rent-seeking.
- Patent visualisation – application of information visualisation. The number of patents has been increasing steadily, thus forcing companies to consider intellectual property as a part of their strategy. So patent visualisation like patent mapping is used to quickly view patent portfolios.
  - Patent mapping – graphical modeling used in patent visualisation. This practice "enables companies to identify the patents in a particular technology space, verify the characteristics of these patents, and ... identify the relationships among them, to see if there are any zones of infringement." Patent mapping is also referred to as patent landscaping.
- Patent war – "battle" between corporations or individuals to secure patents for litigation, whether offensively or defensively. There are ongoing patent wars between the world's largest technology and software corporations. Contemporary patent wars are a global phenomenon, fought by multinational corporations based in the United States, China, Europe, Japan, Korea and Taiwan.
- Patent watch – process for monitoring newly issued patents, as well as possibly pending patent applications, to assess whether any of these patent rights might be of interest or might be annoying.

== Patent law ==
- Double patenting –
- Glossary of patent law terms –
- Large and small entities in patent law –
- Patentability – meeting the relevant legal conditions to be granted a patent. By extension, patentability also refers to the substantive conditions that must be met for a patent to be held valid.
  - Patentable subject matter –
  - Novelty –
    - Novelty under the European Patent Convention –
  - Inventive step or non-obviousness –
    - Inventive step under the European Patent Convention –
    - Non-obviousness in United States patent law –
  - Industrial applicability –
  - Utility –
  - Sufficiency of disclosure –
- Patent case law –
- Patent claim types –
- Patent infringement –
  - Enforcement of European patents –
  - Patent infringement in Canadian law –
  - Patent infringement under United Kingdom law –
  - Patent infringement under United States law –
- Patent law cases, United States –
- Software patent law
  - Software patent debate –
  - Software patents and free software –
  - Software patents under the European Patent Convention –
  - Software patents under TRIPs Agreement –
- Sufficiency of disclosure –
  - Disclosure of the invention under the European Patent Convention –
- Term of patent –
  - Term of patent in the United States –
- Unity of invention –
  - Unity of invention under the European Patent Convention –

=== Patent courts ===
- Patent court –
- 2014 Danish Unified Patent Court membership referendum –
- Federal Patent Court –
- Federal Patent Court of Germany –
- Federal Patent Court of Switzerland –
- Patents Court –
- Unified Patent Court –
- United States Court of Customs and Patent Appeals –

=== Patent-related lawsuits ===
- Amazon.com Inc. v. Canada (Commissioner of Patents) –
- Harvard College v. Canada (Commissioner of Patents) –
- Schlumberger Canada Ltd. v. Canada (Commissioner of Patents) –
- Shell Oil Co. v. Commissioner of Patents –
- Tennessee Eastman Co. v. Commissioner of Patents –
- Ralf Sieckmann v Deutsches Patent und Markenamt –

=== Patent legislation ===
- Copyright, Designs and Patents Act 1988 –
- Drug Price Competition and Patent Term Restoration Act –
- Invention Secrecy Act –
- Patent Act –
- Patent Act (Canada) –
- Patent Act of 1790 –
- Patent Act of 1836 –
- Patent Act of 1922 –
- Patent Act of 1952 –
- Patent Reform Act –
- Patent Reform Act of 2005 –
- Patent Reform Act of 2007 –
- Patent Reform Act of 2009 –
- Patent and Designs Act 1911 –
- Patents Act 2004 –
- Plant Patent Act of 1930 –

=== Patent treaties ===
- Convention on the Unification of Certain Points of Substantive Law on Patents for Invention –
- European Convention on the International Classification of Patents for Invention –
- European Convention relating to the Formalities required for Patent Applications –
- Eurasian Patent Convention –
- European Patent Convention –
  - Amendments under the European Patent Convention –
  - Claims under the European Patent Convention –
  - Disclosure of the invention under the European Patent Convention –
  - Divisional applications under the European Patent Convention –
  - Inventive step under the European Patent Convention –
  - Novelty under the European Patent Convention –
  - Observations by third parties under the European Patent Convention –
  - Petition for review under the European Patent Convention –
  - Restitutio in integrum under the European Patent Convention –
  - Software patents under the European Patent Convention –
  - Unity of invention under the European Patent Convention –
- Patent Cooperation Treaty –
  - Computer programs and the Patent Cooperation Treaty –
- Patent Law Treaty –
- Substantive Patent Law Treaty –

==== Parties to patent treaties ====
- Parties to international patent treaties –

=== Patent law by region ===
- Australian patent law –
- Canadian patent law –
  - Defences and remedies in Canadian patent law –
  - Novelty and non-obviousness in Canadian patent law –
  - Presumption of validity in Canadian patent law –
  - Software patents under Canadian patent law –
  - Sufficiency of disclosure in Canadian patent law –
  - Utility in Canadian patent law –
  - Subject matter in Canadian patent law –
- European patent law –
  - Patent law of the European Union –
  - German patent law –
  - Unitary patent (proposed) –
- Japanese patent law –
- Patent law of the People's Republic of China –
  - Patent law in Hong Kong –
- United Kingdom patent law
  - Software patents under United Kingdom patent law –
- United States patent law –
  - Biological patents in the United States –
  - Software patents under United States patent law –
  - Term of patent in the United States –

== Patent administration ==
- Backlog of unexamined patent applications –
- South African patent system –

=== Patent offices ===
- Patent and Trademark Office –
- Patent office –
- Directorate of Patents and Trademarks (Albania) –
- Patent offices in Europe –
  - Danish Patent and Trademark Office –
  - European Patent Office –
    - Appeal procedure before the European Patent Office –
    - Case Law of the Boards of Appeal of the European Patent Office –
    - List of decisions and opinions of the Enlarged Board of Appeal of the European Patent Office –
    - Fees in proceedings before the European Patent Office –
    - Grant procedure before the European Patent Office –
    - Official Journal of the European Patent Office –
    - Guidelines for Examination in the European Patent Office –
    - Limitation and revocation procedures before the European Patent Office –
    - Opposition procedure before the European Patent Office –
    - European Patent Office Reports –
    - Representation before the European Patent Office –
    - Standing Advisory Committee before the European Patent Office –
  - Italian Patent and Trademark Office –
  - Patent Office of the Republic of Latvia –
  - Netherlands Patent Office –
  - Polish Patent Office –
  - Spanish Patent and Trademark Office –
  - Swedish Patent and Registration Office –
- GCC Patent Office –
- Indian Patent Office –
- Israel Patent Office –
- Japan Patent Office –
- Patent office in Indonesia –
- United States Patent and Trademark Office –

== Specific patents ==
- U.S. Patent No. 1 –
- Abraham Lincoln's patent –
- Cabilly patents – two US patents issued to Genentech and City of Hope which relate to the "fundamental technology required for the artificial synthesis of antibody molecules." The name refers to lead inventor Shmuel Cabilly, who was awarded the patent while working at City of Hope in the 1980s.
- Edison patents –
- Nikola Tesla patents –
- Hendrik Wade Bode patents –
- Reginald Tessenden patents –
- Software patents –
- Steam technology patents –
- X-patents –

== Patent-related organizations ==
- Coalition for 21st Century Patent Reform –
- Chartered Institute of Patent Attorneys –
- Coalition for Patent Fairness –
- Eurasian Patent Organization –
- European Patent Institute –
- European Patent Judges' Symposium –
- European Patent Lawyers Association –
- European Patent Organisation –
  - Administrative Council of the European Patent Organisation – one of the two organs of the European Patent Organisation, the other being the European Patent Office
- Institute of Patentees and Inventors –
- International Patent Institute –
- Japan Patent Attorneys Association –
- National Association of Patent Practitioners –
- Nordic Patent Institute –
- Patent Office Professional Association –
- Software Patent Institute –
- The United States Patent Association –
- Turkish Patent Institute –
- World Intellectual Property Organization (WIPO) –
  - World Intellectual Property Indicators – an annual report published by WIPO, providing a range of indicators covering the areas of intellectual property

== Patent-related publications ==
- European Patent Bulletin –
- European Patent Office Reports (EPOR) –
- Mitteilungen der deutschen Patentanwälte –
- Official Journal of the European Patent Office –
- Patent Information News –
- Patent World –
- United States Patents Quarterly –

== People associated with patents ==
- Patent attorneys and agents –
- People associated with patent law –
- People who have headed the United States Patent Office –

== Databases and search engines ==
- Baidu Patents –
- Espacenet –
- Google Patents – search engine from Google that indexes patents and patent applications from the United States Patent and Trademark Office (USPTO), European Patent Office (EPO), and World Intellectual Property Organization (WIPO).
- Patentscope –

== See also ==
- Glossary of patent law terms – presents terms used in patent law, including special types of patents and patent applications
- Outline of intellectual property

== Other ==
- Copyright on the content of patents and in the context of patent prosecution
- Criticism of patents
- Cross-licensing
- epoline
- Evergreening
- Global Dossier
- INID codes, codes used for indicating specific bibliographic data items on the title pages of patents and patent application publications
- Innovation and its Discontents (book)
- International Patent Documentation Center (INPADOC)
- International Patent Classification (IPC)
- Internet as a source of prior art
- Invention
- Invention promotion firm
- Large and small entities in patent law
- List of patent case law
- List of people associated with patent law
- Markman hearing
- Open-source hardware
- Patent application
- Patent attorney
- Patent classification
- Patent court
- Patent examiner
- Patent holding company
- Patent infringement
- Patent misuse
- Patent monetization
- Patent Office 1836 fire (United States)
- Patent pirate
- Patent pool
- Patent portfolio
- Patent privateer
- Patent prosecution
- Patent Prosecution Highway (PPH)
- Patent thicket
- Patent troll
- Patent visualisation
- Pirate Party
- Public participation in patent examination
- Scams in intellectual property
