= Outline of intellectual property =

Overview of and topical guide to intellectual property

The following outline is provided as an overview and topical guide to intellectual property:

Intellectual property refers to intangible assets such as musical, literary, and artistic works; discoveries and inventions; and words, phrases, symbols, and designs. Common types of intellectual property rights include copyrights, trademarks, patents, industrial design rights, trade dress, and in some jurisdictions, trade secrets. These may be sometimes called intellectual rights.

See outline of patents for a topical guide and overview of patents.

== Types ==
Some examples of intellectual property include:

- Artistic work
  - Literature
  - Music
  - Painting
  - Sculpture
- Computer program
- Indigenous intellectual property
- Internet domain name
- Invention
- Sound recording (or phonogram)
- Trademark
  - Service mark
- Trade secret

== Rights ==
- Authors' rights
- Copyright
- Database right
- Industrial design rights (or registered designs)
- Intellectual rights to magic methods
- Moral rights
- Passing off
- Patents
- Personality rights
- Related rights
- Plant breeders' rights
- Trade dress

== Law ==
- Fashion law
- Integrated circuit layout design protection
- Plant variety protection
- Supplementary protection certificate

=== Copyright ===
- Berne Convention
- Copyright
- Copyright Clause of the U.S. Constitution
- History of copyright law
- Moral rights
- Philosophy of copyright
- Sound recording copyright
- Statute of Anne

=== Patents ===
- Patents
- History of patent law
- Biological patent
- Software patent
- Utility model

==== Procedures ====
- Patent application
- Patent infringement and enforcement
- Patent licensing
- Patent prosecution

==== Legal requirements ====
- Patentable subject matter
- Novelty
- Utility (patent)
- Inventive step and non-obviousness
- Industrial applicability
- Person having ordinary skill in the art
- Prior art
- Inventorship
- Sufficiency of disclosure
- Unity of invention

==== By region or country ====
- Australian patent law
- Canadian patent law
- Patent law of China
- European patent law
- Japanese patent law
- United States patent law

=== Trademarks ===
- Geographical indication
- Protected designation of origin
- Trade dress
- Trademark (including service marks)

== General topics ==
- Anti-copyright
- Arrow information paradox
- Background, foreground, sideground and postground intellectual property
- Copyright for Creativity
- Copyright infringement
  - Copyfraud
  - Industrial espionage
  - File sharing
  - Music piracy
  - Patent troll
  - Plagiarism
  - Scams in intellectual property
- Digital rights management
- Exhaustion of intellectual property rights
  - Exhaustion doctrine under U.S. law
  - First-sale doctrine
- Free culture movement
- Free software movement
- Free content
- Intangible asset
- Intellectual capital
- Intellectual rights
- Intellectual property brokering
- Intellectual property education
- Intellectual property infringement
- Intellectual property valuation
- IPR-Helpdesk
- Legal aspects of computing
- License
  - Public copyright license
  - All rights reserved
  - All rights reversed
  - Anti-copyright notice
  - Copyleft
  - Free license
  - Share-alike
- Limitations and exceptions to copyright
  - Fair dealing
  - Fair use
  - Freedom of panorama
  - Right to quote
- List of intellectual property law journals
- Orphan works
- Public domain
- Reverse engineering
- Societal views on intellectual property
- Societal views on patents
- Soft intellectual property, a term sometimes used to refer to trademarks, copyright, and design rights

== Legal agreements and government enforcement ==
- Adelphi Charter
- Agreement on Trade-Related Aspects of Intellectual Property Rights (TRIPS)
- Anti-Counterfeiting Trade Agreement (ACTA)
- China International Copyright Expo
- Doha Declaration
- EU Directive on the enforcement of intellectual property rights
- French Intellectual Property Code
- Intellectual property issues in cultural heritage (IPinCH)
- Intellectual property organization (including a list of intellectual property organizations)
- Intellectual property protection in consumer electronics industry
- International Union for the Protection of New Varieties of Plants (UPOV)
- Paris Convention for the Protection of Industrial Property
- Plant Variety Protection Act (U.S.)
- U.S. Immigration and Customs Enforcement
- World Intellectual Property Organization (WIPO)
- World Intellectual Property Day (April 26)

== See also ==
- Entertainment law
- Mimi & Eunice, a comic strip about intellectual property problems
