= Federal Patent Court =

Federal Patent Court may refer to:

- Federal Patent Court of Germany
- Federal Patent Court of Switzerland

== See also ==
- Patent court
