= Ordinary court =

Court with comprehensive jurisdiction

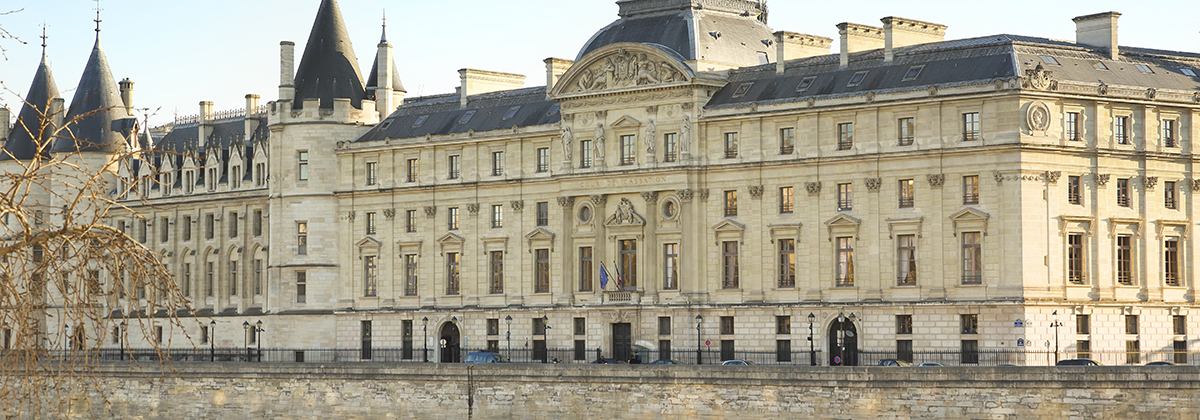
Cour de cassation in France is an example of a supreme ordinary court.

Ordinary court or judicial court is a type of court with comprehensive subject-matter jurisdiction compared to a specialized court with limited jurisdiction over specific field of matters, such as intellectual property court. Due to its comprehensive feature, ordinary courts usually deal with civil case and criminal case, and treated as core part of conventional judiciary. Especially for common law countries, the term superior court is used for courts with general jurisdiction (regardless of instance level in chain of appellate procedure), compared to courts with limited jurisdiction over minor, petty cases such as small claims court. Sometimes, the term ordinary court is referred to courts with regular procedure or composition, compared to an extraordinary court with irregular procedure or composition.

== Ordinary courts by country ==
=== France ===
In France, ordinary courts (French: ordre judiciaire) are courts under Title VIII of Constitution of France, and are separated from administrative courts and constitutional court. These ordinary courts mainly deals with civil and criminal cases, and are composed of judges called magistrates (French: magistrat) who are educated from French National School for the Judiciary, while judges composing administrative court and constitutional court are usually not trained in French National School for the Judiciary. Chain of ordinary court's hierarchy inside French judiciary has Court of Cassation as their highest court.

=== Germany ===
In Germany, ordinary courts are explained as courts with "ordinary jurisdiction" (German: Ordentliche Gerichtsbarkeit), compared to special jurisdictions such as administrative, labour, social security, and fiscal law. Though each of these five jurisdictions including ordinary jurisdiction has its own highest court (usually translated as federal courts, German: Bundesgericht), all of jurisdictions share same route of legal education and training for Judges. The Federal Court of Justice is highest court of chain of ordinary court's hierarchy. Under ordinary jurisdiction, Federal Patent Court is established as lower court of the Federal Court of Justice concerning intellectual property matters. It is notable that court rulings from each of federal courts cannot be appealed, yet can be reviewed as constitutional complaint (German: Urteilsverfassungsbeschwerde) in Federal Constitutional Court, which is outside of chain of ordinary court's hierarchy, concerning specific issues on constitutionality of such ruling.

=== South Korea ===
In South Korea, ordinary courts (Korean: 일반법원) are founded by Chapter V, Article 101 of Constitution of South Korea and the Court Organization Act, separated from military courts (Korean: 군사법원 by Chapter V, Article 110) and the Constitutional Court (Korean: 헌법재판소 by Chapter VI, Article 111). These ordinary courts are usually referred to merely as Court (Korean: 법원), and have Supreme Court of Korea as their highest court. Inside chain of ordinary court's hierarchy, there are lower courts with specialized jurisdictions, such as family court, administrative court, patent court, and bankruptcy court according to Article 3(1) of the Act. Unlike Germany, whether rulings from ordinary courts can be reviewed as constitutional complaint remains as controversy in South Korea.

== See also ==
- Extraordinary court
- General jurisdiction
- Specialized court
- Superior court
