= Privateering (disambiguation) =

Privateering is warfare which, if carried out other than on behalf of a state, would constitute piracy.

Privateering also may refer to:

- Privateering (album) (2012) by Mark Knopfler

== See also ==
- Patent privateer, a party other than the patent owner who acts to enforce a patent
