= Patent monetization =

Patent monetization refers to the generation of revenue or the attempt to generate revenue by a person or company by selling or licensing the patents it owns.

Some of these owners try to make money from patents on inventions they develop, manufacture or market. Others attempt to generate revenue by buying and enforcing patents against one or more alleged infringers in a manner considered by the target or observers as unduly aggressive or opportunistic, often with no intention to further develop, manufacture or market the patented invention. The latter group is pejoratively called patent trolls by their critics.

== History ==
Texas Instruments is believed to be the first company to monetize in the 1990s its portfolio of patents (more than 38,000 in total) when the company was losing market share to competitors.

After the Texas Instruments example, IBM was another company who used the same technique in the 1990s to monetize its own patents to make more than $1 billion annually in revenue.

Also in the 1990s, mainframe computer manufacturer Unisys and minicomputer manufacturer Wang turned to patent monetization in the face of declining product revenue resulting from the microcomputer revolution. Unisys sued software companies over its patent underlying GIF technology and Wang sued RAM manufacturers over its patent involving RAM parity bits.

Microsoft uses its patents to make deals with the major Android vendors, which amount to more than 70% of Android's market share.

Eastman Kodak is an example of a struggling company which use its patents portfolio to make additional revenue. For example, it is said that Kodaks' licensing programs have generated more than $3 billion in revenue since 2004.

Nokia generated €500 million from patents in 2013.

=== Guangdong Deal ===
Eleven high-tech companies in China's Guangzhou Development District, through a sales-and-licensing back arrangement, collectively securitized their patents in exchange for a proceed of CN¥300 million on July 31, 2019, which was reportedly the first patent securitization deal in China.

=== Ant Group ===
Alibaba Group made an in-kind investment by contributing IPs appraised at CN¥12 billion to Ant Group in exchange for one-third shareholding.

The IPs contributed through in-kind investment account to 90% of Ant Group’s IPs, including 26,279 patents applied or granted, 8,569 trademarks, 677 copyrights, 3,927 domain names, and 369 design patents and trade secrets in 40 countries and regions at home and abroad, covering the technological areas of artificial intelligence, risk control, security, and blockchain.

In November 2020 before Ant Groups’ IPO was put on hold, its estimated market capitalization was once about CN¥2.1 trillion, i.e., the CN¥12 billion becoming CN¥700 billion market value (1/3 of the shareholding), about 50 times investment return generated from Alibaba’s IP Monetization.

== See also ==
- Background, foreground, sideground and postground intellectual property
- Patent holding company
- Patent privateer
- Patent valuation
- Intellectual property in China
