= EPOR =

EPOR may refer to:

- European Patent Office Reports
- Erythropoietin receptor
