= Defensive termination =

Defensive termination is a form of implicit cross licensing of patent or other intellectual property rights. Consider a case where company A licenses patent A to company B. One of the conditions of the license agreement is that if company B should ever sue company A for infringing one of company B's own patents, such as patent B, then Company A can terminate the license to patent A. Thus company A would be able to counter sue company B for infringing patent A. This is a strong incentive to prevent company B from suing company A for any future patent it might receive after it has licensed patent A.

The World Business Council for Sustainable Development, for example, has a defensive termination clause built into its "Eco-Patent Commons". The Apache 2.0 License also includes a defensive termination clause.
