= German patent law =

German patent law is mainly governed by the Patents Act (German: Patentgesetz) and the European Patent Convention (EPC).

== Obtaining patent protection ==
A patent covering Germany can be obtained through four different routes: through the direct filing of a national patent application with the German Patent and Trade Mark Office (German: Deutsches Patent- und Markenamt) (direct national route), through the filing of a European patent application (EPO route), or through the filing of an international application under the Patent Cooperation Treaty followed by the entry into either the European phase (the so-called "Euro-PCT" route, which runs through EPO) or the national (German) phase of said international application. The German patent has a term of 20 years.

After grant of a patent through the EPO or the Euro-PCT route a European patent is valid in Germany without further translation requirements if that country was indicated in the application. If unitary effect is requested upon grant of a European patent, that unitary patent also applies in Germany.

== Litigation ==
For German patents granted through the direct route and European patents (except unitary patents) the German courts are competent to hear cases. For European patents that were not opted out, this competence is shared with the Unified Patent Court. The Unified Patent Court is also competent to hear cases regarding unitary patents.

The German patent litigation system is one of the few patent systems in which the issue of patent infringement and of patent validity are dealt with by different courts. The district courts, such as the Düsseldorf Regional Court, the Munich Regional Court, and the Mannheim Regional Court, deal with infringement, whereas the Federal Patent Court (Bundespatentgericht) is in charge of deciding the validity of patents. Such a system is sometimes dubbed a "bifurcation system."

== See also ==
- Injunction gap
- Rote Taube ("Red Dove"), a landmark decision of the Federal Court of Justice (Bundesgerichtshof) (X ZB 15/67, 27 March 1969)
