= Copyright law of Switzerland =

Copyright Act (CopA)
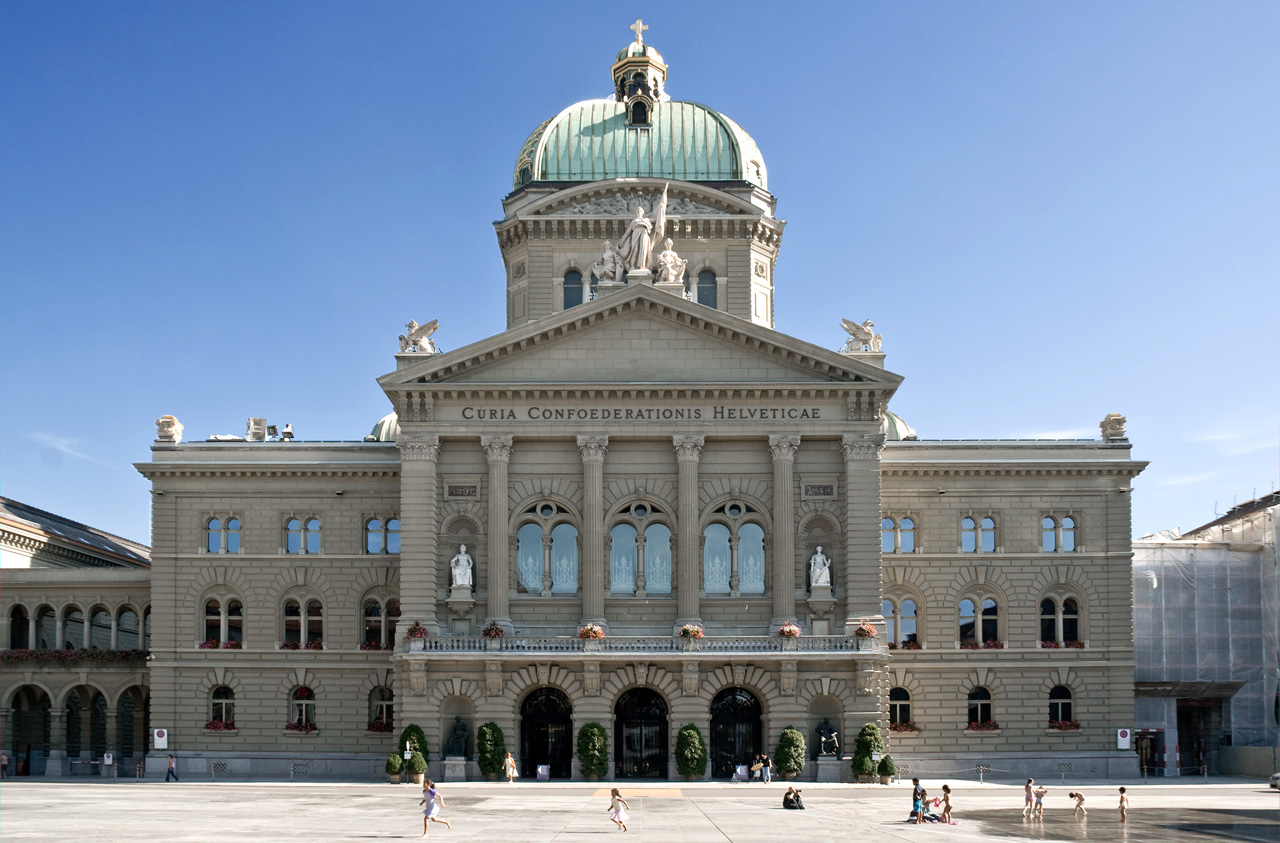

Federal Assembly of Switzerland
- Long title: Federal Act on Copyright and Related Rights (SR 231.1)
- Territorial extent: Switzerland
- Enacted by: Federal Assembly of Switzerland
- Enacted: 9 October 1992
- Commenced: 1 July 1993

Repeals
- Federal Law of 7 December 1922 on Copyright in Literary and Artistic Works
- Status: Current legislation

The copyright law of Switzerland is based on the concept of "author's rights" (Urheberrecht in German, droit d'auteur in French, diritto d'autore in Italian), which is similar to the French copyright law, instead of the concept of copyright used in common law jurisdictions. The current copyright law of Switzerland is the Copyright Act (CopA) (Note: German: Urheberrechtsgesetz, URG; French: Loi sur le droit d’auteur, LDA; Italian: Legge sul diritto d’autore, LDA) of 1992, which dates from October 9, 1992 and has only seen minor revisions since then. In October 2007, a revision was approved in order to implement the WIPO Copyright Treaty in the act, a process started in 2004 with the release by the Swiss Federal Council of a draft project.

Copyrights in Swiss law last for 70 years after the death of the author (50 years after the death of the author for computer programs). All "works" in the sense of the law, i.e. "creations of the mind, literary or artistic, that have an individual character" are automatically protected by copyright, irrespective of whether copyright is asserted or not, but provided that it passes the threshold of originality necessary to constitute a protected work. In the case of photographs, the level of protection has been defined in two decisions of the Swiss Federal Supreme Court, the “Bob Marley” case (2003) and the “Meili” case (2004). These decisions were superseded by the insertion of Article 2 paragraph 3bis, effective 1 April 2020. "Photographic depictions and depictions of three-dimensional objects produced by a process similar to that of photography are considered works, even if they do not have individual character."

Certain documents are specifically excluded from benefiting from copyright protection in Switzerland; they are mostly official documents, such as laws or ordinances, or pieces of currency, but patents or patent applications are also excluded from protection. These exceptions are covered in detail below.

== History ==
Although first theoretic publications about copyright in Switzerland date back to 1738, the topic remained unregulated by law until the 19th century. The first copyright legislation in Switzerland was introduced during the times of the French occupation in the Napoleonic era. Geneva, which joined the Swiss Confederation in 1815, kept the French legislation (a law that dated to 1793) and thus became the first canton to have a copyright law, affording protection for 10 years p.m.a. The first copyright law developed locally in Switzerland was that of the canton of Ticino, which became effective on 20 March 1835. In the canton of Solothurn, a copyright law entered in force in 1847.

The first constitution of Switzerland of 1848 left copyright issues to the cantons; only in the revised constitution of 1874 did copyright become an issue of federal legislation. The first federal copyright law in Switzerland was passed by the Swiss parliament on April 23, 1883 and entered in force on 1 January 1884. The copyright law of 1883 specified a copyright term of 30 years p.m.a (or 30 years from the publication of posthumous works) and covered works of literature and the arts (Art. 2); photographs required registration and the copyright lasted 5 years from registration (Art. 9). The exclusive rights included the right to translate a literary work (art. 1).

Two years later, Switzerland was a founding member of the Berne Convention for the Protection of Literary and Artistic Works, which became effective on December 5, 1887.

In 1922 this first federal copyright law was replaced. The new law was passed by parliament on 7 December 1922 and entered in force on 1 July 1923. It clarified what exactly "works of literature and of the arts" were (Art. 1), and extended copyright to include photographic works and collections. The copyright term remained 30 years; pre-existing works that we not covered by the earlier law(s) were now also copyrighted (art. 62). Works that became known to the public only after the death of the author were copyrighted until the shorter of 50 years after the death of the author or 30 years since they became known. In the case of anonymous works, the editor or publisher acquired the copyright (Art. 8). The law covered works of the literature and the arts, including scientific works, maps, and photographs.

In 1955, a revision of the 1922 law extended the copyright term from 30 to 50 years. This extension was not retroactive and applied only to works that were still copyrighted in 1955 (art. 66bis).

Already three years later, work on an omnibus revision of the law was begun, but it took more than 30 years to complete this project until in 1992 a new copyright law was passed. It entered in force on 1 July 1993 and extended the copyright term again non-retroactively to 70 years.

In 2004, another revision of the Swiss copyright law was begun with the goal of making the law compliant with the WIPO Copyright Treaty (WCT) and the WIPO Performances and Phonograms Treaty (WPPT). It was finally approved by both chambers of the Swiss parliament on 5 October 2007. At the same time, the parliament also ratified the Swiss adherence to the WCT and the WPPT. The revised law entered in force on 1 July 2008.

In 2019, another revision to Swiss copyright law was approved by the Federal Assembly, which came into force on 1 April 2020. It adds copyright exceptions for data mining of legally-obtained works for research purposes, and expands the exceptions for orphan works. It establishes that photographs of three-dimensional objects can now be protected by copyright, even if they do not display individuality. They also introduce a notice and stay down procedure for services which host copyright infringing works, establish that IP addresses can now be collected and submitted to authorities as part of copyright infringement investigations, and introduce a new remuneration scheme for works offered via video on demand platforms.

== Duration of protection ==
Copyright protection for most protected works expires 70 years after the death of the author under Swiss law, the only exception being computer programs, which are protected for 50 years after the death of the author. The protection also expires if the death must be assumed. The date of death of the last author is relevant in cases of co-authorship, unless the contributions are separable. The 50 or 70 years of protection are counted starting at the end of the year when the author (or last author) died. Works of unknown authors enter the public domain 70 years after the date of publication (even if the author is identified once the protection has ended).

Swiss law also protects performers' rights; the duration of protection is 50 years, starting from the end of the year when the work was performed.

As a result of the non-retroactive revision of 1992, when the 50-year copyright term was extended to 70 years, works that were already in the public domain in 1993, when the new law started being applied, do not benefit from renewed protection; therefore, all works made by authors deceased in 1942 or before are in the public domain in Switzerland.

== Official documents ==
The following are ineligible for copyright by law:

- laws, decrees, international treaties or other official acts
- decisions, protocols or reports by public authorities
- pieces of currency
- patents or patent applications

It follows that photographs taken from or of these documents are also in the public domain. However:

- a photograph of an official document may constitute a protected work of its own if the photograph is sufficiently original (see below);
- a photograph taken from an official document may have been copyrighted by someone other than the state and been reproduced with permission in the official document.

== Lack of originality ==
In the Bob Marley decision, a photograph of Bob Marley by a spectator was deemed to have enough individual character to be protectable by Swiss law.

Likewise in the Meili decision, a photograph of Christoph Meili was deemed not to have an individual character.

Only "works" in the sense of the law, i.e. "creations of the mind, literary or artistic, that have an individual character", are protected by copyright. What exactly individuality (also referred to as originality) means for photographs has long been a focus of dispute. Up until 2020, it meant that many photographs lacked copyright protection.

In its 2003 Marley decision, the Federal Supreme Court found that the picture at issue (shot by a spectator with a handheld camera) had the required individual character by virtue of the aesthetic appeal of the picture, combined with the orientation of the picture's components and the distribution of light and shadow. It also found that it was a "creation of the mind" by being shot at a specific time during the singer's movement on the stage. Accordingly, the Court held that the picture was protected by copyright.

In its 2004 Meili decision, the Court found that the picture at issue, shot by a reporter to document Christoph Meili with the files he had taken from his employer, lacked individual character. It found that the scope of conceptual and technical possibilities was not exploited, and that the photograph did not distinguish itself in any way from what was common use. For lack of an individual expression of thought, therefore, the Court held that the image was not copyrighted.

Legal scholarship has attempted to summarise the Federal Supreme Court's jurisprudence on the threshold of originality as follows:

- Images where only the object, but not the photograph, is individual are not protected, as e.g. in art catalogue photographs. Of course, the copyright status of the object depicted, e.g. a painting, must be considered independently.
- "Merely" illustrative and portrait images also tend not to be protected, at least if the composition, post-processing etc. show no individual expression of thought.
- Images are not protected per se because their object is famous or they attract great attention (e.g. the Abraham Zapruder pictures of the Kennedy assassination). On the other hand, an image can be a "snapshot" and still be protected as an individual work.
- The impression is given that the mere aesthetic appeal of a photograph may contribute to its originality.

As of the Copyright Act adopted on 1 April 2020, works that are "photographic depictions and depictions of three-dimensional objects produced by a process similar to that of photography" are now eligible for copyright, even if they do not display an individual character. However, such works receive a shorter copyright term lasting only for 50 years after production of the photograph (Art. 29 par. 2 a^{bis}) and not for the regular copyright term of 70 years after the death of the creator.

== Freedom of panorama ==
Freedom of panorama is regulated in article 27 of the Swiss Urheberrechtsgesetz, which states that works permanently situated on public grounds can be visually represented for any purposes, provided that the representation is not in three-dimensional form and cannot be used "for the same purpose as the original."

== See also ==
- Bridgeman Art Library v. Corel Corp. for the equivalent leading case in U.S. law.
- International copyright
- Federal Patent Court of Switzerland

== Notes and references ==
=== Authorities ===
- Bloch: Neue Schauspiel AG gegen Felix Bloch Erben, decision of the Swiss Federal Supreme Court of 13 January 1998; BGE 124 III 266.
- Marley: X. gegen Y. AG, decision of the Swiss Federal Supreme Court of September 5, 2003; BGE 130 III 168.
- Meili: Blau Guggenheim gegen British Broadcasting Corporation BBC, decision of the Swiss Federal Supreme Court of April 19, 2004; BGE 130 III 714.
- URG/LDA: Swiss Federal Copyright Act of 1992, ref. 231.1 (Urheberrechtsgesetz, URG (in German), Loi sur le droit d’auteur, LDA (in French), Legge sul diritto d’autore, LDA (in Italian)

=== Literature ===
==== Copyright law in general ====
- Hilty, Reto M.: Urheberrecht, Stämpfli Verlang, Berne 2011. ISBN 978-3-7272-8660-5. (in German)
- Rigamonti, Cyrill P.: Geistiges Eigentum als Begriff und Theorie des Urheberrechts. UFITA-Schriftenreihe Band 194, Nomos Verlagsgesellschaft, Baden-Baden 2001. ISBN 3-7890-7534-5. (in German)
- Barrelet, D.; Egloff, W.: Das neue Urheberrecht, 3rd ed. Stämpfli Verlag, Berne 2008. ISBN 978-3-7272-9563-8. (in German)
- von Büren, R.: Urheberrecht und verwandte Schutzrechte, in: Pedrazzini, Mario M.; von Büren, Roland; Marbach, Eugen: Immaterialgüter- und Wettbewerbsrecht, Stämpfli Verlag AG, Berne 1998, ISBN 3-7272-0913-5, p. 59 et seq. (in German)
- Rehbinder, M.: Schweizerisches Urheberrecht, 3rd ed. Stämpfli Verlag, Berne 2000. ISBN 3-7272-0923-2. (in German)

==== Copyright protection of photographs ====
- Friedli, Lukas: Gibt es das Bildzitat im schweizerischen URG?, in: Jusletter 24. April 2006
- Hug, Gitti: Bob Marley vs Christoph Meili. Ein Schnappschuss. In: Sic! Zeitschrift für Immaterialgüter-, Informations- und Wettbewerbsrecht 1/2005. Schulthess, pp. 57–65; ISSN 1422-2019.
- Schütz, Christoph: Fotografie und Urheberrecht: Ein Sorgenkind im Wettstreit der Therapeuten, in: Sic! Zeitschrift für Immaterialgüter-, Informations- und Wettbewerbsrecht 5/2006. Schulthess, pp. 36–75; ISSN 1422-2019.
- Wild, Gregor: Urheberrechtsschutz der Fotografie, in: Sic! Zeitschrift für Immaterialgüter-, Informations- und Wettbewerbsrecht 2/2005. Schulthess, pp. 87–95; ISSN 1422-2019.
