= Federal Criminal Court of Switzerland =

Judicial institution in Bellinzona, Switzerland

- Interactive map of Federal Criminal Court of Switzerland
- Jurisdiction: Switzerland

The Federal Criminal Court, (German: Bundesstrafgericht; French: Tribunal pénal féderal; Italian: Tribunale penale federale; Romansh: Tribunal penal federal) is a Swiss federal court. Since its inception in 2004, it has been located in Bellinzona.

== Legal basis ==
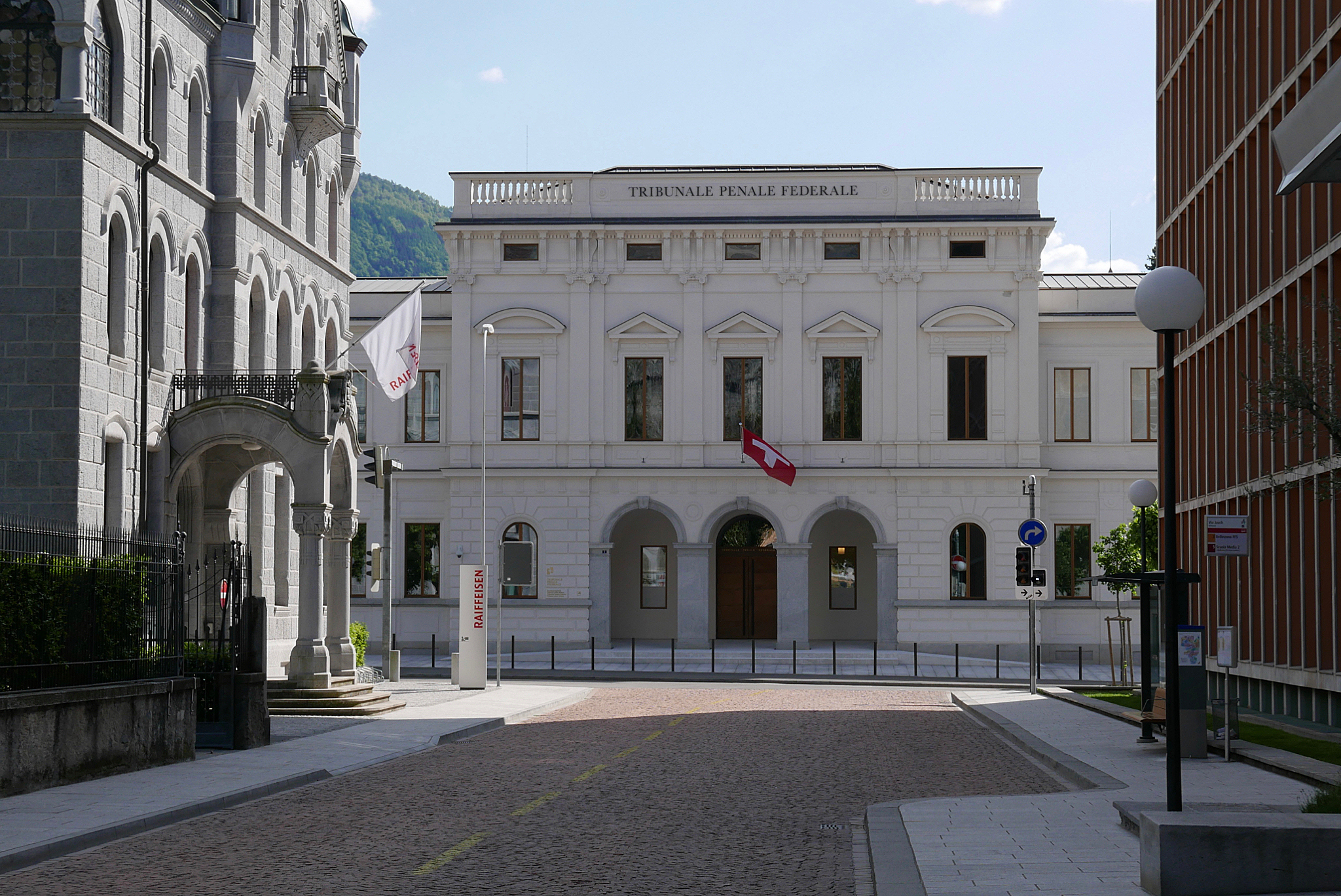
Federal Criminal Court of Switzerland in Bellinzona

Article 191a para. 1 of the Swiss Constitution of 18 April 1999, (SC; SR [Classified Compilation of Federal Legislation] no. 101) states: The Confederation shall appoint a criminal court, which shall hear at first instance criminal cases that by law come under federal jurisdiction. The law may confer further powers on the Federal Criminal Court.

The Federal Act on the Organization of the Federal Criminal Authorities (SR no. 173.71) governs status, organization, jurisdiction and the applicable procedural law.

Furthermore, its internal Organizational Regulations of 31 August 2010, (SR no. 173.713.161) provides for the rules applicable to the Federal Criminal Court's organization and administration.

== Jurisdiction ==
The Federal Criminal Court's Criminal Chamber renders decisions on indictments for crimes that by law come under federal jurisdiction; primarily the felonies specified in articles 23 and 24 of the Criminal Procedure Code of 5 October 2007 (Criminal Procedure Code, CPC; SR no. 312.0). The Court's Criminal Chamber moreover tries criminal offences for which jurisdiction is conferred upon the Court either by administrative criminal law or by other federal acts.

The Federal Criminal Court's Lower Appeals Chamber provides judicial review in unfolding federal criminal proceedings, in particular by adjudicating complaints against the rulings and procedural acts of the police, the Office of the Attorney General of Switzerland (the federal public prosecutor), the Court's Penal Chamber and the Compulsory Measures Court. Its jurisdiction encompasses other matters; paramount among those are, both in number of cases and in material significance, remedies concerning international assistance in criminal matters (including cases of extradition).

From the 2019, there's also a new Higher Appeals Chamber, which is the second instance in federal criminal cases. It hears appeals against Criminal Chamber judgments that wholly or partially conclude proceedings. It also hears applications for a review of Criminal Chamber or Higher Appeals Chamber judgments that have come into effect as well as appeals against summary penalty orders issued by the Office of the Attorney General of Switzerland (OAG), subsequent court decisions and decisions rendered in independently conducted action procedures.

== Organisation and size ==
Pursuant to articles 32 et sqq. of the Federal Act on the Organization of the Federal Criminal Authorities, the Federal Criminal Court comprises the two above-mentioned chambers (each with a presiding judge) and the General Secretariat with its administrative and technical services. The Court manifests and administrates itself by dint of the following executive bodies: the Office of the Chief Justice, the Court's Plenary Assembly and the Administrative Commission.

As of August 2013, the Federal Criminal Court is constituted with a staff of about 80 people, 22 of which are judges.

== Full-time positions since 2007 ==
Raw data

Source: "Federal Finance Administration FFA: Data portal".

== See also ==
- Crime in Switzerland
