= The United States Patent Association =

American non-governmental organization

The United States Patent Association was a non-governmental organization active in the United States in the late 19th century. Their purpose was to promote the benefits of patents for society. Association membership comprised US patent examiners, patent agents and attorneys and inventors. Their activities included having meetings, giving public presentations and publishing essays.

== Essays ==
- Perry, John, S., "A Defence of our Patent System", United States Patent Association, J.R. Osgood & Co., of Boston, Mass., 1875
- Howson, H., "Our Country's Debt to Patents", United States Patent Association, J.R. Osgood & Co., of Boston, Mass., 1875
- Howson, Henry, Sr. “What we owe to patents”, U.S. Patent Association, M'Calla & Stavely, 1874.

== Former officers and directors ==
- Norman C. Stiles inventor and founder of Stiles & Parker Press Company of Middletown, Connecticut

== Modern stock scams using the name of the United States Patent Association ==
Modern patent scam

Certain promoters of stocks claim that their companies have “patents registered with the Untied [sic]States Patent Association”. This is a meaningless designation because:

- The United States Patent Association does not exist anymore, and
- There is no such thing as "holding patents with an association". Patents are issued by governments only.

== See also ==
- Intellectual property organization
- Patent
- Scams in intellectual property
