= Cross-licensing =

Mutual intellectual property contract

A cross-licensing agreement is a contract between two or more parties where each party grants rights to their intellectual property to the other parties.

== Patent law ==
In patent law, a cross-licensing agreement is an agreement according to which two or more parties grant a license to each other for the exploitation of the subject-matter claimed in one or more of the patents each owns. Usually, this type of agreement happens between two parties in order to avoid litigation or to settle an infringement dispute. Very often, the patents that each party owns covers different essential aspects of a given commercial product. Thus by cross licensing, each party maintains their freedom to bring the commercial product to market. The term "cross licensing" implies that neither party pays monetary royalties to the other party, although this may be the case.

For example, Microsoft and JVC entered into a cross license agreement in January 2008. Each party, therefore, is able to practice the inventions covered by the patents included in the agreement. This benefits competition by allowing each more freedom to design products covered by the other's patents without provoking a patent infringement lawsuit.

Parties that enter into cross-licensing agreements must be careful not to violate antitrust laws and regulations. This can easily become a complex issue, involving (as far as the European Union is concerned) Art. 101 and 102 of the Treaty on the Functioning of the European Union (TFEU), previously Art. 81 and 82 of the EC Treaty, (abuse of dominant position, etc.) as well as licensing directives, cartels, etc.

Some companies file patent applications primarily to be able to cross license the resulting patents, as opposed to trying to stop a competitor from bringing a product to market. In the early 1990s, for example, Taiwanese original design manufacturers, such as Hon Hai, rapidly increased their patent filings after their US competitors brought patent infringement lawsuits against them. They used the patents to cross license.

One of the limitations of cross licensing is that it is ineffective against patent holding companies. The primary business of a patent holding company is to license patents in exchange for a monetary royalty. Thus, they have no need for rights to practice other companies' patents. These companies are often referred to pejoratively as patent trolls.

The economics literature has shown that firms with high capital intensities are more likely to strike a cross-licensing deal.

== Non patent law ==
Other non-patent intellectual property such as copyright and trademark can also be cross-licensed. For example, a literary work and an anthology that includes that literary work may be cross-licensed between two publishers. A cross-license for computer software may involve a combination of patent, copyright, and trademark licensing.

== Examples ==
- Intel and AMD (x86-32 and x86-64)
- Nvidia and AMD (PC GPU)

== See also ==
- Copyright protection for fictional characters
- Crossover (fiction)
- Defensive termination
- Category:Intercompany crossovers
- Licensing (strategic alliance)
- Licensing Executives Society International
- Patent thicket
