= Medical patent =

A medical patent may refer to

- a biological patent (see also gene patent)
- a chemical or pharmaceutical patent
- a patent on a medical device
- Second medical indication, a patent claim for a new use of a known pharmaceutical

== See also ==
- Generic drug
- Patent medicine
