= Norman C. Stiles =

American inventor

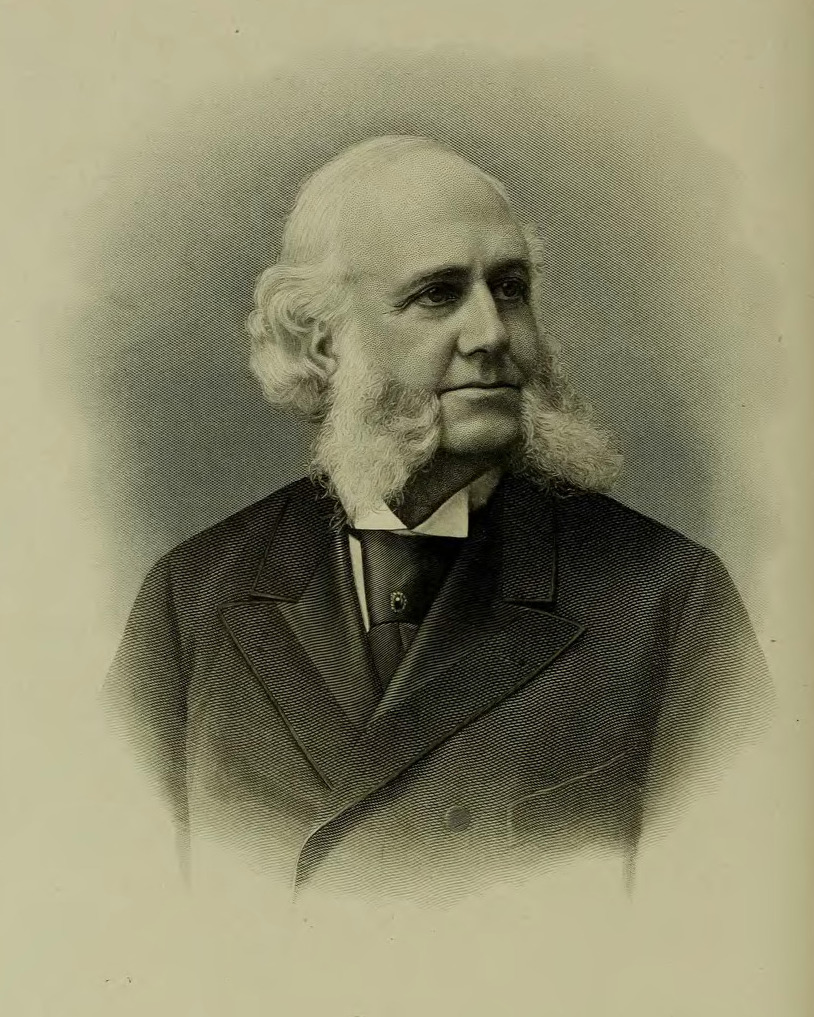
- Born: 18 June 1834; Feeding Hills
- Died: 4 February 1907 (aged 72); Hartford
- Occupation: Inventor

Norman C. Stiles (June 18, 1834, Feeding Hills, Agawam, Massachusetts – 1907, Middletown, Connecticut) was an American inventor.

== Youth ==
His father was an industrious farmer, a raiser of tobacco, and also engaged in the manufacture and sale of whip lashes, an important article of manufacture at that period. When Stiles was but five years of age, his father lost his property, and the son was thus deprived of the educational facilities and other opportunities enjoyed by most boys his age. The inventive genius and mechanical taste were early developed in the lad, and when but ten years of age he had thoroughly investigates the "true inwardness" of a clock, by taking it apart and putting it together again, leaving it in good running order. When he was but 12 years of age he built an ell to his father's house, doing all the work alone, including the painting. He constructed various other devices about this time, displaying remarkable mechanical ability as well as inventiveness. He made a miniature steam engine and fire engine, and constructed a violin.

At the age of 16, he removed to Meriden, CT, and engaged with his brother in the manufacture of tinware; but this gave him no opportunity to develop his mechanical tastes, and he soon after became connected with the American Machine Works, at Springfield, Massachusetts, where he remained until he was of age. He subsequently engaged himself to a Mr. Osgood, who was a contractor for the Holyoke Machine Company. He soon after returned to Meriden, Connecticut, and entered the employ of Snow, Brooks & Company, which had become known as Parker Brothers & Company by the late 1800s. He was employed in making dies, and other small work requiring great skill and ingenuity. This experience proved of great value to him. He subsequently entered the employ of Edward Miller & Company, Meriden, where he remained until 1857, when he concluded to "paddle his own canoe." He at first hired bench room of B. S. Stedman, and soon after bought out the stock and tools of his landlord. In 1860, he invented a toe and instep stretcher, which proved quite a success.

== Inventions and businesses ==
In 1862, his factory was destroyed by a fire, causing a heavy loss. He soon started again, taking in, as special partner, Alden Clark, who soon after retired in favor of his nephew, George Clark. In 1867, the partnership was dissolved. When the business expanded enough that it required additional facilities, Stiles moved to Middletown, CT. Prior to this, he had made several improvements in his stamping press, making it far superior to what was known as the Fowler press. This device he patented in 1864. Parler Brothers, of Meriden, who were engaged in manufacturing the Fowler press, adopted Stiles' eccentric adjustment, which involved a long and expensive litigation, resulting finally in a compromise and the organization of the Stiles & Parker Press Company, in which Stiles held a controlling interest. His pluck and perseverance were finally rewarded with success, and he built up a large and extensive business, involving the necessity of opening a branch factory and office in New York City.

In 1873, he attended the Vienna World Exposition, obtaining a foreign market for his goods. The presses were used in the armories and navy yards of the United States, as well as those of Germany, Austria, Prussia, Sweden, Turkey, Egypt, and Mexico. Some of these manufacturers are the manufacturers of fire arms, agricultural implements, builders' hardware, locks, brass goods, clocks, sewing machines, and their attachments, tin ware, silver-plated and Britannia ware, and pocket cutlery.

== Public service ==
During his residence abroad, Stiles became prominently connected with the manager of the Vienna Exposition, and was nominated as one of the Advisory Committee, but his position as exhibitor precluded his acceptance. He was a member of the Advisory Committee at the Centennial Exposition held at Philadelphia in 1876. He is one of seven directors of The United States Patent Association, which includes examiners of the Patent Office, solicitors of patents, and inventors.

He interested himself to some extent in the public affairs of Middletown, and served two years as a member of the Board of Aldermen. He was a member of Cyrene Commandery, Knight Templars, and was also a member of the Episcopal Church of the Holy Trinity.

== Family ==
On March 23, 1864, he married Sarah M., daughter of Henry Smith, of Middletown, by whom he has had three children, Henry R., Edmund E., and Millie B.

== Patents ==
This is a partial list.

- Improved punching-press, (1864).
- Improvement in drop-presses, (1867).
- Machine for cutting wire to lengths, (1891).
- Fountain-pen, (1890).
- Fountain-pen, (1896).
