= Patent Act =

Stock short title used for legislation

Patent Act and Patents Act (with their variations) are stock short titles used in Canada, India, Malaysia, New Zealand, the United Kingdom and the United States for legislation relating to patents.

A Patent Act is a country's legislation that controls the use of patents, such as the Patentgesetz in Germany.

== List ==
=== Canada ===
- Patent Act

=== England ===
- Statute of Monopolies 1623 (21 Jas. 1. c. 3)

=== Germany ===
- German Patents Act (German: Patentgesetz)

=== India ===
- The Patents Act, 1970

=== Malaysia ===
- The Patents Act 1983

=== New Zealand ===
- Patents Act 1860 (24 Vict No 14)
- The Patents Act 1953 (No 64)
- The Patents Act 2013 (No 68)

=== United Kingdom ===
- The Patent Law Amendment Act 1852 (15 & 16 Vict. c. 83), which established the modern Patent Office
- The Patents Act 1901 (1 Edw. 7. c. 18)
- The Patents Act 1902 (2 Edw. 7. c. 34)
- The Patents and Designs (Amendment) Act 1907 (7 Edw. 7. c. 28)
- The Patents and Designs Act 1907 (7 Edw. 7. c. 29)
- The Patents and Designs Act 1914 (4 & 5 Geo. 5. c. 18)
- The Patents and Designs Act 1919 (9 & 10 Geo. 5. c. 80)
- The Patents and Designs (Convention) Act 1928 (18 & 19 Geo. 5. c. 3)
- The Patents and Designs Act 1932 (22 & 23 Geo. 5. c. 32)
- The Patents &c. (International Conventions) Act 1938 (1 & 2 Geo. 6. c. 29)
- The Patents and Designs (Limits of Time) Act 1939 (2 & 3 Geo. 6. c. 32)
- The Patents, Designs, Copyright and Trade Marks (Emergency) Act 1939 (2 & 3 Geo. 6. c. 107)
- The Patents and Designs Act 1942 (5 & 6 Geo. 6. c. 6)
- The Patents and Designs Act 1946 (9 & 10 Geo. 6. c. 44)
- The Patents and Designs Act 1949 (12, 13 & 14 Geo. 6. c. 62)
- The Patents Act 1949 (12, 13 & 14 Geo. 6. c. 87)
- The Patents Act 1957 (5 & 6 Eliz. 2. c. 13)
- The Patents and Designs (Renewals, Extensions and Fees) Act 1961 (9 & 10 Eliz. 2. c. 25)
- The Patents Act 1977 (c. 37), which aligned UK patent law with the European Patent Convention and effectively replaced the Patents Act 1949. "The main law governing the patents system in the UK". It established "new domestic law" within the patents field.
- The Patents, Designs and Marks Act 1986 (c. 39)
- The Copyright, Designs and Patents Act 1988 (c. 48)
- The Patents Act 2004 (c. 16), amended the Patents Act 1977 to give effect to the European Patent Convention 2000

The Patents, Designs, and Trade Marks Acts 1883 to 1888 was the collective title of the following acts:

- The Patents, Designs, and Trade Marks Act 1883 (46 & 47 Vict. c. 57)
- The Patents, Designs, and Trade Marks (Amendment) Act 1885 (48 & 49 Vict. c. 63)
- The Patents Act 1886 (49 & 50 Vict. c. 37)
- The Patents, Designs, and Trade Marks Act 1888 (51 & 52 Vict. c. 50)

=== United States ===
- The term Patent Act may refer to United States patent law, as a whole, or to:
- Patent Act of 1790
- Patent Act of 1793
- Patent Act of 1836
- Patent Act of 1870
- Patent Act of 1922
- Patent Act of 1952
- Patent and Trademark Law Amendments Act of 1980
- Patent Reform Act of 2005 (not enacted)
- Patent Reform Act of 2007 (not enacted)

== See also ==
- List of short titles
