= European Round Table on Patent Practice =

The European Round Table on Patent Practice (EUROTAB) is described as "a pan-European group consisting of lawyers (including European Patent Office (EPO) staff, and Commission, national patent offices) in the patent field", or a body where the national patent offices of the Contracting States of the European Patent Convention (EPC) and the European Patent Office come together to discuss differences in practice and see whether a harmonized approach is possible.

Along with the Standing Advisory Committee before the European Patent Office (SACEPO), a committee advising the European Patent Office on patent law issues, and the European Patent Judges' Symposium, EUROTAB is one of the most significant and institutionalised forums of legal professionals created and sponsored by the EPO. Already in the 1990s, "the strong interest and active participation of contracting states in these discussions confirm[ed] the growing importance of EUROTAB as an expert forum on patent practice in Europe".

== Meetings ==
- 1st, 6–7 April 1992, Munich, Germany
- 2nd, 22–23 April 1993, Taastrup, Denmark
- 3rd, 26–27 April 1994, Stockholm, Sweden
- 4th, 9–10 May 1995, Newport, United Kingdom
- 5th, 13–14 May 1996, Vienna, Austria
- 6th, 22–23 May 1997, Paris, France
- 7th, 28–29 May 1998, Lisbon, Portugal
- 8th, 20–21 May 1999, Munich, Germany
- 9th, 25–26 May 2000, Lyon, France
- 10th, 10–11 May 2001, Madrid, Spain
- 11th, 16–17 May 2002, Kilkenny, Ireland
- 12th, 15–16 May 2003, Berlin, Germany
- 13th, 13–14 May 2004, Budapest, Hungary
- 14th, 12–13 May 2005, Taastrup, Denmark
- 15th, 11–12 May 2006, Ljubljana, Slovenia
- 16th, 10–11 May 2007, Prague, Czech Republic
- 17th, 8–9 May 2008, Ankara, Turkey
- 18th, 7–8 May 2009, Warsaw, Poland
- 19th, 20–21 May 2010, Bucharest, Romania
- 20th, 26–27 May 2011, Munich, Germany
