= Federal courts of Switzerland =

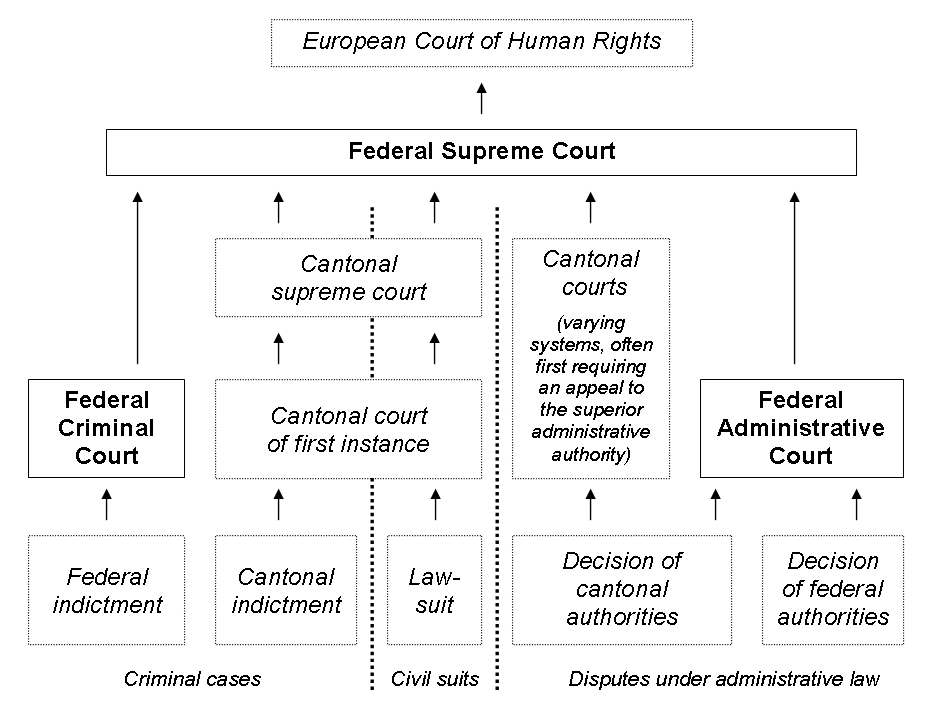
The federal judiciary within the Swiss legal system.

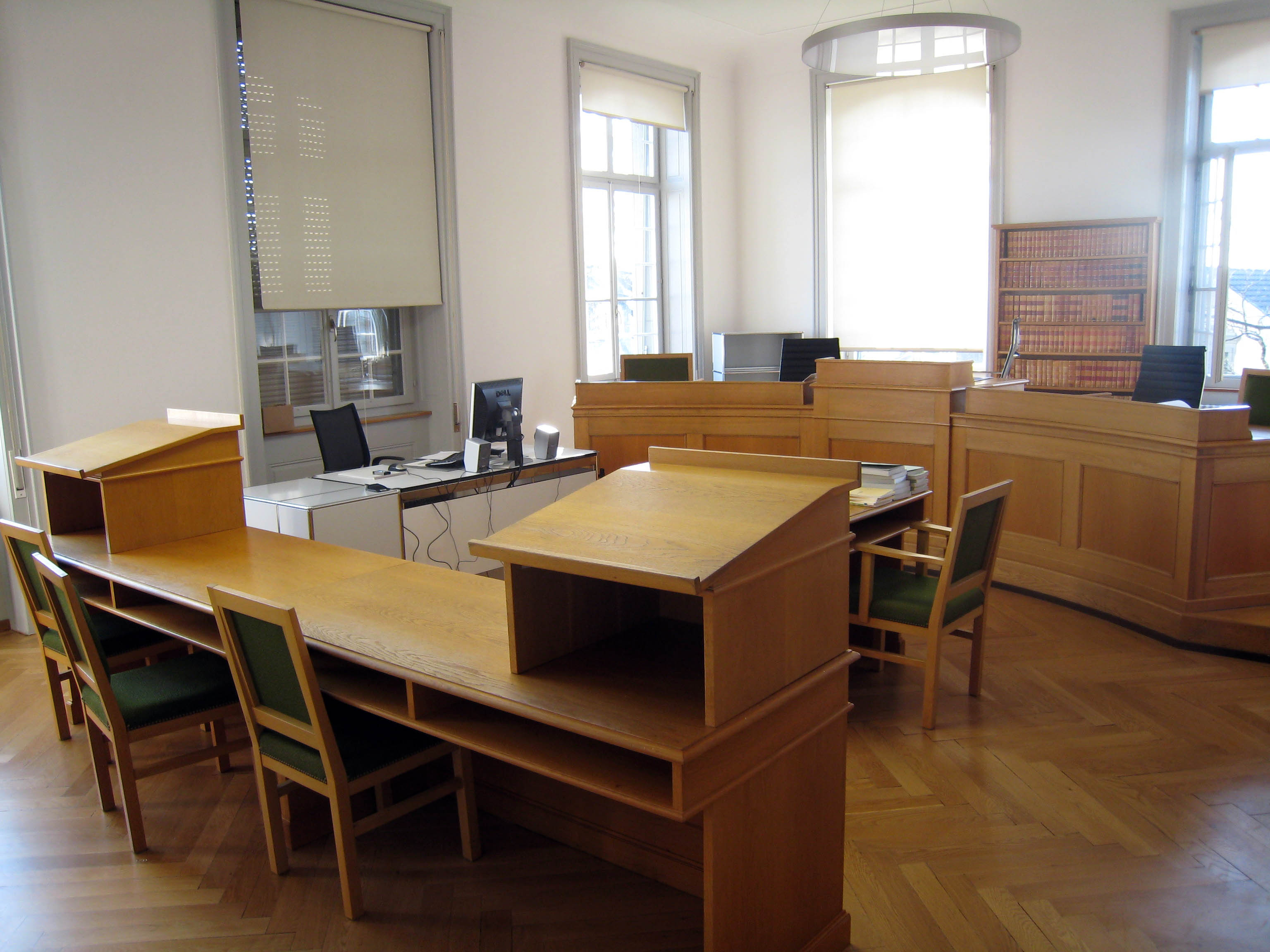
A small courtroom in the Supreme Court of the Canton of Bern.

The federal judiciary of Switzerland consists of four federal courts: the Federal Supreme Court in Lausanne and Lucerne; the Federal Criminal Court in Bellinzona; the Federal Patent Court and the Federal Administrative Court in St. Gallen. These courts are charged with the application of Swiss federal law through the judicial process.

The Federal Supreme Court in Lausanne is established in the Swiss Federal Constitution as the supreme judicial authority of Switzerland. It is the court of appeal for all decisions of the cantonal courts of last instance, and also for most decisions of the three federal courts of first instance.

The Federal Criminal Court in Bellinzona tries the (relatively few) criminal cases subject to federal criminal jurisdiction, such as cases involving organised crime, terrorism, and crimes against federal institutions. It also decides disputes between cantonal prosecuting authorities. The Federal Administrative Court in St. Gallen reviews decisions made in application of federal administrative law that have been issued by federal and in some cases by cantonal authorities. The Federal Patent Court of Switzerland is a specialized court, which started hearing patent cases in 2012, taking jurisdiction from the cantonal courts.
