= Patents Act 2004 =

Act of the Parliament of the United Kingdom

Patents Act 2004 (Note: Section 18(1).)
- Act of Parliament
- Parliament of the United Kingdom
- Long title: An Act to amend the law relating to patents.
- Citation: 2004 c. 16
- Introduced by: Lord Sainsbury of Turville (Lords)
- Territorial extent: United Kingdom (Note: Section 18(2). The act has the same extent as the Patents Act 1977.)

Dates
- Royal assent: 22 July 2004
- Commencement: Various (Note: Section 17.)
Other legislation
Amends	Patents Act 1977
Amended by	Intellectual Property (Enforcement, etc.) Regulations 2006

Status: Partially repealed

Text of statute as originally enacted

Text of the Patents Act 2004 as in force today (including any amendments) within the United Kingdom, from legislation.gov.uk.

The Patents Act 2004 (c. 16) is an act of the Parliament of the United Kingdom relating to patent law.

== Provisions ==
One of the purposes of the act is to give effect to the revised European Patent Convention which was agreed by Diplomatic Conference in November 2000. It also amended employees' rights to compensation for inventions, to enable employee compensation "to be awarded in respect of all outstanding benefits deriving from a patented invention, removing the requirement for an employee to show that the patent itself is of outstanding benefit".

The act also makes it easier for small and medium size businesses to enforce their rights. The act allows individuals to have access to an independent Patent Office "opinion" on the validity of their patent.

== Section 17 – Commencement etc ==
The following orders have been made under this section:

- The Patents Act 2004 (Commencement No. 1 and Consequential and Transitional Provisions) Order 2004 (S.I. 2004/2177 (C. 94))
- The Patents Act 2004 (Commencement No. 2 and Consequential, etc. and Transitional Provisions) Order 2004 (S.I. 2004/3205 (C. 140))
- The Patents Act 2004 (Commencement No. 3 and Transitional Provisions) Order 2005 (S.I. 2005/2471 (C. 105))
- The Patents Act 2004 (Commencement No. 4 and Transitional Provisions) Order 2007 (S.I. 2007/3396 (C. 144))

== See also ==
- Patent Act

== Bibliography ==
- Halsbury's Statutes
