= Fees in proceedings before the European Patent Office =

The fees due at the European Patent Office (EPO) in relation to a European patent application are laid out in the Rules relating to Fees of 20 October 1977, as adopted by decision of the Administrative Council of the European Patent Organisation of 7 December 2006 and as last amended by decision of the Administrative Council of 12 December 2018.

== Renewal fees ==
Renewal fees are payable to the EPO in respect of pending European patent applications in respect of the third year from the date of filing. These fees are paid in advance of the year in which they are due (such that the renewal fee for the third year falls due two years from the date of filing) and fall due on the last day of the month containing the anniversary of the date of filing. Renewal fees may not be validly paid more than three months before they fall due, except for the renewal fee in respect of the third year which may not be paid more than six months before it falls due.

If a renewal fee for a European patent application is not paid in due time, the renewal fee may still be validly paid within six months of the due date, provided that the additional fee provided by Rule 51(2) EPC is also paid within the six-month period. For the calculation of the six-month additional period, the so-called de ultimo ad ultimo rule is applied by the EPO. According to this rule, the six-month period runs "from the last day of the month to the last day of the month". For instance, if a renewal fee was due in February 2004, the additional fee fell due on August 31, 2004 (Tuesday), i.e. six months from the end of February 2004.

The obligation to pay renewal fees terminates with the payment of the renewal fee due in respect of the year in which the mention of the grant of the European patent is published. Subsequently, renewal fees are payable to the national offices of the EPC Contracting States in which the European patent is brought into effect. Each Contracting State then pays the European Patent Organisation a proportion of each renewal fee received for a European patent in that State.

Whereas for a pending European patent application an applicant must pay a single maintenance fee at the EPO, it may be much more costly to pay several maintenance fees to the several national patent offices for maintaining a granted European patent in a number of countries. This however depends on the number of countries in which the patent proprietor wants to maintain its European patent into force.

== Refund ==
Under certain circumstances, such as following the withdrawal of a European patent application or the withdrawal of an appeal, some fees that were paid may be refunded. This applies to search fees, the examination fee, and the appeal fee.

== Fee structure ==
The fee structure "does not necessarily reflect the actual workload imposed on the EPO in any individual case. Rather, legislators have chosen lump sums as fees that are for example independent of the number of auxiliary requests to be decided or the days allowed for conducting oral proceedings."
