= Standing Advisory Committee before the European Patent Office =

The Standing Advisory Committee before the European Patent Office (SACEPO, French: Comité consultatif permanent auprès de l'OEB, German: Ständiger Beratender Ausschuss beim EPA) is a committee advising the European Patent Office (EPO) on patent law issues.

In the context of the SACEPO meetings, the EPO meets users of the European patent system from industry, patent attorneys, and national patent offices to discuss mainly patent law issues. Along with the EUROTAB, a pan-European group consisting of lawyers in the patent field, and the European Patent Judges' Symposium, the SACEPO is one of the most significant and institutionalised forums of legal professionals created and sponsored by the EPO.
