= Patent court =

Court specializing in patent law

A patent court is a court specializing in patent law, or having substantially exclusive jurisdiction over patent law issues. In some systems, such courts also have jurisdiction over other areas of intellectual property law, such as copyright and trademark.

== By jurisdiction ==
=== European Union ===
- Unified Patent Court (UPC), a court for patent litigation in the participating countries of the European Union

=== Germany ===
- Federal Patent Court of Germany (German: Bundespatentgericht or BPatG)

=== Japan ===
- Intellectual Property High Court

=== Switzerland ===
- Federal Patent Court of Switzerland

=== United Kingdom ===
==== England and Wales ====
- Intellectual Property Enterprise Court, formerly Patents County Court
- Patents Court

=== United States ===
- United States Court of Appeals for the Federal Circuit (exercising jurisdiction formerly vested in the United States Court of Customs and Patent Appeals)

== See also ==
- Intellectual property organisation
- Patent office
