= Rote Taube =

Rote Taube ("Red Dove") is a landmark decision of the Federal Court of Justice of Germany (Bundesgerichtshof) (X ZB 15/67, 27 Mar. 1969), regarding the definition of a technical teaching ("a teaching to methodically utilize controllable natural forces to achieve a causal, perceivable result") in patent law.

German courts continued to refer to the Rote Taube decision in a wide variety of subsequent rulings, invoking it in very different ways. Although the decision does not mention the patentability of software at all, it has "developed into one of the most important rulings for the patenting of software".

In the literature on material law, it has been noted that the court's reasoning "subjected animal breeding methods entirely to the logic of a natural-scientific, materialistic worldview, so that living beings were obviously simply regarded as the sum of their 'chemical components', that is, as a 'composition of matter'". According to the same analysis, various courts have since distanced themselves from this argumentation - some more clearly than others - while others continue to follow it.
