= List of Hendrik Wade Bode patents =

This is a complete list of the twenty five patents issued by the U.S. Patent Office to Hendrik Wade Bode for his inventions. The broad areas of his patents include transmission networks, transformer systems, electric wave amplification, broadband amplifiers and artillery computing.

Patent number	Description	Date granted	Patent number	Description	Date granted
U.S. patent 1,814,238	Wave filter	July 14, 1931	U.S. patent 2,249,415	Wave Filter	July 15, 1941
U.S. patent 1,828,454	Transmission Network	October 20, 1931	U.S. patent 2,301,245	Transformer System	November 10, 1942
U.S. patent 1,944,209	Transmission Network	January 23, 1934	U.S. patent 2,315,040	Electric Wave Amplification	March 30, 1943
U.S. patent 1,955,788	Transmission Network	April 24, 1934	U.S. patent 2,337,965	Coupling Network	December 28, 1943
U.S. patent 2,001,090	Transmission Network	May 14, 1935	U.S. patent 2,342,638	Wave Transmission Network	February 20, 1944
U.S. patent 2,002,216	Wave filter	May 21, 1935	U.S. patent 2,367,711	Broad Band Amplifier	January 23, 1945
U.S. patent 2,029,014	Wave Transmission Network	January 28, 1936	U.S. patent 2,455,035	Averaging Mechanism	November 30, 1948
U.S. patent 2,029,698	Wave Transmission Network	February 4, 1936	U.S. patent 2,492,351	Smoothing Network	December 27, 1949
U.S. patent 2,035,258	Wave filter	March 24, 1936	U.S. patent 2,710,720	Artillery Computer	June 14, 1955 (filed October 28 1943)
U.S. patent 2,058,210	Wave Transmission Networks	October 20, 1936	U.S. patent 2,744,224	Automatic Curve Follower with Vibrating Stylus	May 1, 1956
U.S. patent 2,096,027	Attenuation Equalizer	October 19, 1937	U.S. patent 2,955,279	Selective Paging System	October 4, 1960
U.S. patent 2,123,178	Amplifier	July 12, 1938	U.S. patent 3,114,142	Selective Paging System	December 10, 1963
U.S. patent 2,242,878	Design of Broad Band Receivers	May 20, 1941			
