= European Patent Judges' Symposium =

The European Patent Judges' Symposium (French: Colloque des juges européens de brevets, German: Symposium europäischer Patentrichter) is a biennial symposium, with the claimed aim of providing a platform for national judges from legal systems with differing traditions to exchange experiences and to thereby promote mutual understanding in the development of European patent law.

Along with the Standing Advisory Committee before the European Patent Office (SACEPO), a committee advising the European Patent Office (EPO) on patent law issues, and the European Round Table on Patent Practice (EUROTAB), the European Patent Judges' Symposium is one of the most significant and institutionalised forums of legal professionals created and sponsored by the EPO.

== List ==
- 1st, 19–22 October 1982, Munich, Germany
- 2nd, 5–7 September 1984, Strasbourg, France
- 3rd, 3–5 September 1986, Vienna, Austria
- 4th, 7–9 September 1988, Lausanne-Dorigny, Switzerland
- 5th, 12–14 September 1990, Turin, Italy
- 6th, 8–11 September 1992, The Hague, Netherlands
- 7th, 6–9 September 1994, Newport, United Kingdom
- 8th, 17–20 September 1996, Stockholm, Sweden
- 9th, 6–9 October 1998, Madrid, Spain - Official Journal of the EPO (OJ EPO) 1999, Special edition
- 10th, 19–23 September 2000, Mondorf-les-Bains, Luxembourg - OJ EPO 2001, Special edition (pdf)
- 11th, 17–20 September 2002, Copenhagen, Denmark - OJ EPO 2003, Special edition No. 2 (pdf)
- 12th, 22–24 September 2004, Brussels, Belgium - OJ EPO, Special edition of the OJ EPO 2005 (pdf)
- 13th, 12–16 September 2006, Thessaloniki, Greece - OJ EPO, Special edition 2/2007 (pdf)
- 14th, 16–20 September 2008, Bordeaux, France - OJ EPO, Special edition 1/2009 (pdf)
- 15th, 15–17 September 2010, Lisbon, Portugal - OJ EPO Special edition 1/2011 (pdf)
- 16th, 5–7 September 2012, Dublin, Ireland - OJ EPO Special edition 1/2013 (pdf)
