= IPR-Helpdesk =

The IP Helpdesk (Note: Also spelled "IP Helpdesk" and also known as "European IP Helpdesk" and "Intellectual Property Helpdesk". See for example Webber, Sheila (April–May 2000). "European Developments in Intellectual Property". Bulletin of the American Society for Information Science. 26 (4). American Society for Information Science. Archived from the original on 4 January 2014. "The European Commission has set up an Intellectual Property Rights Helpdesk on the Internet.") is a project funded by the European Commission (EC) and a source and guide to patent information. The project was launched in 1998 (at the same time as Espacenet) to be a central reference point for intellectual property inquiries and advice throughout the European Union. The IPR-Helpdesk is a project implemented by "a European network consisting of several research institutes, law firms and consultancies." It notably offers a free-of-charge enquiry service, or "Helpline service", for addressing intellectual property issues, that is "targeted at researchers and European small and medium-sized enterprises (SMEs) participating in EU-funded collaborative research projects."

According to a 2005 OECD report, the IPR-Helpdesk "offers an example of what governments can do to help compensate for a lack of technology transfer competence among [public research organisations (PROs)]" and "has, since 1998, played a key role in building a culture of innovation in EU countries". The United Nations Economic Commission for Europe later reported, in 2011, that the IPR Helpdesk "not only benefits EU RTD participants, but also the wider research and SME communities".

The University of Alicante (Spain) was responsible for the FP5, FP7 and CIP IPR-Helpdesk editions from January 2001 to February 2011. From March 2011, a consortium formed by infeurope S.A. (a Luxembourg-based company), the Intellectual Property Institute of Luxembourg (a Luxembourg-based IP institute) and Eurice GmbH (a company based in Saarbrücken, Germany) is in charge of the project as a result of a European Commission's tender.
