= Invention promotion firm =

Firm offering services to inventors

An invention promotion firm or invention submission corporation provides services to inventors to help them in develop or market their inventions. These firms may offer to evaluate the patentability of inventions, file patent applications, build prototypes, license them to manufacturers, and otherwise market. They are distinguished from more conventional consulting firms and law firms offering the same or similar services in that they market their services primarily to amateur inventors through the mass media.

The US government estimates that hundreds of companies offer invention-promotion services and that “virtually all of them are either ineffective or outright fraudulent. One official at the U.S. Patent and Trademark Office says he believes there are fewer than a half-dozen legitimate invention promoters in the country”.

== Performance ==
Prior to the 1999 American Inventors Protection Act (AIPA), accurate statistics of the success rate of invention promotion firms were difficult to come by. Nonetheless, as a result of certain legal actions taken against some of these firms, overall success rates have come to light. One such firm, Davison Associates, disclosed that of 900 ideas where a client had a prototype built of their invention at an average cost of $11,000, only 30 of those inventions were licensed within 6 months. Of the inventions licensed, only 10 made more in license fees than the cost of the invention promotion services.

Between 2007 and 2009, the Pittsburgh-based promotional firm signed agreements with 5,336 clients resulting in 86 licensing agreements. Only 27 clients (0.5%) received more money from licensing fees than they paid for their services.

== Sources of revenue ==
Invention promotion firms generally make their money from fees charged to clients for services. These fees normally must be paid up front and a customer may be told that they may have very little time, such as three days or less, in order to make a decision. Invention promotion firms may also receive a portion of their fees as a share of the royalty that an inventor earns on his or her invention. The total fraction of an invention promotion firm's revenue obtained from royalties, however, may be less than 1%.

== US legal protections for inventors ==
After a massive fraud was being launched by a significant amount of invention promotion companies the 1999 American Inventors Protection Act (AIPA) established disclosure requirements for invention promotion firms. These disclosure requirements include:

- the total number of inventions evaluated by the invention promoter for commercial potential in the past 5 years, as well as the number of those inventions that received positive evaluations, and the number of those inventions that received negative evaluations;
- the total number of customers who have contracted with the invention promoter in the past 5 years, not including customers who have purchased trade show services, research, advertising, or other nonmarketing services from the invention promoter, or who have defaulted in their payment to the invention promoter;
- the total number of customers known by the invention promoter to have received a net financial profit as a direct result of the invention promotion services provided by such invention promoter;
- the total number of customers known by the invention promoter to have received license agreements for their inventions as a direct result of the invention promotion services provided by such invention promoter; and
- the names and addresses of all previous invention promotion companies with which the invention promoter or its officers have collectively or individually been affiliated in the previous 10 years.

The American Inventors Protection Act also provides civil penalties that can be assessed against invention promotion firms engaged in fraudulent or deceptive practices, defined by the FTC as "invention promotion scams".

The USPTO and the FTC both provide guidelines for finding legitimate invention development, prototyping and promotion firms, that comply with the AIPA.

== Legal actions against invention promotion firms ==
=== Invention Submission Corporation ===
In 1994, the FTC reached a settlement with Invention Submission Corporation, after a five-year investigation of claims that the company "misrepresented the nature, quality and success rate of the promotion services it sold to consumers." Under the terms of a consent decree, Invention Submission Corporation – now trading as – set aside $1.2 million for customer refunds.

=== Project Mousetrap ===
In 1997, the United States Federal Trade Commission (FTC) launched "Project Mousetrap" to identify, prosecute and fine firms engaged in fraudulent or deceptive practices, in what was alleged as a massive fraud by a significant amount of invention promotion firms.

In 1998 all of the accused parties except one settled with the FTC and a $250,000 redress fund was set up for inventors taken in by the firms. In 2006, judgment was rendered against Davison & Associates. They were fined $US 26 million to be used to compensate defrauded clients. Davison appealed the judgment, and then settled with the FTC for $10.7 million in 2008.

=== World Patent Marketing ===
In 2017, the company World Patent Marketing was shut down by the FTC. Members of the advisory board of the company included the 2018 acting United States Attorney General Matthew Whitaker, Republican Congressman Brian Mast, and the scientist Ronald Mallett.

== Public posting of complaints against invention promotion firms ==
The United States Patent and Trademark Office (USPTO) posts complaints online from dissatisfied clients of invention promotion firms and provides an opportunity for invention promotion firms to respond to the complaints. The USPTO, however, does not investigate the validity of any of the complaints or responses.

== Guidelines for identifying unscrupulous firms ==
Both the USPTO and the US Federal Trade Commission publish guidelines on how inventors can better determine if an invention promotion firm is scrupulous or not. Signs of an unscrupulous invention promotion firm include:

- Exaggerated claims about the market potential of the invention
- Refusal to offer advice in writing
- Request for money immediately and upfront.

== See also ==
- Intellectual property brokering
- Licensing Executives Society International
- Scams in intellectual property
