= Chemical patent =

Patent for an invention in the chemical or pharmaceuticals industry

Example of a Markush structure

A chemical patent, pharmaceutical patent or drug patent is a patent for an invention in the chemical or pharmaceuticals industry. Strictly speaking, in most jurisdictions, there are essentially no differences between the legal requirements to obtain a patent for an invention in the chemical or pharmaceutical fields, in comparison to obtaining a patent in the other fields, such as in the mechanical field. A chemical patent or a pharmaceutical patent is therefore not a sui generis right, i.e. a special legal type of patent.

Chemical patent claims often use generic, Markush structures contained within them, named after the inventor Eugene Markush who won a lawsuit in the US in 1925 to allow such structures to be used in patent claims. These generic structures are used to make the patent claim as broad as possible.

In the United States, patents on pharmaceuticals were considered unethical by the medical profession during most of the nineteenth-century. Drug patent terms in the US were extended from 17 to 20 years in 1994.

Pharmaceutical patents are typically more valuable than any other type of patents, and thus play an essential role in the pharmaceutical industry. There are several reasons for this peculiarity:

1. the cost of research and development and getting an approval of a new medication, as well as the risk (failure rate) in developing a new pharmaceutical ingredient, is orders of magnitude higher than the cost of developing most other products.
2. on the other hand, the cost of making a known chemical is substantially lower, than the cost of developing a new pharmaceutical.
3. the patent monopoly of pharmaceuticals is usually policed by the government (FDA in the US), but in other industries the patent owner has to bear substantial expenses to enforce its patent monopoly.

A 2021 analysis of the most valuable US pharmaceutical patents published in the Orange Book between 2000 and 2018 showed that ca. 25% of these patents end up litigated in courts, but only 26% of these litigated patents are invalidated, well below the overall patent invalidation rate of 43%. 94% of these invalidated patents are not the highly innovative “primary’ patents on the active ingredient, but weaker follow-on patents (that claim changes in formulation, dissolution profile, new use), that should have not been allowed by examiners in the first place. Remarkably, the prosecution histories of most of these invalidated patents share striking similarity in having the same assignees, the same prosecuting attorneys, and the same examiners. Examiners approve litigated patents after having issued fewer office actions than they do with unlitigated patents. For litigated patents it takes approximately five office actions before allowance. In contrast, for the average, it takes approximately eight office actions before an allowance.

The main reason for invalidating these weak follow-up patents in courts is obviousness in view of the prior art, which was not considered by the examiner. Nevertheless, the authors conclude, that "having examiners spend more time on the important patents ... is not likely to help much; examiners who get more time to work on important cases now do not do more work, but instead cut and paste their existing work from prior cases." As a better alternative, the authors suggests, that the patent owners identify in advance, which patents they intend to list in the Orange Book, and have these patents examined by USPTO's Central Reexamination Unit with a higher level of scrutiny than regular examiners do.

== See also ==
- Compulsory licensing (patents)
- Criticism of pharmaceutical patents
- Evergreening
- Generic drug
- Supplementary protection certificate
