= Intellectual property brokering =

An intellectual property broker mediates between the buyer and seller of intellectual property (IP) and may manage the many steps in the process of creating a deal with regard to the purchase, sale, license, or marketing of intellectual property assets. This may include patents, trademarks, or inventions (prototypes).

== Purpose ==
Inventors are faced with several alternatives to making their invention a commercial success. They can build their own start up company from scratch using their own resources. In the United States, they can seek government grants; SBIR (Small Business Innovative Research) and (TTR) Technology Transfer Research to fund the early stage development of their technology. They can contract with third parties such as venture capital or angel investors to finance a startup or they can sell or license their products to an existing and established company. Often inventors are interested in expanding their own intellectual property assets through licensing and acquisitions.

Because there is not a well defined market around the buying and selling of patents or other IP assets, if an inventor or patent owner wants to monetize their asset, an intellectual property broker can help by serving to connect the inventor or patent owner with one or more interested buyers. The broker should have a network of connections in various market segments which can be used to help market the patent being sold. Potential buyers may include industry peers, competitors, entrepreneurs looking to commercialize the technology, but also defensive patent aggregators, and patent licensing companies.

A competent broker should be able to explain to the inventor or patent owner the spectrum of values that may be assessed to a patent depending on the situation or motivation of the buyer in the market. In addition, in bringing buyers and sellers together, an intellectual property broker may provide any or all of the following services:

- initial due diligence (part of Intellectual property analytics)
- technology assessment
- market analysis
- value analysis
- competitive analysis
- lead development
- introductions
- lead management
- contract negotiations
- relationship management

== Patent brokers market ==
The estimated number of patent brokers varies greatly. For example, a 1999 World Intellectual Property Organization WIPO paper estimated 500 patent brokers in the United States. An October 2015 report estimated 61 brokerages.

In 2016, it was estimated that of all the brokered patent packages brought to market only 21% of them sell. Average asking price per patent asset was $197K in 2016. 137 people were estimated to be employed in the brokered patent market.

The estimated size of the brokered patent market was $290 million in 2020, down from $300 million in 2019.

The company Ocean Tomo facilitates auctions of patents and other forms intellectual property.

== See also ==
- Invention promotion firm
- Patent troll
