= Patent Reform Act =

The Patent Reform Act may refer to:

- The Patent Reform Act of 2005, an unenacted bill introduced in the 109th United States Congress
- The Patent Reform Act of 2007, an unenacted bill introduced in the 110th United States Congress
- The Patent Reform Act of 2009, an unenacted bill introduced in the 111th United States Congress
- The Patent Reform Act of 2011, a bill introduced in the 112th United States Congress
