= Patent portfolio =

A patent portfolio is a collection of patents owned by a single entity, such as an individual or corporation. The patents may be related or unrelated. Patent applications may also be regarded as included in a patent portfolio.

The monetary benefits of a patent portfolio include a market monopoly position for the portfolio holder and revenue from licensing the intellectual property. Non-monetary benefits include strategic advantages like first-mover advantages and defense against rival portfolio holders. Constituting a patent portfolio may also be used to encourage investment.

Because patents have a fixed lifespan (term of patent), elements of a portfolio of patents constantly expire and enter the public domain.

== Market value and evaluation ==
The value of a corporation's patent portfolio can be a significant fraction of the overall value of the corporation. Ocean Tomo LLC, for example, maintains an index of corporations whose market value is governed in large part by their patent portfolio value. The index is called "Ocean Tomo 300 Patent Index".

Another example is IPscore—acquired in 2006 by the European Patent Office—a software application, developed by the Danish Patent and Trademark Office. The application estimates "the economic value of patents and development projects".

=== Patent portfolio valuation ===
Because patent portfolios can contain hundreds, sometimes thousands, of patents, companies that wish to license a patent portfolio often must negotiate without complete information. In many cases, it is too costly for the negotiating parties to assess the validity and value of each of the portfolio's individual patents. Instead, parties will attempt to set a royalty that, over time, "converges on an objective probabilistic assessment of the portfolio's value."

== See also ==
- Intellectual property valuation
- Patent holding company
- Patent map
- Patent monetization
- Patent pool
- Patent thicket
- Patent troll
