= Eurasian Patent Convention =

- Parties (purple), former parties (green) and signatories that did not ratify (blue)
- Signed: 9 September 1994
- Location: Moscow, Russia
- Effective: 12 August 1995
- Condition: Ratification by three States
- Signatories: 10
- Parties: 8 (Armenia, Azerbaijan, Belarus, Russia, Kyrgyzstan, Kazakhstan, Tajikistan, Turkmenistan)
- Depositary: Director-General of WIPO
- Language: Russian

The Eurasian Patent Convention (EAPC; Russian: Евразийская патентная конвенция) is an international patent law treaty instituting both the Eurasian Patent Organization (EAPO) and the legal system pursuant to which Eurasian patents are granted. It was signed on 9 September 1994 in Moscow, Russia, and entered into force on 12 August 1995.

== History ==
After the Collapse of the Soviet Union, its successor states had no system for protection of intellectual property. A common patent system was conceived in a convention which was signed on 27 December 1991, but never entered into force. This system would provide for a true unitary patent that "may be granted, assigned or canceled in the territory of all the Contracting States with due regard to the invention patentability criteria provided for in the USSR legislation". The second version of the convention went less far: in line with the European Patent Convention, it provided for a single evaluation phase, but after approval, it would be converted in a bundle of national patents.

== States parties ==
The convention was signed by 10 states in 1994, 8 of which became members one year later upon ratification.

Country	Signature	Ratification/Accession	Denunciation
Armenia	9 September 1994	27 November 1995	
Azerbaijan	9 September 1994	25 September 1995	
Belarus	9 September 1994	8 May 1995	
Georgia	9 September 1994		
Kazakhstan	9 September 1994	4 August 1995	
Kyrgyzstan	9 September 1994	13 October 1995	
Moldova	9 September 1994	16 November 1995	26 April 2012
Russia	9 September 1994	27 June 1995	
Tajikistan	9 September 1994	12 May 1995	
Turkmenistan		1 March 1995	
Ukraine	9 September 1994		

== Opposition ==
An opposition can be filed against a Eurasian patent granted under the provisions of the Eurasian Patent Convention within six months from the publication of the granted patent.

== Statistics ==
"Between 1996 and the end of 2015, approximately 43 700 Eurasian applications were filed and 22 700 Eurasian patents were granted at the EAPO."

== See also ==
- European Patent Convention (EPC)
