= Patent infringement =

Breach of the rights conferred by a patent

Patent infringement is an unauthorized act of — for example — making, using, offering for sale, selling, or importing for these purposes a patented product. Where the subject-matter of the patent is a process, infringement involves the act of using, offering for sale, selling or importing for these purposes at least the product obtained by the patented process. In other words, patent infringement is the commission of a prohibited act with respect to a patented invention without permission from the patent holder. Permission may typically be granted in the form of a license. The definition of patent infringement may vary by jurisdiction.

The scope of the patented invention or the extent of protection is defined in the claims of the granted patent. In other words, the terms of the claims inform the public of what is not allowed without the permission of the patent holder.

Patents are territorial, and infringement is only possible in a country where a patent is in force. For example, if a patent is granted in the United States, then anyone in the United States is prohibited from making, using, selling or importing the patented item, while people in other countries may be free to exploit the patented invention in their country. The scope of protection may vary from country to country, because the patent is examined – or in some countries not substantively examined – by the patent office in each country or region and may be subject to different patentability requirements.

== Overview ==
Typically, a party (other than the patentee or licensee of the patentee) that manufactures, imports, uses, sells, or offers for sale patented technology without permission/license from the patentee, during the term of the patent and within the country that issued the patent, is considered to infringe the patent.

To determine if a patent has been infringed, a specific test is used. The test varies from country to country, but in general it requires that the infringing party's product (or method, service, and so on) falls within one or more of the (independent) claims of the patent. The process employed involves "reading" a claim onto the technology of interest. If all of the claim's elements are found in the technology, the claim is said to "read on" the technology; if a single element from the claim is missing from the technology, the claim does not literally read on the technology and the technology generally does not infringe the patent with respect to that claim, except if the doctrine of equivalents is considered applicable.

In response to allegations of infringement, an accused infringing party typically asserts one or more of the following:

- that it was not practicing the patented invention, i.e. the invention claimed in the patent (the claims define the extent of protection conferred by a patent);
- that it was not performing any infringing act in the territory covered by the patent (patents are indeed territorial in nature);
- that the patent has expired (since patents have a limited patent term, i.e. a limited lifetime);
- that the patent (or the particular claim(s) alleged to be infringed) is invalid, because the invention in question does not meet the patentability requirements or includes a formal defect, this rendering the patent invalid or unenforceable;
- that it has obtained a license under the patent.

The parties may also resolve their dispute in a settlement, which may involve a licensing agreement, such as a cross-licensing agreement. Private settlements may not always serve the public interest, "because litigating patent disputes to completion tends to generate positive externalities, by clarifying the limits of patent protection if the patent is upheld or encouraging wider use of the innovation if the patent is invalidated".

=== Indirect infringement ===
In certain jurisdictions, there is a particular case of patent infringement called "indirect infringement." Indirect infringement can occur, for instance, when a device is claimed in a patent and a third party supplies a product which can only be reasonably used to make the claimed device.

== Clearance searches and opinions ==
A clearance search, also called freedom-to-operate (FTO) search or infringement search, is a search done on issued patents or on pending patent applications to determine if a product or process infringes any of the claims of the issued patents or pending patent applications. A clearance search may also include expired art that acts as a 'safe harbor' permitting the product or process to be used based on patents in the public domain. These searches are often performed by one or more professional patent searchers who are under the direction of one or more patent attorneys.

Clearance searches may also be performed on a regular basis (e.g., monthly) if an individual is concerned about patenting activity in a particular industry or with respect to a particular product.

A clearance search can be followed by a clearance opinion, i.e. a legal opinion provided by one or more patent attorneys as to whether a given product or process infringes the claims of one or more issued patents or pending patent applications. Clearance opinions may be done in combination with a "validity and enforceability" opinion. A validity and enforceability opinion is a legal opinion as to whether a given patent is valid and/or enforceable. In other words, a validity opinion is a legal opinion or letter in which a patent attorney or patent agent analyzes an issued patent and provides an opinion on how a court might rule on its validity or enforceability. Validity opinions are often sought before litigation related to a patent. The average cost of a validity opinion (according to one 2007 survey) is over $15,000, with an infringement analysis adding $13,000.

The cost of these opinions for U.S. patents can run from tens to hundreds of thousands of dollars (or more) depending upon the particular patent, the number of defenses and prior art references, the length of the prosecution file history, and the complexity of the technology in question.

An exculpatory opinion (setting forth reasons the patent is not infringed, or providing other defenses such as prior use, intervening rights, or prior invention) is also possible.

== Patent infringement insurance ==
Patent infringement insurance is an insurance policy provided by one or more insurance companies to protect either an inventor or a third party from the risks of inadvertently infringing a patent.

In June 2006, a Study for the European Commission on the feasibility of possible insurance schemes against patent litigation risks was published. The report concluded that the continuation of the status quo with very little, disproportionately expensive, bespoke patent litigation insurance (PLI) would not meet any objectives for a feasible insurance scheme. Instead, only a mandatory scheme was considered to be viable in order to provide the economic and technical benefits to the EU and individual patentees which would arise from a widespread PLI scheme.

== Legislation ==
=== Australia ===
In Australia, a patent infringement occurs when a person, who is not the patentee, exploits or authorises another person to exploit the patent in question.

'Exploit' in this context includes:

- (i) Make, hire, sell or otherwise dispose of a patented product; or
- (ii) Offer to make, sell, hire or otherwise dispose of a patented product; or
- (iii) Use or import a patented product; or
- (iv) Keep it for the purposes of doing (i), (ii) or (iii); or
- (v) Use a patented method or process; or
- (vi) Do any act mentioned from (i) to (iv) above in respect of a product resulting from the use of a patented method or process.

=== Canada ===
In Canada, patents are governed by the Patent Act, and the rights of a patent holder are summarized at s. 42:

42. Every patent granted under this Act shall contain the title or name of the invention, with a reference to the specification, and shall, subject to this Act, grant to the patentee and the patentee's legal representatives for the term of the patent, from the granting of the patent, the exclusive right, privilege and liberty of making, constructing, using the invention and selling it to others to be used, subject to adjudication in respect thereof before any court of competent jurisdiction.

By granting the patent holder the exclusive right, privilege and liberty of making, constructing, using, and selling the invention, the Act establishes that any other person making, constructing, using, or selling the patented invention is infringing that patent. Whether there has been an infringement of a patent is usually a question of fact.

Canada is considered to be more friendly for rights holders in pursuing patent claims than in the United States, due to significant differences between the two jurisdictions:

- Patents in Canada are subject to a purposive construction, which relies on reading both the claims and the specifications to determine the scope of a patent, and extrinsic evidence is not permitted, leading to the absence of prosecution history estoppel.
- While US patent trials are heard by a jury, Canadian trials are heard by a judge only, and thus the claims of a Canadian patent are construed only once as part of the trial judge's decision on the merits of the case as a whole. In that regard, the Federal Court of Appeal has ruled that Markman hearings are not allowed under Canadian law.
- In Canada, the applicant has no obligation to disclose material prior art, so patents cannot be invalidated on that basis.
- The same absence of obligation also means that the Competition Act will not come into play, unlike what occurs with antitrust law in the US.
- The Canadian discovery process is more streamlined than the US procedure, resulting in less cost and time in pursuing the lawsuit, and it also possesses an implied undertaking rule, barring use of information produced or disclosed in discovery from any purpose other than the present litigation (other than by leave of the court).
- Canadian law allows a plaintiff to elect to claim either compensatory damages or an accounting of profits, which can either act as a deterrent on infringement or as an incentive to reach a settlement before trial.
- The availability of costs in Canadian courts is a significant advantage to a plaintiff confident of success, but is also a deterrent to pursuing more speculative cases.
- Treble damages are not awarded in Canadian courts, and punitive damages are less likely to be awarded.

=== China ===
China has been criticized in recent years for alleged patent infringement, especially achieved through trade secret theft. The Chinese Communist Party Central Committee General Office's most recent legal policy framework, declares a policy mandate for future patent law to ramp up punitive damages for patent infringement. Furthermore, it establishes framework principles for new regulations that place egregious infringers on a blacklist.

=== Europe ===
In Europe, national courts are competent for adjudicating patent infringement of national patents, national parts of European patents and Eurasian patents when the infringement takes place on their territory. Jurisdiction is determined for the countries in the European Economic Area by the Brussels regime, which means that for those countries also the court of the residence of the infringer is competent.

For the 17 countries participating in the Unified Patent Court (UPC), that court is competent for European patents in the same way as the national courts are, unless they are opted out. The UPC is furthermore competent for hearing cases regarding infringement of unitary patents, alongside the EEA courts of non-UPC countries (e.g. Spain, Norway) if the defendant has his residence/place of business there.

=== India ===
The Indian Patents Act 1970 does not specifically define activities that constitute infringement of patents. However, the following acts are deemed to be infringements according to the Patent Act:

- Mechanical equivalents;
- Carrying essential features of the invention;
- Immaterial variation in the invention; and
- The colorable imitation of the invention.

=== Japan ===
Infringement under the patent law in Japan is defined by Article 68 and Article 101 of Patent Act (Act No. 121 of 1959). Article 68 sets out the following types of infringement:

- Where the invention is a product, by making, using, assigning, etc., importing, exporting or offering for assignment, etc. of the product as a business.
- Where the invention is a process, by using as a business.
- Where the invention is a process to obtain a product, by making, using, assigning, etc., importing, exporting or offering for assignment, etc. of the product as a business.

Article 101 shows the following acts shall be deemed to constitute infringement of a patent right or an exclusive license:

- (i) where a patent has been granted for an invention of a product, acts of producing, assigning, etc., importing or offering for assignment, etc. any product to be used exclusively for the producing of the said product as a business;
- (ii) where a patent has been granted for an invention of a product, acts of producing, assigning, etc., importing or offering for assignment, etc. any product (excluding those widely distributed within Japan) to be used for the producing of the said product and indispensable for the resolution of the problem by the said invention as a business, knowing that the said invention is a patented invention and the said product is used for the working of the invention;
- (iii) where a patent has been granted for an invention of a process, acts of producing, assigning, etc., importing or offering for assignment, etc. any product to be used exclusively for the use of the said process as a business; and
- (iv) where a patent has been granted for an invention of a process, acts of producing, assigning, etc., importing or offering for assignment, etc. any product (excluding those widely distributed within Japan) to be used for the use of the said process and indispensable for the resolution of the problem by the said invention, knowing that the said invention is a patented invention and the said product is used for the working of the invention as a business.

=== United Kingdom ===
Infringement under United Kingdom patent law is defined by Section 60 of the UK Patents Act 1977 (as amended), which sets out the following types of infringement:

- Where the invention is a product, by the making, disposing of, offering to dispose of, using, importing or keeping a patented product.
- Where the invention is a process, by the use, or offer for use where it is known that the use of the process would be an infringement. Also, by the disposal of, offer to dispose of, use or import of a product obtained directly by means of that process, or the keeping of any such product whether for disposal or otherwise.
- By the supply, or offer to supply, in the United Kingdom, a person not entitled to work the invention, with any of the means, relating to an essential element of the invention, for putting the invention into effect, when it is known (or it is reasonable to expect such knowledge) that those means are suitable for putting, and are intended to put, the invention into effect in the United Kingdom.

=== United States ===
In United States law, an infringement may occur where the defendant has made, used, sold, offered to sell, or imported an infringing invention or its equivalent. One also commits indirect infringement if he actively and knowingly induces another to infringe, and is liable for that infringement. Types of "indirect infringement" include "contributory infringement" and "induced infringement."

No infringement action may be started until the patent is issued. However, pre-grant protection is available under 35 U.S.C. § 154(d), which allows a patent owner to obtain reasonable royalty damages for certain infringing activities that occurred before patent's date of issuance. This right to obtain provisional damages requires a patent holder to show that (1) the infringing activities occurred after the publication of the patent application, (2) the patented claims are substantially identical to the claims in the published application, and (3) the infringer had "actual notice" of the published patent application.

Patent infringement cases are decided exclusively by Federal, rather than by State, courts. A court can impose one or more of the following remedies:

- an injunction, i.e. an order to stop an infringing act. If an injunction order is not followed, the infringer can be criminally charged with contempt of court. Preliminary injunction can be imposed before trial in order to end the infringing activity immediately. However, since 2006 an injunction is available only under limited circumstances, as prescribed by the SCOTUS in eBay v. MercExchange. According to this ruling, in order to have a preliminary injunction issued by a judge, the plaintiff must show
1. that it has suffered irreparable injury (note: "has suffered" not "will suffer"),
2. that remedies at law (e.g., monetary damages) are inadequate,
3. that a balancing of hardships favors a grant of injunction, and
4. that the public interest would "not be disserved" by the grant of a preliminary injunction.

The Court issued this decision in order to reduce the impact of patent lawsuits initiated by non-practicing entities, such as patent trolls or universities acting like patent trolls.

- reasonable royalty remedy is available in most patent infringement cases. Since 1971, this remedy is controlled by Federal Circuit precedent in Georgia-Pacific Corp. v. United States Plywood Corp.

In the US there are safe harbor provisions to use a patented invention for the purposes of gathering data for a regulatory submission.

== "Piracy" ==
Since the 1840s, the expression "patent pirate" has been used as a pejorative term to describe those that infringe a patent and refuse to acknowledge the priority of the inventor. Samuel F. B. Morse, inventor of the telegraph, for example, complained in a letter to friend in 1848

I have been so constantly under the necessity of watching the movements of the most unprincipled set of pirates I have ever known, that all my time has been occupied in defense, in putting evidence into something like legal shape that I am the inventor of the Electro-Magnetic Telegraph!! Would you have believed it ten years ago that a question could be raised on that subject?

The term "pirate" has also been used to describe patent owners that vigorously enforce their patents. Thus whether one deliberately infringes a patent or whether one vigorously enforces a patent, they may be referred to as a pirate by those that feel they are overstepping their bounds.

== Threat to bring a patent infringement action ==
"A threat to bring a patent infringement action is highly likely to influence the commercial conduct of the person threatened, which is why the law of some countries, including the UK, provides that the making of a groundless threat to sue is, within certain carefully prescribed limits, an actionable wrong in itself." This however is not the case in the United States.

== See also ==
- Anton Piller order (common procedure in certain countries to obtain proofs of infringement)
- Cease and desist order
- Copyright infringement
- Divided infringement
- Industrial espionage
- Inequitable conduct
- Patent court
- Patent retaliation (clause)
- Smartphone patent licensing and litigation
- Saisie-contrefaçon
- Software hoarding
- Stick licensing

=== Notable infringement cases ===
- Monsanto Canada Inc. v. Schmeiser - A Canadian farmer sued for growing canola seed patented by Monsanto.
- Apple Inc. v. Samsung Electronics Co., Ltd.
- Microsoft Corp. v. Motorola Inc.
- Immersion v. Sony
