= Criticism of patents =

Intellectual property analysis

Legal scholars, economists, activists, policymakers, industries, and trade organizations have held differing views on patents and engaged in contentious debates on the subject. Critical perspectives emerged in the nineteenth century that were especially based on the principles of free trade. Contemporary criticisms have echoed those arguments, claiming that patents block innovation and waste resources that could otherwise be used productively, and also block access to an increasingly important "commons" of enabling technologies (a phenomenon called the tragedy of the anticommons), apply a "one size fits all" model to industries with differing needs, that is especially unproductive for industries other than chemicals and pharmaceuticals and especially unproductive for the software industry. Enforcement by patent trolls of poor quality patents has led to criticism of the patent office as well as the system itself. Patents on pharmaceuticals have also been a particular focus of criticism, as the high prices they enable puts life-saving drugs out of reach of many people. Alternatives to patents have been proposed, such as Joseph Stiglitz's suggestion of providing "prize money" (from a "prize fund" sponsored by the government) as a substitute for the lost profits associated with abstaining from the monopoly given by a patent.

These debates are part of a larger discourse on intellectual property protection which also reflects differing perspectives on copyright.

== History ==
Criticism of patents reached an early peak in Victorian Britain between 1850 and 1880, in a campaign against patenting that expanded to target copyright too and, in the judgment of historian Adrian Johns, "remains to this day the strongest [campaign] ever undertaken against intellectual property", coming close to abolishing patents. Its most prominent activists – Isambard Kingdom Brunel, William Robert Grove, William Armstrong and Robert A. MacFie – were inventors and entrepreneurs, and it was also supported by radical laissez-faire economists (The Economist published anti-patent views), law scholars, scientists (who were concerned that patents were obstructing research) and manufacturers. Johns summarizes some of their main arguments as follows:

[Patents] projected an artificial idol of the single inventor, radically denigrated the role of the intellectual commons, and blocked a path to this commons for other citizens – citizens who were all, on this account, potential inventors too. [...] Patentees were the equivalent of squatters on public land – or better, of uncouth market traders who planted their barrows in the middle of the highway and barred the way of the people.

Similar debates took place during that time in other European countries such as France, Prussia, Switzerland and the Netherlands (but not in the United States). However, in the United States patents on medicines were controversial before 1900 among physicians because they considered them unethical.

Based on the criticism of patents as state-granted monopolies perceived to be inconsistent with free trade, the Netherlands abolished patents in 1869 (having established them in 1817) – but later reversed the action and reintroduced them in 1912. In Switzerland, criticism of patents delayed the introduction of patent laws until 1907.

== Contemporary arguments ==
Contemporary arguments have focused on ways that patents can slow innovation by: blocking researchers' and companies' access to basic, enabling technology, and particularly following the explosion of patent filings in the 1990s, through the creation of "patent thickets"; wasting productive time and resources fending off enforcement of low-quality patents that should not have existed, particularly by "patent trolls"; and wasting money on patent litigation. Patents on pharmaceuticals have been a particular focus of criticism, as the high prices they enable puts life-saving drugs out of reach of many people.

=== Blocking innovation ===
"[Patents] serve merely to stifle progress, entrench the positions of giant corporations and enrich those in the legal profession, rather than the actual inventors."

— Elon Musk

The most general argument against patents is that "intellectual property" in all its forms represents an effort to claim something that should not be owned, and harms society by slowing innovation and wasting resources.

Law professors Michael Heller and Rebecca Sue Eisenberg have described an ongoing tragedy of the anticommons with regard to the proliferation of patents in the field of biotechnology, wherein intellectual property rights have become so fragmented that, effectively, no one can take advantage of them as to do so would require an agreement between the owners of all of the fragments.

Some public campaigns for improving access to medicines and genetically modified food have expressed a concern for "preventing the over-reach" of intellectual property protection including patent protection, and "to retain a public balance in property rights". Some economists and scientists and law professors have raised concerns that patents retard technical progress and innovation. Others claim that patents have had no effect on research, based on surveys of scientists.

In a 2008 publication, Yi Quan of the Kellogg School of Management concluded that the imposition of pharmaceutical patents under the TRIPS Agreement did not increase innovation in the pharmaceutical industry. The publication also said there appeared to be an optimal level of patent protection that increased domestic innovation.

=== Theory of innovation ===
The theory of patent law assumes that most innovation is driven by individuals working alone. Mark Lemley rebuts this with well-documented evidence that most inventions are developed simultaneously by several independent teams and that the actual implementation in the US does not reflect this theory. He also notes that at least 90% of patent infringement lawsuits are against researchers working independently from the plaintiff, not copiers of the plaintiff's invention. In the theory's stead, he proposes either abolishing patent law or a new legal theory based on promoting a race to develop a new technology. The Copyright Clause of the US Constitution, which moved jurisdiction over intellectual property from the states (under the Articles of Confederation) to the federal government, was motivated by competing patent claims on the steamboat under the previous patent system.

=== Poor patent quality and patent trolls ===
Patents have also been criticized for being granted on already-known inventions, with some complaining in the United States that the USPTO fails "to do a serious job of examining patents, thus allowing bad patents to slip through the system." On the other hand, some argue that because of low number of patents going into litigation, increasing quality of patents at patent prosecution stage increases overall legal costs associated with patents, and that current USPTO policy is a reasonable compromise between full trial on examination stage on one hand, and pure registration without examination, on the other hand. Also, the US offers several options to challenge the validity of (or to correct) an issued patent without going to court, such as a postgrant review within 9 months after issuance, inter partes review following 9 month after issuance, ex parte reexamination, supplemental examination and reissue.

Enforcement of patents – especially patents perceived as being overly broad – by patent trolls, has brought criticism of the patent system, though some commentators suggest that patent trolls are not bad for the patent system at all but instead realign market participant incentives, make patents more liquid, and clear the patent market.

Some patents granted in Russia have been denounced as pseudoscientific (for example, health-related patents using lunar phase or religious icons).

=== Litigation costs ===
According to James Bessen, the costs of patent litigation exceed their investment value in all industries except chemistry and pharmaceuticals. For example, in the software industry, litigation costs are twice the investment value. Bessen and Meurer also note that software and business model litigation accounts for a disproportionate share (almost 40 percent) of patent litigation cost, and the poor performance of the patent system negatively affects these industries.

=== Different industries but one law ===
Richard Posner noted that the most controversial feature of US patent law is that it covers all industries in the same way, but not all industries benefit from the time-limited monopoly a patent provides in order to spur innovation. He said that while the pharmaceutical industry is "poster child" for the need for a twenty-year monopoly, since costs to bring to a market are high, the time of development is often long, and the risks are high, in other industries like software the cost and risk of innovation is much lower and the cycle of innovation is quicker, and obtaining and enforcing patents and defending against patent litigation is generally a waste of resources in those industries.

=== Pharmaceutical patents ===
Some have raised ethical objections specifically with respect to pharmaceutical patents and the high prices for medication that they enable their proprietors to charge, which poor people in the developed world, and developing world, cannot afford. Critics also question the rationale that exclusive patent rights and the resulting high prices are required for pharmaceutical companies to recoup the large investments needed for research and development. One study concluded that marketing expenditures for new drugs often doubled the amount that was allocated for research and development.

In 2003, World Trade Organization (WTO) reached an agreement, which provides a developing country with options for obtaining needed medications under compulsory licensing or importation of cheaper versions of the drugs, even before patent expiration.

In 2007 the government of Brazil declared Merck's efavirenz anti-retroviral drug a "public interest" medicine, and challenged Merck to negotiate lower prices with the government or have Brazil strip the patent by issuing a compulsory license.

It is reported that Ghana, Tanzania, the Democratic Republic of the Congo and Ethiopia have similar plans to produce generic antiviral drugs. Western pharmaceutical companies initially responded with legal challenges, but some have now promised to introduce alternative pricing structures for developing countries and NGOs.

In July 2008 Nobel Prize-winning scientist Sir John Sulston called for an international biomedical treaty to clear up issues over patents.

In response to these criticisms, one review concluded that less than 5 percent of medicines on the World Health Organization's list of essential drugs are under patent. Also, the pharmaceutical industry has contributed US$2 billion for healthcare in developing countries, providing HIV/AIDS drugs at lower cost or even free of charge in certain countries, and has used differential pricing and parallel imports to provide medication to the poor. Other groups are investigating how social inclusion and equitable distribution of research and development findings can be obtained within the existing intellectual property framework, although these efforts have received less exposure.

Quoting a World Health Organization report, Trevor Jones (director of research and development at the Wellcome Foundation, as of 2006) argued in 2006 that patent monopolies do not create monopoly pricing. He argued that the companies given monopolies "set prices largely on the willingness/ability to pay, also taking into account the country, disease and regulation" instead of receiving competition from legalized generics.

== Proposed alternatives to the patent system ==
Alternatives have been discussed to address the issue of financial incentivization to replace patents. Mostly, they are related to some form of direct or indirect government funding. One example is Joseph Stiglitz's idea of providing "prize money" (from a "prize fund" sponsored by the government) as a substitute for the lost profits associated with abstaining from the monopoly given by a patent. Another approach is to remove the issue of financing development from the private sphere altogether, and to cover the costs with direct government funding.

== See also ==
- Anti-copyright
- Free-culture movement
- Glossary of patent law terms
- List of patent-related topics
- Criticism of the United States Patent and Trademark Office
- Notable reexaminations
- Patentleft
- Software patent debate
