= Patent privateer =

A patent privateer or intellectual property privateer is a party, typically a patent assertion entity, authorized by another party, often a technology corporation, to use intellectual property to attack other operating companies. Privateering provides a way for companies to assert intellectual property against their competitors with a significantly reduced risk of retaliation and as a means for altering their competitive landscape. The strategy began with a handful of large operating companies. In April 2013, a group of technology companies asked the U.S. Department of Justice and the Federal Trade Commission to investigate the privateering strategy as an impediment to competition.

Intellectual property privateering most commonly occurs as outsourcing of corporate patent portfolios but can also be applied as one of a corporation's competitive tools and may involve high degrees of stealth. The benefit to the privateer arises in the form of direct financial compensation, either licensing royalties, litigation settlements, or damage awards. The benefits to the sponsors can range from financial gain from licensing to an improved competitive landscape that facilitates increased sales revenue.

Intellectual property privateering has been formally defined as:

the assertion of intellectual property rights by an entity (the privateer), typically in the form of a non-practicing entity (NPE), against a target company for the direct benefit of the privateer and the consequential benefit of a sponsor company, where the consequential benefits are significantly greater than the direct benefits."

The strategy, in part, relies upon the lack of transparency of ownership and motivation permitted in the IP system. The strategy relates to indirect IP strategies in that the IPRs asserted are not owned by the sponsor, although they may have originated from the sponsor's R&D.

== Background ==
Companies have increasingly employed intellectual property rights as competitive tools since the early 1980s, frequently with the goal of extracting value directly from their own IPRs whether from licensing revenue or litigation rewards. As IPR competition has accelerated, companies and investors have tried to grow ever greater returns from IP assets which has incentivized the exploration of new applications of IPRs to fulfill competitive aspirations. Innovations in IPR exploitation have led companies and investors to develop a class of strategic techniques that facilitates the indirect application of IPRs for beneficial effects. IP privateering, one technique among these indirect strategies, concerns the exploitation of third-party IPRs as tools for achieving larger competitive goals.

During the pro-patent era which began in 1980, competitive pressures stimulated increasing interest in IPRs and consequently strategies related to their deployment. The majority of these strategies could be classified as "direct uses" in which a company exclusively focuses on how to maximize the effectiveness of IPRs developed as the result of the company's own R&D activities. Over time, increasing interest in IPRs stimulated the development of IPR markets. The competitive pressures and the varieties of IPRs available in these markets led to the development of various indirect IPR strategies. Companies no longer need to rely exclusively on IPRs developed from their own R&D.

Companies may purchase external, third-party IPRs to fulfill a variety of needs. If a competitor has a product that threatens a company's own products, but the company holds no pertinent IPRs of its own, the company may purchase relevant IPRs in the market for use in an infringement action against the competitor. Similarly, if a company is sued for infringement but holds no pertinent IPRs to use in a countersuit, the company may purchase an appropriate IPR in the market. IP privateering, a still further indirect use of IPRs, concerns the beneficial application of IPRs that a company has not purchased, or in-licensed, but has instead motivated its application against a competitor to achieve some corporate goal.

A corporation or investor acting as the sponsor for an IP privateering engagement employs third-party IPRs as a competitive tool. The privateer, a specialized form of non-practicing entity (NPE), asserts the IPRs against target companies selected by the sponsor. The sponsor's benefits may arise directly from the third party's case against a target but may also arise consequentially from the changed competitive environment brought about by the third party's IPR assertion. As discussed below, the sponsor's benefits may include nudging the target into a less competitive position, facilitating the licensing of a larger collection of the sponsor's own IPRs, and causing a beneficial change to the target's share price and/or corporate valuation. The third-party privateer's motivation comprises collecting a litigation settlement or damages award.

The term patent privateering was coined by IP strategist Tom Ewing and first appeared in publication in a blog post in IAM magazine in August 2010 and was later expanded upon in "Introducing the patent privateers" in the January 2011 issue of IAM magazine and several law journal articles.

== Recent activity ==
Google, Red Hat, Earthlink and BlackBerry have written to the US Federal Trade Commission and Department of Justice asking them to investigate patent privateering, which they say "poses numerous perils to competition, consumers and innovation". BlackBerry is one of the co-owners of Rockstar IP, often considered one of the world's biggest privateers.

== Varieties of IP privateering ==
Corporate IP managers can shape privateering scenarios to fit many competitive scenarios. Privateering may be used by operating companies to change the technology adoption rate between an upstart technology and an incumbent technology, to outsource the licensing of a larger collection of IPRs, and to change some aspect of the legal infrastructure. Privateering may be used by investors to grow existing investments by privateering against competitors in a given technology area, to change the value of the stock price of a public company to temporarily discount its shares and/or to facilitate short selling, to change a company's value during investment, and to recoup investment research and analysis costs.

Outsourcing patent litigation, one branch of privateering, allows companies to shape their competitive environments and in some instances monetize their IP rights at extremely low cost. While industry experts and IP managers concede that privateering exists, the extent to which various privateering scenarios have occurred, are occurring, or will occur in the future, and which privateering scenarios are possible but presently only hypothetical remains somewhat unknown and unknowable because the sponsor's goal in almost every privateering engagement is stealth and because there are few existing reasons under law why the complete ownership structure behind a given patent-holding entity must be publicly exposed. Privateering has possibly resulted in the collection of as much as $3 billion thus far by the known sponsors, and still more in terms of revenues retained and costs avoided, although the total amount received by sponsors remains unclear and possibly incalculable.

IP privateering is not limited to just operating companies; investor groups also likely privateer as well. In many instances, the potential returns and liabilities for these investors compares even more favorably than for the operating companies. Hybrid privateering efforts by operating companies and investors may also occur, especially in instances where the investors are also major stockholders of the operating company that will indirectly benefit from the privateering litigation.

== Legal liability ==
Indirect exploitation of IPRs via intermediaries does not per se give rise to a specific legal cause of action against the sponsor. The sponsor's potential legal liability under current law rarely exceeds that of the third-party privateer who carries out the sponsor's assertion plan. If the privateer avoids liability, so does the sponsor in most instances. Potential sponsor legal liability may give rise to causes of action ranging from tortious interference in business relations to patent misuse, as well as possible market manipulation charges and antitrust problems.

A sponsor's greatest potential liability however rests on adverse business consequences, particularly from public exposure of the sponsor's involvement. A sponsor's goals for a privateering operation are often defeated by public exposure. For example, IP privateering only thwarts the "mutually assured destruction" paradigm of defensive patenting so long as the operating company sponsor's identity remains hidden. Consequently, the sponsor typically makes every effort to hide its involvement in a privateering operation. Privateering can often achieve the sponsor's aims well before a decision on the merits of the case brought by the privateer.

Although privateering might not give rise to legal or equitable cause of action, whether the practice should be encouraged is subject to debate. Privateering raises questions about the social utility of IPRs, particularly patents. Among other things, is "intransparency" in the IPR system a bad thing or are society's objectives in maintaining an IPR system met simply through the enforcement of government-granted rights by any actor, even a hidden one? Privateering also raises questions about the impact, or non-impact, of NPE investment and litigation on the overall economy and investment in research and development. In the absence of information to the contrary, it seems possible that much of the profit from privateering, as well as NPEs, returns to investment rather than being removed from investment.

Privateering also raises questions about the quantity of active and available patents in the so-called pro-patent era and the ease with which they can be acquired and asserted. The impact of privateering on the innovation system and the apparent presence of key innovation system actors in privateering suggests the possible consideration of a more overtly constructed innovation system explicitly designed by all of its major stakeholders, including independent inventors. However, conclusions are difficult to draw with the information presently available and additional investigation seems warranted.

== Legal challenges against privateering ==
Apple filed a breach of contract suit against various companies affiliated with Nokia in December 2016, The complaint alleged that Nokia participated in the ETSI standard-setting process for various cell phone standards, including UMTS/WCMDA (a 3G standard); and LTE (a 4G standard), but later conspired with, and assigned the Nokia patents to, Acacia and other patent-assertion entities ("trolls") in order to avoid the FRAND obligations that Nokia's participation in ETSI standard-setting imposed on Nokia. Apple asserted that this conduct was in violation of Sherman Act §§ 1-2 and Clayton Act § 7, as well as a breach of contract. Apple and Nokia subsequently settled this suit. In 2017, Nokia disclosed that Apple made a $2 billion cash payment to settle the various patent disputes between the companies.

== Relationship to maritime privateering ==
IP privateering resembles an historic method of waging war so effective that it had to be abolished by a treaty, the Paris Declaration Respecting Maritime Law (1856). "Privateering," as it was called, was effective and cheap – the privateer's actions cost the sponsoring government nothing. Privateering, like the creation of corporations, allowed governments to pursue policy objectives without any impact on the treasury. In short, classical privateering removed most obstacles to waging war, save for the opponent's ability to retaliate. IP privateering similarly has the opponent's ability to retaliate as its greatest obstacle, hence the importance of stealth to the sponsor.

Classical privateering was state-sponsored piracy. The government gave the privateer a "letter of marque and reprisal" that allowed him to seize the property of the state's enemies. The privateer could capture ships flying under the enemy's flag, sell the ships and their cargoes at auction and keep the proceeds. Many of the famous English "Sea Dogs," such as Sir Francis Drake, were privateers. To further curtail the use of privateering in warfare, the Hague Convention (1907) clarified the Paris Declaration, by requiring, among other things, that non-military vessels converted into military vessels be under the immediate command of a sovereign government in order for the crew not to be considered pirates.

== See also ==
- Patent troll
