= Patents Court =

The Patents Court is a specialist court within the Chancery Division of the High Court of Justice of England and Wales. It deals with disputes relating to intellectual property, including patents and registered designs. It also hears appeals against decisions of the Comptroller General of Patents. If a case is deemed suitable to be heard at county court level, it can be heard in the Central London County Court.
