= European Patent Office Reports =

The European Patent Office Reports (EPOR) are a series of law reports, including decisions of the Boards of Appeal of the European Patent Office. The reports were published since 1979 and since at least 1989 by Sweet & Maxwell.

== List of editions ==
- European Patent Office, European Patent Office Reports 1986, ESC Pub.
- European Patent Office reports, Sweet & Maxwell, 1989, ISSN 0269-0802, 1989
- Brian C. Reid, Jessica Jones, Rory Sullivan, European Patent Office Reports 1997, Published 1998, Sweet & Maxwell Ltd, ISBN 0-421-61190-1
- Brian C. Reid, Jessica Jones, Rory Sullivan, European Patent Office Reports, 2000, Sweet & Maxwell, ISBN 0-421-69590-0
- Brian C. Reid, Jessica Jones, Rory Sullivan, European Patent Office Reports, 2001, Sweet & Maxwell Ltd, ISBN 0-421-73590-2
- By Brian C. Reid, Jessica Jones, European Patent Office Reports 2001, Published 2002, Sweet & Maxwell Ltd, ISBN 0-421-75480-X
- Peter Mclean Colley, European Patent Office Reports 2005, Published 2005, Sweet & Maxwell Ltd, ISBN 0-421-93480-8
- Peter Mclean Colley, European Patent Office Reports 2006: V. 21, Sweet & Maxwell Ltd, ISBN 1-84703-094-7

== See also ==
- List of intellectual property law journals
- United States Patents Quarterly (USPQ)
