= Scams in intellectual property =

Type of fraud

Scams in intellectual property include scams in which inventors and other rights holders are lured to pay money for an apparently official registration of their intellectual property, or for professional development and promotion of their ideas, but do not receive the expected services.

Intellectual property (IP) is a complex field and covers a vast range of subjects. As a result, there are opportunities for individuals and organizations to take unlawful advantage of those wishing to secure protection for their IP.

== Registration services ==
Registration services are organizations or individuals that contact IP applicants or owners and request payment for an apparently official registration of their IP.

Many applicants for and owners of patents, trademarks and industrial design rights receive letters from such registration services and different IP offices and organizations around the world regularly issue warnings in connection with the offered services.

The registration services target applicants directly because patent, trademark and design applications are published a set time after filing or upon grant along with freely available information about a name and address for the applicant. Registration services use this information to send unlawful requests for payment to applicants shortly after publication. The documents are confusing as they appear to be from official governmental agencies and to be legitimate invoices.

A scam increasing in frequency, as of October 2011, is an email originating from a domain name registrar or IT consulting company based in China that purports to notify a trademark holder that another entity is seeking to register the client's trademark or business name as a domain name in China, Hong Kong, Taiwan, or other Asian countries. The email gives the brand owner a short period in time in which to secure the domain name for their own. These notifications are essentially solicitations. Generally, in the event there really is a third-party who is seeking to register your brand name for nefarious purposes, there are channels available for addressing such uses if and when they materialize.

=== Published warnings for different forms of IP ===
- American Intellectual Property Law Association (AIPLA) - Patent Registry Scams
- Australian Patent Office - Warning! Unsolicited IP Services
- Belgian Patent Office - Warning to inventors about fraudulent registration services, in (in Dutch) or (in French) (with link to a Decision of January 14, 2005 of a Belgian Appeal Court (Brussels, R.G. 2003/AR/2192 and 2003/AR/2356) (pdf) - in French)
- European Community trademarks - Warning
- European Community designs - Warning
- European patent applications - Information from the European Patent Office
- French Patent Office - Warning (in French)
- International Trademark Association (INTA) - Warning: Beware Unsolicited Trademark Services
- International Bureau of the WIPO (international patent applications) - Warning. A "Practical Advice" regarding the "Measures that are being taken by the International Bureau against fraudulent requests for payment of fees, and actions that can be taken by the applicant or agent" was also published in the PCT Newsletter, July-August 2011, No. 07-08/2011, pp. 13–16.
- International trademarks - Warning
- Swiss Patent Office - Warning
- United Kingdom patent applications - Warning: Unsolicited mail about unofficial registration services
- United Kingdom trade marks - Warning: Unsolicited mail about unofficial registration services

=== PCT registration services ===
Registration services are known to target applicants of international patent applications. The World Intellectual Property Organization (WIPO) has issued a warning about several of these services, including:

- IPTO - International Patent & Trademark Organization
- RIPT - Register of International Patents and Trademarks
- IBIP - International Bureau for Intellectual Property
- ODM - Patent Trademark Register
- IBFTPR - International Bureau for Federated Trademark & Patent Register
- IOIP - Organization for Intellectual Property
- ODM - Register of International Patents
- ODM - Office Data Management
- IOPTS - International Organization for Patent & Trademark Service
- FIPTR - Federated Institute for Patent and Trademark Registry Inc. (see "State of Florida v. Federated Institute for Patent and Trademark Registry and Bernd Taubert"
- CPTD - Central Patent & Trademark Database
- CCIT - Commercial Center for Industry and Trade
- CPD - Central Patent Database
- Register of International Patents
- Register of International Patent Bulletin/Registre des données bulletin europeén des brevetes
- Institut of Commerce for Industry, Trade, Commerce/Wirtschaftsinstitut für Industrie, Handel, Handwerk AG
- Central Data-Register of International Patents

== Domain slamming ==
Domain slamming is a form of scam in which an internet service provider (ISP) or domain name registrar attempts to trick customers of different companies into switching from their existing ISP/registrar to the scamming ISP/registrar, under the pretense that the customer is simply renewing their subscription to their old ISP/registrar.

== Invention promotion firm scams ==
An inventor promotion scam or invention promotion scam is a scam where inventors are lured to pay money for development of their invention, or promotion of it, without the development or promotion actually occurring.

Some invention promotion firms have been found to engage in improper and deceptive practices.

Signs of an unscrupulous invention promotion firm include:

- Exaggerated claims about the market potential of the invention
- Refusal to offer advice in writing, or having all correspondence confined to promotional material and scheduling phone calls.
- Request for money immediately and upfront
- Money back guarantees - Reputable professionals charge a fee for service and are compensated for their work and, therefore, do not offer money back guarantees.
