= Federal Patent Court (Switzerland) =

Judicial institution in Switzerland

Coordinates: 47.4216727°N 9.3663733°E

Federal Patent Court of Switzerland
- German: Bundespatentgericht; French: Tribunal fédéral des brevets
- Established: 2012
- Jurisdiction: Switzerland
- Location: Sankt Gallen
- Appeals to: Federal Supreme Court of Switzerland
- Website: https://www.bundespatentgericht.ch/en/

Patent Court Act (PatCA)

Federal Assembly of Switzerland
- Long title: Federal Act on the Federal Patent Court (SR 173.41)
- Territorial extent: Switzerland
- Enacted by: Federal Assembly of Switzerland
- Enacted: 20 March 2009
- Commenced: 1 March 2010
- Status: Current legislation

The Swiss Federal Patent Court (Note: German: Bundespatentgericht; French: Tribunal fédéral des brevets; Italian: Tribunale federale dei brevetti; Romansh: Tribunal federal da patentas) is a Swiss federal court competent for particular legal matters, such as patent cases. It has its seat in Sankt Gallen, Switzerland.

In Switzerland, the court has exclusive jurisdiction with regard to the Swiss/Liechtenstein unitary patents, whether these unitary patents are European patents or "national" patents, in questions of validity and infringement disputes, preliminary measures and enforcement of decisions made under its exclusive jurisdiction.

Appeal is possible (with regard to legal issues) to the Federal Supreme Court. The court started its work in 2012, taking over jurisdiction from 26 individual cantonal courts and consists of panels of both legally and technically qualified judges.

The Patent Court was established and is governed by the Patent Court Act (PatCA), (Note: German: Patentgerichtsgesetz, PatGG; French: Loi sur le Tribunal fédéral des brevets, LTFB; Italian: Legge sul Tribunale federale dei brevetti, LTFB) adopted by the Federal Assembly in 2009.

== See also ==
- Federal Patent Court of Germany
- Swiss Federal Institute of Intellectual Property
- Copyright law of Switzerland
