= Federal Patent Court (Germany) =

German federal court

Coordinates: 48°05′30″N 11°36′05″E

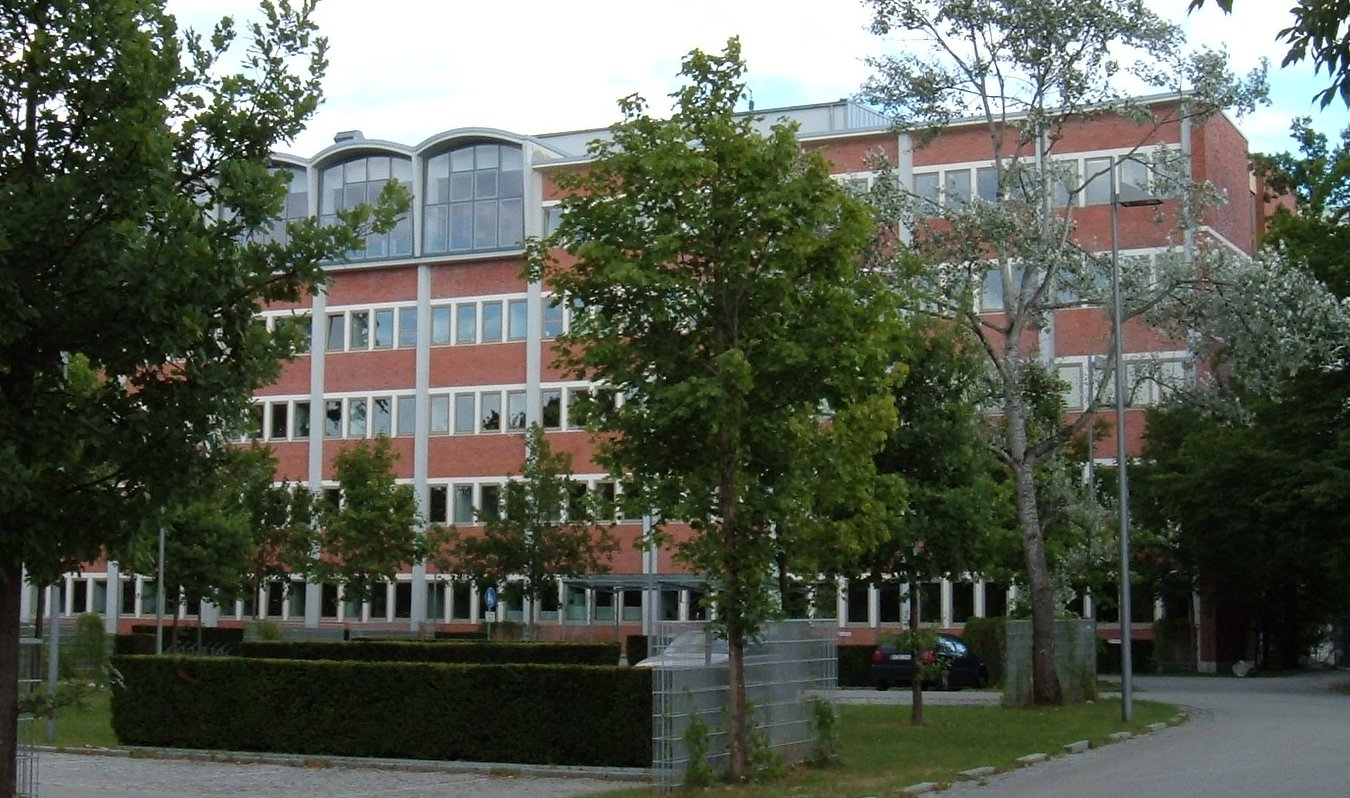
The German Federal Patent Court (BPatG)

The Federal Patent Court (German: Bundespatentgericht, pronounced [bʊndəspaˈtɛntɡəʁɪçt]; abbreviation: BPatG) is a German federal court competent for particular legal matters, such as patent and trademark cases. It has its seat in Munich, Germany, and was established on July 1, 1961. Within Germany's dual system, in which patent infringement proceedings and nullity suits are dealt with before different courts, the Federal Patent Court is in charge of nullity suits, i.e. deciding upon challenges to the validity of German and European patents having effect in Germany.

== See also ==
- Deutsches Patent- und Markenamt (DPMA)
- Federal Patent Court (Switzerland)
- German patent law
