= Patent holding company =

Type of business that collects patents

A patent holding company (PHC) exists to hold patents on behalf of one or more other companies but does not necessarily manufacture products or supply services based upon the patents held.

Patent holding companies may exist for tax reasons. Patent holding companies may also operate patent pools in order to provide a single source for licensing a patented technology. However, patent holding companies that aggressively seek to enforce patent rights through litigation or threats of litigation are referred to as patent assertion entities (PAEs) or, more pejoratively, patent trolls.

== Patent trolling ==
On June 4, 2013, in the United States, the National Economic Council and Council of Economic Advisers released a report entitled Patent Assertion and U.S. Innovation that found significant harm to the economy from patent assertion entities and made recommendations to address them. President Barack Obama also addressed the issue, criticizing companies that did not produce anything themselves and existed only to "leverage and hijack somebody else's idea and see if they can extort some money out of them".

== See also ==
- Patent portfolio
- Patent thicket
