= Patent law of China =

People's Republic of China patent law

Patent law in modern mainland China began with the promulgation of the Patent Law of the People's Republic of China, in 1984. This law was modeled after patent systems of other civil law countries, particularly Germany and Japan.

== Background ==
The PRC's early regulations provided for inventors' patent rights, but these were abolished fairly quickly under the view that patent rights were incompatible with socialism. China then followed the model of the Soviet Union's inventor certificates, honorary titles that were granted to inventors without remuneration.

Just prior to the Cultural Revolution, China completely abolished its patent regulations.

In 1985, China acceded to the Paris Convention for the Protection of Industrial Property, followed by the Patent Cooperation Treaty in 1994. When China joined the World Trade Organization (WTO) in 2001, it became a member of the TRIPS agreement.

To comply with its international obligations, as well as to facilitate its development into an innovative country, China has since amended its Patent Law three times: first in 1992, then again in 2000, and most recently in 2009.

Pharmaceuticals and chemicals were not patentable under the 1984 Patent Law, but became patentable after the law was amended in 1992. A bilateral memorandum of understanding with the United States made this amendment to domestic law necessary. China accepted this requirement because it would have ultimately been necessary in order for China to re-enter the General Agreement on Tariffs and Trade.

The 2000 amendments to the Patent Law were designed to ensure China's compliance with its obligations under the TRIPS Agreement.

== Types of patent protection ==
Patents in China are granted by the China National Intellectual Property Administration (CNIPA), which was renamed in English on 28 August 2018 from State Intellectual Property Office (SIPO). There are three types of patents: invention patents, utility model patents, and design patents. Invention patents are substantively examined, while utility model patents are subject only to a formal examination. Patent examination is done by the State Intellectual Property Office (SIPO), which had over 14,000 patent examiners in 2019 and an average patent pendency time of 16.5 months, which is ca. 65% of the median pendency time at the USPTO. In 2012 invention patents, utility models and design patents had life terms of 20 years, 10 years and 10 years, respectively. Maintenance of issued patents in China requires payment of annual fees.

== Patent interpretation ==
Patents are construed both literally and according to the doctrine of equivalents. In China, an equivalent is an element of an article which is "insubstantially different from" an integer of the patent's claim: a technical feature which can be conceived easily by the patent's addressee that performs substantially the same function as the claim's integer, in substantially the same way, achieving substantially the same result. The "all elements" rule applies, such that for an article to be an infringement it must contain features identical or equivalent to all elements of the patent claim.

== Patent validity ==
Any person can contest a patent's validity. There is a post-grant opposition procedure available through SIPO, and actions may also be initiated at the Patent Review Board (PRB). Appeals may be made to the Beijing IP Court. Before 2014, appeals were made to the Beijing Intermediate People's Court.

Patent litigation proceedings are bifurcated, meaning that issues of infringement are tried separately (and in a separate venue) from invalidity. Normally infringement proceedings will be stayed (on application by the defendant) pending outcome of the invalidity hearing.

In April 2017, SIPO revised its patent examination guidelines to also allow the patenting of business methods provided the claimed method had technical features.

== Other key provisions ==
In cases of joint patentees, the default rule in China is that each patentee can grant nonexclusive license without the other joint patentees' consent. Joint patentees can avoid application of this default rule by agreement, however.

As compared to the United States, China has more non-patentable matters.

== Patent subsidies and quality of patents ==
Since the 1980s, The Central government of PR China adopted several programs aimed at stimulating "indigenous innovation" in several technological fields, including biotechnology, space, information technology, new materials, etc. As a part of these efforts, the city of Shanghai introduced in 1999 a patent subsidy program for local businesses. By 2003 similar programs have been adopted by almost every province in PR China. Such programs quickly resulted in PR China becoming world largest patent filer in terms of patent families filed and patents issued: in 2020 China accounted for 46% all patent applications in the World.

However, the subsidy policy resulted in a flood of low-quality patents and, especially, of low-quality utility models. In order to improve the quality of the Chinese patent system, the PRC government cancelled subsidies for the patent application stage by June 30, 2021. This means local governments are no longer permitted to offer financial support, rewards, or subsidies for the costs associated with applying for a patent. Subsidies for granted patents were eliminated entirely by the end of 2025.

== See also ==
- Intellectual property in China
- Law in the People's Republic of China
- Chinese law
