= Software patents under Canadian patent law =

Neither computers nor software are specifically mentioned in the Canadian Patent Act. Canadian courts have held that the use of a computer in an invention neither lends, nor reduces patentability. Therefore, that an invention involves a computer is not determinative of patentability; instead, whether a computer-using invention is patentable turns on whether that invention meets the general requirements for patentability as would apply to any invention.

== Law ==
=== Substantive law ===
Computers, software, or related terms do not appear anywhere in the Patent Act. Therefore, as with any other invention, to be patentable a computer-using invention must meet the general requirements for patentability of any invention as found in the Act.

"Invention" is defined in Section 2 of the Patent Act as:

"[A]ny new and useful art, process, machine, manufacture or composition of matter, or any new and useful improvement in any art, process, machine, manufacture or composition of matter".

So, any invention must be new and useful. Inventions must also be non-obvious as provided in section 28.3. Inventions must also fall into one of the five categories of patentable subject matter found in the definition of "invention" above.

The Patent Act has an additional prohibition in section 27(8) that "No patent shall be granted for any mere scientific principle or abstract theorem." This requirement, though it does not relate directly to software, has been found by the courts to limit the patentability of some computer-using inventions.

The above patentability requirements are general and apply to any invention. The case law and patent office practice determine how these general requirements are applied to patent applications for computer-using inventions.

=== Case law ===
==== Schlumberger Canada Ltd. v. Canada (Commissioner of Patents) ====
In 1981, the Federal Court of Appeal considered the question of the patentability of an invention that involved software in the case of Schlumberger. In Schlumberger, the applicant sought to patent a process for analysis of measurements from boreholes for oil and gas exploration. The application described a process where the measurements were processed by a computer for mathematical analysis and display to a human operator.

The court held, in the most often quoted passage of the decision, that the calculations involved in the present invention would, if done by a man, be "mathematical formulae and a series of purely mental operations". The court also found that a mathematical formula fell within the prohibition in the Patent Act against patents for scientific principles or abstract theorems. The court went on to find that "the fact that a computer is ... used to implement a discovery does not change the nature of that discovery." Therefore, the application was rejected as unpatentable for not falling within the definition of "invention" found in the Patent Act.

The holding in Schlumberger is that the use of a computer neither adds to, nor subtracts from, the patentability of an alleged invention.

==== Amazon.com Inc. v. Canada (Commissioner of Patents) ====
In 2011, the Federal Court of Appeal again considered the question of the patentability of an invention that used software in the case of Amazon.com. In Amazon.com, the applicant sought a patent for a "one-click" method of online purchasing which allowed a user to make online purchases without the requirement of re-entering billing and shipping information. The patent had been rejected by the Commissioner of Patents as non-patentable subject matter.

In the Federal Court, the Patent Office's reasons for rejecting the patent, and in particular the finding that the subject of the claims was non-patentable subject matter, were found improper and the patent was directed back to the Commissioner for re-examination with the direction that the claims constitute patentable subject matter.

The Commissioner appealed the decision to the Federal Court of Appeal. The Federal Court found that the "determination of subject matter must be based on a purposive construction of the patent claims." In doing so, Sharlow J.A., substantially agreed with the reasons below. However, the court vacated the lower courts finding that the claims constituted patentable subject matter, finding instead that the trial judge did not have the benefit of expert evidence necessary to provide a "foundation of knowledge about the relevant art" to support claims construction. The court then ordered the Commissioner to re-examine the patent application on an expedited basis including construction of the claims.

In considering the case, the Court of Appeals addressed the earlier case of Schlumberger, and remarked that:

"It is arguable that the patent claims in issue in this case could fail on the same reasoning, depending upon whether a purposive construction of the claims in issue leads to the conclusion that Schlumberger cannot be distinguished because the only inventive aspect of the claimed invention is the algorithm – a mathematical formula – that is programmed into the computer to cause it to take the necessary steps to accomplish a one-click online purchase. On the other hand, it is also arguable that a purposive construction of the claims may lead to the conclusion that Schlumberger is distinguishable because a new one-click method of completing an online purchase is not the whole invention but only one of a number of essential elements in a novel combination. In my view, the task of purposive construction of the claims in this case should be undertaken anew by the Commissioner, with a mind open to the possibility that a novel business method may be an essential element of a valid patent claim."

After re-examination, the Amazon.com patent was issued by the Commissioner.

== Canadian Patent Office practice ==
On March 8, 2013, the Canadian Patent Office announced changes in patent examination practice based on the ruling in the Amazon.com case.

The Patent Office published new guidelines for the determination of statutory subject matter based on a purposive construction of claims as guided in Amazon.com. Concurrently, updated guidance on examination practice for computer-related inventions was also released.

=== Examination practice respecting purposive construction ===
On March 8, 2013, the Patent Office released a practice notice guiding examiners that, according to Amazon.com, the "identification of the actual invention" is "required to be grounded in a purposive construction of the patent claims". The notice lays out a set of guidelines for claim construction in examination, relying on the Supreme Court decisions in the related cases of Free World Trust and Whirlpool.

=== Computer-implemented inventions examination practice ===
On March 8, 2013, the Patent Office released a practice notice revising policy on examination of "computer-implemented inventions". The practice notice overrides previous sections of the Manual of Patent Office Practice (MOPOP) relating to "computer-implemented" inventions, including sections related to "examining computer claims." The practice notice instead guides that the "evaluation of the subject-matter of a claim for compliance with section 2 of the Patent Act is to be made on the basis of the essential elements as determined through a purposive construction."

Notably, the practice notice states that "where a computer is found to be an essential element of a construed claim, the claimed subject-matter will generally be statutory."

== See also ==
- Software patent
- Subject matter in Canadian patent law
