= Amazon.com Inc v Canada (Commissioner of Patents) =

Decision of the Canadian Federal Court of Appeal

- Court: Federal Court of Appeal
- Decided: November 24, 2011
- Citation: 2011 FCA 328

Case history
- Prior actions: Amazon.com Inc. v. Canada (Commissioner of Patents), 2010 FC 1011

Court membership
- Judges sitting: Sharlow J.A., Trudel J.A., Stratas J.A.

Keywords
- Patent, Software, Computer, Business Methods

Amazon.com Inc v Canada (Commissioner of Patents) is a decision of the Federal Court of Appeal concerning the patentability of business methods within the context of the Patent Act. At issue was the patentability of a method that allowed customers shopping online to make purchases with one-click buying.

== Background ==
In 1998, Amazon.com filed a patent application for a "Method and System For Placing A Purchase Order Via A Communication Network". This invention allowed customers shopping online to make purchases with one-click buying, which circumvents the process of entering address and billing information in the traditional shopping cart mode of online shopping. The patent application was rejected by the Commissioner of Patents as non-statutory subject matter. Following litigation, the Commissioner of Patents issued the patent in December 2011.

== Judicial History ==
=== Commissioner of Patents ===
In 2009, the Commissioner of Patents made several findings in its rejection of Amazon.com's patent application. First, it noted that both the form and substance of the claim must be evaluated. Form refers to the text of the claim and understanding the claim based on the text alone. Substance connotes the nature of the invention in question and what it adds to human knowledge. The Commissioner noted that the substance of the invention, defined by its new and inventive features, must fall within one of the statutory categories of invention found within section 2 of the Patent Act.

Applying this approach to the facts, the Commissioner found that, although Amazon.com's claim, on the fact of its text, was directed towards a "machine", a patentable subject matter, the Commissioner found that the substance of all its claims were directed to streamlining the process of sales and reaping benefits flowing from it, and therefore constituted a "business method". In Monsanto Canada Inc v Schmeiser, Justice Arbour, in dissent, had listed a number of examples where courts had excluded subject matter from patentability, including (incorrectly) "business systems and methods". The Commissioner relied on Justice Arbour's observation to find that business methods had no historical basis of patentability in Canada, and were therefore per se unpatentable. No definition of "business method" was supplied by the Commissioner.

In considering whether business methods could fall under the statutory category of an "art", the Commissioner found that all five statutory categories of invention were technological in nature. It concluded that an "art" that is not technological cannot be a statutory subject matter. The Commissioner dismissed that the Amazon.com's invention provided any technological benefits and advances because Amazon.com's decision to proceed with one-click shopping with business in nature and yielded only a "convenience advantage".

Amazon.com proceed to commence an appeal of the Commissioner's decision at the Federal Court of Canada in 2010.

=== Federal Court of Canada ===
At the Federal Court, Justice Phelan decisively quashed the Commissioner's decision. First, the Court found that the "form and substance" formulation and analysis of Amazon.com's claims departed from the approach articulated by the Supreme Court of Canada in Free World Trust v Électro Santé Inc and Whirlpool Corp v Camco Inc, which stated that the identification of the invention must be done through a purposive construction of its claims. Second, the Court found that the "technological" requirement was too restrictive in the test for an "art". The Court could find nothing in Canadian jurisprudence which would support such a requirement. Third, Justice Phelan concluded that there was no "tradition" for the categorical exclusion of "business methods" from patentability in Canada. Instead, the Court states that business methods were to be assessed pursuant to the five categories found within section 2 of the Patent Act.

The Court then went on to consider the claims and find that a purposive construction of Amazon.com's claims disclosed a "machine", a patentable subject matter under section 2 of the Patent Act, which implemented something more than just a "mathematical formula". Given this characterization of Amazon.com's claims and its rejection of the Commissioner's decision, the Court sent the case back to the Commissioner with the direction that the claims constitute patentable subject matter.

The Commissioner of Patents then appealed the decision to the Federal Court of Appeal, which released its decision in late 2011.

== Ruling ==
The Federal Court of Appeal essentially agreed with the three criticisms the Federal Court offered for the Commissioner's decision. The Court, however, also added that "it does not necessarily follow…that a business method that is not itself patentable subject matter because it is an abstract idea becomes patentable subject matter merely because it has a practical embodiment or a practical application. In my view, this cannot be a distinguishing test, because it is axiomatic that a business method always has or is intended to have a practical application." Thus, the Court of Appeal did not affirm Justice Phelan's finding that Amazon.com's claims constituted patentable subject matter. Instead, it noted that Amazon.com's claim may still fail if, per Schlumberger Canada Ltd v Canada (Commissioner of Patents), the only novel aspect of the claimed invention was the business method and the business method was interpreted as a "mere scientific principle or abstract theorem", which cannot be the subject matter of an invention according to section 27(8) of the Patent Act, mentioned above.

Despite agreeing with most of the substance of the Federal Court's judgement, Justice Sharlow, writing for the Federal Court of Appeal, found that it was inappropriate for Justice Phelan to pursue his own purposive construction of the claims advanced by Amazon.com. Purposive construction must be executed with a foundation of knowledge about the relevant art. Justice Phelan did not have expert evidence before the Federal Court from persons skilled in the art, and therefore it would have been more appropriate for the Commissioner to re-examine the claims, given the expertise of the Patent Office. Accordingly, the Federal Court of Appeal remanded the application to the Commissioner for expedited reconsideration.

== Aftermath ==
The Commissioner of Patents issued the patent in December 2011.

Later, on March 8, 2012, the Canadian Patent Office announced changes in patent examination practice based on the ruling in the Amazon.com case. CIPO published new guidelines for determining whether an invention constitutes statutory subject matter based on a purposive construction of the claims. Updated guidance on examination practice for computer-related inventions was also published at the same time.

== See also ==
- Subject matter in Canadian patent law
- Software patents under Canadian patent law
