= Defences and remedies in Canadian patent law =

A patent holder in Canada has the exclusive right, privilege and liberty to making, constructing, using and selling the invention for the term of the patent, from the time the patent is granted. Any person who does any of these acts in relation to an invention without permission of the patent owner is liable for patent infringement.

When faced with an action for patent infringement, the defendant has a number of defences that they can use. These roughly fall into three categories:

1. Non-infringement, asserting that the defendant does not make, use or sell the patented invention;
2. Invalidity, asserting that the patent should not have been granted in view of prior art;
3. Defences based on user rights, statutory or otherwise.

Remedies in Canadian patent law generally track both common law and equitable remedies. Equitable remedies include injunctions (both final and interlocutory) and an accounting of profits. Common law remedies include damages aimed at putting the plaintiff in the position he would have occupied had the infringement not occurred.

== Invalidity defences ==
In order to obtain a patent, an invention must be:

- Allowable subject matter;
- New;
- Useful;
- Not obvious to a person skilled in the art.

The Canadian Patent Act allows that:

59. The defendant, in any action for infringement of a patent may plead as matter of defence any fact or default which by this Act or by law renders the patent void, and the court shall take cognizance of that pleading and of the relevant facts and decide accordingly.

Therefore, if a person can show that a patent claims improper subject matter, is anticipated, inoperable or obvious, then the patent can be declared void. For example, if a defendant can show evidence that the claimed invention was known as of the claim date, and thus the invention is not new, the patent can be declared void.

=== Improper subject matter ===
Under section 2 of the Patent Act, an invention is defined as:

any new and useful art, process, machine, manufacture or composition of matter, or any new and useful improvement in any art, process, machine, manufacture or composition of matter

If the defendant can successfully show that the invention does not fall into any of these classes, then the patent will be invalid. There are a few cases where this has occurred, such as Harvard College v. Canada (Commissioner of Patents). In that case, it was held that while the genetically engineered plasmid and transgenic mouse cells were the proper subject of a patent, the genetically modified mouse and other higher life forms were not.

=== Lack of utility or inoperability ===
In applying for a patent, the applicant must show that the patent is operable as of the claim date. The claim itself must specify the invention in enough detail that a person skilled in the art would be able to reproduce the invention. In lieu of an operable invention, the applicant must show that there is a sound factual basis for the invention and explain why the invention should work.

This defence was successfully used in Minerals Separation North American Corp. v. Noranda Mines Ltd., where a mining company sued another for the use of a patented process using a xanthate frothing flotation method in order to separate minerals from ore. It failed because the patent claims included all xanthates, but it was known that not all xanthates could be used in the process. Consequently, the patent was held invalid as a person skilled in the art could not use the patent specifications in order to reproduce the effect and the patent was inoperable. However, in Burton Parsons Chemicals, Inc. v. Hewlett-Packard (Canada) Ltd., the same defence was not successful because a person skilled in the art would know which of the unspecified material could and could not be used.

=== Anticipation ===
An anticipation defence attempts to show that the invention was not new as of the claim date. The current test used in Canadian Patent law was enunciated in Apotex Inc. v. Sanofi‑Synthelabo Canada Inc. The test includes two prongs: prior disclosure and enablement.

The prior disclosure requirement asks whether a person skilled in the art would know that the previous disclosure covered the same material as the patent at issue. There is no trial and error permitted at this stage of the inquiry - either doing what is specified in the earlier disclosure or patent would infringe the patent at issue, or it will not.

The enablement requirement asks whether a person skilled in the art would be able to work the invention as disclosed in the prior art. Some experimentation is allowed at this stage of the inquiry, but the experimentation must not pose an undue burden. Long and arduous experimentation, for example, would indicate that the prior disclosure did not include enough information for a defence of anticipation to succeed.

The earlier case Reeves Brothers Inc. v. Toronto Quilting & Embroidery Ltd. holds that the prior disclosure must include all requisite factors in a single document without making a mosaic. In Canadian patent law, there is a high bar for a test of anticipation to succeed.

=== Obviousness ===
An obviousness defence attempts to show that the invention is an obvious or logical next step of a previously disclosed invention. In order for the defence to succeed, it must be shown that a person skilled in the art would be able to take this particular step in innovation. Beloit Canada Ltd. et al. v. Valmet Oy defines the person skilled in the art as a:

"technician skilled in the art but having no scintilla of inventiveness or imagination; a paragon of deduction and dexterity, wholly devoid of intuition; a triumph of the left hemisphere over the right. The question to be asked is whether this mythical creature [...] would, in the light of the state of the art and of common general knowledge as at the claimed date of invention, have come directly and without difficulty to the solution taught by the patent".

The current approach used in Canadian patent law was enunciated by the Supreme Court of Canada in Apotex Inc. v. Sanofi‑Synthelabo Canada Inc. In coming to its decision, a court must consider:

1. The notional person skilled in the art and that person's relevant common knowledge;
2. The inventive concept of the claim must be determined and construed;
3. Any differences that exist between the art prior to the claim and the inventive concept of the claim;
4. Whether these differences constitute steps which would be obvious to the person skilled in the art, without knowledge of the invention.

In some fields, experimentation is common and some experiments are considered to be "obvious-to-try". Apotex Inc. v. Sanofi‑Synthelabo Canada Inc. outlines major considerations in fields where this occurs: whether it is self-evident that what is being tried should work, the extent of the effort required to achieve the invention, and motive in the prior art to find a solution to the problem. In some cases, this could lead to a finding that the additional step taken was obvious and therefore the patent for the additional innovation will be considered void.

== Non-infringement defences ==
A defendant in a patent infringement case can also argue that while the plaintiff's patent is valid, they have not infringed the patent. Under section 42 of the Canadian Patent Act, a patent holder has the exclusive right, liberty and privilege to make, construct, sell and use the invention for the duration of the patent. A defence based on these terms would typically focuses on use, which has been given special attention due to the difficulty of interpreting the term "use".

Use has been defined in Monsanto Canada Inc. v. Schmeiser as any activity that deprives an inventor, in whole or in part, directly or indirectly, of full enjoyment of the monopoly as conferred by law. Monsanto Canada Inc. v. Schmeiser sets a very high bar for a defence based on these terms, as possession of the invention leads to an rebuttable presumption of use. The presumption can be rebutted if the defendant can show that they genuinely did not intend on using the patented invention. For example, in British United Shoe Ministry v. Simon Collier Ltd., the patented invention was a part of a machine which the defendant bootmaker had removed and set aside. It was possible to run the machine without using the patented part, and the defendants willingly returned the patented invention when action was commenced.

If the patented invention occurred as an intermediary of a process or the patented process occurred outside of Canada, patent infringement may still be found. A court should consider the following factors in determining whether there has been infringement in these cases:

1. The importance of the process or intermediary to the final product sold in Canada;
2. Whether the final product contains all or part of the patented product;
3. The stage at which the patented product or process is used;
4. The number of instances of use made of the patented process or object;
5. The strength of the evidence indicating that if the process or intermediary had occurred in Canada, the product or process would constitute infringement.

In a case of secondary infringement or inducement, the plaintiff patent holder would need to show:

1. Primary infringement from the direct infringer;
2. Influence from the seller to engage in infringement, to the point where without the influence there would have been no infringement;
3. The influence was knowingly exercised by the seller.

A successful defence could be based on any of these grounds in the case of secondary infringement or inducement.

== Gillette defence ==
The Gillette defence is a way of arguing non-infringement by proving invalidity without requiring the patent claims to be construed. The defence is based on an early 1900s decision from the House of Lords and allows the defendant to plead that their alleged infringing actions are part of the prior art, and thus either the patent is invalid for claiming the prior art or if the patent is valid, the defendant does not infringe. In view of the Supreme Court's decision in Free World Trust, any Gillette Defence would still require that the patent claims are construed prior to determining infringement.

== User rights ==
International treaties such as NAFTA and TRIPs allow member states to create exceptions from the exclusive rights enjoyed by patent owners where the exceptions:

1. do not unreasonably conflict with the normal exploitation of a patent;
2. do not unreasonably prejudice the legitimate interests of the patent owner;
3. and take into consideration the legitimate interests of other parties.

Under the Canadian Patent Act, legitimate user rights include prior use, experiments and research, and private non-commercial uses. Further user rights are available under the common law doctrine of exhaustion. Academics submit that user rights may extend to education.

=== Prior uses ===
Section 56(1) of the Canadian Patent Act covers the situation where a person has made or used an invention prior to a patent claim by another person.

56. (1) Every person who, before the claim date of a claim in a patent has purchased, constructed or acquired the subject matter defined by the claim, has the right to use and sell to others the specific article, machine, manufacture or composition of matter patented and so purchased, constructed or acquired without being liable to the patentee or the legal representatives of the patentee for so doing.

This would usually occur where the first person did not patent the invention or process and attempted to keep it a trade secret. Canadian patent law protects these good faith acquirers and independent inventors to a certain extent; if the patented invention is an object, then the good faith user can keep using it or sell that particular object without liability.

Moreover, where a patent covers an apparatus and a method of using it, the acquisition of the apparatus before the relevant date entitles the owner to continue to practise the method with that apparatus after the patent is issued. However, it is uncertain at present whether section 56 would apply to a patented method or process per se used prior to the relevant date.

If the patented invention is a machine or process, then the good faith user may keep selling its output. However, the law after NAFTA favours patent applicants over prior good faith users, and the user may not expand his use by making and selling more of the patented product, build another machine to increase his output, or expand his or her process.

In Britain, prior use rights are more extensive. A good faith user's right begins when he has made serious preparations to do the act that would lead to patent infringement, and he may begin or continue to do the act regardless of the grant of patent. If the good faith user's act or preparations to do the act were done in the course of business, then the right may also be exercised by his business partners and transferred if the business is dissolved or sold.

=== Experiments and research ===
In section 32 of the Patent Act, a person is permitted to patent improvements on an existing patent.

32. Any person who has invented any improvement on any patented invention may obtain a patent for the improvement, but he does not thereby obtain the right of making, vending or using the original invention, nor does the patent for the original invention confer the right of making, vending or using the patented improvement.

Consequently, other jurisdictions such as the United Kingdom and New Zealand have held that a researcher may ignore a patent when conducting experiments. Fair research and experimentation is considered to end when the product or process is ready for commercial exploitation. Essentially, a researcher may patent the improvement of an existing patent, but cannot exploit it without the permission of the earlier patent holder until the earlier patent expires.

In the United States, this exception is construed very narrowly. A person may pursue research on an existing patent only for "amusement, satisfy[ing] idle curiosity, or for strictly philosophical inquiry."

=== Private non-commercial uses ===
It is not an infringement of patent law to make the models or patented objects for private or non commercial use.

55.2 (1) It is not an infringement of a patent for any person to make, construct, use or sell the patented invention solely for uses reasonably related to the development and submission of information required under any law of Canada, a province or a country other than Canada that regulates the manufacture, construction, use or sale of any product.

[...]

(6) For greater certainty, subsection (1) does not affect any exception to the exclusive property or privilege granted by a patent that exists at law in respect of acts done privately and on a non-commercial scale or for a non-commercial purpose or in respect of any use, manufacture, construction or sale of the patented invention solely for the purpose of experiments that relate to the subject-matter of the patent.

The French equivalent is somewhat clearer on this exception.

This exception allows users to make patented products for private use, but the exception stops short of any commercial use.

=== Doctrine of exhaustion ===
In Canada, the common law doctrine of exhaustion provides that a purchaser of a patented product benefits from an implied licence to use, repair, and resell that product. The doctrine applies only in the absence of any restriction imposed by the patentee or licensee. Although the doctrine applies to repairs, it does not apply to remanufacturers.

=== Education ===
While there is no provision in the Patent Act allowing use of a patent for the purposes of education, Vaver in his treatise Intellectual Property Law: Copyright, Trademark and Patent has argued that the courts may accept an exception for educational purposes. Such an exception would be consistent with other acts such as the Integrated Circuit Topography Act, which includes provisions protecting users who make or copy a topography for the purposes of education, and the proposed amendments to Canadian copyright law which add education to the enumerated purposes for the fair dealing exception.

== Remedies for patent infringement ==
Remedies for patent infringement track both common law and equitable remedies. Usual remedies in patent law include injunctions, damages and an accounting of profits.

=== Injunctions ===
A plaintiff in a patent infringement case can ask for an injunction prohibiting the defendant from committing the infringing acts in the future. An injunction is a discretionary remedy, and the court may decide, depending on the circumstances of the case, to delay giving an injunction for the defendant to close down his infringing operations or to refuse giving an injunction at all. In some cases, an injunction would prevent worthy innovators from entering the market.

The Canadian Patent Act specifies:

57. (1) In any action for infringement of a patent, the court, or any judge thereof, may, on the application of the plaintiff or defendant, make such order as the court or judge sees fit,

(a) restraining or enjoining the opposite party from further use, manufacture or sale of the subject-matter of the patent, and for his punishment in the event of disobedience of that order, or

(b) for and respecting inspection or account,

and generally, respecting the proceedings in the action.

In Canadian patent law, the courts favour refusing an injunction for infringement, particularly where the patent holder would be fairly compensated through a monetary compensation award. Courts in the United States have been critical of "patent trolls", who purchase unexploited patents for the purposes of imposing licensing fees onto a trade, stating that awarding an injunction would hand over "a club to be wielded by a patentee to enhance his negotiating stance".

Interlocutory injunctions, which prevent the defendant from engaging in the allegedly infringing activity during the court proceedings, used to be de rigueur in intellectual property cases. However, they have more recently become rare, particularly as they are very rarely granted. In order to show that in interlocutory injunction is justified, a plaintiff must show:

1. a serious question to be tried;
2. injury that cannot be adequately compensated in monetary damages if the injunction is not granted ("irreparable harm");
3. a balance of convenience favours granting an interlocutory injunction

In the case of patent law, an interlocutory injunction would seriously inhibit the ability of an alleged infringer from developing a new invention, even if their activity did not infringe the original patent's claims.

=== Damages ===
Damages in patent law track those of the law of tort. The claimant should receive compensation that would restore it to the position it would have occupied should the patent infringement have never occurred. Some of the measures used to in considering a fair compensation for infringement include lost sales, a reasonable royalty, intangible losses, proportioning damages compared to what was infringed, whether the patent was infringed knowingly, and punitive damages.

=== Accounting of profits ===
Canadian patent law also provides an accounting of profits made by the defendant infringer as a remedy. An accounting of profits is an equitable remedy entirely based on the idea that the defendant did not have the right to benefit from the property of the plaintiff patent holder. While considerations such as intent may have a role in damage awards, they do not in an accounting of profits.

Profits are calculated using a direct cost accounting method. The infringer is liable for the net profits realized as a result of the infringement, having deducted the variable expenses associated with making the infringing product. Only an increase in fixed expenses as a result of the infringing product can be deducted from the profits.

=== Special cases in patent law ===
If a patent is granted, the patent holder may sue for any patent infringement that occurred between the publication of the specifications of the invention and the grant of the patent. Section 55(2) of the Patent Act states:

55(2) A person is liable to pay reasonable compensation to a patentee and to all persons claiming under the patentee for any damage sustained by the patentee or by any of those persons by reason of any act on the part of that person, after the application for the patent became open to public inspection under section 10 and before the grant of the patent, that would have constituted an infringement of the patent if the patent had been granted on the day the application became open to public inspection under that section.

Note that the remedies that a patent holder can receive are of a lower standard than for a post-grant patent infringement. While s 55(2) asks for "reasonable compensation", s 55(1) asks for "all damage sustained" by the patentee. What compensation is considered reasonable will depend on the facts of the case.
