= Patent infringement in Canadian law =

Once an invention is patented in Canada, exclusive rights are granted to the patent holder as defined by s.42 of the Patent Act (R.S.C., 1985, c. P-4). Any interference with the patent holder's "full enjoyment of the monopoly granted by the patent" is considered a patent infringement. Making, constructing, using, or selling a patented invention without the patent holder's permission can constitute infringement. Possession of a patented object, use of a patented object in a process, and inducement or procurement of an infringement may also, in some cases, count as infringement.

== Canadian Statute ==
In Canada, patents are governed by the Patent Act. Section 42 of the Patent Act establishes the rights of a patent holder:

42. Every patent granted under this Act shall contain the title or name of the invention, with a reference to the specification, and shall, subject to this Act, grant to the patentee and the patentee’s legal representatives for the term of the patent, from the granting of the patent, the exclusive right, privilege and liberty of making, constructing and using the invention and selling it to others to be used, subject to adjudication in respect thereof before any court of competent jurisdiction.

By granting the patent holder the exclusive right, privilege and liberty of making, constructing, using, and selling the invention, the patent act establishes that any other person making, constructing, using, or selling the patented invention is infringing that patent. Whether there has been an infringement of a patent is usually a question of fact.

The Patent Act is a federal statute and thus bilingual. Under the Constitution Act, 1982, both the English and French versions of the statute hold equal status before the courts. The terms "making, constructing, using, and selling" should be read in the context of their French counterparts, "fabriquer, construire, exploiter et vendre". This has affected the interpretation of the term "use" in cases involving patent infringement.

== Making, constructing, and selling ==
Before an infringement can be established, it is necessary to construct the claims to determine what elements of the invention are essential and which are non-essential. Once the essential elements are established, making, constructing or selling something that copies the essential elements will be considered infringing.

=== Purposive construction of claims ===
Canadian patents should be given a purposive construction. The words used by the inventor are read in a manner consistent with what it is presumed the inventor intended; the interpretation should be sympathetic to the express or implicit purpose of the patent. The inventor's intent must be based on the patent, the court is not allowed to use extrinsic evidence of the inventor's intent. Courts should not take a purely literal interpretation of the patent, courts should determine whether a Person Skilled in the Art would conclude that strict adherence was essential or that a substitute or slight variation would not affect the invention. A person skilled in the art is a Canadian legal fiction used in patent law that is meant to denote someone of practical skill and knowledge in the subject matter of the patent, such as a technician. A Person Skilled in the Art is similar to the American standard of Person Having Ordinary Skill in the Art.

A patented invention is thus separated into essential and non-essential elements. For an element to be classified as non-essential, it must be true that either:

1. The words, interpreted purposively, make it clear that the element is not essential, or
2. That, as of the date of publication, a person skilled in the art would have known of a substitute or variation that would not have affected how the invention works

Any element that is not classified as non-essential is considered essential. If a patent is clear that an element is essential, then that element will be essential even if, at the time of publication of the patent, an element could be easily substituted or varied.

=== Infringement ===
It is an infringement to make, construct, or sell a thing that copies the essential elements of a patented invention without permission. Substitution or omission of a non-essential elements is not sufficient to make something non-infringing. The Canadian patent holder thus receives protection "against a device that performs substantially the same function in substantially the same way to obtain substantially the same result", similar to the protection available to an American patent holder under the doctrine of equivalents.

Once the essential elements of the patented invention are established, determining whether there is an infringement is simply an exercise in comparison between the allegedly infringing thing and the patented invention. If the essential elements of the patented invention are present in the thing in issue, then that thing is infringing.

In general, a defendant's intention is not relevant in establishing an infringement: the fact of infringement is sufficient. An exception arises in cases of infringement by possession. You can rebut a claim of infringement by possession by showing there was no intent to use or benefit from that possession.

== Using ==
Cases alleging infringement based on "use" require special attention due to the difficulty in interpreting the term "use". Interpretation of the term "use" begins with the plain meaning of the words "use" and its French complement "exploiter". "Exploiter" was found to lend clarification to the term "use" in patent law, leading to a definition of "utilization with a view to production or advantage". Following the rules of statutory interpretation, this plain meaning of "use" was interpreted based on the purpose of the Patent Act, the context of the other words in the provision, and the wisdom of case law. In the context of patent infringement, "use" is defined as any activity that "deprives the inventor in whole or in part, directly or indirectly, of full enjoyment of the monopoly conferred by law".

the court, in Monsanto Canada Inc. v. Schmeiser, summarizes the interpretation of "use":

1. "Use" or "exploiter", in their ordinary dictionary meaning, denote utilization with a view to production or advantage.
2. The basic principle in determining whether the defendant has "used" a patented invention is whether the inventor has been deprived, in whole or in part, directly or indirectly, of the full enjoyment of the monopoly conferred by the patent.
3. If there is a commercial benefit to be derived from the invention, it belongs to the patent holder.
4. It is no bar to a finding of infringement that the patented object or process is a part of or composes a broader unpatented structure or process, provided the patented invention is significant or important to the defendant's activities that involve the unpatented structure.
5. Possession of a patented object or an object incorporating a patented feature may constitute "use" of the object's stand-by or insurance utility and thus constitute infringement.
6. Possession, at least in commercial circumstances, raises a rebuttable presumption of "use".
7. While intention is generally irrelevant to determining whether there has been "use" and hence infringement, the absence of intention to employ or gain any advantage from the invention may be relevant to rebutting the presumption of use raised by possession.

The court also found that "use" applies to products, processes, and their outputs - even if the output itself is unprotected. This includes output where the patented invention is an intermediary in a production process. This means that an imported, unpatented object may still infringe a patent if its production infringed the patent.

"Use" can also be established when the invention is not used for its intended process. It is sufficient to show that the invention was used to the defendant's benefit. Deriving a benefit from a patented invention is deemed to deprive the patent holder of full enjoyment of the monopoly.

=== As a part or composition ===
It is considered an infringement to manufacture, use, or even seek to use an unpatented object without permission if part of that object is patented, and the patented part is significant or important. The patented part must be significant or important because it must be shown that it is used when the encompassing unpatented object is used. In Monsanto Canada Inc. v. Schmeiser, it was found that the use of a plant which contained patented genes and cells constitutes infringing use of the patented genes and cells.

=== Possession ===
Monsanto Canada Inc. v. Schmeiser established that possession may be sufficient for infringement if some value is derived from the act of possession. It was found that possession can grant an "insurance value" to the possessor. Examples include emergency equipment or backups in case of failure. Monsanto also found that the defendant's use of a genetically modified crop was infringing even though the defendant did not use the genetic benefit (a resistance to a pesticide) - it was sufficient to show that the defendant had a benefit in case it became necessary to take advantage of the benefit. The benefit received by the defendant in cases of possession correspond to a deprivation of the patent holder's full enjoyment of the monopoly and is thus an infringement of the patent.

In general, a defendant's intention is not relevant in establishing an infringement; however, intent does become important when infringement is alleged through possession. There must be an intent to use the patented article for there to be a corresponding detriment to the patent holder and thus an infringement. Possession creates a presumption of intention to use; the burden is on the defendant to rebut this presumption.

=== Output from a patented process or product ===
A patent holder's rights extend to articles that were manufactured in a manner that infringed the patent. This protection extends to use of patented processes or products including intermediaries. The court in Pfizer Canada Inc. v. Canada (Health), found that a finding of infringement should be based on the nature of the invention and the extent to which it was used in production. The court outlined the following factors in determining whether there is an infringement:

- The importance of the product or process to the final product sold into Canada. Where the use is incidental, non-essential or could readily be substituted..., a Court might be less inclined to find infringement.
- Whether the final product actually contains all or part of the patented product. Where the patented product can actually be identified in the product sold into Canada, there may be a strong case for a finding of infringement.
- The stage at which the patented product or process is used. For example, use of a process as a preliminary step of a lengthy production process may lead to a conclusion that the patentee has suffered little deprivation.
- The number of instances of use made of the patented product or process. Where the same patented product is used repetitively through the production of the non-patented end product, there may be clearer evidence that the advantage of the patentee has been impaired.
- The strength of the evidence demonstrating that, if carried out or used in Canada, the product or process would constitute infringement. On this point, my opinion would be that, where there is ambiguity in the evidence, the benefit of the doubt should go to the party using the product or process. This is, perhaps, simply another way of expressing the established principle that the patentee bears the burden of proving infringement.

The court concludes that a "strong link" must be "established between the use of the patented process or product and the product sold into Canada."

== Inducement or contributory infringement ==
It is a patent infringement to induce someone else to infringe a patent. A patent can be a composition of unpatented components; the patent would cover the inventive step of selecting and assembling those components. Manufacture of the unpatented components would not be an infringement of the patent unless the manufacturer induces the recipient of those components to infringe the patent.

Windsurfing International Inc. v. Trilantic Corp. dealt with a manufacturer selling the unassembled components of a patented sailboard. In the court's decision, Urie J stated:

Without assembly there can be no purpose in a purchaser buying the unassembled parts since, unassembled, they cannot be used for the purpose for which they are purchased, that is, to sail. To suggest that a patent infringement suit can be successfully avoided by selling parts as components of a kit in contradistinction to their sale assembled is, in my view, errant nonsense.

In MacLennan v. Produits Gilbert Inc., the court established a three-pronged test to determine whether there has been an inducement:

1. There must be an act of infringement by the direct infringer.
2. This act must be influenced by the seller to the point where, without this influence, infringement by the buyer would not otherwise take place.
3. The influence must be knowingly exercised by the seller, i.e., the seller knows that this influence will result in the completion of the act of infringement.

Unlike in America and Britain, it is not an infringement to produce or sell an unpatented replacement part, even if the only possible use for that replacement part is in a patented invention. To establish indirect infringement, it must be shown that the alleged inducer knowingly exercised influence that would result in direct infringement.

In MacLennan v. Produits Gilbert Inc., the manufacturer of replacement parts was found to have knowingly induced patent infringement by indicating its intended use in its competitor's product when selling the components.

== Standing: Right to Sue ==
Subsection 55(1) of the Patent Act provides standing to the patentee and any person "claiming under" the patentee to sue for damages:

55. (1) A person who infringes a patent is liable to the patentee and to all persons claiming under the patentee for all damage sustained by the patentee or by any such person, after the grant of the patent, by reason of the infringement.

The question of who qualifies as a person "claiming under" a patentee has been analyzed numerous times by Canadian courts. In particular, the Supreme Court of Canada has confirmed that a non-exclusive licensee may sue for patent infringement.

In another leading case, the Federal Court of Appeal broadened the pool of persons "claiming under" the patentee:

[...] a person “claiming under” the patentee is a person who derives his rights to use the patented invention, at whatever degree, from the patentee. The right to use an invention is one the monopoly to which is conferred by a patent. When a breach of that right is asserted by a person who can trace his title in a direct line back to the patentee, that person is “claiming under” the patentee. It matters not by what

technical means the acquisition of the right to use may have taken place. It may be a straightforward assignment or a licence. It may, as I have indicated, be a sale of an article embodying the invention. It may also be a lease thereof. What matters is that the claimant asserts a right in the monopoly and that the source of that right may be

traced back to the patentee. [...]

== Significant Canadian patent cases ==
- Free World Trust v. Électro Santé Inc., 2000 SCC 66, [2000] 2 SCR 1024 (15 December 2000)
- Whirlpool Corp. v. Camco Inc., 2000 SCC 67, [2000] 2 SCR 1067 (15 December 2000)
- Monsanto Canada Inc. v. Schmeiser, 2004 SCC 34, [2004] 1 SCR 902 (21 May 2004)
- Pfizer Canada Inc. v. Canada (Health), 2007 FC 898 (5 October 2007)
- MacLennan v. Produits Gilbert Inc., 2008 FCA 35 (29 January 2008)

== See also ==
- Patent infringement
- Defences, remedies in Canadian patent law
