= Shell Oil Co v Canada (Commissioner of Patents) =

- Supreme Court of Canada

Hearing: March 30 and 31, 1982 Judgment: November 2, 1982
- Citations: [1982] 2 S.C.R. 536
- Prior history: none
- Ruling: Appeal Allowed

Court membership
- Chief Justice: Bora Laskin; Puisne Justices: Roland Ritchie, Brian Dickson, Jean Beetz, Willard Estey, William McIntyre, Julien Chouinard, Antonio Lamer, Bertha Wilson

Reasons given
- Unanimous reasons by: Wilson J.
- Laskin C.J., Estey J., Chouinard J. and Lamer J. took no part in the consideration or decision of the case.

Shell Oil Co v Canada (Commissioner of Patents), [1982] 2 S.C.R. 536, is a landmark decision by the Supreme Court of Canada in the area of Canadian patent law. Prior to this decision, there was no general principle of patent law, and no direct authority, for the proposition that a new use of an old compound can be claimed as a patentable invention. Furthermore, the decision is a leading case on the test for patentable "art".

== Background ==
Shell Oil discovered that compounds having a specific chemical structure have useful properties in respect of the regulation of the growth of plants. Some of the chemical compositions it identified were new, while others were old.

Shell Oil initially sought a patent on the chemical compositions themselves, but later it withdrew its claims for those. It instead sought to claim the chemical compositions in terms of their utility.

In its submissions to the Supreme Court, Shell Oil took the position that the invention was not in the substances themselves, but in the discovery of a new use for these known chemical compositions, namely as plant growth regulators. The issue before the Court was whether such a discovery is a patentable invention.

== Reasons of the Court ==
The definition of “invention” in section 2 of the Patent Act includes "any new and useful art". In determining whether Shell Oil's discovery is a patentable "art", Justice Wilson, for the Court, stated:

What then is the “invention” under s. 2? I believe it is the application of this new knowledge to effect a desired result which has an undisputed commercial value and that it falls within the words “any new and useful art”. I think the word “art” in the context of the definition must be given its general connotation of “learning” or “knowledge” as commonly used in expressions such as “the state of the art” or “the prior art”. [Shell Oil]’s discovery in this case has added to the cumulative wisdom on the subject of these compounds by a recognition of their hitherto unrecognized properties and it has established the method whereby these properties may be realized through practical application. In my view, this constitutes a “new and useful art” and the compositions are the practical embodiment of the new knowledge.

After defining the term “art” broadly as requiring the practical application of new knowledge to effect a desired result which has an undisputed commercial value, the Court concluded that the discovery of a new use of an old compound, in this case the newly discovered means of regulating the growth of plants, is accordingly a “new and useful art”. Consequently, the Court referred the matter back to the Commissioner of Patents for the issue of a patent.

== Definition of "art" ==
In view of the above, the definition of the term "art" as articulated by Justice Wilson for the Supreme Court is generally cited as including a process that:

1. is not a disembodied idea but has a method of practical application;
2. is a new and innovative method of applying skill or knowledge; and
3. has a result or effect that is commercially useful.

== See also ==
- Novelty and non-obviousness in Canadian patent law
- Subject matter in Canadian patent law
- List of Supreme Court of Canada cases (Laskin Court)
