= Diversified Products Corp v Tye-Sil Corp =

Judgement of the Canadian Federal Court of Appeal

- Court: Federal Court of Appeal
- Decided: February 7, 1991
- Citation: [1991] F.C.J. No. 124, 35 C.P.R. (3d) 350

Court membership
- Judges sitting: Pratte, Marceau, and Décary JJ.A.

Case opinions
- Décary J.A., concurrence by Marceau J.A.

Keywords
- Patent, Presumption of Validity, Anticipation, Obviousness

Diversified Products Corp v Tye-Sil Corp is a Canadian Federal Court of Appeal decision concerning the presumption of validity in Canadian patent law and novelty.

== Presumption of validity ==
The Court of Appeal considered the effect of the presumption of validity of a registered patent. Section 45 of the Patent Act provides that a patent granted under the Act is valid "in the absence of any evidence to the contrary". The trial judge had adopted a high standard for rebutting the presumption, where the onus to disprove the presumption is "not an easy one to discharge". Décary J.A., for the Court, rejected this approach. The Court of Appeal concluded that the presumption of validity merely gives rise to an evidentiary burden on a balance of probabilities.

=== Novelty ===
The Court of Appeal cited with approval jurisprudence that stands for the proposition that "an impractical and inoperable device cannot be an anticipation". The invention dealt with a conventional rowing machine usable in an upright position. The Court found that the prior art, which was an exercise machine, was impracticable and inoperable in the vertical position. Consequently, the patent was not anticipated.

=== Non-obviousness ===
The Court further determined that the invention was not obvious.

== See also ==
- Presumption of validity in Canadian patent law
- Novelty and non-obviousness in Canadian patent law
