= Subject matter in Canadian patent law =

In Canadian patent law, only “inventions” are patentable. Under the Patent Act, only certain categories of things may be considered and defined as inventions. Therefore, if a patent discloses an item that fulfills the requirements of novelty, non-obviousness and utility, it may nonetheless be found invalid on the grounds that it does not fall within one of the statutory categories of “invention”. Since the Patent Act, the categories of patentable subject matter have been defined and interpreted by Canadian courts.

== Definition and categories of invention ==
Section 2 of the Patent Act defines “invention” as:

[A]ny new and useful art, process, machine, manufacture or composition of matter, or any new and useful improvement in any art, process, machine, manufacture or composition of matter.

Each of the five categories of inventions has been further defined by the Canadian Intellectual Property Office and the Canadian courts.

=== Art ===
Shell Oil Co. v. Commissioner of Patents defined the term “art” broadly as the application of knowledge to effect a desired result. A narrower interpretation of the term was offered by Lawson v. Canada (Commissioner of Patents):

An art or operation is an act or series of acts performed by some physical agent upon some physical object and producing in such object some change either of character or of condition.

=== Process ===
A process is the application of a method to a material or materials. The process may be patentable even if the process does not produce a patentable product.

In Tennessee Eastman Co. v. Commissioner of Patents, the Supreme Court of Canada concluded that medical or therapeutic methods are not contemplated in the definition of invention as a kind of process.

=== Machine ===
The Canadian Intellectual Property Office's Manual of Patent Office Practice has defined a machine as the mechanical embodiment of any function or mode of operation designed to accomplish a particular effect.

=== Manufacture ===
Manufacture implies a product made by hand, by machine, industrially, by mass production and so forth, by changing the character or condition of material objects. Harvard College v. Canada (Commissioner of Patents), as discussed below, has held that higher life forms, such as genetically altered mice, do not fall within the meaning of manufacture.

=== Composition of matter ===
“Composition of matter” is defined as a combination of ingredients or substances – a solid, gas, or fluid – as a chemical union or a physical mixture. This definition has been taken to include enzymes, reproducible modified genes, and the cells that carry them. However, Harvard College v. Canada (Commissioner of Patents) has drawn a distinction between lower and higher life forms (see below). Where an invention is a combination of elements, the elements must produce something that is more than a mere sum of their individual effects. In other words, if each element functions independently and there is no common result, there is no inventive composition.

=== Improvements ===
Most inventions are not pioneering inventions in a new field or industry, but are rather improvements to existing arts, processes, machines, manufacturers and compositions of matter. It has been held that a newfound medical use for a known and patented pharmaceutical compound may qualify as an improvement in an art. The elimination of an element from a previously patented composition which results in a new and useful improvement may also be patentable.

== Excluded and contentious subject matter ==
=== Scientific principles and abstract theorems ===
Section 27(8) of the Patent Act provides:

No patent shall be granted for any mere scientific principle or abstract theorem.

This is the only section within the Patent Act that explicitly excludes certain subject matter from patents. Practical applications of scientific principles and abstract theorems, however, are not excluded from patentability. Therefore, while Newton's law of universal gravitation may not be patentable, a patent may be granted for the practical application of the theory, such as an improved gravity pump.

=== Higher life forms: Harvard and Schmeiser ===
In Harvard College v. Canada (Commissioner of Patents), Harvard researchers appealed the Commissioner of Patent's rejection of their patent application for genetically altered mice that possess an oncogene, termed oncomice, as well as the process by which the oncomice were created. The Supreme Court of Canada, by a narrow 5 to 4 majority, found that the Patent Act, specifically the categories of “manufacture” and “composition of matter” did not cover higher life forms:

Owing to the fact that the patenting of higher life forms is a highly contentious and complex matter that raises serious practical, ethical and environmental concerns that the Act does not contemplate, I conclude that the Commissioner was correct to reject the patent application. This is a policy issue that raises questions of great significance and importance and that would appear to require a dramatic expansion of the traditional patent regime. Absent explicit legislative direction, the Court should not order the Commissioner to grant a patent on a higher life form.

Two years later, in Monsanto Canada Inc. v. Schmeiser, an equally narrow majority of the Supreme Court found that a farmer, by knowingly growing a crop containing genetically modified genes and cells that was not purchased, had infringed Monsanto's patent. Schmeiser, the farmer, argued that, per Harvard College v. Canada (Commissioner of Patents), higher life forms, such as plants, do not constitute patentable subject matter in Canada, even though Monsanto's patent was only directed to the modified gene and the cells containing the gene. This argument was rejected by a majority of the Court, which found that “[w]hether or not patent protection for the gene and the cell extends to activities involving the plant is not relevant to the patent’s validity”, and since Monsanto did not claim a patent for a genetically modified plant per se, its claim of the gene and the cell was considered patentable subject matter.

The distinction drawn in Harvard between higher and lower life forms has been criticized as one that is difficult to draw and has no logical basis. However, after Monsanto Canada Inc. v. Schmeiser, this distinction may not even matter anymore because even though, per Harvard College v. Canada (Commissioner of Patents), higher life forms such as plants or animals are not patentable, Monsanto Canada Inc. v. Schmeiser has nonetheless given patent protection to these higher life forms by allowing protection for the modified genes and cells that compose the plant or animal.

=== Business methods: Amazon's one-click shopping patent ===
In 1998, Amazon.com filed a patent application for a “Method and System For Placing A Purchase Order Via A Communication Network”. This invention allowed customers shopping online to make purchases with one-click buying, which circumvents the process of entering address and billing information in the traditional shopping cart mode of online shopping. The Commissioner of Patents rejected the patent finding that the substance of the claims were directed to a "business method". The Commissioner argued "business methods" were excluded as patentable subject matter.

Amazon.com appealed the matter to the Federal Court. The Federal Court rejected the Commissioner's characterization of "business methods" as an excluded category of subject matter. The court found that instead the patent's claims should be assessed against the five categories of statutory subject matter found in the Patent Act. Justice Phelan held that purposive construction of the claims clearly disclosed a "machine" and thus were patentable subject matter. The court ordered the application sent back to the Commissioner for expedited re‑examination with the direction that the claims constitute patentable subject matter. The Commissioner of Patents appealed to the Federal Court of Appeal.

At the Federal Court of Appeal, court agreed with much of the judgement of the Federal Court, but found that it was inappropriate for the Federal Court to engage in claims construction absent a "foundation of knowledge about the relevant art". The Federal Court of Appeal remanded the construction of the patent claims back to the Commissioner for expedited re-examination.

The Commissioner of Patents issued the patent in December 2011. In March 2013, the Canadian Patent Office issued guidance on revised office practice.

On March 8, 2013, the Canadian Patent Office announced changes in patent examination practice based on the ruling in the Amazon.com case. CIPO published new guidelines for determining whether an invention constitutes statutory subject matter based on a purposive construction of the claims. Updated guidance on examination practice for computer-related inventions was also published at the same time.
