= Schlumberger Canada Ltd v Canada (Commissioner of Patents) =

Judgement of the Canadian Federal Court of Appeal

- Court: Federal Court of Appeal
- Decided: June 15, 1981
- Citation: [1981] F.C. 845, 38 N.R. 299, 56 C.P.R. (2d) 204

Case history
- Subsequent actions: Leave to appeal to SCC refused, 63 C.P.R. (2d) 261-1

Court membership
- Judges sitting: Pratte J., Ryan J., and Kerr D.J.

Keywords
- Patent, Software, Computer

Schlumberger Canada Ltd v Canada (Commissioner of Patents) is a decision of the Federal Court of Appeal concerning the patentability of software inventions within the context of the Patent Act (Canada). At issue was the patentability of a method of combining and analyzing borehole measurements for oil and gas exploration using a computer programmed according to mathematical formulas. The Federal Court of Appeal held that the use of a computer "does not change the nature" of the discovered invention and that the process at issue was a "mere scientific principle or abstract theorem" and therefore not an "invention" within the meaning of the Patent Act.

More broadly, the case stands for the proposition that the use of a computer neither adds to, nor subtracts from, the patentability of an alleged invention.

== Background ==
In oil and gas exploration, data is collected by taking measurements using instruments lowered into boreholes in geological formations. However, these measurements are not always useful to geologists. Schlumberger researchers (the appellants) developed a method to combine and analyze measurements to yield more meaningful information. The application described a process where the borehole measurements were recorded to magnetic tape and processed by a computer for mathematical processing and display.

== Arguments by the Parties ==
=== Respondent's Arguments ===
The Commissioner of Patents argued that a computer program, even if it satisfied the novelty and utility requirements for patentability, was not an "invention" as defined in section 2 of the Patent Act.

=== Appellant's Arguments ===
Schlumberger argued that the invention was not the computer program, but rather the process of "transforming measurements into useful information." Schlumberger argued that the definition of "invention" in the Patent Act did not exclude inventions involving computers and so there was no reason the process was not a patentable invention.

== Federal Court of Appeal Ruling ==
The court found in favour of the government, ruling that the application did not disclose a patentable invention.

The court started by observing that a mathematical formula would fall within the phrase "mere scientific principle or abstract theorem", then in section 27(8) of the Patent Act, for which "no patent shall issue". The court noted that if the calculations in the invention were performed by men rather than computers, then they would not be patentable.

The court reasoned that there was nothing new in using computers to make mathematical calculations. The court then rejected the appellant's argument that the operations were steps in a process, finding that, if the contention were true, it would have the effect that the "mere fact" of the use of a computer to perform the calculations would transform an unpatentable discovery (a mathematical formula) into patentable subject matter. The court found this unacceptable, holding that "the fact that a computer is or should be used to implement discovery does not change the nature of that discovery."

In view of the above, the Court dismissed the appellant's appeal.

== See also ==
- Subject matter in Canadian patent law
- Software patents under Canadian patent law
