= Utility in Canadian patent law =

In Canadian patent law, inventions must be useful, in addition to novel and non-obvious, in order to be patented.

== General principles ==
Although utility can be demonstrated by commercial success, it only requires that the invention is directed to a practical use and that it does what is indicated in the patent. The mechanism underlying an invention's function does not need to be disclosed in the patent. If a mechanism is proposed in the patent but is subsequently disproven, the patent is not invalidated.

An invention is useful if it does what it promises; following the directions should result in the desired effect. The inventor does not have to have created the product of the invention, but the specifications must disclose an actual way to do so.

A patent is addressed to a person skilled in the art, and any prior art and knowledge that such a person would have can be taken into consideration when the patent is being interpreted by the courts. If a patent's scope is so broad that a person skilled in the art could follow its specifications and not get the useful result, the invention is not useful.

To be valid, a patent's usefulness must be established, whether by demonstration or by sound prediction, at the time of the patent application. Any evidence of utility after this date is irrelevant, regardless of when the patent's validity is challenged. Later proof of an invention's inutility can be used to invalidate a patent.

== Sound prediction ==
The utility of an invention can be established by sound prediction where “utility can be predicted in advance of complete testing." This is a question of fact, and there are three prongs to the doctrine:

1. There must be a factual basis for the prediction.
2. The inventor must have an articulable and sound line of reasoning from which the desired result can be inferred from the factual basis.
3. There must be proper disclosure.

== Rationale ==
The grant of a patent gives the inventor a monopoly in the market for its product. This monopoly is granted in exchange for the disclosure of the invention which can be further developed by society. The requirement that the invention is useful ensures that society receives accurate and complete disclosure.

That a patent does not have to be economically useful is justified by the fact that these kinds of discoveries may lay the foundation for more profitable discoveries.

The basis for the doctrine of sound prediction is the expedited disclosure of inventions. By ensuring that these inventions are not speculation or misinformation, the public domain remains uncluttered.

== See also ==
- Apotex Inc v Wellcome Foundation Ltd
- X v Canada (Commissioner of Patents)
