= Manual of Patent Office Practice =

Canadian legal guidance document

The Manual of Patent Office Practice (MOPOP) is a manual for patent agents and patent examiners, published by the Canadian Intellectual Property Office (CIPO). It documents the procedures and practices relative to the prosecution of patent applications under Canadian patent law for patent examiners, applicants, agents, and the public at large.

The MOPOP occupies a position in Canadian patent law comparable to that occupied by the Manual of Patent Examining Procedure (MPEP) in United States patent law.

== See also ==
- Patent Act (Canada)
- Manual of Patent Examining Procedure (MPEP) (United States patent law)
- Guidelines for Examination in the European Patent Office
