= Presumption of validity in Canadian patent law =

The presumption of validity refers to the fact that, once a patent has been issued, the courts will presume that it is valid, unless there is evidence to the contrary.

== Canada ==
Section 43(2) of the Patent Act creates the presumption of validity:

After the patent is issued, it shall, in the absence of any evidence to the contrary, be valid and avail the patentee and the legal representatives of the patentee for the term mentioned in section 44 or 45, whichever is applicable.

In Diversified Products Corp v Tye-Sil Corp, the Federal Court of Appeal held that the presumption of validity merely gives rise to an evidential burden on a balance of probabilities.
