= X v Canada (Commissioner of Patents) =

Judgement of the Canadian Federal Court of Appeal

- Court: Federal Court of Appeal
- Decided: November 16, 1981
- Citation: [1981] F.C.J. No. 1013, 59 C.P.R. (2d) 7

Court membership
- Judges sitting: Thurlow C.J., Ryan J., and Kelly D.J.

Keywords
- Patent, Utility

X v Canada (Commissioner of Patents) is a decision by the Federal Court of Appeal concerning the utility requirement for patenting an invention in Canada.

== Background ==
The patent application in issue was for a "death ray", more particularly, a device that creates a path of ionized air using a laser beam to transmit electrical energy without wires.

The invention had not been constructed by the inventor because of the significant cost of doing so. The Commissioner of Patents refused the patent application on the ground that the death ray was "inoperable for the purpose for which it was designed."

== Decision ==
Chief Justice Thurlow, for the Court, found that the patent did not disclose how a technical challenge would be addressed and was not written clearly enough to enable a person skilled in the art to make or use the invention. In addition, he concluded the Commissioner's comments concerning the absence of a working model of the invention and describing the invention as an abstract theorem were obiter and were not relevant to the application's refusal.

In view of the above, the Court dismissed the inventor's appeal and affirmed the decision of the Commissioner of Patents.

== See also ==
- Utility in Canadian patent law
