= 1-Click =

Online purchasing with only a single mouse click

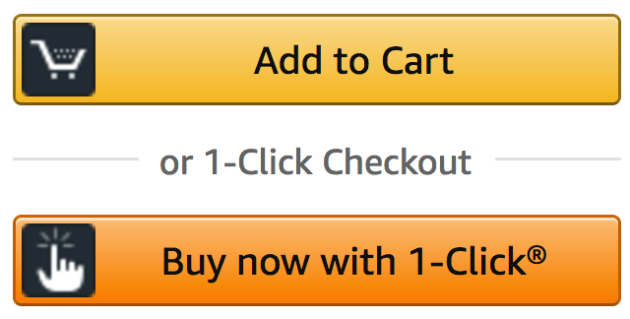
Amazon.com offering the option to either add an item to the user's cart, or purchase it immediately using 1-Click

1-Click, also called one-click or one-click buying, is the technique of allowing customers to make purchases with the payment information needed to complete the purchase having been entered by the user previously. More particularly, it allows an online shopper using an Internet marketplace to purchase an item without having to use shopping cart software. Instead of manually inputting billing and shipping information for a purchase, a user can use one-click buying to use a predefined address and credit card number to purchase one or more items. Since the expiration of Amazon's patent, there has been an advent of checkout experience platforms, such as ShopPay, Simpler, PeachPay, Zplit, and Bolt which offer similar one-click checkout flows.

== Patent ==
The United States Patent and Trademark Office (USPTO) issued a patent for this technique to Amazon.com in September 1999. Amazon.com also owns the "1-Click" trademark.

On May 12, 2006, the USPTO ordered a reexamination of the "One-Click" patent, based on a request filed by Peter Calveley. Calveley cited as prior art an earlier e-commerce patent and the Digicash electronic cash system.

On October 9, 2007, the USPTO issued an office action in the reexamination which confirmed the patentability of some of the claims of the patent, while rejecting some of the other claims, including the broadest ones. In November 2007, Amazon responded by amending the broadest claims to restrict them to a shopping cart model of commerce. They also submitted several hundred references for the patent examiner to consider. In March 2010, the reexamined and amended patent was allowed.

Amazon's U.S. patent expired on September 11, 2017.

In Europe, a patent application on 1-Click ordering was filed with the European Patent Office (EPO) but was rejected by the EPO in 2007 due to obviousness; the decision was upheld in 2011. A related gift-ordering patent was granted in 2003, but revoked in 2007 following an opposition.

In Canada, the Federal Court of Canada in Amazon.com Inc v Canada (Commissioner of Patents) held that the One click patent could not be rejected as a pure business method since it had a physical effect. The Court remanded the application to the Canadian patent office for a reexamination.

== Licensing ==
=== Apple Inc. ===
Amazon.com in 2000 licensed 1-Click ordering to Apple Computer (now Apple Inc.) for use on its online store. Apple subsequently added 1-Click ordering to the iTunes Store and iPhoto. Apple paid $1 million to license the patent.

=== Barnes & Noble ===
Amazon filed a patent infringement lawsuit in October 1999 in response to Barnes & Noble's offering a 1-Click ordering option called "Express Lane". After reviewing the evidence, a judge issued a preliminary injunction ordering Barnes & Noble to stop offering Express Lane until the case was settled. Barnes & Noble had developed a way to design around the patent by requiring shoppers to make a second click to confirm their purchase. The lawsuit was settled in 2002. The terms of the settlement, including whether or not Barnes & Noble took a license to the patent or paid any money to Amazon, were not disclosed.

In response to the lawsuit, the Free Software Foundation urged a boycott of Amazon.com. The boycott was lifted by GNU in September 2002.

== See also ==
- Business method patent, a class of patents which disclose and claim new methods of doing business
