= Apotex Inc v Wellcome Foundation Ltd =

- Supreme Court of Canada

Hearing: February 14, 2002 Judgment: December 5, 2002
- Full case name: Apotex Inc. and Novopharm Ltd. v. Wellcome Foundation Limited, Glaxo Wellcome Inc., Interpharm Inc. and Allen Barry Shechtman
- Citations: 2002 SCC 77, [2002] 4 S.C.R. 153
- Docket No.: 28287
- Prior history: Judgment against Apotex in the Federal Court of Appeal.
- Ruling: Appeal dismissed.

Holding
- The doctrine of sound prediction is a valid way of determining the utility of a patent.

Court membership
- Chief Justice: Beverley McLachlin; Puisne Justices: Claire L'Heureux-Dubé, Charles Gonthier, Frank Iacobucci, John C. Major, Michel Bastarache, Ian Binnie, Louise Arbour, Louis LeBel

Reasons given
- Unanimous reasons by: Binnie J.

Apotex Inc v Wellcome Foundation Ltd [2002] 4 S.C.R. 153, 2002 SCC 77, is a leading Supreme Court of Canada decision on the utility requirement for a patent in Canada. The Court rejected a challenge by the generic drug manufacturers Novopharm and Apotex to declare Glaxo Wellcome's patent for AZT, an AIDS-fighting drug, invalid.

== Background ==
Beginning in 1983, a team at Glaxo Wellcome began researching an anti-AIDS drug. The team hoped to develop a chain terminator to halt HIV in the reverse-transcription stage of its HIV life cycle. Drugs selected on the basis of their chemical structure were screened starting in 1984.

One of the drugs screened at that time is what is now known as AZT. This drug was originally synthesized by cancer researchers in 1964, in a project that was eventually abandoned. Since that time, Glaxo Wellcome had been developing AZT as an anti-bacterial.

In vitro testing on mouse cells revealed that AZT was potentially effective against AIDS. Glaxo Wellcome was not equipped to do testing of the drug on human cell lines, so it contracted with the National Institutes of Health for this work. In February 1985, the NIH reported the positive results of their screening to Glaxo Wellcome, and, on March 16, 1985, Glaxo Wellcome filed a patent application for a new use of AZT in the United Kingdom.

The validity of this patent was brought into question by the appellant generic drug manufacturers.

== Reasons of the Court ==
=== Utility ===
The generic manufacturers claimed that the patent did not satisfy the utility requirement. Justice Binnie, for the Court, considered the doctrine of sound prediction to determine whether the invention was useful. There are three elements. First, there must be a factual basis for the prediction at the date that it was filed. Second, the inventor must have a sound line of reasoning from which the desired result can be inferred from the factual basis. Third, there must be proper disclosure. As Justice Binnie believed that predictability is a question of fact, he relied on the trial judge's findings and determined that all three requirements for sound prediction were satisfied. At the time the patent application was filed, Glaxo Wellcome knew that AZT was suitable for prolonged treatment of humans, that compounds of its class could act as chain terminators, and that in vitro efficacy had been shown in human cells.

In applying the doctrine of sound prediction, Justice Binnie noted that the doctrine is can be applied generally but that steps should be taken to ensure that it is not abused by "[dilution] to include a lucky guess or mere speculation."

=== Covetous Claiming ===
The patent claimed that AZT had both prophylactic and treatment properties. The generic manufacturers attacked the patent on the grounds that there was no sound basis to predict that the drug had any prophylactic properties. The Court did not accept this argument, instead holding that the definition of "prophylaxis" includes "prevention of the development of signs and symptoms of the disease [AIDS] without necessarily eradicating the causal factor [HIV]".

=== Inventorship ===
The generic drug manufacturers also sought to have the patent declared invalid on the grounds that the NIH researchers who did the human cell screening were not identified in the patent as co-inventors. Justice Binnie concluded that, to be considered a co-inventor, a person must have participated in the inventive concept and not merely its verification.

== See also ==
- List of Supreme Court of Canada cases (McLachlin Court)
- Utility in Canadian patent law
