= Monsanto Canada Inc v Schmeiser =

Supreme Court of Canada decision

- Supreme Court of Canada

Hearing: January 20, 2004 Judgment: May 21, 2004
- Full case name: Percy Schmeiser and Schmeiser Enterprises Limited v Monsanto Canada Incorporated and Monsanto Company
- Citations: [2004] 1 S.C.R. 902, 2004 SCC 34, 239 D.L.R. (4th) 271, 31 C.P.R. (4th) 161
- Docket No.: 29437
- Ruling: Monsanto appeal allowed in part

Court membership
- Chief Justice: Beverley McLachlin; Puisne Justices: John C. Major, Michel Bastarache, Ian Binnie, Louis LeBel, Marie Deschamps, Morris Fish, Rosalie Abella, Louise Charron

Reasons given
- Majority: McLachlin C.J. and Fish J. (paras. 1–106), joined by Major, Binnie, and Deschamps JJ.
- Dissent: Arbour J. (paras. 107–171), joined by Iacobucci, Bastarache, LeBel JJ.

Monsanto Canada Inc v Schmeiser [2004] 1 S.C.R. 902, 2004 SCC 34 is a leading Supreme Court of Canada case on patent rights for biotechnology, addressing a dispute between a Canadian canola farmer, Percy Schmeiser, and the agricultural biotechnology company Monsanto. The court heard the question of whether Schmeiser's intentionally growing genetically modified plants constituted "use" of Monsanto's patented genetically modified plant cells. By a 5–4 majority, the court ruled that it did. The Supreme Court also ruled 9–0 that Schmeiser did not have to pay Monsanto their technology use fee, damages or costs, as Schmeiser did not receive any benefit from the technology. The case drew worldwide attention and is widely misunderstood to concern what happens when farmers' fields are accidentally contaminated with patented seed. However, by the time the case went to trial, all claims of accidental contamination had been dropped; the court only considered the GM canola in Schmeiser's fields, which Schmeiser had intentionally concentrated and planted. Schmeiser did not put forward any defence of accidental contamination.

== Background ==
The biotechnology company Monsanto developed and patented a glyphosate-resistant gene for the canola plant which has the effect of producing canola that is resistant to glyphosate. Monsanto marketed the seed as Roundup Ready Canola. Farmers using the system are able to control weed competition using Roundup, while avoiding damage to the Roundup-resistant crops. Users are required to enter into a formal agreement with Monsanto, which specifies that new seed must be purchased every year, the purchase price of which includes a licensing fee to use the patent rights. Roundup Ready Canola was introduced in Canada in 1996, and by 1998, it accounted for 25% of the country's canola area.

=== Origin of the patented seed in Schmeiser's fields ===
As established in the original Federal Court trial decision, Percy Schmeiser, a canola breeder and grower in Bruno, Saskatchewan, first discovered Roundup-resistant canola in his crops in 1997. He had used Roundup herbicide to clear weeds around power poles and in ditches adjacent to a public road running beside one of his fields, and noticed that some of the canola which had been sprayed had survived. Schmeiser then performed a test by applying Roundup to an additional 3 to 4 acres (12,000 to 16,000 m^{2}) of the same field. He found that 60% of the canola plants survived. At harvest time, Schmeiser instructed a farmhand to harvest the test field. That seed was stored separately from the rest of the harvest and used the next year to seed approximately 1,000 acres (4.0 km^{2}) of canola.

At the time, Roundup Ready canola was in use by several farmers in the area. Schmeiser claimed that he did not plant the initial Roundup Ready canola in 1997, and that his field of custom-bred canola had been accidentally contaminated. While the origin of the plants on Schmeiser's farm in 1997 remains unclear, the trial judge found that with respect to the 1998 crop, "none of the suggested sources [proposed by Schmeiser] could reasonably explain the concentration or extent of Roundup Ready canola of a commercial quality" ultimately present in Schmeiser's 1998 crop.

=== Dispute ===
In 1998, Monsanto learned that Schmeiser was growing a Roundup-resistant crop and approached him to sign a license agreement to their patents and to pay a license fee. Schmeiser refused, maintaining that the 1997 contamination was accidental and that he owned the seed he harvested, and he could use the harvested seed as he wished because it was his physical property. Monsanto then sued Schmeiser for patent infringement, filing its case in Canadian federal court on August 6, 1998. Negotiations to settle the matter collapsed on August 10, 1999, leading Schmeiser to file a countersuit against Monsanto for $10 million for libel, trespass, and contaminating his fields.

=== Patent rights versus property rights ===
Regarding the question of patent rights and the farmer's right to use seed taken from his fields, Monsanto said that because they hold a patent on the gene, and on canola cells containing the gene, they have a legal right to control its use, including the intentional replanting of seed collected from plants with the gene which grew accidentally. Schmeiser insisted on his "farmer's rights" to do anything he wished with seeds harvested from any plants grown on his field - including plants from seeds that were accidentally sown - and that this tangible property right overrides Monsanto's patent rights.

Canadian law does not mention any such "farmer's rights"; the court held that the farmer's right to save and replant seeds is simply the right of a property owner to use his or her property as he or she wishes, and hence the right to use the seeds is subject to the same legal restrictions on use rights that apply in any case of ownership of property, including restrictions arising from patents in particular. The court wrote: "Thus a farmer whose field contains seed or plants originating from seed spilled into them, or blown as seed, in swaths from a neighbour's land or even growing from germination by pollen carried into his field from elsewhere by insects, birds, or by the wind, may own the seed or plants on his land even if he did not set about to plant them. He does not, however, own the right to the use of the patented gene, or of the seed or plant containing the patented gene or cell."

=== Publicity ===
Beginning with the lead-up to the initial Federal Court trial, the case drew widespread public attention and media coverage. The contest was portrayed by some as a classic David-and-Goliath confrontation between a small farmer and Monsanto, while others portrayed it as theft of the results of years of research and development. Environmental groups and anti-genetic engineering activists championed Schmeiser's cause and he spoke on the case around the world. Others depicted the case as a contest between a large biotechnology company and an equally large and well funded anti-biotechnology industry and raised concerns that the facts and context of the case was being misrepresented by Schmeiser, environmental groups and anti-genetic engineering activists.

Monsanto v. Schmeiser was portrayed as being part of the process of legally defining the bounds of new biotechnologies, including genetic engineering and ownership of higher lifeforms. The case was frequently connected with that of the so-called Harvard mouse, where in 2002 the Canadian Supreme Court had rejected a patent for a special breed of mouse developed for research by Harvard University. The Canadian Harvard mouse case was a precedent-setting case in Canada with regard to the right to own higher lifeforms, where the Canadian ruling went against findings in the US and Europe, where the Harvard mouse patent was upheld. The Canadian Supreme Court eventually took pains to point out that the Monsanto v Schmeiser case focused on genes in seeds, and not on higher life forms; it was "the first in which the top court of any country has ruled on patent issues involving plants and seed genes".

=== Initial trial and appeal ===
The issues of patent infringement and "farmer's rights" were settled, in Monsanto's favour, at the trial before the Federal Court of Canada and upheld at the appeal level before the Federal Court of Appeal. Both courts found that a key element in Mr. Schmeiser's patent infringement in his 1998 crop was that he knew or ought to have known the nature of the glyphosate-resistant seed he saved and planted.

The case was initially tried on June 5, 2000, in the Federal Court of Canada, at Saskatoon, Saskatchewan.

All claims relating to Roundup Ready canola in Schmeiser's 1997 canola crop were dropped prior to trial and the court only considered the canola in Schmeiser's 1998 fields. Regarding his 1998 crop, Schmeiser did not put forward any defence of accidental contamination. The evidence showed that the level of Roundup Ready canola in Mr. Schmeiser's 1998 fields was 95–98%. Evidence was presented indicating that such a level of purity could not occur by accidental means. On the basis of this the court found that Schmeiser had either known "or ought to have known" that he had planted Roundup Ready canola in 1998. Given this, the question of whether the canola in his fields in 1997 arrived there accidentally was ruled to be irrelevant. Nonetheless, at trial, Monsanto was able to present evidence sufficient to persuade the Court that Roundup Ready canola had probably not appeared in Schmeiser's 1997 field by such accidental means (paragraph 118). The court said it was persuaded "on the balance of probabilities" (the standard of proof in civil cases, meaning "more probable than not" i.e. strictly greater than 50% probability) that the Roundup Ready canola in Mr. Schmeiser's 1997 field had not arrived there by any of the accidental means, such as spillage from a truck or pollen travelling on the wind, that Mr. Schmeiser had proposed.

In the public arena, Schmeiser supporters argued that his account still leaves open the possibility that the harvesting and replanting of Roundup Ready canola from the sprayed region was accidental and resulted from a miscommunication between Schmeiser and his farmhand, or from a failure of Schmeiser to have the presence of mind to instruct his farmhand to avoid taking canola seed for replanting from the sprayed region. Supporters of Monsanto argued that an oversight of this nature is not plausible, especially in light of Schmeiser's claims regarding the extent to which he considered Roundup Ready canola undesirable in his fields and the importance he claims to have placed on the continued survival of his own strain of canola, and in light of his having been notified prior to planting his 1998 crop that Monsanto believed he had grown Roundup Ready canola in 1997. Legally, an oversight of this nature is not a defence against patent infringement, and was therefore irrelevant. Patents are civil law, and the presence or absence of "guilty intent" is not a factor in determining patent infringement. On this point, the Federal Court of Appeal noted that accidental genetic contamination of a crop beyond a farmer's control should be an exception to the rule that intent is not an issue in patent disputes.

The Court's ruling concluded:

... on the balance of probabilities, the defendants infringed a number of the claims under the plaintiffs’ Canadian patent number 1,313,830 by planting, in 1998, without leave or licence by the plaintiffs, canola fields with seed saved from the 1997 crop which seed was known, or ought to have been known by the defendants to be Roundup tolerant and when tested was found to contain the gene and cells claimed under the plaintiffs’ patent. By selling the seed harvested in 1998 the defendants further infringed the plaintiffs’ patent."

The case was then heard by the Federal Court of Appeal at Saskatoon, Saskatchewan, beginning May 15, 2002. The Federal Court of Appeal upheld the ruling of the trial judge.

The Federal Court of Appeal in particular stressed the importance of the finding that Schmeiser had knowingly used the seed, in their decision to find Schmeiser in infringement of the patent, and noted that in a case of accidental contamination or a case where the farmer knew of the presence of the gene but took no action to increase its prevalence in his crop, a different ruling could be possible (see paragraphs 55-58 of the appeal ruling). No damages were assessed against Percy Schmeiser, the private individual. Only Mr. Schmeiser's farming corporation, Schmeiser Enterprises Ltd., was held liable, as Mr. Schmeiser had acted in his capacity as director of the corporation.

Leave was requested of the Supreme Court of Canada to hear the case. This was granted in May 2003, and the appeal hearing began on January 20, 2004. The issue before the Supreme Court was whether Schmeiser's planting and cultivation of genetically modified canola constituted "use" of Monsanto's patented invention of genetically modified canola cells.

Intervening on Schmeiser's behalf were a consortium of six non-government organizations (Council of Canadians; Action Group on Erosion, Technology and Concentration; Sierra Club; National Farmers Union; Research Foundation for Science, Technology and Ecology; and the International Center for Technology Assessment) and the Attorney General of Ontario.

== Arguments ==
Schmeiser's principal defence at trial was that as he had not applied Roundup herbicide to his canola he had not used the invention. This argument was rejected; the court said that the patent granted for the invention did not specify the use of Roundup as part of the invention, and thus there was no basis for introducing the requirement that Roundup had to be used in order for the invention to be used. That is, a patent prohibits unauthorized use of an invention in any manner, not merely unauthorized use for its intended purpose.

The Court considered the question of whether knowingly (or, where one ought to have known) planting and cultivating genetically modified canola constitutes "use" of Monsanto's patented invention of genetically modified canola cells, even if the crop is not treated with Roundup and the presence of the gene affords no advantage to the farmer. The court ruled in favour of Monsanto, holding that his use of the patented genes and cells was analogous to the use of a machine containing a patented part: "It is no defence to say that the thing actually used was not patented, but only one of its components." (Supreme Court Decision, Paragraph 78) The court also held that by planting genetically modified Roundup resistant canola, Schmeiser made use of the "stand-by" or insurance utility of the invention. That is, he left himself the option of using Roundup on the crop should the need arise. This was considered to be analogous to the installation of patented pumps on a ship: even if the pumps are never actually switched on, they are still used by being available for pumping if the need arises.

== Judgment ==
On May 21, 2004, the Supreme Court ruled 5–4 in favor of Monsanto. Schmeiser won a partial victory, where the court held that he did not have to pay Monsanto his profits from his 1998 crop, since the presence of the gene in his crops had not afforded him any advantage and he had made no profits on the crop that were attributable to the invention. The amount of profits at stake was relatively small, C$19,832; however, by not having to pay damages, Schmeiser was also saved from having to pay Monsanto's legal bills, which amounted to several hundred thousand dollars and exceeded his own.

=== Reasons of the Court ===
The majority was written by McLachlin C.J. with Major, Binnie, Deschamps and Fish JJ. concurring.

The Court dismissed the argument that "use" of patented cells or genes applied only in the context of their isolated form. Nor does the fact that Schmeiser did not use Roundup herbicide on his crops preclude "use" of the gene. Even though the plants propagate without human intervention the realities of modern agriculture mean there is always human intervention in the growth of plants and thus farming is a method of "use" of plant genes.

The Court ruled that Schmeiser deprived Monsanto of its monopoly on the special canola plant by storing and planting the Roundup Ready canola seeds pursuant to his commercial interests. Thus, Schmeiser is considered to have infringed section 42 of the Patent Act. The Court, however, disagreed with the damages given by the trial judge as there was no profit directly resulting from the invention itself.

In the ruling, the court made it clear that patent infringement was the sole consideration, and concerns related to genetic engineering in agriculture were not within the scope of the case:

93 Inventions in the field of agriculture may give rise to concerns not raised in other fields -- moral concerns about whether it is right to manipulate genes in order to obtain better weed control or higher yields. It is open to Parliament to consider these concerns and amend the Patent Act should it find them persuasive.

94 Our task, however, is to interpret and apply the Patent Act as it stands, in accordance with settled principles. Under the present Act, an invention in the domain of agriculture is as deserving of protection as an invention in the domain of mechanical science. Where Parliament has not seen fit to distinguish between inventions concerning plants and other inventions, neither should the courts.

=== Dissent ===
Arbour J., writing for Iacobucci, Bastarache, and LeBel JJ., dissented in part. The reasoning of the dissent closely follows that of the majority in Harvard College v. Canada (Commissioner of Patents) that concluded that though a company can patent products and processes, they cannot patent higher forms of life such as the whole plant itself. That is, "the plant cell claim cannot extend past the point where the genetically modified cell begins to multiply and differentiate into plant tissues, at which point the claim would be for every cell in the plant" (para. 138), which would extend the patent too far. The patent can only be for the founder plant and not necessarily its offspring.

== Consequences ==
The courts at all three levels noted that the case of accidental contamination beyond the farmer's control was not under consideration but rather that Mr. Schmeiser's action of having identified, isolated and saved the Roundup-resistant seed placed the case in a different category. The appellate court also discussed a possible intermediate scenario, in which a farmer is aware of contamination of his crop by genetically modified seed, but tolerates its presence and takes no action to increase its abundance in his crop. The court held that whether such a case would constitute patent infringement remains an open question but that it was a question that did not need to be decided in the Schmeiser case (Paragraph 57 of the Appeals Court Decision).

The ruling did increase the protection available to biotechnology companies in Canada, a situation which had been left open with the Harvard mouse decision, where it was determined that a "higher lifeform", such as an animal, or by extension a plant, cannot be patented. This put Canada at odds with the other G8 countries where the patent had been granted. In Monsanto vs. Schmeiser, it was determined that protection of a patented gene or cell extends to its presence in a whole plant, even while the plant itself, as a higher lifeform, cannot be patented. This majority view, based on the precedent of mechanical devices, was central to the Supreme Court's decision, and put the onus on the Canadian Parliament to make distinctions between machines and lifeforms as it saw fit.

In 2005, a "documentary theatre" production dramatizing the court battle, entitled Seeds, by Annabel Soutar, was staged in Montreal, Quebec. The dialogue was derived entirely verbatim from various archival sources.

The case is widely cited or referenced by the anti-GM community in the context of a fear of a company claiming ownership of a farmer's crop based on the inadvertent presence of GM pollen grain or seed. "The court record shows, however, that it was not just a few seeds from a passing truck, but that Mr Schmeiser was growing a crop of 95–98% pure Roundup Ready plants, a commercial level of purity far higher than one would expect from inadvertent or accidental presence. The judge could not account for how a few wayward seeds or pollen grains could come to dominate hundreds of acres without Mr Schmeiser’s active participation, saying ‘. . .none of the suggested sources could reasonably explain the concentration or extent of Roundup Ready canola of a commercial quality evident from the results of tests on Schmeiser's crop’" - in other words, even if the original presence of Monsanto seed on his land in 1997 was inadvertent, the crop in 1998 was entirely purposeful.

== See also ==
- List of Supreme Court of Canada cases (McLachlin Court)
- Monsanto Co. v. Geertson Seed Farms
- Bowman v. Monsanto Co.
- List of Supreme Court of Canada cases
- The Future of Food
