= Harvard College v Canada (Commissioner of Patents) =

- Supreme Court of Canada

Hearing: May 21, 2002 Judgment: December 5, 2002
- Full case name: Commissioner of Patents v. President and Fellows of Harvard College
- Citations: 2002 SCC 76, 219 D.L.R. (4th) 577, 21 C.P.R. (4th) 417, [2004] 235 F.T.R. 214
- Docket No.: 28155
- Prior history: Judgment for Harvard from the Federal Court of Appeal.
- Ruling: Gov't appeal allowed

Holding
- Higher life-forms are not patentable under the meaning of "invention" in section 2 of the Patent Act

Court membership
- Chief Justice: Beverley McLachlin; Puisne Justices: Claire L'Heureux-Dubé, Charles Gonthier, Frank Iacobucci, John C. Major, Michel Bastarache, Ian Binnie, Louise Arbour, Louis LeBel

Reasons given
- Majority: Bastarache J., joined by L'Heureux-Dubé, Gonthier, Iacobucci, and LeBel JJ.
- Dissent: Binnie J., joined by McLachlin, Major, Arbour JJ.

Harvard College v. Canada (Commissioner of Patents) [2002] 3 S.C.R. 519, 2002 SCC 68 is a leading Supreme Court of Canada case concerning the patentability of higher life forms within the context of the Patent Act. At issue was the patentability of the Harvard oncomouse, a mouse that had its genome genetically altered by a cancer-promoting gene (oncogene). In a 5-4 split, the Canadian Supreme Court held that the oncomouse and higher life forms in general are not patentable subject matter in Canada.

== Background ==
Harvard College researchers (the respondents) developed a process by which they could create transgenic animals whose genomes are altered by a cancer-promoting gene (called an activated oncogene). The researchers injected the oncogene into fertilized mouse eggs close to the one-cell stage and implanted them into a female host mouse where they developed to term. The resulting offspring were then tested for the presence or absence of the oncogene. Those with the gene are referred to as "founder" mice and are mated with unaltered mice. Offspring that contain the oncogene and have every cell in their body affected (including germ cells and somatic cells) by it are referred to as oncomice. Oncomice are useful for carcinogenic studies as they are more susceptible to carcinogens. Such mice can be given material suspected of being a carcinogen and if tumours develop, it is an indication that the material is carcinogenic.

=== Initial Patent Application and Trial ===
In 1985, the President and Fellows of Harvard College applied for a patent for an invention called "transgenic animals." In particular, they applied for a process patent for the process by which they created the mice as well as a product patent for the end product of the process, namely the "founder" mice and the oncomice, offspring whose cells are affected by the gene. These patent claims also extend to all non-human mammals whose genomes have been altered in a similar manner. Patent applications on the oncomouse were filed in many countries including the United States, Canada, Europe (through the European Patent Office) and Japan.

In March 1993, the Patent Examiner rejected the product claims (Claims 1 to 12) on the grounds that higher life forms were outside the definition of "invention" in section 2 of the Canadian Patent Act and are therefore not patentable subject matter. The process claims (Claims 13 to 26) were allowed. In August 1995, the Commissioner of Patents and the Patent Appeal Board upheld the refusal to grant a patent for the product claims. This decision was upheld by the Federal Court, Trial Division, but was overturned by a majority of the Federal Court of Appeal. The Commissioner of Patents appeals from that decision.

=== Federal Court of Appeal ===
The majority of the court reversed the decision of the Federal Court and directed the Commissioner of Patents to issue a patent covering claims 1 to 12 of the Patent Application. Speaking for the majority, Rothstein J.A. emphasized the object of the Patent Act, which is to "promote the development of inventions in a manner that benefits both the inventor and the public." He stated that the Commissioner has no discretion to refuse to grant a patent under s.40 of the Act and if a process or product satisfies the requirements of the Act, a patent must be granted. Additionally, the Patent Act does not explicitly exclude living organisms such as non-human mammals from the definition of "invention." The majority concluded that the oncomouse "must be considered to be the result of both ingenuity and the laws of nature" and is an invention within the meaning of s.2 of the Patent Act, as it is both unobvious and a new and useful "composition of matter."

Isaac J.A. in dissent, approved of the approach taken by the Patent Examiner and concluded that the Commissioner of Patents must be aware of and take into consideration the public interest. He states that in a morally divisive case such as the one at hand, the court should defer to the Commissioner's decision to refuse to grant a patent.

Leave was granted to the Supreme Court on June 14, 2001.

== Supreme Court Ruling ==
The court found in favour of the government, ruling that higher life forms are not patentable. The opinion of the court was written by Bastarache J. with L'Heureux-Dubé, Gonthier, Iacobucci, and LeBel JJ. concurring. The sole question before the court was whether the words "manufacture" or "composition of matter," in the context of the Patent Act, are broad enough to encompass higher life forms such as the oncomouse. The court found that they are not. Bastarache J. stated that the determination of the patentability of higher life forms such as the oncomouse is beyond the authority of the court and would be a massive change in the current patent regime. The majority indicated that as there are significant public policy concerns at play, Parliament is best suited to address this issue.

=== The Commissioner’s Power to Refuse a Patent under Section 40 ===
Though the court believed that the Commissioner went beyond his powers in ruling against a patent on public policy reasons, the court came to the same conclusion in denying the patentability of higher life forms such as the oncomouse. The majority stated that s.40 of the Patent Act does not give the Commissioner any discretion to refuse to grant a patent on the basis of public policy considerations, echoing Pigeon J.’s statement in Monsanto Co. v. Commissioner of Patents. In terms of the standard of review, the majority believed that the question of whether higher life forms are included in the definition of "invention" in the Patent Act is reviewable on a correctness standard.

=== The Definition of "Invention": Whether a Higher Life Form Is a "Manufacture" or a "Composition of Matter" ===
==== (a) The Words of the Act ====
In s.2, the Patent Act defines an "invention" as "any new and useful art, process, machine, manufacture or composition of matter, or any new and useful improvement in any art, process, machine, manufacture or composition of matter." The majority concluded that although the definition of "invention" is broad, it does not include "anything under the sun that is made by man."

The majority held that the words "manufacture" and "composition of matter" are not sufficiently broad to include a higher life form such as the oncomouse. The court is of the opinion that "manufacture" denotes "a non-living mechanistic product or process" and does not imply a conscious, sentient living creature. The majority determined that the meaning of "composition of matter" can be ascertained by reference to the meaning of the words or phrases associated with them and thus is best read as not including higher life forms. The majority also referred to the Oxford English Dictionary definition of "composition" which is "a substance or preparation formed by combination or mixture of various ingredients" and concluded that the oncomouse cannot be understood in such terms. They also emphasized that higher life forms have unique qualities and characteristics that transcend the particular genetic matter of which they are composed.

More generally, the court is of the opinion that allowing patents on higher life forms would involve "a radical departure from the traditional patent regime" and it is for to Parliament to determine whether higher life forms are patentable.

==== (b) The Scheme of the Act ====
The majority determined that the Patent Act, in its current form, is "ill-equipped to deal appropriately with higher life forms as patentable subject matter" since biological life forms are living, capable of self-replication, incredibly complex, incapable of full description, and can contain important characteristics having nothing to do with the invention. Justice Bastarache identified some of the serious issues surrounding the patentability of higher life forms including: the agricultural impact on farmers who wish to save and reuse seeds, the rights of the "innocent bystander," who may come into possession of a patented organism by virtue of its ability to self-replicate and thus be subject to an infringement action, deterrence of biomedical research and innovation, and the potential for the commodification of human life, tissues and organs.

==== (c) The Object of the Act ====
The majority stated that the two central objects of the Patent Act are "to advance research and development and to encourage broader economic activity." Although those are broad objectives, they determined that Parliament did not leave the definition of "invention" open and neither the language nor scheme of the Act suit higher life forms. Thus, they held that Parliament did not intend to extend Patent monopoly rights over inventions related to higher life forms.

==== (d) Related Legislation: The Plant Breeders’ Rights Act ====
The majority used the fact that Parliament enacted the Plant Breeders’ Rights Act in the wake of the Supreme Court's decision in Pioneer Hi-Bred Ltd. v. Commissioner of Patents to bolster their view that Parliament did not believe the Patent Act was tailored to include higher life forms. Bastarache J. stated that since Parliament enacted specialized legislation to deal with the issues surrounding crossbred plants, a subset of higher life forms, had they wished to extend patentability to other higher life forms, they would have likely done so at the time.

=== Drawing the Line: Is it Defensible to Allow Patents on Lower Life Forms While Denying Patents on Higher Life Forms? ===
In response to the respondent's argument that drawing a line between lower and higher life forms is indefensible, Justice Bastarache stated that the line is "defensible on the basis of common sense differences between the two" and reiterates that a parliamentary response is necessary. Moreover, he stated that the distinction can also be upheld because, unlike higher life forms, a lower life form can more easily be conceptualized as a "composition of matter" or "manufacture" and microbes can be mass-produced like chemical compounds and will possess uniform properties and characteristics.

== Dissent ==
A dissent written by Binnie J., with McLachlin C.J., Arbour, and Major JJ. concurring, agreed with the reasoning of the Federal Court of Appeal and were of the opinion that the engineered oncomouse is an "extraordinary scientific achievement" and an inventive "composition of matter" within the meaning of s.2 of the Patent Act. Additionally, Binnie J. stated that other jurisdictions with comparable legislation including the United States, Europe, Japan and New Zealand, among others, have held the oncomouse to be patentable.

Binnie J. disagreed with the view of the Commissioner of Patents that at the time the Patent Act was enacted Parliament could not have intended genetically engineered higher life forms to be patentable. He stated that Parliament could not have contemplated many other future inventions including genetically engineered lower life forms, moon rockets, antibiotics, telephones, e-mail or hand-held computers." He argued that the Patent Act does not distinguish between higher and lower life forms and such a distinction is an invention of the Patent Office. He stated that efforts to draw the line between patentable lower life forms and "unpatentable" higher life forms highlight the arbitrariness of the approach.

Justice Binnie stated that once it is conceded that the genetically altered oncomouse egg meets the criteria for patentability; there is no reason for denying patentability to the resulting oncomouse on the basis that it is not an "invention" as defined by the Patent Act. He stressed that s.40 of the Patent Act does not give the Commissioner discretion to refuse a patent on public policy considerations. Additionally, Binnie J. emphasized the fact that Parliament has repealed and avoided including provisions in the Patent Act dealing with the morality of inventions as an indication that these aspects of public policy should be dealt using other regulatory regimes. He identified the Assisted Human Reproduction Act as an example of specialized legislated enacted to deal with public policy considerations similar to the ones at play in this case.

== Controversy ==
Justice Binnie noted that the outcome of this case takes Canada on a very different trajectory than other countries, including the United States, Japan and Europe. This fact has led some to argue that there is a risk that biotechnology investment will be reduced in the aftermath of the decision.

The majority's reasoning in drawing the line between higher and lower life forms was called by Dan Burk a "rationally indefensible distinction." He also said that the majority's conclusion that higher but not lower organisms are made of something other than a composition of matter is an "inexplicable reliance on vitalism" and "more properly a matter of religion than a matter of law."

Wendy Adams has found controversy in the court's belief in ethical neutrality in relation to animal welfare under the Canadian patent system. This idea is based on the idea that patents are fully constituted property rights, providing patentees with a default level of entitlement and would undoubtedly "skew the utilitarian calculus of animal welfare to the advantage of human animals and to the detriment of non-human animals." For that reason, Adams wrote that the ethical review of the treatment of animals should be an additional criterion for patentability. Abraham Drassinower has written that animal welfare issues that may arise in the course of patent applications are based on the fact that animals are considered property and these issues are best dealt with outside the confines of the Patent Act.

== See also ==
- List of Supreme Court of Canada cases (McLachlin Court)
- Oncomouse
- Biological patent
- Monsanto Canada Inc. v. Schmeiser
