= Apotex Inc v Sanofi-Synthelabo Canada Inc =

- Supreme Court of Canada

Hearing: April 16, 2008 Judgment: November 6, 2008
- Full case name: Sanofi‑Synthelabo Canada Inc., Sanofi‑Synthelabo and Minister of Health
- Citations: 2008 SCC 61, [2008] 3 S.C.R. 265
- Docket No.: 31881
- Prior history: Judgment against Apotex in the Federal Court of Appeal.
- Ruling: Appeal dismissed

Holding
- Selection patents are not invalid under the Patent Act.

Court membership
- Chief Justice: Beverley McLachlin; Puisne Justices: Michel Bastarache, Ian Binnie, Louis LeBel, Marie Deschamps, Morris Fish, Rosalie Abella, Louise Charron, Marshall Rothstein

Reasons given
- Unanimous reasons by: Rothstein J.
- McLachlin C.J. took no part in the consideration or decision of the case.

Apotex Inc v Sanofi-Synthelabo Canada Inc, [2008] 3 S.C.R. 265, 2008 SCC 61, is a leading Supreme Court of Canada decision on the novelty and non-obviousness requirements for a patent in Canada. The Court rejected a challenge by the generic drug manufacturer Apotex to declare Synthelabo Canada's patent for Plavix, an anti-coagulant drug, invalid. At issue was whether selection patents are invalid in principle, and if they are not, whether the subject selection patent was invalid on the grounds of anticipation, obviousness or double patenting.

== Reasons of the Court ==
=== Selection Patents ===
A selection patent by definition is a patent for a selection of compounds from a larger class of compounds described in a prior patent. The prior patent, often referred to as the originating patent or genus patent, is usually based on the discovery of a new reaction or class of compounds.

As with all patents, selection patents must be novel and non-obvious. The selected compounds cannot have been made before, otherwise the selection patent is not novel. But if the selected compound is novel and possesses a special property of an unexpected character, the invention is not obvious.

Justice Rothstein, for the Court, accepted that selection patents do not in their nature differ from other patents and are acceptable in principle.

=== Novelty ===
Apotex claimed that the patent did not satisfy the novelty requirement. The Supreme Court of Canada employed a two-part test for anticipation. In order for there to be a finding of anticipation, the prior art must satisfy both of the following branches:

1. prior disclosure; and
2. enablement.

The disclosure branch requires that a single prior art reference must have been available to the public and must disclose the subject matter of the claimed invention.

Once the disclosure requirement has been made out, the enablement branch must be satisfied. A disclosure is enabling if the skilled person of the art is able to work the invention. While routine trials are acceptable for this branch, no inventive steps are permitted.

The Supreme Court stated four non-exhaustive factors to be considered in determining whether there has been enablement:

1. Enablement is to be assessed having regard to the prior patent as a whole including the specification and the claims. There is no reason to limit what the skilled person may consider in the prior patent in order to discover how to perform or make the invention of the subsequent patent. The entire prior patent constitutes prior art.
2. The skilled person may use his or her common general knowledge to supplement information contained in the prior patent. Common general knowledge means knowledge generally known by persons skilled in the relevant art at the relevant time.
3. The prior patent must provide enough information to allow the subsequently claimed invention to be performed without undue burden. When considering whether there is undue burden, the nature of the invention must be taken into account. For example, if the invention takes place in a field of technology in which trials and experiments are generally carried out, the threshold for undue burden will tend to be higher than in circumstances in which less effort is normal. If inventive steps are required, the prior art will not be considered as enabling. However, routine trials are acceptable and would not be considered undue burden. But experiments or trials and errors are not to be prolonged even in fields of technology in which trials and experiments are generally carried out. No time limits on exercises of energy can be laid down; however, prolonged or arduous trial and error would not be considered routine.
4. Obvious errors or omissions in the prior patent will not prevent enablement if reasonable skill and knowledge in the art could readily correct the error or find what was omitted.

In this case, the Supreme Court concluded that the prior genus patent did not disclose the special advantages of the selection patent. Therefore, the enablement step did not need to be undertaken and the selection patent was novel.

=== Non-obviousness ===
In determining whether the subject patent was obvious, Justice Rothstein, for the Court, endorsed the four step approach from Windsurfing International Inc. v. Tabur Marine (Great Britain) Ltd., as restated in Pozzoli SPA v. BDMO SA:

1. Identify the notional "person skilled in the art" and identify the relevant common general knowledge of that person;
2. Identify the inventive concept of the claim in question or if that cannot readily be done, construe it;
3. Identify what, if any, differences exist between the matter cited as forming part of the "state of the art" and the inventive concept of the claim or the claim as construed;
4. Viewed without any knowledge of the alleged invention as claimed, do those differences constitute steps which would have been obvious to the person skilled in the art or do they require any degree of invention?

In fields where advances are typically obtained by experimentation, an "obvious to try" test may be taken into consideration in the fourth step of the obviousness inquiry. The Supreme Court stated that if an "obvious to try" test is warranted, the following non-exclusive factors may be relevant:

1. Is it more or less self-evident that what is being tried ought to work? Are there a finite number of identified predictable solutions known to persons skilled in the art?
2. What is the extent, nature and amount of effort required to achieve the invention? Are routine trials carried out or is the experimentation prolonged and arduous, such that the trials would not be considered routine?
3. Is there a motive provided in the prior art to find the solution the patent addresses?

The subject case turned on the "obvious to try" test. The Supreme Court found that the advantage of the selection patent was not quickly or easily predictable, and therefore the person skilled in the art would not have found it self-evident to try to find the claimed invention.

=== Double patenting ===
Apotex claimed that selection patents allow a patent holder to "evergreen" an invention. The Supreme Court rejected this argument for two reasons. First, a selection patent may be obtained by someone other than the inventor of the genus patent. Second, selection patents encourage improvement by selection.

The Supreme Court concluded that there was no "same invention double patenting" because the claims of the genus patent and the subject selection patent are not identical or coterminous. Furthermore, there was no "obviousness double patenting" because the claims in the selection patent reflected a patentably distinct compound from the compounds in the genus patent. In view of the above, there was no double patenting.

== See also ==
- Novelty and non-obviousness in Canadian patent law
- List of Supreme Court of Canada cases (McLachlin Court)
