= Free World Trust v Électro Santé Inc =

- Supreme Court of Canada

Hearing: December 14, 1999 Judgment: December 15, 2000
- Citations: [2000] 2 S.C.R. 1024, 2000 SCC 66
- Docket No.: 26406
- Ruling: Appeal dismissed.

Court membership
- Chief Justice: Antonio Lamer; Puisne Justices: Claire L'Heureux-Dubé, Charles Gonthier, Beverley McLachlin, Frank Iacobucci, John C. Major, Michel Bastarache, Ian Binnie, Louise Arbour

Reasons given
- Unanimous reasons by: Binnie J.
- Lamer C.J. and Arbour J. took no part in the consideration or decision of the case.

Free World Trust v Électro Santé Inc, [2000] 2 S.C.R. 1024, 2000 SCC 66, is a leading Supreme Court of Canada decision on patents, namely claim construction and the necessity to identify essential elements and non-essential elements. Along with the related decision, Camco v. Whirlpool (2001), 9 C.P.R. (4th) 129 (SCC), the Supreme Court of Canada rejected the doctrine of equivalents applied in the United States and adopted the doctrine of purposive construction, as originally applied by the United Kingdom House of Lords in Catnic v. Hill & Smith. This was a landmark decision as it resolved the uncertainty in Canadian case law between the two doctrines.

The Court also articulated the scope of protection provided by patents and the requirements for infringement.

== Background ==
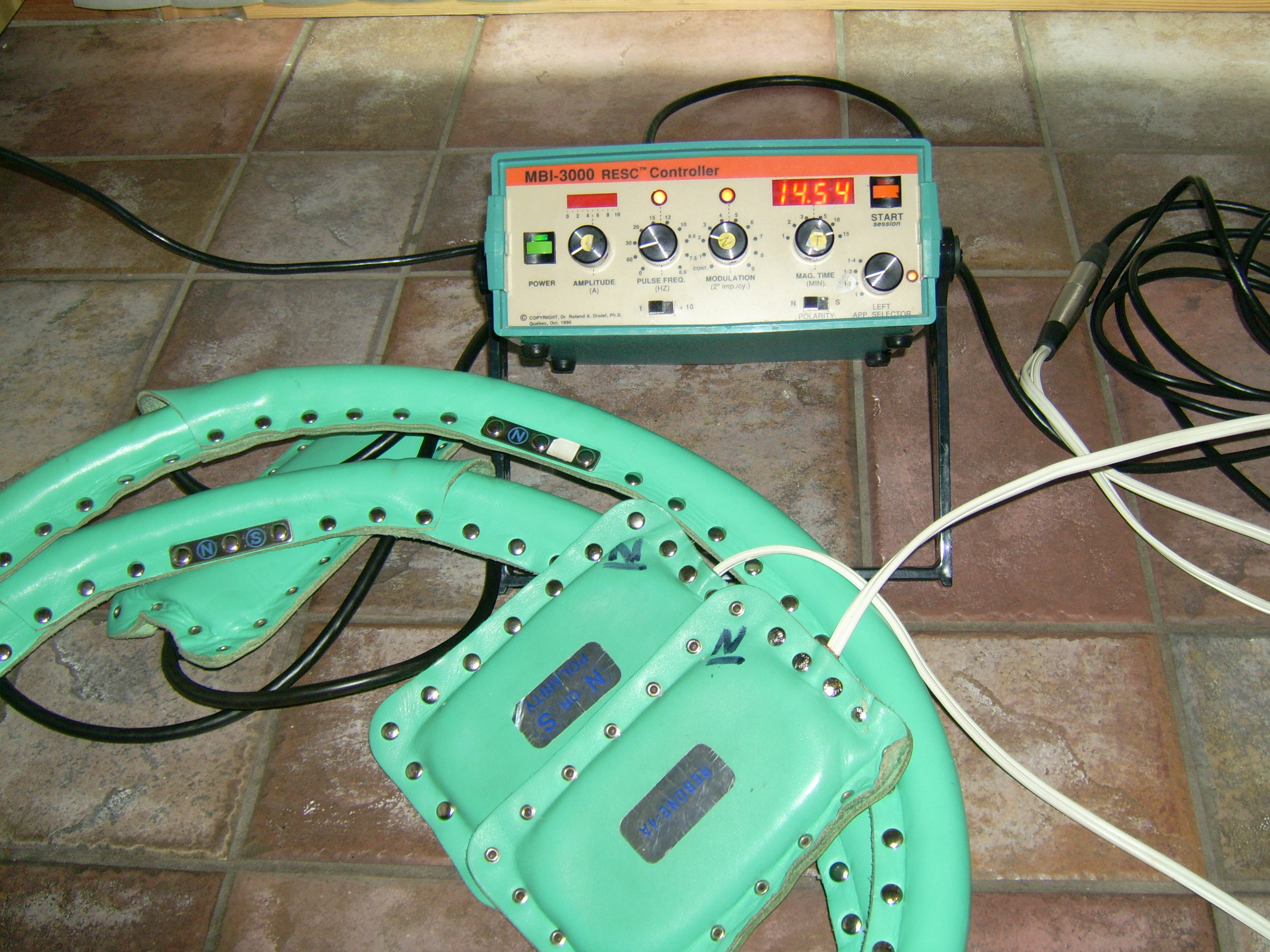
Dr. Drolet's 1990 Copyrighted (Rhumart System), "MBI-3000 RESC Controller", model# 7802.

Electro-magnetic therapeutic system is the English title of Canadian Patent 1,113,156 which was issued in 1981. The inventors Dr. Roland A. Drolet and Gaetan Charland, both from Canada, claimed that the device was an "electro-magnetic device for treating various types of rheumatic and arthritic diseases." The invention related to a technique of bombarding human bodies with low-frequency electromagnetic waves and controlled the wave frequency using "circuit means".

On November 24, 1981, Dr. Drolet and Mr. Charland received patent approval for their electro-magnetic therapeutic system. Their drawings, as portrayed within the Canadian patent, labeled the device "Ri - 2000 MAGNETOTHERAPY SYSTEM". By 1983, Dr. Drolet and Mr. Charland were issued another patent titled "ELECTRO-MAGNETIC THERAPEUTIC SYSTEM AND METHOD" which described the "Ri - 2000" in much further details and labeled the device as "Ri -2000 RHUMART-THERAPY SYSTEM". This second patent maintained many similar characteristics to the 1981 patent. In fact both patents drew and labeled their devices with "RODROL INSTRUMENTATION INC.".

Free World Trust was the rightful owner of the patents of invention numbered 1,113,156 (the "'156 patent") and 1,150,361 (the "'361 patent") issued in 1981 and 1983 respectively. On December 15, 2000, in the case of Free World Trust v. Électro Santé Inc., a decision was rendered by the Supreme Court of Canada on the infringement of patents 156 and 361. The decision would create a legal precedent cited in at least 148 Canadian trials. The case was even noted in Canada for setting out "the test for patent infringement" and "the principles of purposive claim construction". The court transcripts explain that Électro Santé Inc., a competitor, developed similar technology that used a microcontroller rather than the circuits. Free World Trust sued Électro Santé for patent infringement on the ground that although the means may be different the result of the inventions were the same.

The Quebec Superior Court found that Électro Santé's invention was not novel and so their invention was invalidated. The Court of Appeal overturned the decision and found that there was no violation. In a unanimous decision, the Supreme Court upheld the appellate court ruling.

== Opinion of the court ==
Justice Binnie wrote the decision for a unanimous Court. He began by describing the process of interpreting a patent through "claim construction". Claim construction is the process where the inessential part of the patent are distinguished from its essential elements which are protectable by patent. In this case, the essential elements of the two patents held by Free World included controls that regulated the electro-magnetic waves "by circuit means". This invention, Binnie found, was more than a mere aggregation of known components and was not anticipated by publications.

The primary issue to Binnie was how to resolve the conflict between "literal" and "substantive" infringement. He states that one of the purposes of the Patent Act is to achieve fairness and predictability in order to promote research and development. He was concerned that protection provided by a broad reading of a patent would scare innovators from exploring similar ideas surrounding a claimed patent. According to Binnie, predictability could be achieved by "tying the patentee to its claims" and fairness would be achieved by "interpreting those claims in an informed and purposive way".

Binnie was hesitant for courts to attempt to find the "spirit of the invention" which would create more uncertainty and unpredictability. His proposed "purposive construction" approach would avoid literal interpretation while limiting the scope of substantive claims in attempt to balance fairness between the patentee and the public. Purposive construction identifies the essential from the non-essential. The analysis is from the perspective of a "worker skilled in the art to which the patent relates as of the date the patent is published". If an essential element is different or missing from the challenged invention then there is no infringement. However, there may still be infringement where only non-essential elements are different or missing. A non-essential element is one that, from the words of the claim, are not clearly intended to be essential, or where a skilled reader would have been able to identify a substitute.

In applying these principles to the facts of the case, Binnie found that Electro Sante's invention did not infringe upon Free World's patent. The essential elements of these inventions are not the results they produce but the way of producing them. The patent holder cannot monopolize all means of producing a particular result. The use of a microcontroller was significantly different that it constituted a different invention.

== See also ==
Law

Case law
- List of Supreme Court of Canada cases (McLachlin Court)

Patent

General
- Magnetic fields
- Electromagnetic radiation
- Electromagnetic induction
- Eddy current
Electromagnetic
- Electromagnetic Therapy
- Transcranial magnetic stimulation (TMS)
Electroconvulsive
- Electroconvulsive therapy
- Deep brain stimulation
The device
- Rhumart
