= Canadian patent law =

Legal system regulating patents in Canada

Canadian patent law is the legal system regulating the granting of patents for inventions within Canada, and the enforcement of these rights in Canada.

A patent is a government grant that gives the inventor—as well as their heirs, executors, and assignees—the exclusive right within Canada to make, use, and/or sell the claimed invention during the term of the patent, subject to adjudication.

In general, Canadian patent law is administered by the Canadian Intellectual Property Office. The granting of Canadian patents is within the exclusive jurisdiction of the Canadian federal government and is governed by the federal Patent Act, the Patent Rules, and various international treaties and the regulations thereunder. The enforcement of Canadian patents is the responsibility of the Canadian Federal Court and the provincial/territorial Courts.

== Definition of a patentable invention ==
Patents apply to inventions. To be considered patentable, an invention must pass three criteria:

- novelty — the invention must be new, i.e., "first in the world".
- non-obviousness — it must be inventive, "showing ingenuity and not obvious to someone of average skill who works in the field of that invention".
- utility — the invention must be useful, i.e., functional and operative.

=== Novelty ===
To be patentable, an invention must be novel. That is, the invention must not have been described or claimed in a previously filed third-party Canadian patent application, and must not have been previously publicly disclosed by a third party, anywhere in the world. The test for novelty is whether or not a single, publicly disclosed example of prior art "contained all of the information which, for practical purposes, is needed to produce the claimed invention without the exercise of any inventive skill". If a third party previously filed a Canadian patent application disclosing the invention, or if a third party document or device previously publicly disclosed the invention anywhere in the world, then a subsequently applied-for Canadian patent application for that invention is lacking in novelty and is invalid. A lack of novelty is often referred to as "anticipation". For example, if a piece of prior art has each of the elements of a claimed invention, the piece of prior art is said to "anticipate" the claimed invention, or alternatively, the claimed invention is said to have been "anticipated by" the piece of prior art.

In Canada, the requirements for novelty are codified under s. 28.2 of the Patent Act:

28.2 (1) The subject-matter defined by a claim in an application for a patent in Canada (the "pending application") must not have been disclosed

(a) more than one year before the filing date by the applicant, or by a person who obtained knowledge, directly or indirectly, from the applicant, in such a manner that the subject-matter became available to the public in Canada or elsewhere;
(b) before the claim date by a person not mentioned in paragraph (a) in such a manner that the subject-matter became available to the public in Canada or elsewhere;
(c) in an application for a patent that is filed in Canada by a person other than the applicant, and has a filing date that is before the claim date;

...

The section does not restrict disclosure to prior patents, giving a broad description of what includes prior disclosure; so long as the subject-matter was disclosed "in such manner that the subject-matter became available to the public", the subject-matter is barred from being patented. This may include prior patents, publications or the invention itself being put on display. Disclosures in a private document, such as an internal memo that is not available to the public, do not count.

There is an eight-pronged test to determine whether anticipation occurs in Canada. The prior art must:

1. give an exact prior description;
2. give directions which will inevitably result in something within the claims;
3. give clear and unmistakable directions;
4. give information which for the purpose of practical utility is equal to that given by the subject patent;
5. convey information so that a person grappling with the same problem must be able to say "that gives me what I wish";
6. give information to a person of ordinary knowledge so that he must at once perceive the invention;
7. in the absence of explicit directions, teach an "inevitable result" which "can only be proved by experiments"; and
8. satisfy all these tests in a single document without making a mosaic.

=== Non-obviousness ===
The test for non-obviousness (also sometimes referred to as "inventive ingenuity" or "inventive step") is whether an "unimaginative skilled technician, in light of their general knowledge and the literature and information on the subject available to them on (the date that the application is filed in Canada), would have been led directly and without difficulty to [the] invention."

The requirement for non-obviousness is codified under s. 28.3 of the Patent Act.

28.3 The subject-matter defined by a claim in an application for a patent in Canada must be subject-matter that would not have been obvious on the claim date to a person skilled in the art or science to which it pertains, having regard to

(a) information disclosed more than one year before the filing date by the applicant, or by a person who obtained knowledge, directly or indirectly, from the applicant in such a manner that the information became available to the public in Canada or elsewhere; and
(b) information disclosed before the claim date by a person not mentioned in paragraph (a) in such a manner that the information became available to the public in Canada or elsewhere.

In Apotex Inc. v. Sanofi‑Synthelabo Canada Inc., the Supreme Court of Canada affirmed the test for non-obviousness laid out in the 1985 English case of Windsurfing International Inc. v. Tabur Marine (Great Britain) Ltd.:

1. Identify the notional "person skilled in the art" and the relevant common general knowledge of that person;
2. Identify the inventive concept of the claim in question or if that cannot readily be done, construe it;
3. Identify what, if any, differences exist between the matter cited as forming part of the "state of the art" and the inventive concept of the claim or the claim as construed;
4. Viewed without any knowledge of the alleged invention as claimed, do those differences constitute steps which would have been obvious to the person skilled in the art or do they require any degree of invention?

=== Utility ===
For a product to have utility it must perform some useful function. The requirement for utility originates from the definition of invention as a "new and useful art" The requirement is generally easy to meet, however, it does limit the scope of protection by excluding methods that would not be useful.

=== Subject matter ===
In addition to the three criteria above, in order to be patentable the invention must also be:

- a product (e.g., a door lock)
- a composition (e.g., a chemical composition used in lubricants for door locks)
- a machine (e.g., a machine for making door locks)
- a process (e.g., a method for making door locks)
- an improvement on any of the above

As such, there are number of matters that cannot be patented. Among such matters include certain new plant matters, and medical treatments within the body (diagnoses based on, for example, blood tests, are patentable). Some types of computer programs are also not patentable by law, as computer code by itself is not something physical. However, according to the Canadian Intellectual Property Office, a computer program may be patentable if it offers a new and inventive solution to a problem by modifying how the computer works.

Some things that cannot be patented include:

- "disembodied ideas, concepts or discoveries"
- "scientific principles and abstract theorems"
- "methods of medical treatment or surgery"
- "higher life forms"
- "forms of energy"
- "features of solely intellectual or aesthetic significance"
- "printed matter"

The list of prohibited matters notably differs from the United States. With respect to patents for software, while mere algorithms are not patentable per se (mere algorithms may be protected by Canadian copyright law), software may be protected by Canadian patent law if it meets the traditional criteria for patentability (that is, it must be new, non-obvious and useful). In other words, if for example the software is new and non-obvious, it would be patentable in Canada if the software directly provided a functional real world useful result (and not merely the calculation of a mere algorithm).

== Filing a patent ==
For patent applications filed in Canada prior to 1 October 1989, a patent would expire 17 years after it was issued. For those filed on or after 1 October 1989, a patent would last to a maximum of 20 years after the patent application was filed.

In Canada, all patent applications (unless they are withdrawn by the applicant) are made public 18 months from the earlier of: the filing date in Canada (or priority date), or the filing date in another country if one requests it and satisfies certain conditions. The goal of public access is to give the public the ability to learn new technological information while protecting the right of the inventor to profit from the invention.

=== First-to-file system ===
In Canada, since 1 October 1989, generally speaking, patents are granted to the first inventor to file an application for an invention (that is, Canada has a "first-to-file" system), which may result in a "race to the patent office" by inventors of competing technologies.

In some cases, an application may effectively receive an earlier filing date, to improve the chances of an applicant winning the "race to the patent office".

=== One year grace period ===
In Canada, inventors have one year (i.e., a "grace period") after their first public disclosure of their invention in which to file a Canadian patent application. However, disclosing the invention to the public prior to filing a Canadian patent application will result in the loss of significant international patent rights. Additionally, as Canada has a modified "first to file" system, any delay in the filing of a Canadian patent application may result in "losing the race to the patent office".

=== Requesting an earlier filing date ===
To facilitate the international protection of inventions, by way of international treaties and the application of Canadian law, in some circumstances, priority may be requested in a subsequently filed patent application to an earlier filed foreign or domestic patent application by the same inventor for the same invention to provide an earlier "effective filing date" for the subsequently filed application.

For example, if a subsequently filed patent application is filed in Canada within 12 months of the earliest date on which any corresponding previously regularly filed application was filed in Canada, or in any country belonging to the Paris Convention, or in any World Trade Organization (WTO) member country, the subsequently filed patent application can request priority back to the date of filing the earlier filed foreign or domestic patent application, effectively, for the purposes of determining patentability of the invention in the subsequently filed patent application, giving the subsequently filed patent application the filing date of the earlier filed foreign or domestic patent application to the extent that the claimed subject matter of the subsequently filed patent application overlaps with the disclosed subject matter of the earlier filed foreign or domestic patent application.

== Patent infringement ==
Once an invention is patented in Canada, exclusive rights are granted to the patent holder as defined by section 42 of the Patent Act. Any interference with the patent holder's "full enjoyment of the monopoly granted by the patent" is considered a patent infringement. Making, constructing, using, or selling a patented invention without the patent holder's permission can constitute infringement. Possession of a patented object, use of a patented object in a process, and inducement or procurement of an infringement may also, in some cases, count as infringement.

== The Patent Cooperation Treaty ==
As of 26 June 1970, Canada has been bound by the provisions of the Patent Cooperation Treaty (PCT). Pursuant to the PCT, the Canadian Patent Office may receive an international patent application as a "Receiving Office" if the applicant is a national or resident of Canada (or if there is more than one applicant, at least one of the applicants is a national or resident of Canada). Additionally, the Canadian Patent Office acts as an International Searching Authority and as the International Preliminary Examining Authority. Where an international patent application has been filed in which Canada has been designated and elected, the Canadian Patent Office is the elected Office pursuant to the PCT. Additionally, the Canadian Patent Office receives Canadian National Phase patent applications in accordance with the provisions of the PCT and Canadian legislation, and the rules thereunder.

== See also ==
- Intellectual property law in Canada
- Canadian Intellectual Property Office (CIPO)
- World Intellectual Property Organization (WIPO)
