= Novelty and non-obviousness in Canadian patent law =

For a patent to be valid in Canada, the invention claimed therein needs to be new and inventive. In patent law, these requirements are known as novelty and non-obviousness. A patent cannot in theory be granted for an invention without meeting these basic requirements or at least, if a patent which does not meet these requirements is granted, it cannot later be maintained. These requirements are borne out of a combination of statute and case law.

== Novelty ==
The definition of “invention” in section 2 of the Patent Act (R.S.C., 1985, c. P-4) uses the word “new”. This means the invention must not already be known. Section 28.2(1) of the Patent Act explicitly codifies the novelty requirement.

28.2 (1) The subject-matter defined by a claim in an application for a patent in Canada (the “pending application”) must not have been disclosed

(a) more than one year before the filing date by the applicant, or by a person who obtained knowledge, directly or indirectly, from the applicant, in such a manner that the subject-matter became available to the public in Canada or elsewhere;
(b) before the claim date by a person not mentioned in paragraph (a) in such a manner that the subject-matter became available to the public in Canada or elsewhere;
(c) in an application for a patent that is filed in Canada by a person other than the applicant, and has a filing date that is before the claim date;
...

Section 28.2 thus blocks patent applications if the applicant, or someone who obtained their knowledge from the applicant, made the invention public more than a year before applying; if anyone else made the invention public before the application; or if the invention is already subject to an earlier patent application.

=== Disclosure by the applicant ===
Paragraph 28.2(1)(a) provides a grace period that allows claims to "subject matter" in a patent (application) in Canada up until twelve months after its public disclosure by the applicant or somebody who obtained knowledge about it from the applicant. It can also allow inventors to discuss their invention with potential investors, for instance, without requiring non-disclosure agreements. However, since such a grace period is non-universal, it remains limited in its helpfulness to inventors.

=== Disclosure by another party ===
The section also provides that the subject-matter defined in the claim cannot have been previously disclosed in Canada or elsewhere. If the subject-matter has been disclosed in Canada or in a foreign jurisdiction, a patent cannot be granted on the same subject-matter in Canada.

The section does not restrict disclosure to prior patents. As long as the subject-matter was disclosed “in such manner that the subject-matter became available to the public”, the subject-matter is barred from being patented. This includes prior patents, publications, or the invention itself being put on display. Disclosures in a private document, such as an internal memo that is not available to the public, do not count. Ignorance regarding prior disclosure is not an excuse.

Where there has been prior disclosure of the same subject-matter, the invention will be deemed to be not novel, the prior disclosure being anticipatory of the invention. However, the prior disclosure must be sufficiently detailed to be anticipatory. The disclosure must also be self-contained; a combination of prior art is not adequate for showing anticipation.

In Reeves Brothers Inc. v. Toronto Quilting & Embroidery Ltd., Justice Gibson the Federal Court enunciated an eight-pronged test for determining whether prior art is anticipatory of the subject-matter of a patent. The prior art must:

1. give an exact prior description;
2. give directions which will inevitably result in something within the claims;
3. give clear and unmistakable directions;
4. give information which for the purpose of practical utility is equal to that given by the subject patent;
5. convey information so that a person grappling with the same problem must be able to say "that gives me what I wish";
6. give information to a person of ordinary knowledge so that he must at once perceive the invention;
7. in the absence of explicit directions, teach an "inevitable result" which "can only be proved by experiments"; and
8. satisfy all these tests in a single document without making a mosaic.

The final statement is credited with creating a misinterpretation that the tests are cumulative. However, the tests are not cumulative. The Court of Appeal has commented that "Gibson J. had only enumerated various formulations for the test of anticipation retained in earlier decisions and his conclusion really is that there could be no finding of anticipation unless one met any, rather that each of these eight 'tests'.

In Beloit Canada Ltd. et al v. Valmet Oy, one of the leading cases on anticipation by publication, the Federal Court of Appeal stated:

One must, in effect, be able to look at a prior, single publication and find in it all the information which, for practical purposes, is needed to produce the claimed invention without the exercise of any inventive skill. The prior publication must contain so clear a direction that a skilled person reading and following it would in every case and without possibility of error be led to the claimed invention.

In Baker Petrolite Corp. v. Canwell Enviro-Industries Ltd., the Federal Court of Appeal listed the following eight principles for anticipation by prior use or sale, which supplement the principles from Beloit Canada Ltd. et al v. Valmet Oy:

1. Sale to the public or use by the public alone is insufficient to prove anticipation. Disclosure of the invention is required to constitute anticipation under section 28.2(1)(a) of the Patent Act.
2. For a prior sale or use to anticipate an invention, it must amount to “enabling disclosure”.
3. The prior sale or use of a chemical product will constitute enabling disclosure to the public if its composition can be discovered through analysis of the product.
4. The analysis must be able to be performed by a person skilled in the art in accordance with known analytical techniques available at the relevant time and without the exercise of inventive skill.
5. When reverse engineering is capable of discovering the invention, it becomes available to the public if a product containing the invention is sold to any one member of the public who is free to use it as she or he pleases.
6. It is not necessary to demonstrate that a member of the public actually analyzed the product sold.
7. The amount of time and work involved in conducting the analysis is not determinative of whether a skilled person could discover the invention. The relevant consideration is only whether inventive skill is required.
8. It is not necessary that the product that is the subject of the analysis be capable of exact reproduction. It is the subject matter of the patent claims that must be disclosed through the analysis. Novelty of the claimed invention is destroyed if there is a disclosure of an embodiment which falls within the claim.

In Apotex Inc. v. Sanofi‑Synthelabo Canada Inc., it was claimed that Sanofi-Synthelabo’s patent was invalid because it covered only a selection of a prior, broader genus patent. One of the alleged grounds of invalidity was lack of novelty. The Supreme Court of Canada employed a two-part test for anticipation. In order for there to be a finding of anticipation, the prior art must satisfy both of the following branches:

1. prior disclosure; and
2. enablement.

The test for disclosure is whether a person skilled in the art, reading the prior patent, would understand that it discloses the special advantages of the second invention. No trial and error is permitted.

Once it is established that the prior disclosure indicates the special advantages of the second invention, some trial and error or experimentation is permitted to determine whether that disclosure also enables the development of the second invention. However, the skilled person must be able to perform or make the invention of the second patent without undue burden.

The Supreme Court based their test on an earlier British test: “Patents are meant to teach people how to do things. If what is “taught” involves just too much [work] to be reasonable allowing for all the circumstances including the nature of the art, then the patent cannot be regarded as an “enabling disclosure.” . . . The setting of a gigantic project, even if merely routine, will not do."

The prior art information must thus:

1. be clearly disclosed, and
2. enable the skilled worker to make or perform the invention.

The Supreme Court stated four non-exhaustive factors to be considered in determining whether there has been enablement:

1. Enablement is to be assessed having regard to the prior patent as a whole including the specification and the claims. There is no reason to limit what the skilled person may consider in the prior patent in order to discover how to perform or make the invention of the subsequent patent. The entire prior patent constitutes prior art.
2. The skilled person may use his or her common general knowledge to supplement information contained in the prior patent. Common general knowledge means knowledge generally known by persons skilled in the relevant art at the relevant time.
3. The prior patent must provide enough information to allow the subsequently claimed invention to be performed without undue burden. When considering whether there is undue burden, the nature of the invention must be taken into account. For example, if the invention takes place in a field of technology in which trials and experiments are generally carried out, the threshold for undue burden will tend to be higher than in circumstances in which less effort is normal. If inventive steps are required, the prior art will not be considered as enabling. However, routine trials are acceptable and would not be considered undue burden. But experiments or trials and errors are not to be prolonged even in fields of technology in which trials and experiments are generally carried out. No time limits on exercises of energy can be laid down; however, prolonged or arduous trial and error would not be considered routine.
4. Obvious errors or omissions in the prior patent will not prevent enablement if reasonable skill and knowledge in the art could readily correct the error or find what was omitted.

As an example of an application of this test: under the disclosure branch of the test, a compound is not clearly disclosed simply because it is part of a larger class of compounds; under the enablement branch, a compound is not enabled simply by disclosing its theoretical formula, unless the compound has actually been prepared or the skilled worker would know, from the given directions or his ordinary knowledge, how to prepare it.

=== Earlier patent application ===
Priority is determined by order of applications, thus a prior application will bar a subsequent one. This "first to file" approach is used globally. Although previously holding to its "first to invent" system, the United States, switched on March 16, 2013, after the enactment of the America Invents Act (see "First to file and first to invent"). An earlier application that remains secret because it is abandoned or withdrawn before being published does not constitute disclosure.

== Non-obviousness ==
A valid patent also requires a non-obvious invention. The invention must have some element of inventiveness. This concept originated in common law out of the notion that an invention must be inventive. It is now explicitly codified in section 28.3 of the Patent Act.

28.3 The subject-matter defined by a claim in an application for a patent in Canada must be subject-matter that would not have been obvious on the claim date to a person skilled in the art or science to which it pertains, having regard to

(a) information disclosed more than one year before the filing date by the applicant, or by a person who obtained knowledge, directly or indirectly, from the applicant in such a manner that the information became available to the public in Canada or elsewhere; and
(b) information disclosed before the claim date by a person not mentioned in paragraph (a) in such a manner that the information became available to the public in Canada or elsewhere.

Section 28.3 has a grace period of one year that allows the inventor, or a person who obtained knowledge directly or indirectly from the inventor, to disclose the invention without rendering the subsequent invention non-obvious.

The non-obvious requirement is explained in Beloit Canada Ltd. v. Valmet Oy. Justice Hugessen contrasted the concepts of anticipation and non-obviousness:

They are, of course, quite different; obviousness is an attack on a patent based on its lack of inventiveness. The attacker says, in effect, ‘Any fool could have done that’. Anticipation, or lack of novelty, on the other hand, in effect assumes that there has been an invention but asserts that it has been disclosed to the public prior to the application for the patent.

It should be clarified that while Justice Hugessen says “any fool”, the proper standard in patents is a person skilled in the art.

The man skilled in the art is the hypothetical person used as the benchmark for determining obviousness. The description of this man is:

the technician skilled in the art but having no scintilla of inventiveness or imagination; a paragon of deduction and dexterity, wholly devoid of intuition; a triumph of the left hemisphere over the right. The question to be asked is whether this mythical creature (the man in the Clapham omnibus of patent law) would, in the light of the state of the art and of common general knowledge as at the claimed date of invention, have come directly and without difficulty to the solution taught by the patent.

In Apotex Inc. v. Sanofi‑Synthelabo Canada Inc., Justice Rothstein adopted the approach from Windsurfing International Inc. v. Tabur Marine (Great Britain) Ltd.:

1. Identify the notional “person skilled in the art” and identify the relevant common general knowledge of that person;
2. Identify the inventive concept of the claim in question or if that cannot readily be done, construe it;
3. Identify what, if any, differences exist between the matter cited as forming part of the “state of the art” and the inventive concept of the claim or the claim as construed;
4. Viewed without any knowledge of the alleged invention as claimed, do those differences constitute steps which would have been obvious to the person skilled in the art or do they require any degree of invention?

Each of these steps is crucial, and can affect the outcome of the obviousness inquiry. Cases can turn on the interpretation of who the presumed skilled person is, since this will affect how large a step is big enough for the subsequent invention to be considered non-obvious.

A nuance to this test will be included for inventions in areas where advances are often won by experimentation; an “obvious to try” test can be used to extend obviousness and invalidate a patent. Commercial success of the invention sought to be patented also impacts a finding of obviousness.

=== Obvious-to-try ===
In fields where experimentation is common, such as in the pharmaceutical industry, an invention may be unpatentable if a skilled worker would have found it obvious to try the course that led to it. As stated by the Supreme Court of Canada in Apotex Inc. v. Sanofi‑Synthelabo Canada Inc., the following non-exclusive factors should be taken into consideration at the fourth step of the obviousness inquiry:

1. Is it more or less self-evident that what is being tried ought to work? Are there a finite number of identified predictable solutions known to persons skilled in the art?
2. What is the extent, nature and amount of effort required to achieve the invention? Are routine trials carried out or is the experimentation prolonged and arduous, such that the trials would not be considered routine?
3. Is there a motive provided in the prior art to find the solution the patent addresses?

If the answer to these questions leads to a finding that it was obvious to take this additional step, the patent will be considered obvious and invalid. The court makes clear that where the required experimentation to take the leap is extensive, a patent can be granted for the further step taken.

==== The American Approach to Obvious-to-Try: KSR International Co. v. Teleflex Inc. ====
The Supreme Court of the United States was confronted with the obvious to try issue in KSR International Co. v. Teleflex Inc., where the subject-matter of a patent was a combination of known components. They held that “when there is a design need or market pressure to solve a problem and there are a finite number of identified, predictable solutions, a person of ordinary skill in the art has good reason to pursue the known options within his or her technical grasp. If this leads to the anticipated success, it is likely that the result is not innovative enough to be patentable.”

This is similar to Canada in that an invention can still be deemed to be obvious, despite going a step beyond the prior art.

=== Commercial success ===
A patented item that is an instant hit on the market is less likely to be found obvious than a patent for a product that was poorly received. In Diversified Products Corp. v. Tye-Sil Corp. the Federal Court of Appeal stated that:

[w]hile the factor of commercial success, taken alone, is not conclusive evidence of inventiveness, where as here, it is but one of many factors, it cannot be disregarded.

The court listed other factors that may support a finding of non-obviousness:

Looking at these various factors -- the device is novel and superior to what was available until then; it was since used widely and in preference to alternative devices; competitors as well as experts in the field had never thought of the combination; amazement accompanied its first publication; commercial success -- it is, using the words of Tomlin J., in De Frees, supra, ‘practically impossible to say that there is not present that scintilla of invention necessary to support the patent’.
