= Whirlpool Corp v Camco Inc =

- Supreme Court of Canada

Hearing: December 14, 1999 Judgment: December 15, 2000
- Citations: [2000] 2 S.C.R. 1067; 2000 SCC 67
- Docket No.: 27208
- Ruling: Appeal dismissed.

Court membership
- Chief Justice: Antonio Lamer; Puisne Justices: Claire L'Heureux-Dubé, Charles Gonthier, Beverley McLachlin, Frank Iacobucci, John C. Major, Michel Bastarache, Ian Binnie, Louise Arbour

Reasons given
- Unanimous reasons by: Binnie J.

Whirlpool Corp v Camco Inc, [2000] 2 S.C.R. 1067; 2000 SCC 67, is a leading Supreme Court of Canada decision on patent claim construction and double patenting. The court adopted purposive construction as the means to construe patent claims. This judgement is to be read along with the related decision, Free World Trust v Électro Santé Inc, [2000] 2 S.C.R. 1066, 2000 SCC 66, where the Court articulated the scope of protection provided by patents.

== Background ==
=== Law ===
The Canadian patent system prohibits double patenting, acquiring two patents for the same invention. In order to determine whether an inventor has secured a double patent, courts compare the claims of the patents, searching for identical or conterminous claims. This process is known as "same invention" double patenting. Another type of double patenting, known as "obviousness" double patenting is in no way explained other than "when the second, later set of claims are not patently distinct from the claims of the earlier patent."

=== Facts ===
In the 1970s, Whirlpool developed a dual-action washing machine agitator that utilized the bottom portion of the shaft for the usual oscillating motion but added an upper sleeve that was designed to work as an auger. The auger propelled water and clothing downwards toward the agitator's oscillating vanes so as to produce more uniform scrubbing. Whirlpool secured three Canadian patents for this work. In the first patent, the dual agitator was powered by a drive shaft. A second patent (known as the '803 patent) substituted a clutch mechanism for the drive shaft. Both patent specifications described the agitator's vanes as being rigid. Whirlpool's third patent, known as the '734 patent, featured flexible vanes on the lower agitator instead of rigid vanes.

== The courts below ==
At trial in the Federal Court, the trial judge found that the '734 patent was a valid patent, and that it had been infringed by Camco. Camco appealed this ruling to the Federal Court of Appeal, who dismissed the appeal. Camco then appealed to the Supreme Court of Canada.

== See also ==
- List of Supreme Court of Canada cases (McLachlin Court)
