= Canadian Intellectual Property Office =

Canadian government agency

- Office de la propriété intellectuelle du Canada
- Official bilingual (French and English) logo of the Canadian Intellectual Property Office

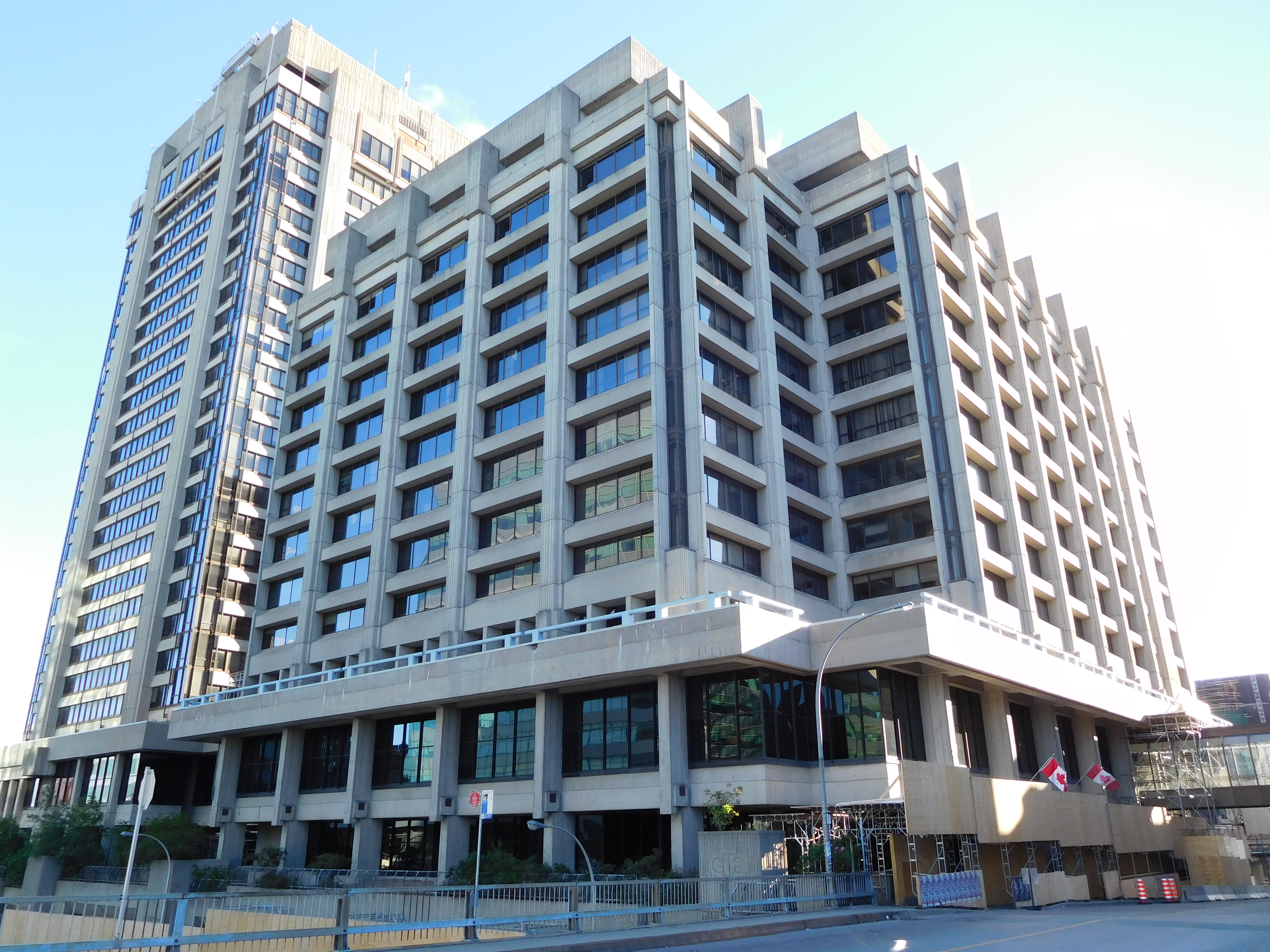
- Place du Portage Phase I building (left) where the Canadian Intellectual Property Office headquarters are located in Gatineau, Quebec

Agency overview
- Type: Special operating agency
- Jurisdiction: Government of Canada
- Headquarters: Gatineau, Quebec; 45.428499°N 75.712720°W
- Employees: 1,000 (as of 2019)
- Minister responsible: Melanie Joly, Minister of Industry
- Agency executive: Konstantinos Georgaras, Commissioner of Patents, Registrar of Trademarks and Chief Executive Officer of the Canadian Intellectual Property Office
- Parent department: Innovation, Science and Economic Development Canada
- Child agencies: Patent Branch; Trademarks and Industrial Design Branch; Corporate Strategies and Services; Business Services Branch; Programs Branch; Patent Appeal Board; Trademarks Opposition Board
- Website: www.ic.gc.ca/eic/site/cipointernet-internetopic.nsf/eng/home

The Canadian Intellectual Property Office (CIPO; French: Office de la propriété intellectuelle du Canada, OPIC) is responsible for the administration and processing of the greater part of intellectual property (IP) in Canada. CIPO's areas of activity include patents, trademarks, copyright, industrial designs and integrated circuit topographies. Structurally, CIPO functions as a special operating agency (SOA) under Innovation, Science and Economic Development Canada. CIPO is based in Gatineau, Quebec, part of the National Capital Region. CIPO’s Chief Executive Officer is Konstantinos Georgaras.

CIPO plays an integral role in the Canadian innovation ecosystem and cooperates with its counterpart organizations around the world through international IP treaties. Continued collaboration with international partners and domestic stakeholders strengths the Canadian IP regime and provides CIPO’s clients with opportunities to extract greater value from their creations and inventions.

In 2019, Canada ratified and fully implemented the Hague Agreement for industrial designs; the Madrid Protocol, the Singapore Treaty and the Nice Agreement for trademarks; and the Patent Law Treaty for patents. Prior to 2019, Canada had joined the TRIPS Agreement and the Paris Convention for intellectual property; the WIPO Convention for trademarks and copyright; the Berne Convention, the Rome Convention and the Marrakesh VIP Treaty for copyright; and the Budapest Treaty, the Patent Cooperation Treaty, the Strasbourg Agreement and the UPOV Convention for patents.

In 2020, CIPO received approximately 160,000 applications to register more than 37,000 patents, 76,000 trademarks, 12,500 copyrights and 8,000 industrial designs.

== Mandate ==
CIPO is responsible for processing applications to register patents, trademarks, copyrights and industrial designs. CIPO's mandate is to provide this service and, more generally, to provide education on intellectual property to Canadians. By modernizing the national IP system and collaborating with its international counterparts, CIPO helps innovators and entrepreneurs grow their business in global markets and attract foreign investments to Canada.

== Trademarks ==
A trademark can protect a combination of words, sounds or designs used to distinguish your goods or services from those of others in the marketplace. CIPO administers the Trademarks Act, Trademarks Regulations, the Olympic and Paralympic Marks Act and the Olympic and Paralympic Marks Regulations. In particular, the Trademarks and Industrial Design Branch is responsible for processing filings, conducting examinations and approving or refusing applications. If a trademark application is refused, there is a right of appeal to the Federal Court of Canada. If a trademark application is approved, the Trademarks and Industrial Design Branch is also responsible for advertising it in the Trademarks Journal and, ultimately, processing the registration and renewal of the trademark. However, if an opposition is filed during the advertisement stage, the application is referred to the Trademarks Opposition Board (another body within CIPO) for adjudication.

== Patents ==
A patent is an exclusive right granted for an invention, such as a product or a process. CIPO administers the Patent Act and Patent Rules. More specifically, the Patent Branch is responsible for processing filings, conducting examinations and approving or refusing applications. If a patent application is refused, there is a right of appeal to the Commissioner of Patents. This review is conducted by an administrative body within CIPO, the Patent Appeal Board.

== Copyright ==
Copyright provides protection for literary, artistic, dramatic and musical creations. CIPO administers the Copyright Act and Copyright Regulations. CIPO is responsible for processing copyright applications, assignments and licences.

== Industrial designs ==
Industrial design registration provides protection for the original visual features of a product. CIPO administers the Industrial Design Act and the Industrial Design Regulations. CIPO is responsible for processing filings, conducting examinations and approving or refusing applications. If an industrial design application is considered for refusal, the decision can be reviewed by the Patent Appeal Board. If the application is ultimately refused, the decision can be appealed to the Federal Court of Canada.

== Integrated circuit topographies ==
Integrated circuit topographies refers to the three-dimensional configurations of electronic circuits embodied in integrated circuit products or layout designs. CIPO administers the Integrated Circuit Topography Act and the Integrated Circuit Topography Regulations. CIPO is responsible for processing integrated circuit topography applications, assignments and licences.
