= Patent Act (Canada) =

Canadian patent law

Parliament of Canada
- Long title: An Act respecting patents of invention
- Citation: R.S.C., 1985, c. P-4
- Enacted: 1869
- Status: Current legislation

The Patent Act (French: Loi sur les brevets) is Canadian federal legislation and is one of the main pieces of Canadian legislation governing patent law in Canada. It sets out the criteria for patentability, what can and cannot be patented in Canada, the process for obtaining a Canadian patent, and provides for the enforcement of Canadian patent rights.

== Purpose ==
The purpose of a patent is to protect inventions. Patents provide the owner of a patent with the exclusive right to make, use and sell a patented invention.

These restrictions form a system of encouraging economic and technical growth. The patent is a contract between the inventor and the government who represents society. The inventor obtains a monopoly limited to a 20-year term of producing and selling the patent. Society gains disclosure of the invention and free use of it after the patent expires.

== History ==
The first patent in Canada was granted by the legislature of Quebec in 1791. No official patent act followed until about 30 years later when Upper and Lower Canada enacted patent acts in the 1820s. The provinces of Canada held responsibility for patents within their boundaries

The British North America Act established that patents were a federal responsibility. The first federal Patent Act was created in 1869. This act granted patents for a term of 15 years, divided into three five-year periods.

The second federal Patent Act was passed in 1872 and allowed foreigners to register patents.

In the 1880s and 1890s the Patent Act was amended to extend patent terms from 15 to 18 years, divided into three six-year periods.

The Patent Office and post of Commissionaire of Patents are established by statute between 1900 and 1919.

In 1923, the third federal Patent Act provided provisions for inventions created by public servants.

The fourth federal Patent Act was passed in 1935, this act had provisions for the procedure of obtaining patents on inventions related to national defence and atomic energy.

The Patent Office and position of Commissionaire of Patents were incorporated into the new Canadian Intellectual Property Office in 1991.

In 1993, the requirement that an invention be not obvious was added to the Patent Act.

In 1996, the TRIPS implementation act was passed.

Patents are extended from 18 to 20 years as a result of a WTO ruling that 18-year patents violate TRIPS requirements in 2001.

== Applicable subject matter ==
Patents apply to physical inventions and process, but not literary works, most software and other forms of intellectual property. For more information see patentable subject matter in Canada.

== Patent enforcement ==
It is the responsibility of patent owners to enforce their patents. This is done by taking potential offenders to court to determine if the patent has been infringed and obtain compensation. Court action can be very expensive and can deter people from enforcing their patents. The cost of a patent infringement action in Canada can run from several hundred thousand dollars to several million dollars, depending on the complexity of the case.

== See also ==
- Bill C-9 - Jean Chrétien Pledge to Africa Act
- Pledge to Africa Act
