= United States patent law =

Right granted to the inventor

Under United States law, a patent is a right granted to the inventor of a (1) process, machine, article of manufacture, or composition of matter, (2) that is new, useful, and non-obvious. A patent is the right to exclude others, for a limited time (usually, 20 years) from unlawful profiting from a patented technology without the written consent of the patent holder or procedures established by law. Specifically, it is the right to exclude others from making, using, selling, offering for sale, importing, inducing others to infringe by applying for FDA approval, and/or offering a product specially adapted for practice of the patent.

== History ==
- 1623 – England adopts Statute of Monopolies, which has been acknowledged as a legal predecessor of the US patent law.
- 1789 – U.S. Constitution in Article I, Section 8, Clause 8 authorizes Congress "to promote the Progress of . . . useful Arts, by securing for limited Times to . . . Inventors the exclusive Right to their . . . Discoveries." It is believed that, unlike most parts of the US Constitution, which were derived from the British legal tradition, the IP clause was based on the French practice.
- 1790 – First Patent Act empowered the Secretary of State, the Secretary of War, and the Attorney General to examine patents for inventions deemed "sufficiently useful and important."
- 1793 – Second Patent Act eliminated examination of patent applications, emphasized enablement requirement. This Act did not have a requirement for claims, but it mandated a distinction "from...other things...and from other inventions" in the description:

description shall "distinguish the same from all other things before known," and in "the case of any machine" shall, explain the "principle... by which it may be distinguished from other inventions."

- 1836 – Third Patent Act re-introduced examination, recommended the use of patent claims. Subsequent case law developed rudimentary requirements for non-obviousness (Hotchkiss v. Greenwood), subject matter eligibility (Le Roy v. Tatham), written description (O'Reilly v. Morse) and the doctrine of equivalents (Winans v. Denmead).
- 1854 – In Winans v. Denmead, the US Supreme Court decided that the interpretation of patent claims is a question of law, decided by a judge, while the finding of infringement is a question of fact, decided by a jury. This remains a binding precedent.
- 1870 – Fourth Patent Act required the use of patent claims in nearly the exact language used today: "particularly point out and distinctly claim the part, improvement, or combination which he claims as his invention or discovery." The practice of dependent claims emerged afterwards.
- 1890 – The Sherman Antitrust Act introduced some remedies to limit abuses of patent monopoly. The SCOTUS under William O. Douglas developed case law on non-obviousness (see flash of genius) and subject matter eligibility to limit proliferation of weak patents.
- 1952 – Fifth Patent Act codified US patent law into Title 35 of the U.S. Code including previous case law on non-obviousness.
- 1980 – US Congress established an ex parte reexamination to allow the USPTO to review validity of issued patents at the request of patent owners and third parties. However, the process was slow and usually favored patent owners in result.
- 1982 – Establishment of U.S. Court of Appeals for the Federal Circuit, with exclusive jurisdiction over all patent appeals from the USPTO and federal district courts.
- 1984 – Hatch-Waxman Drug Price Competition and Patent Term Restoration Act encouraged generic pharmaceutical manufacturers to challenge the validity of wrongfully issued pharmaceutical patents.
- 1999 – US Congress established an inter partes reexamination to allow the USPTO to review validity of issued patents with participation of third party challengers. However, just like the ex parte reexamination introduced earlier, this process failed to gain popularity, in part due to being slow and to barring subsequent civil litigation.
- 2006 – In eBay v. MercExchange the SCOTUS ended the Federal Circuit's practice of liberally granting injunctions in cases of alleged patent infringement. Instead the same traditional four-factor test of equity used outside of patent law is mandated.
- 2007 – The SCOTUS created uncertainty in the non-obviousness determination by mixing it up with predictability in KSR v. Teleflex, thus overruling "a clear, bright-line test in § 103 obviousness inquiries such as teaching-suggestion-motivation". Nevertheless, many legal commentators praised the ruling as the need for raising the non-obviousness bar was widely recognized.
- 2008 – In Quanta v. LG Electronics the Supreme Court reversed the Federal Circuit's ruling and strengthened patent exhaustion doctrine.
- 2011 – Sixth Patent Act (America Invents Act) switched from first-to-invent to first-to-file.
- 2012–2013 – In Mayo and Myriad the SCOTUS limited patentability of inventions based on newly-discovered natural phenomena, requiring a further "inventive concept" instead of routine applications.
- 2014 – The US Supreme Court limited patentability of business methods, software patents, and other abstract ideas in Alice Corp. v. CLS Bank International albeit stopped short of banning such patents completely.
- 2014 – In a move widely regarded as directed against patent trolls, the SCOTUS's decision in Octane Fitness, LLC v. ICON Health & Fitness, Inc. made it easier to recover attorney's fees from plaintiffs, who initiate and lose in frivolous patent lawsuits.

== Legislation ==
The issues of patent validity and patent infringement fall under exclusive jurisdiction of the Federal government. On the other hand, questions of patent ownership (like other questions of private property) are contested in state courts, although federal courts can make decisions about patent ownership by applying the relevant state law, when appropriate.

Most of the US patent law is codified in Title 35 of the United States Code, as authorized by Article One, section 8, clause 8, which states:

The Congress shall have power ... To promote the progress of science and useful arts, by securing for limited times to authors and inventors the exclusive right to their respective writings and discoveries;

. The "patentability" of inventions (defining the types things that qualify for patent protection) is defined under Sections 100–105. Most notably, section 101 sets out "subject matter" that can be patented; section 102 defines "novelty" and "statutory bars" to patent protection; section 103 requires that an invention to be "non-obvious".

Although this statement is superficially similar to intellectual property clauses in the constitutions of other countries, the US patent system has several peculiarities:

- This clause is interpreted as giving the primary IP rights only to individuals (i.e. "inventors") rather than to organizations (see Stanford University v. Roche Molecular Systems, Inc.).
- Until 16 March 2013 the US gave priority to first inventors to invent, although the US adopted first inventor to file system since (see first to file and first to invent).
- The US has provisional patent applications, which can be filed one year before filing regular patent application, thus delaying the start on the nominal 20 year patent term by one year.
- Unlike most other countries, the US allows extension of patent monopoly beyond 20 years from the filing date via patent term adjustment due to the patent prosecution delays by the USPTO or due to product approval delays by Food and Drug Administration.
- The US does not have utility models.
- There is no criminal liability for patent infringement in the US, only civil liability.
- Although lawsuits for declaratory judgement are prohibited in the US in general, they are allowed in cases of potential patent infringement.
- A research exemption and fair use is allowed for using patented product or process for research and educational purposes, albeit their scopes have seen reductions in recent years.
- The large size of the US economy, the strong pro-patentee legal regime, and over 200 years of case law make US patents more valuable and more litigated than patents of any other country. The long history of patents and strong protection of patent holders contributes to abuse of the system by patent trolls, which are largely absent in other countries.

The US also has an extensive body of case law comprising federal court precedents that have accumulated over more than 200 years. US Federal District courts have primary jurisdiction in patent infringement cases. Patent validity can be challenged in the same US Federal District courts, as a declarative judgement or counter-claim of non-infringement. Alternatively, patent validity (or examiners' refusals to grant patents) can be challenged at Patent Trial and Appeal Board (PTAB). The US Court of Appeals for the Federal Circuit (CAFC) reviews the decisions of the Federal District Courts and of the PTAB. The rulings of the CAFC can be reviewed by the SCOTUS, but only on a discretionary basis (i.e. there is no right to appeal the CAFC's decisions).

=== Patentable subject matter (§101) ===
One author of the US Patent Act of 1952 stated that patentable subject matter should encompass "anything under the sun that is made by man." At that time, the USPTO and US courts interpreted both "anything" and "made by man" quite broadly. However, the meaning of these terms has been narrowed substantially over the years.

There are four types of "anything" (i.e. of statutory categories of inventions): a process, a machine (usually implies moving parts), (an article of) manufacture (usually implies no moving parts, e.g. textile fabric or a chair), a composition of matter (chemicals, materials), as well as improvements thereof. Not every object falls into a statutory category: for example, electromagnetic waves, and rules for playing games are not patentable (but a new and non-obvious type of dice for playing games may be patentable as a "manufacture"). The most significant restrictions occurred over time with respect to patentability of "processes" (methods). For example, patenting of business methods in US (in contrast to other countries) was quite common between c. 1990 and 2014, but courts gradually curtailed patentability of business methods to the point of almost complete exclusion in Alice Corp. v. CLS Bank International (2014).

Also, US courts have been struggling with the meaning of "made by man". Since at least 1948 in Funk Bros. Seed Co. v. Kalo Inoculant Co. the Supreme Court made clear, that trivial implementations of a newly discovered natural phenomenon or natural product are not eligible for a patent. However, in 1991 in Amgen v. Chugai Pharmaceutical the CAFC concluded that genes isolated from their natural environment were patentable. This practice came to an end in 2013 when the Supreme Court decided in Association for Molecular Pathology v. Myriad Genetics, Inc. (2013) that "mere isolation of genes does not qualify for patent protection". At the same time the Court allowed patenting of complementary DNA without introns, since "it does not exist" in nature. Similarly, inventions based on routine applications of discoveries (such as that different people metabolize the same drug at different rates as in Mayo Collaborative Services v. Prometheus Laboratories, Inc., or that pregnant woman's blood contains DNA of fetus' father as in Ariosa v. Sequenom) is not patent-ineligible in the US, since the new elements in such inventions are not "made" but rather "discovered" by man. Although the presence of such "discoveries" helps patentees to meet the non-obviousness requirement, an additional man-made contribution (called "inventive concepts" in Alice Corp. v. CLS Bank International) is required to limit this discovery to a patentable invention.

Patent subject matter eligibility is discussed in the details in section 2106 of Manual of Patent Examining Procedure. Additional examples can be found here.

=== Novelty (§102) ===
Section 102 of the patent act defines the "novelty" requirement. The novelty requirement prohibits patenting a technology that is already available to the public. Specifically, 35 U.S.C. 102 states:

(a) NOVELTY; PRIOR ART.—A person shall be entitled to a patent unless— (1) the claimed invention was patented, described in a printed publication, or in public use, on sale, or otherwise available to the public before the effective filing date of the claimed invention ...

For a technology to be "anticipated" (and therefore patent-ineligible) under 35 U.S.C. 102, the prior art reference must teach every aspect of the claimed invention either explicitly or impliedly. "A claim is anticipated only if each and every element as set forth in the claim is found, either expressly or inherently described, in a single prior art reference."

The issue of novelty often arises during patent examination because of inadvertent and/or partial disclosures by inventors themselves prior to filing a patent application. Unlike the laws of most countries, the US patent law provides for a one-year grace period in cases of inventor's own prior disclosure. Another unique feature of the US patent practice is a provisional patent application, which allows an inventor to establish a priority and gives them a year to improve on their invention before filing a complete (i.e. non-provisional) patent application.

=== Obviousness (§103) ===
To be patentable, a technology must not only be "new" but also "non-obvious." The US requirement for non-obviousness corresponds to the inventive step requirement in other countries. An "invention" is obvious (and therefore ineligible for a patent) if a person of "ordinary skill" in the relevant field of technology would have thought the technology was obvious, on the filing date of the patent application. Legislatively the requirement for non-obviousness was established in the Patent Act of 1952. Specifically, 35 U.S.C. 103 states:

35 U.S.C. 103 Conditions for patentability; non-obvious subject matter. A patent for a claimed invention may not be obtained, notwithstanding that the claimed invention is not identically disclosed as set forth in section 102, if the differences between the claimed invention and the prior art are such that the claimed invention as a whole would have been obvious before the effective filing date of the claimed invention to a person having ordinary skill in the art (PHOSITA) to which the claimed invention pertains.

The non-obviousness requirement does not demand that the prior art be identical to the claimed invention. It is enough that the prior art can somehow be modified (or combined) in order to teach the claimed technology. So long as the modification of the prior art (or combination of several prior art references) would have been obvious to a PHOSITA at the time the application was filed, the applied-for technology will be considered obvious and therefore patent-ineligible under 35 U.S.C. §103.

As the practice of the USPTO and US Federal Courts showed later, the PHOSITA criterion turned out to be too ambiguous in practice. The practical approach was developed later by the US Supreme Court in Graham v. John Deere Co. in 1966 and in KSR v. Teleflex in 2006.

== Application procedure ==
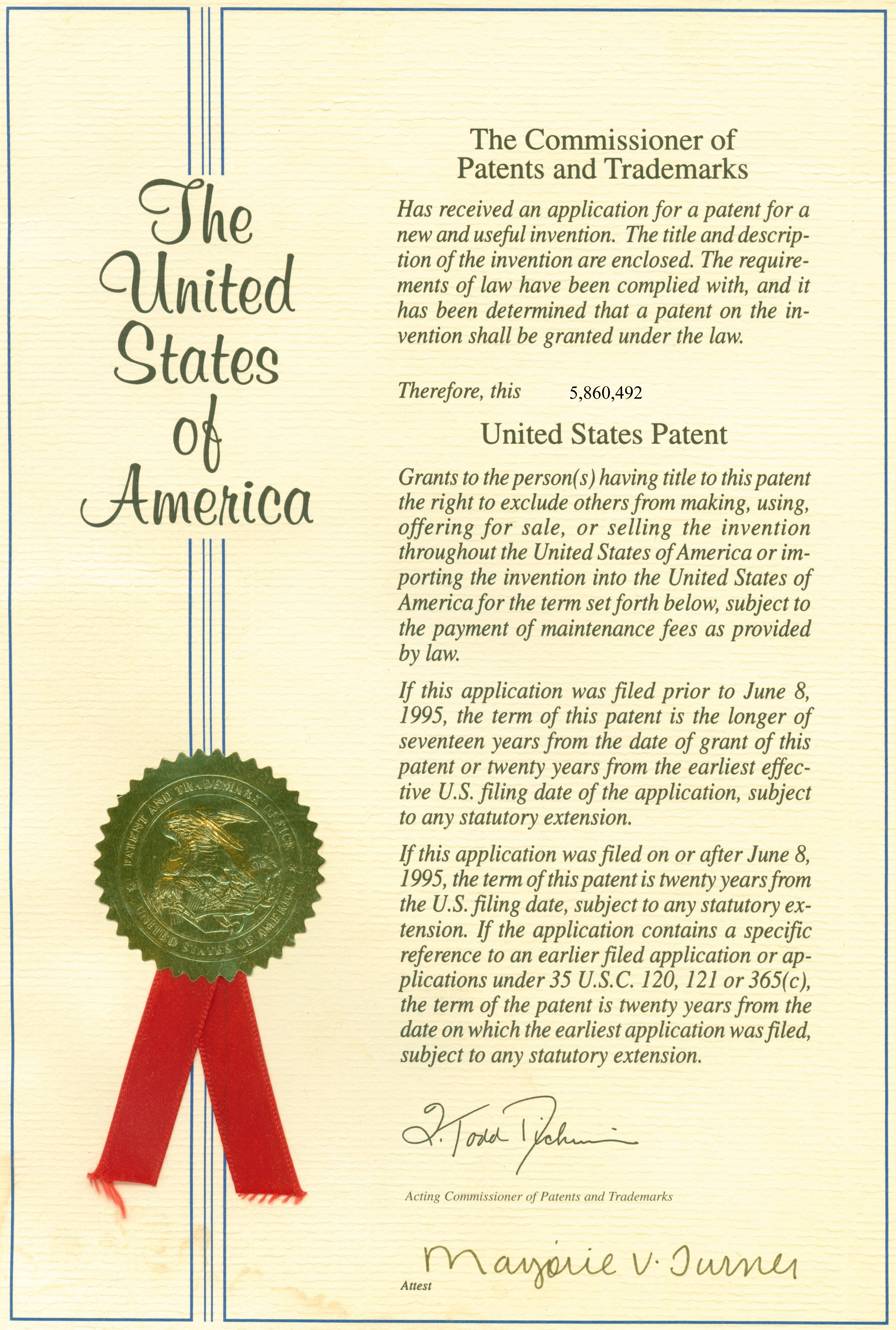
U.S. patent (1985-2018)

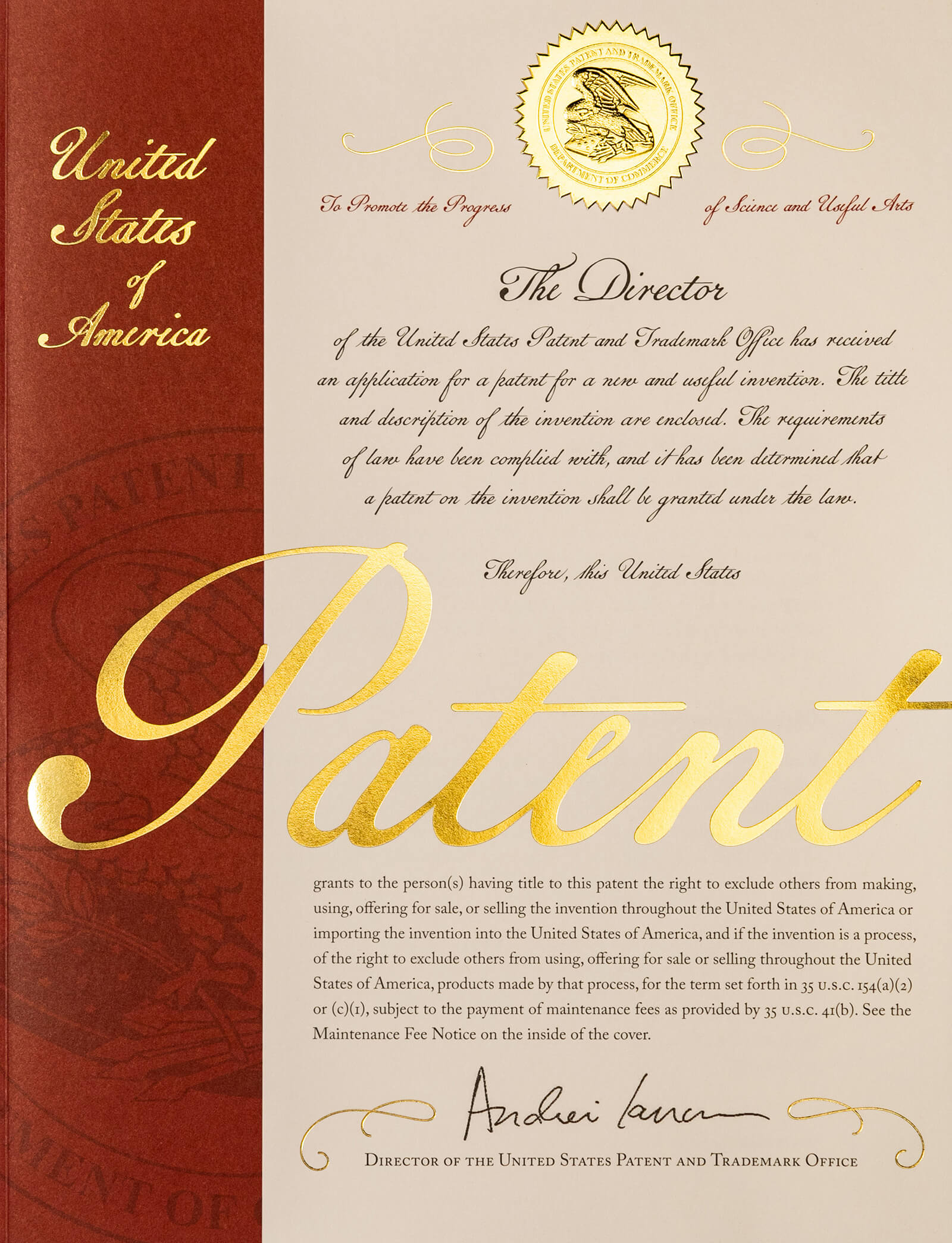
U.S. patent (2018-present)

Patent applications can be filed at the United States Patent and Trademark Office (USPTO). Prior to June 7, 1995, the duration of a US utility patent was 17 years from patent issuance. Since that date, the duration of the US utility patent is 20 years from the earliest effective filing date. However, patent term adjustment or extension are possible if the USPTO fails to issue a patent within 3 years after filing the full application, subject to various conditions on the applicant. The rules for drafting and filing a patent application are set out in the Manual of Patent Examining Procedure (MPEP).

=== Pre-grant publication (PG Pub) ===
Since the American Inventors Protection Act, the USPTO publishes patent applications 18 months after the earliest priority application (which often is a provisional application) is filed. This time limit can be extended under certain circumstances, for an additional fee. The applications may be published before a patent has been granted on them if the patent is not granted within the 18-month time frame. Applicants can opt out of publication if the applications will not be prosecuted internationally.

== Infringement and enforcement ==
Following the grant of a patent, possible post-grant proceedings include reissue, ex parte reexamination, inter partes reexamination, inter partes review, post-grant review, supplemental examination, and post-grant validity review of business method patents.

=== U.S. Federal District Courts (FDCs) ===
Litigation in the Federal District Courts remains the main remedy for patent infringement. 5000-6000 patent cases are filed each year in the United States. The two most popular districts for patent cases are E.D. Texas and D. Delaware.

=== U.S. International Trade Commission (ITC) ===
In cases involving importation of a patented product into the US, the patent holder may wish to pursue a cause of action in the United States International Trade Commission (ITC) instead of, or in addition to, the court system. The ITC is an agency of the U.S. federal government empowered to enforce patent holders' rights under Section 337 of the Tariff Act of 1930. In contrast to courts, which have a wide range of remedies at their disposal, including monetary damages, the ITC can grant only two forms of remedy: exclusion orders barring infringing products from being imported into the United States, and cease-and-desist orders preventing the defendants (known as respondents) in the ITC action from importing infringing products into the United States. In addition, the ITC can grant temporary relief, similar to a preliminary injunction in U.S. federal court, which prevents importation of allegedly infringing products for the duration of the ITC proceeding. In some cases, this may provide a quicker resolution to a patent owner's problems.

=== Court of Appeals for the Federal Circuit (CAFC) ===
The Court of Appeals for the Federal Circuit hears appeals from US Federal District Courts and from the International Trade Commission. The decisions of the CAFC can be appealed to the US Supreme Court, but only on discretionary basis via a petition for a writ of certiorari.

== Utilization and importance ==
A survey of 12 industries from 1981 to 1983 shows that patent utilization is strong across all industries in the United States, with 50 percent or more patentable inventions being patented.

However, this is not to say that all industries believe their inventions have relied on the patent system or believe it is a necessity to introduce and develop inventions. Another survey for the same time period show that, of those 12 same industries, only two—pharmaceuticals and chemicals—believe thirty percent or more of their patentable inventions would not have been introduced or developed without having patent protection. All others—petroleum, machinery, fabricated metal products, primary metals, electrical equipment, instruments, office equipment, motor vehicles, rubber, and textiles—have a percentage of twenty-five or lower, with the last four of those industries believing none of their inventions relied on the patent system to be introduced or developed.

Industry	Percent that would not have been introduced	Percent that would not have been developed
Pharmaceuticals	65	60
Chemicals	30	38
Petroleum	18	25
Machinery	15	17
Fabricated Metal Products	12	12
Primary Metals	8	1
Electrical Equipment	4	11
Instruments	1	1
Office Equipment	0	0
Motor Vehicles	0	0
Rubber	0	0
Textiles	0	0

== See also ==
- Timeline of United States inventions

=== Concepts ===
- All elements test
- Assignor estoppel
- Continuing patent application
- Design patent
- Doctrine of inherency
- Doctrine of repair and reconstruction
- Duty of candor
- Duty of disclosure
- Exhausted combination doctrine
- First-sale doctrine
- Flash of genius
- Incredible utility
- Inequitable conduct
- Information disclosure statement (IDS)
- Inter partes review
- Interference proceeding
- Large entity status
- Markman hearing
- Micro entity status
- Non-provisional patent application
- On-sale bar
- Petition to make special
- Printed matter (patent law)
- Prosecution disclaimer
- Prosecution history estoppel
- Provisional application
- Reduction to practice
- Reissue application
- Small entity status
- Statutory Invention Registration
- Submarine patent
- Transitional phrase
- United States Defensive Publication
- Utility (patentability requirement)
- X-Patent

=== Legislation ===
- 28 USC 1498. This statute allows the US government to override patent protection (or contract another entity to do so) for public-use purposes. The patent owner can sue for limited compensation.
- Invention Secrecy Act (1951)
- Patent Act of 1790, First Patent Act - April 7, 1790
- Patent Act of 1836
- Patent Act of 1870
- Patent Act of 1952
- Patent Reform Act of 2005
- Patent Reform Act of 2007
- Plant Patent Act (1930)

=== Other ===
- American Intellectual Property Law Association (AIPLA)
- Board of Patent Appeals and Interferences (BPAI)
- Confederate Patent Office
- Copyright law of the United States
- United States Court of Appeals for the Federal Circuit (CAFC)
- United States Court of Customs and Patent Appeals (CCPA)
- United States Patent and Trademark Office (USPTO)
- United States Patents Quarterly (USPQ)
- United States trademark law
- List of United States Supreme Court patent case law
