= Defensive publication =

A defensive publication, or defensive disclosure, is an intellectual property strategy used to prevent another party from obtaining a patent on a product, apparatus or method for instance. The strategy consists in disclosing an enabling description and/or drawing of the product, apparatus or method so that it enters the public domain and becomes prior art. Therefore, the defensive publication of perhaps otherwise patentable information may work to defeat the novelty of a subsequent patent application. Unintentional defensive publication by incidental disclosure can render intellectual property as prior art. One reason why companies decide to use defensive publication over patents is cost.

== See also ==
- Cloem, a defunct company creating computer-generated variants of patent claims, which may potentially be defensively published
- IBM Technical Disclosure Bulletin
- Trade secret
- United States Defensive Publication (existing between April 1968 and May 8, 1985)
- United States Statutory Invention Registration (existing until 2013)
