= WMR =

WMR may refer to:

== Media and music ==
- "WMR", a track by El-P and Camu Tao from the 2004 compilation album Def Jux Presents 3
- World Marxist Review, the English-language name of the 1958–1990 Communist journal Problems of Peace and Socialism
- World Mission Radio, a 1980s evening religious radio program broadcast by an unlicensed operator from a ship in the North Sea

== Railways ==
- Wellington and Manawatu Railway Company, a private rail transport company in New Zealand that operated from 1881 to 1908
- West Midlands Railway, part of West Midlands Trains, the current holder of the West Midlands franchise
- Widney Manor railway station, a station served by the UK National Rail association
- WMR No. 10, an 1891 2-6-2 tank locomotive

== Software ==
- Windows Mixed Reality, a mixed reality platform designed by Microsoft
- WMR e-Pin, LLC, a software development firm from whom DataTreasury acquired four check-imaging technology patents in February 2006

== Other ==
- .22 Winchester Magnum Rimfire, also called .22 WMR, .22 Magnum, or .22 Mag, a rimfire rifle cartridge
- Mananara Nord Airport, the International Air Transport Association (IATA) airport code for the airport in Mananara Nord, Toamasina Province, Madagascar
- Western Mindanao Region (WMR), one of six regions of the Christian And Missionary Alliance Churches of the Philippines (CAMACOP)
- WMR Biomedical, a company co-founded by American chemist George M. Whitesides
- Waikato Mounted Rifles, Royal New Zealand Armoured Corps squadron of the New Zealand Army
