= Micro entity =

Micro entity may refer to:

- A form of legal person in patent law, see Large and small entities in patent law
- Small and medium-sized enterprises#United Kingdom
