= Coalition for Patent Fairness =

The Coalition for Patent Fairness (CPF) is an ad hoc organization of companies who are lobbying for reforms to the US patent system. In general, they believe that the United States Patent and Trademark Office is too prone to grant overly broad patents. They feel that these overly broad patents and the level of damages that legitimate patent holders can obtain through courts is so high that it inhibits innovation. They were strongly in favor of the Patent Reform Act of 2007 and its successors the Patent Reform Act of 2009 and the America Invents Act.

== Principles ==
The CPF believes that the following principles should drive patent reform:

- "Damage awards should be based on common sense standards. In a world where a device can be made up of thousands of patented components, patent infringement damages should be proportionate to the value of the component in question rather than the entire product."
- "The standard for assessing "willful infringement" - which triggers a tripling of ordinary damages - must ensure "willful" damages are only assessed where there is truly egregious conduct and all parties' right to counsel is protected."
- "To encourage companies to keep their R&D programs in the U.S., patent laws governing how global damages are awarded should be revised so that foreign companies are not advantaged over U.S.-based companies."
- "The practice of "forum shopping" should end, ensuring patent lawsuits are resolved in courts that have a reasonable connection to the underlying claim."

== Membership ==
The membership of the Coalition for Patent Fairness includes:

- Amazon.com
- Autodesk
- Business Software Alliance
- Cisco Systems
- Comcast
- Dell
- Electrolux
- Financial Services Roundtable
- Google
- Hewlett-Packard
- Information Technology Industry Council
- Intel
- Micron Technology
- Palm
- SAP AG
- Symantec
- Time Warner
- Visa

== Officers ==
Jon Yarowsky, chief counsel.

== See also ==
- Coalition for 21st Century Patent Reform, which is opposed to various provision of the Patent Reform Act of 2007.
