= All elements test =

The all elements rule or all limitations rule (often written with a hyphen after "all") is a legal test used in US patent law to determine whether a given reference shows that a patent claim lacks the novelty required to be valid. The rule is also applicable to an obviousness analysis. Under the rule, a single reference (for anticipation) or the combination of references relied upon, plus the ordinary knowledge of persons skilled in the art (for obviousness), must provide each claimed element. For anticipation, and under certain circumstances for obviousness, the doctrine of inherency may be relied on to meet this test.

== See also ==
- Claim (patent)
