= Cloem =

French company dealing in natural language processing

Cloem company logo

Cloem is a company based in Cannes, France, which applies natural language processing (NLP) technologies to assist patent applicants in creating variants of patent claims, called "cloems". According to the company, these "computer-generated claims can be published to keep potential competitors from attempting to file adjacent patent claims."

== Technology ==
According to Cloem, dictionaries, ontologies and proprietary claim-drafting algorithms are used to draft alternative claims based on a client's original set of claims. In particular, the original set of claims is subject to various permutations and linguistic manipulations "by considering alternative definitions for terms as well as “synonyms, hyponyms, hyperonyms, meronyms, holonyms, and antonyms.”"

== Possible uses ==
Cloem can optionally publish one or more created texts, as electronic publications or as paper-printed publications. These can potentially serve – through a defensive publication – as prior art to prevent another party for obtaining a patent on the subject-matter at stake. In other words, after an initial patent filing, an "improvement" patent (adjacent invention) can be applied for by another party, such as a competitor. By publishing variants of a patent claim, the risk of adverse patenting may potentially be decreased (improvement inventions may no longer be patentable).

Cloems may also be potentially patentable. One of the issues of patentability, however, is that only a natural person can be a listed as an inventor on a patent. Since cloems are produced by a computer based on a person's input, it is not clear if the computer or the person is the inventor. The inventorship of Cloem texts is an open question.
