= List of United States Supreme Court cases, volume 56 =

Supreme Court of the United States
- Interactive map of Supreme Court of the United States
- 38°53′26″N 77°00′16″W
- Established: March 4, 1789; 236 years ago
- Location: Washington, D.C.
- Coordinates: 38°53′26″N 77°00′16″W
- Composition method: Presidential nomination with Senate confirmation
- Authorised by: Constitution of the United States, Art. III, § 1
- Judge term length: life tenure, subject to impeachment and removal
- Number of positions: 9 (by statute)
- Website: supremecourt.gov

This is a list of cases reported in volume 56 (15 How.) of United States Reports, decided by the Supreme Court of the United States in 1853 and 1854.

== Nominative reports ==
In 1874, the U.S. government created the United States Reports, and retroactively numbered older privately published case reports as part of the new series. As a result, cases appearing in volumes 1–90 of U.S. Reports have dual citation forms; one for the volume number of U.S. Reports, and one for the volume number of the reports named for the relevant reporter of decisions (these are called "nominative reports").

=== Benjamin Chew Howard ===
Starting with the 42nd volume of U.S. Reports, the Reporter of Decisions of the Supreme Court of the United States was Benjamin Chew Howard. Howard was Reporter of Decisions from 1843 to 1860, covering volumes 42 through 65 of United States Reports which correspond to volumes 1 through 24 of his Howard's Reports. As such, the dual form of citation to, for example, Corning v. Troy Iron & Nail Factory is 56 U.S. (15 How.) 451 (1854).

== Justices of the Supreme Court at the time of 56 U.S. (15 How.) ==
The Supreme Court is established by Article III, Section 1 of the Constitution of the United States, which says: "The judicial Power of the United States, shall be vested in one supreme Court . . .". The size of the Court is not specified; the Constitution leaves it to Congress to set the number of justices. Under the Judiciary Act of 1789 Congress originally fixed the number of justices at six (one chief justice and five associate justices). Since 1789 Congress has varied the size of the Court from six to seven, nine, ten, and back to nine justices (always including one chief justice).

When the cases in 56 U.S. (15 How.) were decided the Court comprised these nine members:

Portrait	Justice	Office	Home State	Succeeded	Date confirmed by the Senate (Vote)	Tenure on Supreme Court
	Roger B. Taney	Chief Justice	Maryland	John Marshall	March 15, 1836 (29–15)	March 28, 1836 – October 12, 1864 (Died)
	John McLean	Associate Justice	Ohio	Robert Trimble	March 7, 1829 (Acclamation)	January 11, 1830 – April 4, 1861 (Died)
	James Moore Wayne	Associate Justice	Georgia	William Johnson	January 9, 1835 (Acclamation)	January 14, 1835 – July 5, 1867 (Died)
	John Catron	Associate Justice	Tennessee	newly created seat	March 8, 1837 (28–15)	May 1, 1837 – May 30, 1865 (Died)
	Peter Vivian Daniel	Associate Justice	Virginia	Philip P. Barbour	March 2, 1841 (25–5)	January 10, 1842 – May 31, 1860 (Died)
	Samuel Nelson	Associate Justice	New York	Smith Thompson	February 14, 1845 (Acclamation)	February 27, 1845 – November 28, 1872 (Retired)
	Robert Cooper Grier	Associate Justice	Pennsylvania	Henry Baldwin	August 4, 1846 (Acclamation)	August 10, 1846 – January 31, 1870 (Retired)
	Benjamin Robbins Curtis	Associate Justice	Massachusetts	Levi Woodbury	December 20, 1851 (Acclamation)	October 10, 1851 – September 30, 1857 (Resigned)
	John Archibald Campbell	Associate Justice	Alabama	John McKinley	March 22, 1853 (Acclamation)	April 11, 1853 – April 30, 1861 (Resigned)

== Notable case in 56 U.S. (15 How.) ==
=== O'Reilly v. Morse ===
O'Reilly v. Morse, 56 U.S. (15 How.) 62 (1853), also known as The Telegraph Patent Case, is an 1854 decision of the Supreme Court that has been highly influential in the development of the law of patent-eligibility in regard to claimed inventions in the field of computer-software related art. It holds, essentially, that an abstract idea, apart from its implementation, is not patent-eligible.

== Citation style ==
Under the Judiciary Act of 1789 the federal court structure at the time comprised District Courts, which had general trial jurisdiction; Circuit Courts, which had mixed trial and appellate (from the US District Courts) jurisdiction; and the United States Supreme Court, which had appellate jurisdiction over the federal District and Circuit courts—and for certain issues over state courts. The Supreme Court also had limited original jurisdiction (i.e., in which cases could be filed directly with the Supreme Court without first having been heard by a lower federal or state court). There were one or more federal District Courts and/or Circuit Courts in each state, territory, or other geographical region.

Bluebook citation style is used for case names, citations, and jurisdictions.

- "C.C.D." = United States Circuit Court for the District of . . .
  - e.g.,"C.C.D.N.J." = United States Circuit Court for the District of New Jersey
- "D." = United States District Court for the District of . . .
  - e.g.,"D. Mass." = United States District Court for the District of Massachusetts
- "E." = Eastern; "M." = Middle; "N." = Northern; "S." = Southern; "W." = Western
  - e.g.,"C.C.S.D.N.Y." = United States Circuit Court for the Southern District of New York
  - e.g.,"M.D. Ala." = United States District Court for the Middle District of Alabama
- "Ct. Cl." = United States Court of Claims
- The abbreviation of a state's name alone indicates the highest appellate court in that state's judiciary at the time.
  - e.g.,"Pa." = Supreme Court of Pennsylvania
  - e.g.,"Me." = Supreme Judicial Court of Maine

== List of cases in 56 U.S. (15 How.) ==
Case Name	Page and year	Opinion of the Court	Concurring opinion(s)	Dissenting opinion(s)	Lower Court	Disposition
United States v. Davenport's Heirs	1 (1853)	Campbell	none	none	E.D. La.	multiple
United States v. Patterson	10 (1853)	Campbell	none	none	E.D. La.	multiple
United States v. d'Auterieve	14 (1854)	Nelson	none	Curtis	E.D. La.	reversed
United States v. Roselius I	31 (1853)	Catron	none	none	E.D. La.	reversed
United States v. Roselius II	36 (1853)	Taney	none	none	E.D. La.	reversed
United States v. Ducros	38 (1854)	Grier	none	none	E.D. La.	reversed
Eyre v. Potter	42 (1854)	Daniel	none	none	C.C.D.N.C.	affirmed
O'Reilly v. Morse	62 (1854)	Taney	Grier	Grier	C.C.D. Ky.	multiple
Smith v. Ely	137 (1854)	Taney	none	none	C.C.D. Ohio	certification
Broome v. United States	143 (1854)	Wayne	none	none	C.C.N.D. Fla.	affirmed
Phelps v. Mayer	160 (1854)	Taney	none	none	C.C.D. Ind.	affirmed
Bispham v. Price	162 (1854)	Campbell	none	none	C.C.E.D. Pa.	affirmed
Bevins v. Ramsey	179 (1854)	Catron	none	none	C.C.E.D. Tenn.	affirmed
Rockhill v. Hanna	189 (1854)	Grier	none	none	C.C.D. Ind.	certification
Kanouse v. Martin	198 (1854)	Curtis	none	none	N.Y. Super. Ct.	reversed
Brooks v. Fiske	212 (1854)	Catron	none	McLean	C.C.D. Mass.	affirmed
Northern Indiana Railroad Company v. Michigan Central Railroad Company	233 (1854)	McLean	Catron; Campbell	none	C.C.D. Mich.	affirmed
Corning v. Burden	252 (1854)	Grier	none	none	C.C.N.D.N.Y.	reversed
Garrow v. Davis	272 (1854)	Curtis	none	none	C.C.D. Me.	affirmed
Magniac v. Thomson	281 (1854)	Daniel	none	none	C.C.E.D. Pa.	affirmed
Curran v. Arkansas	304 (1853)	Curtis	none	Catron; Daniel	Ark.	reversed
Anderson v. Bock	323 (1854)	Campbell	none	none	C.C.E.D. La.	reversed
Winans v. Denmead	330 (1854)	Curtis	none	Campbell	C.C.D. Md.	reversed
Established the doctrine of equivalents: Even if not literally within the claims, a device infringes if it arrives at the same result in the same way.
Walworth v. Kneel	348 (1854)	Taney	none	none	Wis.	dismissed
Carter v. Bennett	354 (1854)	Taney	none	none	Fla.	dismissed
Forsyth v. Reynolds	358 (1854)	Catron	none	none	C.C.D. Ill.	reversed
McDonogh's Executors v. Murdoch	367 (1854)	Campbell	none	none	C.C.E.D. La.	reversed
Wylie v. Coxe	415 (1854)	McLean	none	none	C.C.D.C.	affirmed
Murray v. Gibson	421 (1854)	Daniel	none	none	C.C.S.D. Miss.	certification
Den ex rel. Russell v. Association of New Jersey Company	426 (1854)	Taney	none	none	C.C.D.N.J.	affirmed
Foley v. Harrison	433 (1854)	McLean	none	none	La.	affirmed
Corning v. Troy Iron and Nail Factory	451 (1854)	Grier	none	none	C.C.N.D.N.Y.	dismissed
United States v. Dawson	467 (1854)	Nelson	none	McLean	C.C.E.D. Ark.	certification
Kearney v. Taylor	494 (1854)	Nelson	none	none	C.C.D.N.J.	affirmed
Delauriere v. Emison	525 (1854)	McLean	none	none	Mo.	affirmed
Adams v. Otterback	539 (1854)	McLean	none	none	C.C.D.C.	affirmed
Livingston v. Woodworth	546 (1854)	Daniel	none	none	C.C.D. Mass.	reversed

== See also ==
certificate of division
