= Patent Reform Act of 2005 =

Legislation Proposed in 109th United States Congress

The Patent Reform Act of 2005 (H.R. 2795) was United States patent legislation proposed in the 109th United States Congress. Texas Republican Congressman Lamar S. Smith introduced the Act on 8 June 2005. Smith called the Act "the most comprehensive change to U.S. patent law since Congress passed the 1952 Patent Act." The Act proposed many of the recommendations made by a 2003 report by the Federal Trade Commission and a 2004 report by the National Academy of Sciences.

The 109th Congress concluded on January 3, 2007 without enacting H.R. 2795. Much of the proposed Act was carried into the proposed Patent Reform Act of 2007 (H.R. 1908, S. 1145), which was introduced in the 110th Congress on 18 April 2007. A similar act was introduced as the Patent Reform Act of 2009 in the 111th Congress.

== Proposed changes in U.S. patent law ==
H.R. 2795 would have harmonized American patent law with the patent laws of the rest of the world by making the following changes in U.S. patent law:

=== Switch from first to invent to first to file ===
The United States is currently the only country in the world that gives priority to the application that claims the earliest invention date, regardless of which application arrives first. The first-to-invent system is thought to benefit small inventors, who may be less experienced with the patent application system. Critics of the first-to-file system also contend it will create a "race to the mailbox," and result in sloppier, last-minute patent applications. The first-to-invent system, however, requires the United States Patent and Trademark Office (USPTO) to undertake lengthy and complicated "interference" proceedings to try to determine who invented something first when claims conflict. The first-to-file system, supporters contend, would inject much-needed certainty into the patent application process. Finally, because every other country is on a first-to-file system, supporters claim that the majority of patent applicants and attorneys are already operating on a first-to-file basis.

A first-to-file priority rule does not permit one individual to copy another's invention and then, by virtue of being the first to file a patent application, be entitled to a patent. All patent applicants must have originated the invention themselves, rather than derived it from another person. In order to police this requirement, the proposed H.R. 2795 provided for "inventor's rights contests" that would have allowed the USPTO to determine which applicant is entitled to a patent on a particular invention.

=== Expand prior user rights ===
Even under a first-to-invent system, the first-inventor-in-fact does not always obtain entitlement to a patent. If, for example, a first-inventor-in-fact maintained his invention as a trade secret for many years before seeking patent protection, he may be judged to have "abandoned, suppressed or concealed" the invention. Well-established patent law provides that an inventor who makes a secret, commercial use of an invention for more than one year prior to filing a patent application at the USPTO forfeits his own right to a patent. If an earlier inventor made secret commercial use of an invention, and another person independently invented the same technology later and obtained patent protection, then the trade secret holder could face liability for patent infringement. Many foreign patent regimes, on the other hand, protect prior user rights, which are often seen as assisting small entities that may lack the sophistication or resources to pursue patent protection. The American Inventors Protection Act of 1999 established a "first inventor defense," but limited the defense to patents on "methods of doing or conducting business;" H.R. 2795 would have extended it to all subject matter.

=== Publish patent applications ===
Outside the United States, pending patent applications are published 18 months after they are filed, which forewarns competitors that a patent is pending. Prior to 2000, American patent applications were never published. The American Inventors Protection Act allowed pre-grant publication 18 months after filing unless the inventor certified that he would not be seeking patent protection abroad. H.R. 2795 would have closed this loophole.

=== Allow pre-issuance protests by third parties ===
Historically, interested individuals could enter a "protest" against a pending patent application. Critics contended that protests serve mainly to permit third parties to slow down the process for competitors. On the other hand, protests are the only way for third parties to challenge a patent prior to approval, when recourse is only available through the court system. The American Inventors Protection Act severely limited protests, but H.R. 2795 would have eliminated those limitations.

=== Expand use of post-issuance reexamination and opposition proceedings ===
Since 1981, the U.S. patent system has incorporated "reexamination" proceedings, during which third parties can submit information challenging the validity of a patent. In order to discourage abuse of these proceedings, third-party participants may not later assert that a patent is invalid "on any ground that [they] raised or could have raised during the inter partes reexamination proceedings." Some observers believe that this estoppel dissuades potential requesters from use of reexamination, forcing them into federal court. H.R. 2795 would have deleted the phrase "or could have raised" from the statute, so that reexamination requesters would be limited only with respect to arguments that they actually made before the USPTO.

H.R. 2795 would have also established post-grant opposition proceedings, a feature that is common in foreign patent regimes. Oppositions allow a wide range of potential invalidity arguments and are conducted through adversarial hearings that resemble courtroom litigation, but because they limit discovery and involve a lower burden of proof, oppositions are cheaper and faster than lawsuits.

=== Eliminate the "best mode" requirement ===
Patent applications are currently required to "set forth the best mode contemplated by the inventor of carrying out his invention." This requirement is unique to American patent law, and was identified in the 2004 National Academy of Sciences report as one of the three subjective elements that contribute to high patent litigation costs. H.R. 2795 would have eliminated it.

=== Modify the patent law doctrine of willful infringement ===
In patent infringement cases, treble damages are currently available if the court finds the infringement was "willful." This is the second subjective factor that has been identified as increasing the length and cost of patent infringement suits. To avoid an allegation of willful infringement, many inventors purposely ignore learning about new patents, which contravenes one of the central purposes of the patent system, the dissemination of scientific knowledge. H.R. 2795 would have limited treble damages to cases in which the plaintiff notified the defendant of the patent, claims and violation, and permit pleading willful infringement only after a court finds that the patent was valid, enforceable, and infringed.

=== Modify the patent law doctrine of inequitable conduct ===
Defendants in infringement suits are currently allowed to allege that the patent is unenforceable because the patent holder did not operate honestly and in good faith when it applied for a patent. This is the third subjective factor that has been identified as increasing the length and cost of infringement suits. H.R. 2795 would have eliminated this defense, instead codifying a duty of candor for all parties in proceedings before the USPTO, and providing authority for the PTO to investigate allegations of inequitable conduct and impose civil penalties.

=== Allow patent applications to be submitted by an assignee ===
Most foreign countries already allow patent applications to be submitted by an assignee as long as the oath of invention is signed. H.R. 2795 would have adopted a similar rule in the United States.

=== Limit access to injunctions ===
Injunctions are currently awarded in patent infringement cases if the plaintiff satisfies a four-part test. A plaintiff must demonstrate: (1) that it has suffered an irreparable injury; (2) that remedies are not available at law; (3) that, considering the balance of hardships between the plaintiff and defendant, a remedy in equity is warranted; and (4) that the public interest would not be disserviced by a permanent injunction. H.R. 2795, as originally introduced, would have required a court to consider the "fairness" of an injunction in light of all the facts and the relevant interests of the parties, and allow an injunction to be stayed pending appeal upon an affirmative showing that the stay would not result in irreparable harm to the owner.

This is among the most controversial issues in patent reform. Software and information technology companies generally support limiting injunctions, because their products often involve hundreds or thousands of patents, and a dispute over any of them can result in an injunction that halts production on the entire item. Biotechnology and pharmaceutical companies, on the other hand, generally oppose limiting injunctions, because the items they manufacture are easily analyzed and reproduced and generally involve only one or two patents.

== See also ==
- Intellectual property legislation pending in the United States Congress
- Patent Reform Act of 2007
- Patent Reform Act of 2009
