= Coalition for 21st Century Patent Reform =

The Coalition for 21st Century Patent Reform (CFCPR) is an ad hoc organization of companies who are lobbying for reforms to the US patent system. They are opposed to various provision of the Patent Reform Act of 2007, including its limitations for damages due to patent infringement, and the "second window" post-grant review.

== Principles ==
The CFCPR believes that the following principles should drive patent reform

- "Provide the USPTO with adequate resources to assure quality examination of all patent applications."
- "Significantly limit 'subjective elements in patent litigation. These include the 'inequitable conduct' defense to a patent's enforceability, awarding punitive damages based upon 'willful infringement', and the 'best mode requirement."
- "Enact the NAS-recommended harmonizing changes to the U.S. patent laws, i.e., adopt the first-inventor-to-file principle and eliminate the "best mode" requirement."
- "Provide an "open review" (post-grant opposition) procedure that facilitates challenging questionable patents in the USPTO."

== Membership ==
The membership of the Coalition for 21st Century Patent Reform includes nearly 50 companies from 19 different industries, including:

- 3M
- Caterpillar Inc.
- Eli Lilly and Company
- General Electric
- Johnson & Johnson
- Procter & Gamble

== Steering committee ==
- Steven Miller, Procter & Gamble Vice President and General Counsel Intellectual Property
- Gary Griswald, 3M

== See also ==
- Coalition for Patent Fairness who were strongly in favor of the Patent Reform Act of 2007 and its successors
