= Transitional phrase =

Phrase within a US patent

A transitional phrase, in United States patent law, is a phrase that links the preamble of a patent claim to the specific elements set forth in the claim which define what the invention itself actually is. The transitional phrase acts as a limitation on the claim, indicating whether a similar device, method, or composition infringes the patent if it contains more or fewer elements than the claim in the patent.

There are three kinds of transitional phrases: open, closed, and hybrid.

== Closed transition ==
A closed transition usually uses the words "consisting of.” Use of this phrase limits the preamble to exactly what follows and nothing more. An example would be a patent claim for a pencil, which might say in the preamble "a writing device", followed by the closed transition "consisting of", and concluding with a description such as "a cylindrical piece of lead, graphite, or another material similarly capable of leaving a mark when drawn against a surface, and a second surrounding material encasing the first". A third party who sold pencils including both a cylinder of writing material and a casing material, but added to his pencils an eraser fixed to one end, would therefore not be in violation of the patent. Use of such a transition makes it easy for a competitor to compete with the patented product without infringing it, because it allows the competitor to sell a similar device so long as the competitor makes an addition to what is claimed. However, it also may assist the patent owner in avoiding prior art, which might otherwise block the patent from issuing.

== Open transition ==
An open transition usually uses the word "comprises" or "comprising". This is the broadest form of transition, as it does not limit the preamble to whatever elements are identified in the claim. If the above patent used the word "comprising" instead of "consisting of", then the third party's pencil-plus-eraser would be infringing (assuming that the patent is otherwise valid).

== Hybrid transition ==
A third kind of transition, the hybrid transition, uses the phrase "consisting essentially of". The effect of this transitional phrase is to leave the claim "open" to include additional elements, but only if those additional elements do not materially affect the basic and novel characteristics of the claimed combination. In this instance, the pencil with the eraser added might still not be infringing, but a pencil with a fin or a non-functional button would still infringe, because the thing that was added would serve no purpose material to the claimed functions of the pencil. This language assists in avoiding prior art, but is broad enough to capture imperfect attempts to copy the patented device.

== See also ==
- Point of novelty

== Sources ==
- Randall R. Rader, John R. Thomas, Martin J. Adelman, and Harold C. Wegner, Cases and Materials on Patent Law, 2d edition (2002), p. 541–542.
