= United States Statutory Invention Registration =

In former United States patent law, a statutory invention registration (SIR) was a publication of an invention by the United States Patent and Trademark Office (USPTO). The publication was made at the request of the applicant (i.e. inventor(s) or assignee(s)). In order for an applicant to have a patent application published as an SIR, the following conditions had to be met:

1. The application must disclose the invention in sufficient detail that another person of ordinary skill in the art can make and use the invention without undue experimentation (i.e. the application meets the requirements of 35 U.S.C. § 112);
2. The application complies with the requirements for printing, as set forth in regulations of the Director of the patent office;
3. The applicant waives the right to receive a patent on the invention within such period as may be prescribed by the Director; and
4. The applicant pays application, publication, and other processing fees established by the Director.

Historically, statutory invention registrations were used by applicants for publishing patent applications on which they no longer felt they could get patents. By publishing the patent applications, they helped ensure that the inventions were in the public domain and no one else could subsequently get a patent on them, as a SIR could be applied as prior art against other patent applications in the same manner as a patent. Statutory invention registrations had the kind code H.

As of the 1999 American Inventors Protection Act, however, most patent applications filed in the US have been published 18 months after they were filed. These published patent applications serve a similar purpose to a statutory invention registration. Once an application is published, an inventor need only let their application go abandoned in order to give up their right to a patent and dedicate the invention to the public.

Statutory invention registrations are no longer available under U.S. law since the Leahy-Smith America Invents Act (AIA) entered into force in 2013. "[T]he provisions of pre-AIA 35 U.S.C. 157 were repealed on March 16, 2013".

== See also ==
- IBM Technical Disclosure Bulletin
- Patent caveat
- Patent Commons
- United States Defensive Publication
- Utility model
