= Bayh–Dole Act =

United States law regarding patent rights and government research

- Other short titles: Government Patent Policy Act of 1980; Patent and Trademark System Reform
- Long title: An Act to amend the patent and trademark laws.
- Nicknames: Patent and Trademark Law Amendments Act
- Enacted by: the 96th United States Congress
- Effective: December 12, 1980

Citations
- Public law: 96-517
- Statutes at Large: 94 Stat. 3015

Codification
- Acts amended: Patent Act of 1790; Patent Act of 1836; Patent Act of 1922; Patent Act of 1952
- Titles amended: 35 U.S.C.: Patents
- U.S.C. sections amended: 35 U.S.C. ch. 30 § 201

Legislative history
- Introduced in the House as H.R. 6933 by Robert Kastenmeier (D–WI) on March 26, 1980; Committee consideration by House Judiciary, House Government Operations, Senate Judiciary; Passed the House on November 17, 1980 (passed); Signed into law by President Jimmy Carter on December 12, 1980

United States Supreme Court cases
- Stanford University v. Roche Molecular Systems, Inc., 563 U.S. 776 (2011)

The Bayh–Dole Act or Patent and Trademark Law Amendments Act (Pub. L. 96-517, December 12, 1980) is U.S. legislation permitting ownership by contractors of inventions arising from federal government-funded research. Sponsored by Senators Birch Bayh of Indiana and Bob Dole of Kansas, the Act was adopted in 1980, is codified at 94 Stat. 3015, and in 35 U.S.C. §§ 200–212, and is implemented by 37 C.F.R. 401 for federal funding agreements with contractors and 37 C.F.R 404 for licensing of inventions owned by the federal government.

The Bayh-Dole Act made a key change in federal contracting procedures that allowed contractors the right to retain ownership of inventions made with federal funding. Before the Bayh–Dole Act, the Federal Procurement Regulation required the use of a patent rights clause that in some cases required federal contractors or their inventors to assign inventions made under contract to the federal government unless the funding agency determined that the public interest was better served by allowing the contractor or inventor to retain principal or exclusive rights. The National Institutes of Health, National Science Foundation, and the Department of Commerce had implemented programs that permitted non-profit organizations to retain rights to inventions upon notice without requesting an agency determination. By contrast, Bayh–Dole uniformly permits non-profit organizations and small business firm contractors to retain ownership of inventions made under contract and which they have acquired, provided that each invention is timely disclosed and the contractor elects to retain ownership in that invention.

A second key change with Bayh–Dole was to authorize federal agencies to grant exclusive licenses to inventions owned by the federal government.

== History ==
The Bayh–Dole Act grew out of the Congress's efforts to respond to the economic malaise of the 1970s. One of Congress's efforts was focused on how best to manage inventions that were created with the more than $75 billion a year invested in government-sponsored R&D. Three philosophies were debated: "a Hamiltonian belief that the solution lay with a strong central government, which should take charge and actively manage these resources"; "a Jeffersonian belief that the solution lay with the individual and that the best thing government could do to provide incentives for success was to get out of the way of these individuals"; and a belief that "held that government could only hurt and that it should make sure that everyone benefited financially from government's efforts".

Prior to the enactment of Bayh–Dole, the U.S. government had accumulated 28,000 patents, but fewer than 5% of those patents were commercially licensed.

These patents had accumulated because after World War II, the government under President Harry S. Truman decided to continue and even ramp up its spending on research and development, on the basis of Vannevar Bush's famous report entitled, "Science The Endless Frontier", which stated: "Scientific progress is one essential key to our security as a nation, to our better health, to more jobs, to a higher standard of living, and to our cultural progress." However, the government did not have a unified patent policy governing all the agencies that funded research, and the general policy was that government would retain title to inventions and would license them only nonexclusively. A report by the Government Accountability Office found that "Those seeking to use government-owned technology found a maze of rules and regulations set out by the agencies in question because there was no uniform federal policy on patents for government-sponsored inventions or on the transfer of technology from the government to the private sector."

In 1968, the Department of Health, Education, and Welfare (HEW) introduced a uniform "Institutional Patent Agreement" (IPA) to allow grantee nonprofit institutions to obtain assignment of patentable inventions made with federal funding for which the institution had decided to seek patents. By 1978, over seventy universities and research organizations had negotiated an IPA with HEW or with the National Science Foundation. In the 1970s, faculty at Purdue University in Indiana had made important discoveries under grants from the Department of Energy, which did not issue Institutional Patent Agreements. Officials at the university complained to their senator, Birch Bayh, whose staff investigated. At the same time, Senator Robert Dole was made aware of similar issues, and the two senators agreed to collaborate on a bill, along the lines of the "Jeffersonian belief" described above.

Accordingly, as described below, the legislation decentralized control of federally funded inventions, vesting the responsibility and authority to commercialize inventions with the institution or company receiving a grant, with certain responsibilities to the government, the inventor, and the public, as described below.

== Recipient requirements ==
The Bayh–Dole Act authorizes the Department of Commerce to create standard patent rights clauses to be included in federal funding agreements with nonprofits, including universities, and small businesses. The standard patent rights clause is set forth at 37 CFR 401.14. The clause is incorporated into federal funding agreements through a number of contracting instruments, including grants made to universities and contracts made with for-profit companies. The Department of Commerce has delegated to the National Institute of Standards and Technology to promulgate implementing regulations for Bayh–Dole.

Under the standard patent rights clause, small businesses and non-profit organizations, if they obtain title by assignment to "subject inventions," can retain that title by complying with certain formalities. No small business or nonprofit organization, however, is required to obtain ownership of such inventions. All organizations agree to do the following:

- Include the patent rights clause in any subcontracts;
- Report subject inventions to the sponsoring agency;
- Elect in writing whether or not to retain title;
- Conduct a program of education for employees regarding the importance of timely disclosure; and
- Require certain employees to make a written agreement to protect the government's interest in subject inventions.

The U.S. Supreme Court clarified in Stanford v Roche (2011), that the Bayh-Dole Act did not change the constitutional provision, that the original ownership of patents always vests with their inventor(s), and that the inventors' employers can own patents, only when inventors explicitly assign their patents to their employers.

If an organization does not elect to retain title to a subject invention that it has acquired, then the Federal agency may request title. The agency may waive its right to take title to the invention, and allow the inventors to retain title to their inventions.

External videos
- Katharine Ku-The Bayh–Dole Act

If an organization elects to retain title to a subject invention for which it has obtained assignment, the organization is obligated to do the following:

- Grant to the government a nonexclusive, nontransferable, irrevocable, paid-up license to practice or have practiced for or on behalf of the United States the subject invention throughout the world;
- File its initial patent application within one year after its election to retain title;
- Notify the government if it will not continue prosecution of an application or will let a patent lapse;
- Convey to the Federal agency, upon written request, title to any subject invention if the organization fails to file, does not continue a prosecution, or will allow a patent to lapse;
- In each patent include a statement that identifies the contract under which the invention was made and notice of the government's rights in the invention;
- Report on the utilization of subject inventions;
- Require in exclusive licenses to use or sell in the United States that products will be manufactured substantially in the United States; and
- Agree to allow the government to "march in" and require licenses to be granted, or to grant licenses, in certain circumstances, such as if the organization has not taken effective steps to achieve practical application of the invention.

Certain additional requirements apply to nonprofit organizations only. Nonprofits must also:

- Assign rights to a subject invention only to an organization having as a primary function the management of inventions, unless approved by the Federal agency;
- Share royalties with the inventor;
- Use the balance of royalties after expenses for scientific research or education;
- Make efforts to attract, and give preference to, small business licensees.

=== Subject inventions ===
A subject invention is defined as "any invention of the contractor that is conceived or first actually reduced to practice in the performance of work under a funding agreement." The U.S. Supreme Court in Stanford v Roche made clear that "of" in "of the contractor" means ownership. ("And 'invention owned by the contractor' or 'invention belonging to the contractor' are natural readings of the phrase “invention of the contractor.”). If an invention is not owned by a party to the federal funding agreement, then it cannot be a subject invention and does not come within the scope of Bayh–Dole.

The CFR addresses the relationship between federal funding and other funding that may supplement the federally supported research. If an invention is made outside the research activities of the federally funded research "without interference with or cost to the government-funded project," then the invention is not a subject invention. Similarly, an invention is not a subject invention if it arises in closely related research outside the "planned and committed activities" of the federally funded project, and the closely related research does not "diminish or distract from the performance" of the federally funded project.

== Legal proceedings and case law ==
There is a growing body of case law on Bayh–Dole.

=== Ownership of inventions ===
Stanford v. Roche, was a case decided by the Supreme Court that held that title in a patented invention vests first in the inventor, even if the inventor is a researcher at a federally funded lab subject to the Bayh–Dole Act. The judges affirmed the common understanding of US Constitutional law that inventors automatically own their inventions, and contractual obligations to assign those rights to third parties are secondary.

The case arose because a Stanford employee, who was under obligation to assign certain inventions to Stanford, if Stanford was required by law or contract to own them, was sent by Stanford faculty to work at a biotech company to learn polymerase chain reaction, a proprietary technique, and signed an agreement with that company assigning his future inventions, related to the PCR method, that he learned from the company. The company was later purchased by Roche. Stanford filed patents on PCR-related inventions, that the employee made, after he returned to Stanford. Roche, that purchased the startup soon thereafter, introduced the first commercially successful HIV tests, which embodied the PCR technology of the Stanford's patents. When Stanford sued Roche for infringing its patents, Roche countered, that it had an ownership interest in the patents due to the agreement that the Stanford employee had signed earlier with the startup company. Among the arguments Stanford made at the District, Federal Circuit, and Supreme Court levels, was one that stated that the Bayh–Dole Act gave grant recipients a "right of second refusal" subject to the Government's right of first refusal, based on the following language of the statute: "If a contractor does not elect to retain title to a subject invention in cases subject to this section, the Federal agency may consider and after consultation with the contractor grant requests for retention of rights by the inventor subject to the provisions of this Act and regulations promulgated hereunder."

While the district court accepted that argument, both the Federal Circuit and the Supreme Court denied it, leaving the basic law of inventorship unchanged and making clear that Bayh–Dole did not give federal contractors any special right to inventions made in federally funded work.

=== Disclosure of subject inventions ===
Only one case has discussed the implications of disclosing subject inventions. In Campbell Plastics Engineering & Mfg., Inc. v. Les Brownlee, 389 F.3d 1243 (Fed. Cir. 2004), the court held that since the appellant failed to comply with the invention disclosure provisions of a contract, the court upheld the transfer of title to an invention to the U.S. Army. Specifically, the contract required, per Bayh–Dole, that an invention be disclosed to the U.S. Army through a specific form, DD Form 882s. Campbell Plastics never disclosed its subject invention through this form. Campbell Plastics argued instead that it disclosed all parts of its invention over the course of the contract, but simply never used the form. The court did not specifically address the legitimacy of the particular form, but assumed that it was sufficient. Nevertheless, the court found that the "piecemeal submissions [did] not adequately disclose the subject invention under the contract." The result was a forfeiture of the subject invention.

=== Extent of the government's license ===
In a footnote in a famous experimental use case, Madey v. Duke University, 307 F.3d 1351 (Fed. Cir. 2002), the court briefly mentions Bayh–Dole in suggesting that experimental uses by researchers are supported under the law. Specifically, the Madey court quoted the district court as holding that where a subject invention exists and the defendant is a recipient of government funding, "in light of the Bayh–Dole Act ... use of the patents that has been authorized by the government does not constitute patent infringement."

=== Bayh–Dole and patentability ===
In University of Rochester v. G.D. Searle & Co., 358 F.3d 916 (Fed. Cir. 2004), the court rejected a claim that Bayh–Dole altered the grounds for patentability. The court, quoting an amicus curiae, stated

no connection exists between the Bayh–Dole Act and the legal standards that courts employ to assess patentability. Furthermore, none of the eight policy objectives of the Bayh–Dole Act encourages or condones less stringent application of the patent laws to universities than to other entities.

=== Petitions for march-in rights ===
External videos
- Francis Collins and Senator Durbin on NIH march-in rights, April 7, 2016 Senate Hearing

The government's march-in right is one of the most contentious provisions in Bayh–Dole. It allows the funding agency, on its own initiative or at the request of a third party, to effectively ignore the exclusivity of a patent awarded under the act and grant additional licenses to other "reasonable applicants". This right is strictly limited and can only be exercised if the agency determines, following an investigation, that one of four criteria is met. The most important of these is a failure by the contractor to take "effective steps to achieve practical application of the subject invention" or a failure to satisfy "health and safety needs" of consumers.

Though this right is, in theory, quite powerful, it has not proven so in terms of its practical application—as of January, 2015, no federal agency has exercised its march-in rights. Five march-in petitions have been made to the National Institutes of Health.

In In Re Petition of CellPro, Inc., CellPro petitioned the NIH in March 1997 after five years of patent litigation with Johns Hopkins University and Baxter Healthcare. CellPro had a patented, FDA-approved device for purifying stem cells for use in hematopoietic stem cell transplantation procedures; Johns Hopkins had patents on a different method to purify stem cells and had licensed them to Becton Dickinson, which had sublicensed them to Baxter, which was developing products but had none on the market. CellPro argued that the march-in provisions were created for this situation, especially because (in its view) availability of essential medical technology was at stake. The NIH denied this claim citing:

- Johns Hopkins's licensing of the subject invention
- Baxter's use, manufacturing, and practice of the subject invention
- Baxter's application to the Food and Drug Administration (FDA) to market the invention
- The actual clinical benefit of purifying stem cells for use in hematopoietic stem cell transplantation was unknown
- Government intervention into markets has adverse effects and there is insufficient cause to do so in this case.

In In the Case of NORVIR, the NIH received requests from Essential Inventions in January 2004, and other members of the public and members of the United States Congress, to exercise march-in rights for patents owned by Abbott Labs covering the drug ritonavir, sold under the trade name Norvir, a prescription drug used in the treatment of HIV infection. In 2003 Abbott raised the price of Norvir 400% for U.S. customers (but not for consumers in any other country), and had refused to license ritonavir to another company for purposes for providing protease inhibitors coformulated with ritonavir. The NIH denied the petition finding no grounds to exercise its march-in rights. The NIH cited:

- The availability of Norvir to patients with AIDS
- That there was no evidence that health and safety needs were not adequately met by Abbott, and
- That the NIH should not address the issue of drug pricing, only Congress.

In In the Case of Xalatan the NIH received a request from Essential Inventions in January 2004 to adopt a policy of granting march-in licenses to patents when the patent owner charged significantly higher prices in the United States than they did in other high income countries, on the basis of Pfizer's glaucoma drug being sold in the United States at two to five times the prices in other high income countries. The NIH held that "the extraordinary remedy of march-in was not an appropriate means for controlling prices."

In In the Case of Fabrazyme patients with Fabry disease petitioned on August 2, 2010, for march-in rights in response to Genzyme's inability to manufacture enough Fabrazyme to treat all Fabry patients. In 2009, Genzyme rationed the drug to less than a third of the recommended dose as a result of manufacturing problems and FDA sanctions, but did not anticipate being able to meet the market needs until late 2011. The patients had a return of their symptoms and were put at greater risk of morbidity and mortality at the reduced dosage. The petitioners contended that where a licensee of a public invention has created a drug shortage, the public health requirements of the Bayh–Dole Act are not met and other manufacturers should be allowed to enter the market.

On November 3, 2010, the NIH denied the petition for march-in, stating that under the then-current FDA drug approval process, it would take years of clinical testing to bring a biosimilar of Fabrazyme to market and therefore march-in would not address the problem. The NIH also stated that it would continue to monitor the situation and if Genzyme could not meet its production deadlines, or if a third party licensee requested a license, the march-in request would be revisited. The NIH additionally required regular updates from Mount Sinai School of Medicine, the patent holder, which agreed to not seek injunctions for potentially infringing products being sold during the shortage. On February 13, 2013, NIH's Office of Technology Transfer issued a "close out" letter stating that: "The December 2012 report from Genzyme stated that: (1) U.S. Fabry patients remain on full dose regimens, (2) Genzyme continues to accommodate new patients with full dosing and without placing them on a waiting list; and (3) Genzyme is able to provide full doses of Fabrazyme to patients transitioning to Fabrazyme.

On October 25, 2012, the NIH received a petition on behalf of a coalition of public interest groups to exercise its march-in rights against AbbVie over its antiretroviral drug ritonavir (sold under the name Norvir). On October 25, 2013, NIH denied the petition stating that, as in 2004 when similar pricing and availability issues regarding the same drug were raised and discussed at public hearings, the NIH'S role in the case was limited to compliance with the Bayh–Dole Act and that "... the extraordinary remedy of march-in is not an appropriate means of controlling prices of drugs broadly available ...".

A more comprehensive list for "march-in petitions" can be found here:

Unlike march-in rights, the government has occasionally exercised its ability to use patented inventions pursuant to 28 U.S.C. § 1498(a), particularly when HHS sought to stockpile the antibiotic ciproflaxin (brand name Cipro) in the wake of the 2001 anthrax attacks. Under § 1498(a), the government may use patented inventions without permission from a patentee, while paying the patent holder 'reasonable and entire compensation' which is usually "set at ten percent of sales or less".

=== No third party rights are created ===
Despite an ambiguity noted by commentators as to the effects on the public of a contractor's failure to comply with the requirements of Bayh–Dole, the courts have clarified that any such failure does not in and of itself divest an owner of title or render a patent invalid.

== Effect on academic innovation ==
Several studies tried to understand what were the effects of the Act on patenting by university researchers and on technology transfer from academia to industry. A 2022 Stanford study was "unable to conclude that higher inventor’s royalty shares have any effect on the number of invention disclosures or patent applications at a university," but it found that 60% of patents licensed by US universities were non-exclusive, which suggests that patent incentive was not necessary to commercialize these inventions. All most profitable university patents were licensed non-exclusively and were related to biotechnology.

Cohen–Boyer patents on recombinant DNA technology, which were licensed nonexclusively to over 400 firms, brought in $255 million to Stanford University. Columbia University Axel patents on methods of introducing genes for foreign proteins into cells brought in $790 million in revenue through nonexclusive licensing to Columbia.

There is some evidence that the number of technology transfer offices (TTOs) increased because of the Act. Although the majority of the TTOs were found to be unable to cover their own expenses and when opportunity costs were considered universities were losing millions of dollars per year on the patent process.

== See also ==
- Technology transfer
- Tragedy of the anticommons
- Government-funded research
