= Public disclosure =

A public disclosure is any non-confidential communication which an inventor or invention owner makes to one or more members of the public, revealing the existence of the invention and enabling an appropriately experienced individual ("person having ordinary skill in the art") to reproduce the invention. A public disclosure may be any form of non-confidential communication.

== Patent law ==
In some countries, public disclosure may result in the immediate loss of invention patentability unless a patent application has already been filed, and disclosure may be considered to include oral as well as written communication.

=== Australia ===
The Full Federal Court of Australia held in Fuchs Lubricants v Quaker Chemical that the patent claims lacked novelty due to public disclosures made by the inventor Mr Thomas before any patent applications were filed. The public disclosures arose in the following way. In about September–October 2010, Mr Thompson conceived the idea of using dyes in hydraulic fluid to enable detection of fluid injection injuries. He considered it would be necessary to conduct trials and experiments using hydraulic fluid in real operational mining equipment, so approached the engineering manager of Peabody Energy Australia Pty Ltd, which operated the Metropolitan mine in NSW. Mr Thompson disclosed the invention by explaining his proposed method (i.e., the invention) and discussed the possibility of running trials and experiments at the Metropolitan mine. A further disclosure occurred about a month later when, in the carpark of the Metropolitan mine, Mr Thompson demonstrated his invention to two Peabody managers. The Court found that these disclosures were not confidential and therefore constituted public disclosures that compromised the novelty of the invention.

=== United States ===
In the U.S., public disclosure of an invention results in the loss of patentability of the invention after a period of one year.

35 U.S.C. § 102 establishes various statutory bars to invention patentability with regard to invention novelty; these explicit bars preclude patentability as exceptions to a general underlying entitlement. The public disclosure bar is one of the bars established in section 102 (b):

"(b) the invention was patented or described in a printed publication in this or a foreign country or in public use or on sale in this country, more than one year prior to the date of the application for patent in the United States..."

"Printed publications" generally include all paper and electronic forms of publication. For example, books, scientific journals, posters, conference slide presentations, and website articles would all qualify as disclosure media.

== See also ==
- On-sale bar
