= Patent caveat =

Former official notice of intent to file a patent

A patent caveat, often shortened to caveat, was a legal document filed with the United States Patent Office.

== History ==
Caveats were instituted by the U.S. Patent Act of 1836, but were discontinued in 1909, with the U.S. Congress abolishing the system formally in 1910. A caveat was similar to a patent application with a description of an invention and drawings, but without examination for patentable subject matter and without a requirement for patent claims. A patent caveat was an official notice of intention to file a patent application at a later date. A caveat expired after one year, but could be renewed by paying an annual fee of $10.

Caveats were similar to provisional applications used today in the United States Patent and Trademark Office (USPTO) which also expire after one year. However, provisional applications today are non-renewable under any circumstances.

According to the Guide to the Practice of the Patent Office 1853, the primary objective of a caveat was to prevent the issuing of a rival patent for the same invention to a subsequent inventor. Before the issuing of a patent, the caveats filed within the preceding year were searched. If one was found for the same invention as the proposed patent, the Patent Office notified the holder of the caveat, who then had three months to submit a formal patent application with claims. If the two patent applications claimed the same invention, an interference would then be declared and neither patent could be issued until it was determined which was the first to invent.

== Cost ==
The filing fee of $10 for a caveat was less costly than the filing fee of $15 for a full patent application. As stated by the USPTO: "In 1861, the fee for obtaining a full patent was $35, of which $15 was to be paid at the time of application and $20 when the patent was granted. In 1922, the patent filing fee increased from $15 to $20." However the patent caveat fee remained $10 per year until the caveat system was abolished.

== See also ==
- Patent model
- Patent Office 1836 fire
- Patent Office 1877 fire
- United States Defensive Publication
- United States Statutory Invention Registration
