= IBM Technical Disclosure Bulletin =

The IBM Technical Disclosure Bulletin was a technical publication produced by IBM between 1958 and 1998. The purpose of the Bulletin was to disclose inventions that IBM did not want their competitors to get patents on. The Bulletin was a form of defensive publication. By publishing the details of how to make and use the invention, patent examiners could have a searchable source of prior art that they could cite against subsequent patent applications filed by others on the same or similar inventions.

The Bulletin has been cited over 48,000 times in various United States patents.

== See also ==
- Patent Commons Project
- United States Statutory Invention Registration
