= Patent Reform Act of 2007 =

The Patent Reform Act of 2007 (H.R. 1908, S. 1145) was a bill introduced in the 110th United States Congress to introduce changes in United States patent law. Democratic Congressman Howard Berman introduced the House of Representatives bill on April 18, 2007. Democratic Party Senator Patrick Leahy introduced the Senate bill on April 18, 2007. The bill passed the house but died in the Senate.

The bills broadly resembled the proposed Patent Reform Act of 2005 which would have enacted many of the proposals recommended by a 2003 report by the Federal Trade Commission and a 2004 report by the National Academy of Sciences. Similar acts were introduced as the Patent Reform Act of 2009 in the 111th Congress and as the America Invents Act in the 112th.

== Proposed changes in U.S. patent law ==
In certain respects, H.R. 1908 and S. 1145 would have made American patent law more similar to patent laws of many other countries. H.R. 1908 proposed the following changes in U.S. patent law:

=== Switch from first to invent to first to file ===
Regardless of which application arrives first, the United States was the only nation in the world in 2007 to give priority to the application that claims the earliest invention date. The first-to-invent system is thought to benefit small inventors, who may be less experienced with the patent application system. Critics of the first-to-file system also contend it would create a "race to the mailbox," and would result in sloppier, last-minute patent applications. However, the first-to-invent system requires the United States Patent and Trademark Office (USPTO) to undertake lengthy and complicated "interference" proceedings to try to determine who invented something first when claims conflict. The first-to-file system, supporters contend, would inject much-needed certainty into the patent application process. Finally, because every other country is on a first-to-file system, supporters claim that the majority of patent applicants and attorneys are already operating on a first-to-file basis.

=== Damages ===
The version of the bill that passed the House contained dramatic changes to the way damages are determined when a court determines that an accused infringer has indeed infringed. The bill specifically limited royalty recovery to the "economic value properly attributable to patent's specific contributions over the prior art,"—that is, the inventive portion of the claim, as opposed to the whole claim. The bill additionally required a detailed record to be created of the basis for determining damages, presumably for use during appeal procedures, and finally, the bill created new limitations on when the whole market value of an infringing product was used as the royalty base.

=== Other proposed provisions ===
The bill would also have made the following changes:

- Defining "inventor" to include a joint inventor and coinventor.
- Revising procedures for patent interference disputes.
- Revising requirements for an inventor's oath or declaration to allow substitute statements in specified circumstances (e.g., death or disability) and supplemental and corrected statements.
- Allowing a third party assignee (other than the inventor) or a person with a proprietary interest to file a patent application.
- Modifying provisions relating to damages for patent infringement to:
  1. require a court to conduct an analysis of a patent's specific contribution over prior art;
  2. allow increased damages for willful patent infringement; and
  3. expand the prior user defense.
- Renaming the Board of Patent Appeals as the Patent Trial and Appeal Board. (Also, revising provisions relating to the Board's composition, duties, and authorities).
- Establishing an administrative procedure at the USPTO allowing a person who is not the patent owner to challenge the validity of an issued patent (post-grant review). Would also set forth procedures for the consideration of such petitions, including provisions to prevent harassment of patent owners and abuse of process.
- Allowing third parties to submit documents relevant to the examination of a patent application.
- With respect to infringement litigation, revising venue requirements to allow actions to be brought in the judicial district where either party resides (in 2007, allowed only where the defendant resides) or where the corporation has its principal place of business or was incorporated.
- Banning tax planning patents.
- Preventing enforcement of patents covering digital check collection against financial institutions, such as those owned by DataTreasury.

== Status ==
The House version of the bill passed; the Senate version failed to pass in the 110th Congress. On September 4, 2007 the United States House Committee on the Judiciary reported the bill H.R. 1908, as amended, with the recommendation that it be passed by the House. The House passed the bill by a vote of 220-175 on September 7, 2007. It was favored among Democrats (160 ayes, 58 noes) and disfavored among Republicans (60 ayes, 117 noes). The Senate Committee on the Judiciary marked up the bill on June 16, 2007 and ordered the bill reported. The report, S. Rpt. 110-259, was issued on January 24, 2008. The bill stalled and Senate Majority Leader Harry Reid removed it from consideration.

== Reactions and lobbying ==
- American Institute of Certified Public Accountants supported the provision banning patents on tax planning methods.
- Business Software Alliance indicated that it supported the bill because it provided "provisions to improve patent quality; ensure equitable and fair remedies for patent infringement; give the U.S. Patent and Trademark Office greater resources to process a growing number of complex patent applications; and harmonize the American system with those of other major patent-granting nations."
- Coalition for Patent Fairness which is a group of IT companies like Apple, Google, Intel, Microsoft, Cisco, Dell, HP, Micron, Oracle, and Symantec, favored limitations on damage for infringement.
- Electronic Frontier Foundation favored limitations on damage for infringement.
- The United States Department of Commerce opposed the bill "in its entirety" due to the provisions limiting damages for infringement and stated that if those sections were not revised, "the resulting harm to a reasonably well-functioning U.S. intellectual property system would outweigh all the bill's useful reforms." However the USDOC supported the bill's provisions directed to the improvement of patent quality, beginning at the application stage.
- AFLCIO, United Steel Workers, Change To Win Labor Federation, and other unions or groups that favor unions - including POPA, the union of US patent examiners - lobbied against the bill, characterizing it as weakening the rights of patent holders which would in turn stifle American innovation and contribute to the outsourcing of U.S. jobs to other nations.
- Several conservative groups, including American Family Association, and Eagle Forum lobbied against the bill on the basis that it undermined "America's historically strong intellectual property rights...for the benefit of one economic sector, large IT firms, to the detriment of almost every other industrial, service, and financial sector of the economy"
- The Biotechnology Industry Organization lobbied against the bill, since the biotechnology industry relies heavily on strong patent rights.
- Coalition for 21st Century Patent Reform, favored several provisions but opposed the bill that passed the House because of the damages section.
- IEEE, which represents engineers and the Innovation Alliance, which represents entrepreneurs, and the National Small Business Association opposed the Act because they viewed it as weakening the rights of inventors and small business.
- National Association of Patent Practitioners characterized the bill as containing an "anti-patent wish-list" and opposed it for weakening the patent system. They also noted that the bill would make it easier to challenge the validity of a patent on the basis of inequitable conduct, a point of concern for patent attorneys.
- Professional Inventors Alliance, PIAUSA.ORG

=== International reaction ===
Yongshun Cheng, former Deputy Director of the IP Division of the Beijing High People's Court, has criticized the bill as being hypocritical. He asserts that the US should not be weakening the rights of US patent holders at the same time it is pressuring the Chinese government to strengthen the rights of Chinese patent holders.

The Indian Pharmaceutical Alliance has pointed out that the provisions of the bill which allow for the validity of a US patent to be challenged shortly after the patent issues, could favor Indian generic drug manufacturers by lowering the cost and legal risks associated with challenging drug patents of questionable validity.

== See also ==
- Patent Reform Act of 2005
- Patent Reform Act of 2009
