= Winans v. Denmead =

- Supreme Court of the United States

Argued January 16, 1854 Decided February 9, 1854
- Full case name: Winans v. Denmead
- Citations: 56 U.S. 330 (more)

Holding
- Established the doctrine of equivalents: Even if the challenged device is not literally within the claims of the prior art's patent, the challenged device infringes if it arrives at the same result in the same way.

Court membership
- Chief Justice Roger B. Taney Associate Justices John McLean · James M. Wayne; John Catron · Peter V. Daniel; Samuel Nelson · Robert C. Grier; Benjamin R. Curtis · John A. Campbell

Case opinions
- Majority: Curtis, joined by McLean, Wayne, Nelson, Grier
- Dissent: Taney, Catron, Daniel
- Dissent: Campbell

Winans v. Denmead, 56 U.S. 330 (1854), was a United States Supreme Court case in which the court established the doctrine of equivalents. It held that, even if the challenged device is not literally within the claims of the prior art's patent, the challenged device infringes if it arrives at the same result in the same way.

== Background ==
Winans sued Denmead in the Circuit Court of the United States for the District of Maryland for an infringement of his patent in "an improvement in cars for the transportation of coal," granted on June 26, 1847. The case was decided there in favor of Denmead. Winans appealed to the Supreme Court on a writ of error.

== Opinion of the court ==
The Supreme Court was argued at the Supreme Court on January 16, 1854. The court issued an opinion on February 9, 1854. The majority was concerned with treating the earlier inventor fairly in the face of unscrupulous infringers. The dissent by Campbell was concerned about the negative effects of construing patents as broader than their text. Justices Taney, Catron, and Daniel dissented without a separate opinion.

== Later developments ==
The doctrine of equivalents continues to be good law. It has been considered in numerous cases since Winans, including Consolidated Safety-Valve Co. v. Crosby Steam Gauge & Valve Co. (1885), which upheld a patent on a subsequent invention that was substantially similar to prior art because the subsequent invention was practically valuable and adopted widely, whereas the prior art was not so successful. In later cases, courts clarified that there must be some "nexus" between the commercial success of the product and the patented subject matter for that sort of claim to survive the doctrine of equivalents.
