= Large and small entities in patent law =

United States patent law

In United States patent law, those applying for a patent, i.e. applicants, and patentees may claim a particular status depending on the number of their employees. The fees to be paid to the patent office depend on the applicant's status. The statuses include the "large entity" status and the "small entity" status. The "micro entity" status is a further status, which was introduced with the Leahy–Smith America Invents Act (AIA), enacted in 2011.

The small entity status allows small businesses, independent inventors, nonprofit organizations to file a patent application and maintain an issued patent for a reduced fee—a 60% reduction. Under 13 C.F.R. § 121.802(a), an entity qualifies as a "small business concern", and so qualifies for small entity status, if its number of employees, including affiliates, does not exceed 500 persons. Small Business Administration (SBA) regulations, discussed below, define "employees" and "affiliates".

If an organization or individual qualifies for small entity status, the person seeking such status needs to file a verified statement in the patent application prior to paying the first fee as a small entity. Any subsequent payments only need to include a statement where such status has changed.

The concept of "small entity" also exist in other jurisdictions, such as in Canada.

== Employees ==
An entity, including its affiliates, may have up to 500 employees before being disqualified for small-entity status. Federal regulations define what persons qualify as employees and over what time periods employee counts are made.

All individuals employed on a full-time, part-time, or other basis are counted in determining a business concern's number of employees. This includes employees obtained from a temporary employee agency, professional employee organization or leasing concern. The totality of the circumstances, including criteria used by the IRS for Federal income tax purposes, are considered in determining whether individuals are employees of a concern. Volunteers (i.e., individuals who receive no compensation, including no in-kind compensation, for work performed) are not considered employees.

Part-time and temporary employees are counted the same as full-time employees. Where the number of employees fluctuates over the course of a year, the number of employees may be taken to be the average number of employees over the preceding 12 calendar months. The average number of employees of a business concern with affiliates is calculated by adding the average number of employees of the business concern with the average number of employees of each affiliate. If a concern has acquired an affiliate or been acquired as an affiliate during the applicable period of measurement or before the date on which it self-certified as small, the employees counted in determining size status include the employees of the acquired or acquiring concern. Furthermore, this aggregation applies for the entire period of measurement, not just the period after the affiliation arose. The employees of a former affiliate are not counted if affiliation ceased before the date used for determining size. This exclusion of employees of a former affiliate applies during the entire period of measurement, rather than only for the period after which affiliation ceased.

== Affiliates and control ==
Small business concerns as defined by federal regulations for the purposes of receiving small-entity discounts on patent fees may have a maximum of 500 employees, including affiliates. Thus, a business concern that might otherwise qualify for small-entity status might be disqualified if it is affiliated with one or more other business concerns that cumulatively have more than 500 employees. Affiliation is determined under a control test. Concerns are "affiliates" of each other for the purposes of 13 C.F.R. § 121.802(a) when one concern controls or has the power to control the other, or a third party or parties controls or has the power to control both. It does not matter whether control is exercised, so long as the power to control exists.

The test for determining control takes in account ownership, management, previous relationships with or ties to another concern, and contractual relationships. The federal regulations that describe control set out a number of circumstances where control obviously exists, as where one entity owns more than 50% of the stock in another entity, or where one or more officers, directors, managing members, or partners who control the board of directors and/or management of one concern also control the board of directors or management of one or more other concerns.

There are also a number of "safe-harbor" exceptions to affiliation coverage found in 13 C.F.R. § 121.103(b), mostly involving ownership by certain kinds of investment companies, venture capital operating companies, Indian tribes, § 501(c) nonprofits like charitable trusts, foundations, endowments, etc.

If the assignee of a patent application has difficulty determining for itself whether it qualifies for small-entity status, authorized SBA officials may make formal entity size determinations, based upon a specific patent application pursuant to USPTO rules. Such determinations, which may be thought of as analogous to a private letter ruling issued by the IRS to resolve questions relating to federal taxation, are binding upon the parties. Other SBA opinions provided to patent applicants or others are only advisory, and are not binding or appealable.

== Effect of initial status determination during pendency of application ==
Once a good faith determination of small entity status has been made and appropriately established with the USPTO, the lower small entity fees may be paid in the application without regard to change in status until the issue fee or maintenance fee is due. In practical terms, this rule relieves applicants and their representatives of the burdensome duty to constantly reevaluate the determination of an application's assignee organization(s)' small entity status(es) throughout the pendency of the application up to and until the issue fee is paid.

== Loss of status ==
Small entity status is lost when the patent is licensed, exclusively or non-exclusively, or assigned to an organization that would not itself qualify for small entity status.

If an organization (including affiliates) has fewer than 500 employees, an application data sheet may be filed, the box as a small entity may be checked, and subsequently the small entity fees may be paid until the patent is allowed or a maintenance fee on a resulting patent is due. At those points in time, the patent agent or attorney might need to send a notification of loss of small entity status.

== Micro entity status ==
Changes to U.S. patent law in December 2012 created a sub-category of small entity status called "micro entity status" for inventors who qualify for small entity status, but also have a gross income less than three times the current gross median income and have applied for no more than four patents previously, or who have an association with an institution of higher education.

== Misrepresentation penalties and consequences ==
Misrepresenting a firm's size status can result in suspension or disbarment, as well as civil and criminal penalties. Moreover, all claims of a patent issued following an intentional misrepresentation of small entity status may be held to be unenforceable as the result of inequitable conduct, i.e., fraud upon the United States Patent and Trademark Office. As long as any small-entity assertions are made without any intent to deceive, any improper assertion of small-entity status should not be considered fraud.
