= United States Defensive Publication =

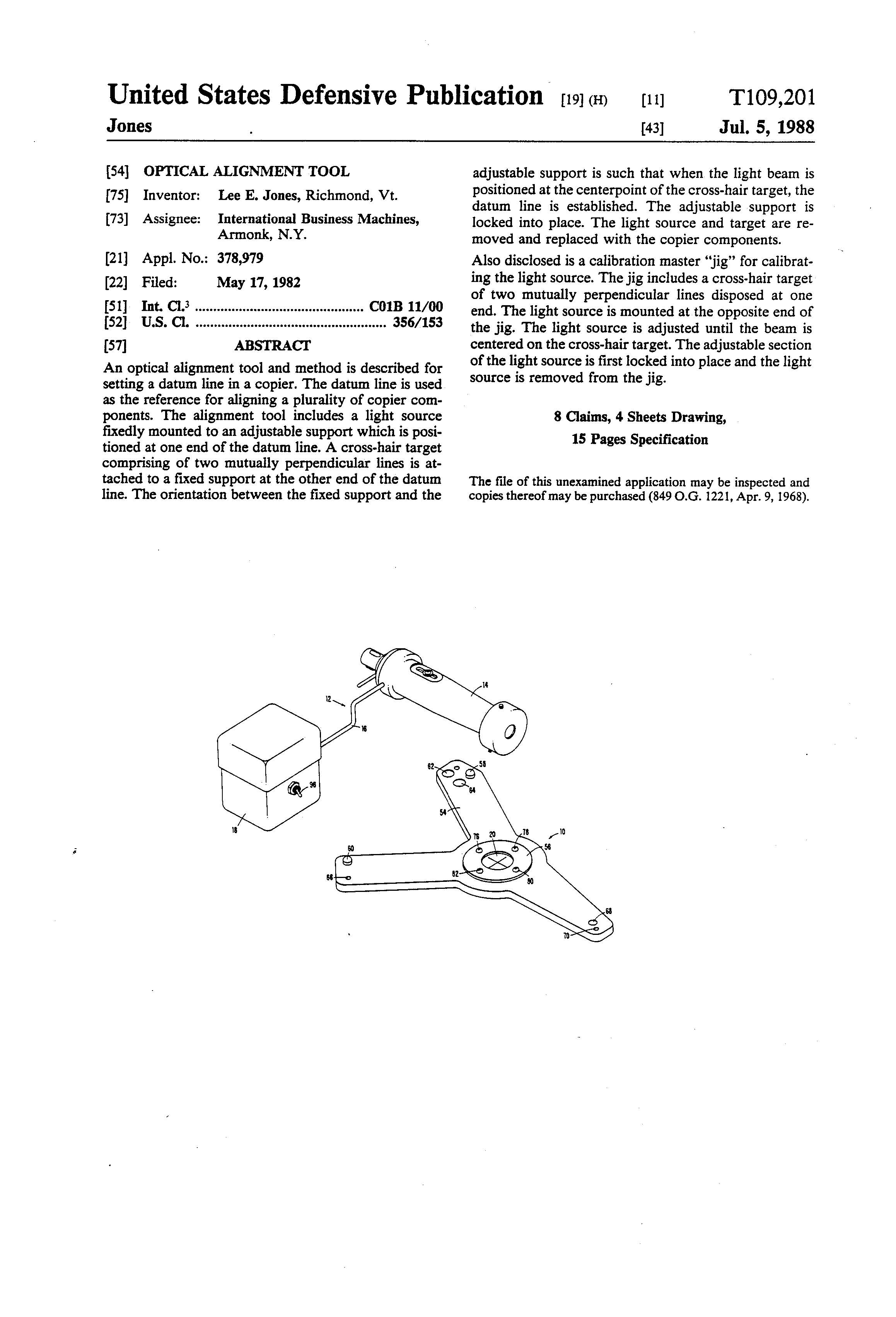
Example of United States Defensive Publication

A United States Defensive Publication is a published patent application for which the inventor has elected not to get patent coverage. Defensive Publications were made between April 1968 and May 8, 1985. The program, called Defensive Publication Program, was replaced by the statutory invention registration program, which itself was discontinued after the Leahy-Smith America Invents Act (AIA) entered into force in 2013.

US Defensive Publications can be searched in the United States Patent and Trademark Office's (USPTO) patent search web page. They are designated by a "T" in the publication number, the letter "T" referring to "Technical disclosure".

Defensive publications may be cited as prior art against patent applications, but only as of their publication dates. This is in contrast to statutory invention registrations, which are prior art as of their filing dates in the same manner as U.S. patents. However, a defensive publication may be the subject of an interference proceeding for five years from its earliest effective U.S. filing date.

== See also ==
- Defensive publication
- Patent caveat
- United States Statutory Invention Registration
