= Novelty (patent) =

Concept in patent law

Novelty is one of the patentability requirements for a patent claim, whose purpose is to prevent issuing patents on known things, i.e. to prevent public knowledge from being taken away from the public domain.

An invention is anticipated (i.e. not new) and therefore not patentable if it was known to the public before the priority date of the patent application. Although the concept of "novelty" in patent law appears simple and self-explanatory, this view is very far from reality. Some of the most contentious questions of novelty comprise:

1. inventor's own prior disclosures (only a few countries provide a grace period, most notably, 1 year in the US);
2. new uses of known things, such as pharmaceuticals;
3. a broader question of (2) is inherent anticipation;
4. patenting things, which are newly discovered in (or isolated from) nature (see Association for Molecular Pathology v. Myriad Genetics, Inc.) This question overlaps with patentable subject matter.

== Definition ==
Novelty is requirement for a patent claim to be patentable. In contrast, if an invention was known to the public before filing a patent application, or before its date of priority, if the priority of an earlier patent application is claimed, the invention is not considered new and therefore not patentable.

To assess the novelty of an invention, a search through what is called the prior art is usually performed, the term "art" referring to the relevant technical field. A prior art search is generally performed with a view to proving that the invention is "not new" or old. No search can possibly cover every single publication or use on earth, and therefore cannot prove that an invention is "new". A prior art search may for instance be performed using a keyword search of large patent databases, scientific papers and publications, and on any web search engine. However, it is impossible to guarantee the novelty of an invention, even once a patent has been granted, since some little known publication may have disclosed the claimed invention.

== Rationale ==
A patent grants an inventor a legally enforceable monopoly over their invention. This means that others can be legally restrained from exploiting the invention. It is not the intention of the patent system to deny anyone what they have been free to do before someone claims an invention. For example, one cannot patent the wheel, as that would exclude others from doing what they had previously been free to do. The legal test is that the invention must be something new, i.e. it must possess "novelty". The invention of the wheel is not new, because the wheel already forms part of the prior art.

== Specific concepts ==
=== Unauthorised disclosures ===
In most countries, a public disclosure of the invention invalidates any subsequently-filed patent application on the same invention, unless priority under the Paris Convention is claimed from an earlier application (which must itself have been filed before the date of any public disclosure). However, some countries and regions provide a grace period for an inventor (or their successor in title) to file a valid application after a public disclosure which was unauthorised by them, and was in breach of their rights. Typically the grace period is 6 or 12 months. The EPO, China and Russia provide a 6-month period, whereas the US and Japan provide 12 months.

In the EPO, a grace period of 6 months is provided for filing a European patent application after a disclosure which was made "due to, or in consequence of, an evident abuse in relation to the applicant or his legal predecessor". It is settled law that the European patent application itself must be filed within that 6-month period; it is not enough for the date of filing of an earlier priority application (the priority date) to be within that period. Consequently, after an unauthorised disclosure, the inventor has only 6 months rather than the usual 12 permitted under the Paris Convention to file a European patent application.

In the US, no distinction is made between authorised and unauthorised disclosures made by or obtained from the inventor. In both cases, a valid US patent application can be filed by the inventor up to 12 months following such disclosure.

=== Novelty in a discovery of a product of nature ===
Another controversial issue in novelty analysis is whether a discovery and isolation of a product of nature should be patentable. In 1911, Billings Learned Hand, who had been only 2 years in his position as a judge, "had made an uninformed mistake in Parke-Davis v. Mulford" by pronouncing that naturally occurring adrenaline can be patented in its pure form. This judicial tradition, allowing patenting of isolated natural products in the US, continued for over 100 years. Another notable example of it was In re Bergstrom, where a court reversed the Patent Office’s refusal to patent on prostaglandins. In Amgen, Inc. v. Chugai Pharmaceutical Co. (1991) and Schering Corp. v. Amgen Inc (2000), courts confirmed patentability of recombinant DNA molecules, which encode known proteins.

The practice of patenting isolated products of nature came to an end only in 2013, when the SCOTUS decided in Association for Molecular Pathology v. Myriad Genetics, Inc. that an isolated product of Nature (a DNA sequence in that case) does not deserve a composition-of-matter claim. At the same time, the Court decided that complementary DNA, which is produced by reverse transcription of messenger RNA and does not contain introns, can be patentable. It is worth noting, that the denial of patentability in this case was not based on novelty, but rather on subject matter eligibility.

=== Anticipation ===
Anticipation refers to advance use or disclosure of an otherwise-patentable invention, thereby undermining its novelty. The United Kingdom's House of Lords referred to "anticipation" as "convenient" terminology to cover "that part of the state of art which is inconsistent with the invention being new". Anticipation and infringement are two sides of the same coin: that which anticipates earlier in time would infringe later in time.

=== Point of novelty ===
Point of novelty is a term used in patent law to distinguish those elements or limitations in a patent claim that are conventional or known from those elements or limitations that are novel, i.e. not conventional or known. That part of the invention may also be termed its "point of departure from the prior art". The term is also applied to a patentability test – the point of novelty test – which determines patentability (usually, obviousness) by considering the point(s) of novelty after dissecting out the conventional part.

In a Jepson claim, the conventional parts of the claim elements are placed in a preamble, such as "In a grease gun comprising a cylinder enclosing a piston longitudinally movable in said cylinder, said cylinder having a nozzle at a distal end thereof", which is followed by a transitional phrase such as "the improvement comprising", which is followed by a recitation of the element or elements constituting the point of novelty, such as "said nozzle having a fluted opening at a distal end thereof".

A conceptual problem may arise in applying the point of novelty method of analysis when the elements at the point of novelty cooperate or co-act with the conventional elements or part of them in a novel way. The novel co-action is properly considered part of the point of novelty of the invention and should therefore properly be recited after the transitional phrase.

The United States Court of Appeals for the Federal Circuit formerly used the point of novelty test for design patents as the basis of a patent infringement analysis, but the court recently abandoned that test in Egyptian Goddess, Inc. v. Swisa, Inc. The Federal Circuit has at times criticized use of the point of novelty test in obviousness analysis, but the Supreme Court has continued to use a point of novelty test for obviousness. In Parker v. Flook the Supreme Court analyzed patent-eligibility (statutory subject matter) under a point of novelty test, citing Neilson v. Harford and O'Reilly v. Morse as authority, but in Diamond v. Diehr, the Court used the opposite approach. Then in Mayo v. Prometheus and Alice v. CLS Bank the Supreme Court went back to the test of the Flook case.

Present-day American patent law still acknowledges that some parts of a patent claim may constitute "insignificant post-solution activity". This is regarded as a kind of "point of novelty" approach, disallowed under present (Federal Circuit) patent law. To combat infringement, truly "insignificant" elements are routinely kept out of patent claims. The purpose of the patent-eligibility doctrine concerning insignificant post-solution activity, however, is that adding such limitations to a claim does not involve adding an "inventive concept" to the otherwise ineligible underlying idea.

The "contribution approach" in European patent law is similar to the American "point of novelty" approach. It is supposed to be invalid, but it is still being applied under various guises in order to avoid counter-intuitive results.

== Jurisdictions ==
=== Canada ===
In Canada, the requirements for novelty are codified under section 28.2 of the Patent Act (R.S.C., 1985, c. P-4):

28.2 (1) The subject-matter defined by a claim in an application for a patent in Canada (the “pending application”) must not have been disclosed

(a) more than one year before the filing date by the applicant, or by a person who obtained knowledge, directly or indirectly, from the applicant, in such a manner that the subject-matter became available to the public in Canada or elsewhere;
(b) before the claim date by a person not mentioned in paragraph (a) in such a manner that the subject-matter became available to the public in Canada or elsewhere;
(c) in an application for a patent that is filed in Canada by a person other than the applicant, and has a filing date that is before the claim date;
...

The section does not restrict disclosure to prior patents, giving a broad description of what includes prior disclosure; so long as the subject-matter was disclosed “in such manner that the subject-matter became available to the public”, the subject-matter is barred from being patented. This may include prior patents, publications or the invention itself being put on display. Disclosures in a private document, such as an internal memo that is not available to the public, do not count.

There is an eight-pronged test to determine whether anticipation occurs in Canada. The prior art must:

1. give an exact prior description;
2. give directions which will inevitably result in something within the claims;
3. give clear and unmistakable directions;
4. give information which for the purpose of practical utility is equal to that given by the subject patent;
5. convey information so that a person grappling with the same problem must be able to say "that gives me what I wish";
6. give information to a person of ordinary knowledge so that he must at once perceive the invention;
7. in the absence of explicit directions, teach an "inevitable result" which "can only be proved by experiments"; and
8. satisfy all these tests in a single document without making a mosaic.

The current test now requires that only 1 of the 8 tests be fulfilled in order to find anticipation.

=== European Patent Convention ===
Under the European Patent Convention (EPC), European patents shall be granted for inventions which, among other things, are new. The central legal provision governing the novelty under the EPC is Article 54 EPC.

=== United States ===
In the United States the four most common ways in which an inventor will be barred under Section 102 are:

1. by making the invention known or allowing the public to use the invention; or
2. having the invention published in a fixed medium (such as in a patent, patent application, or journal article); or
3. if the invention was previously invented in the U.S. by another, who has not abandoned, suppressed, or concealed the invention, or
4. if the invention was described in a patent application filed by another, where the application later issues as a US patent.

In U.S. patent law, a claim lacks novelty, and anticipation occurs when one prior art reference or event discloses all the features of a claim and enables one of ordinary skill in the art to make and use the invention. The term "features" in this context refers to the elements of art of the claim or its limitations as explained in the all elements rule.

A prior art reference must not only disclose every feature of a claim, but must also disclose the features arranged or combined in the same way as the claim.

== See also ==
- Analytic dissection - concept analogous to Point of novelty, but in copyright law
- Disclaimer (patent)
- Doctrine of inherency
- World Intellectual Property Organization
