= Government patent use =

Government patent use law is a statute codified at 28 USC § 1498(a) that is a "form of government immunity from patent claims." Section 1498 gives the federal government of the United States the "right to use patented inventions without permission, while paying the patent holder 'reasonable and entire compensation' which is usually "set at ten percent of sales or less". This statute "allows federal agencies and thirdparty government contractors to manufacture and/or use any invention without authorization from the patent holder. The federal government's rights are without an obligation for prior negotiation." Although Congress has the right to waive sovereign immunity for alleged patent infringement claims under the 'government patent use' statute, there are limits to the patent holder's recourse in the United States Court of Federal Claims.

== Applications of section 1498 ==
Under the Patent and Trademark Law Amendments Act of 1980 (commonly known as the Bayh–Dole Act), patents granted on inventions developed with the use of government funds can be exclusively licensed to promote their commercialization, but the government retains the ability to 'march in" if the patented technology is not made available to the public on reasonable terms.

=== Night-vision goggles (1990s) ===
The United States Department of Defense began developing night-vision goggles in 1987. They purchased thousands for Operation Desert Storm alone. Gargoyles Inc. acquired the patent for protective eyewear from Pro-Tec Inc in 1988. They "commenced an action under 28 U.S.C. § 1498 for "reasonable and entire" compensation for direct infringement of the patent by the United States. Gargoyles lost their 1996 appeal.

=== Antibiotic ciprofloxacin (2001) ===
Faced with the threat of anthrax as a chemical weapon, Tommy Thompson, the 19th Secretary of United States Secretary of Health and Human Services (2001–2005), organized the stockpiling of the antidote – the antibiotic ciprofloxacin (brand name Cipro) – which was manufactured by Bayer AG. When Bayer refused to lower prices, Thompson threatened to invoke section 1498. In response Bayer guaranteed an adequate supply of Cipro at a 50 percent discount.

=== Software (2009) ===
The United States Department of the Treasury used it to "purchase software without regard to patents" held by Advanced Software Design Corporation. In Advanced Software Design Corp. v. Federal Reserve Bank of St. Louis, the court expanded the statute's interpretation to give immunity from liability to private companies as well as persons who are performing work on behalf of the government.

=== Green bullets (2014) ===
In 2010 the United States Army completed the development of a green bullet, the M855 A1, which was part of its lead-free initiative begun in the 1990s. Liberty Ammunition Inc sued the United States claiming they were the owners of the patent. The United States Department of Defense invoked section 1498.

=== Direct-acting antivirals (2015) ===
In a May 18, 2016, letter to Secretary Robert McDonald The United States Department of Veterans Affairs, Senator Bernie Sanders (I-VT) suggested that the Secretary "utilize federal law, specifically 28 USC § 1498, to break the patents on these drugs to authorize third parties to manufacture or import them for government use" through section 1498". to "address the funding shortfall that has resulted from the high demand for, and high cost of, direct-acting antivirals."

Amy Kapczynski, a Yale University law professor, and Aaron S. Kesselheim, Harvard Medical School associate professor of medicine, proposed that the federal government "invoke section 1498 to make important new high-cost therapies widely available to patients who need them." By July 2017, Louisiana's health secretary—Rebekah Gee—who described Louisiana as Americas's "public-health-crisis cradle", was investigating the use of the "government patent use" as a strategy, to make Sofosbuvir, manufactured by Gilead Sciences, a highly effective treatment for Hepatitis C which cost $84,000 for a treatment in 2016. Gilead's CEO John Martin has been questioned by the US Congress on the prohibitive pricing. Louisiana and other states were forced to ration Sofosbuvir by delaying treatment of Medicaid hepatitis patients until the liver presented more severe damage.
