= DataTreasury =

- Type: Private
- Founded: 1998
- Founder: Claudio Ballard
- Headquarters: Plano, Texas, United States
- Area served: USA, Canada
- Revenue: $350 million (2010)
- Number of employees: 2 (2010)
- Website: datatreasury.com

DataTreasury is an American fintech company. Located in Plano, Texas, the company develops, acquires and licenses technology for secure check image capture and storage. The company has a patent portfolio relating to these technologies, which it enforces.

== History ==
In 1998, Claudio Ballard founded DataTreasury in Melville, New York, with the intention to market electronic check processing and related payment-processing tools using patents prosecuted and filed prior to DataTreasury's founding. Patents were issued in 1999 and 2000.

According to Ballard, DataTreasury almost went out of business in late 2001.

In 2002, DataTreasury licensed their first imaging system, eImageVault, to Bank Hapoalim.

== Patent infringement suits ==
=== Ballard patents ===
In 2002, DataTreasury sued 56 banks and other companies, including JPMorgan Chase and First Data, for infringing the Ballard patents.

In 2003, the U.S. Congress passed the Check Clearing for the 21st Century Act, known as "Check 21". The act allows banks to take digital images of checks, exchange those images with other banks, and destroy the original paper copies.

By December 2004, two companies that DataTreasury had sued had settled. Affiliated Computer Services, a large information technology supplier, paid $50,000, and the RDM Corporation, a small Canadian company that sells hardware and software for payment processing, agreed to "pay a fee for each check imaging terminal it deploys and 'a per-click royalty for storage of electronic documents and check information, calculated at around a 50 percent royalty rate,'" according to a DataTreasury press release reported by The New York Times. In mid-2005, JPMorgan Chase settled their suit. The pending suits were put on hold pending the outcome of a reexamination of the patents (see below), but after the USPTO confirmed the validity of the patents, the cases moved forward.

The company relocated to Plano, Texas, in October 2005.

In November 2005, First Data filed a request for a reexamination of the DataTreasury Ballard patents, citing numerous earlier publications that it claimed either anticipated the DataTreasury inventions or made them obvious. In 2007, the USPTO upheld both patents and further allowed DataTreasury to claim additional inventions that were disclosed but not claimed in the original applications.

In August 2006, Merrill Lynch and DataTreasury settled their suit.

In 2007, the United States Senate version of the Patent Reform Act of 2007 (S. 1145) moved forward with an amendment to Section 14 of the Act, supported by a number of financial services companies, which would prevent DataTreasury from collecting damages on the patents. However, the Congressional Budget Office (CBO) predicted that if such a provision were passed, owners of check-processing patents (such as DataTreasury) would sue the federal government, arguing that their property had been unlawfully seized. The CBO estimated that the suit would have a high likelihood of success and that the government's liability from this lawsuit could reach $1 billion, to cover royalties of 5 cents per check, over the remaining life of the patents.

On March 26, 2010, a jury found that U.S. Bank, Viewpointe, and Clearing House Payments Company and its subsidiary, SVPCo, were guilty of infringing DataTreasury's patents. The jury entered a decision $26.6 million in damages and found that the infringement was willful. Because of the willful infringement finding, the trial judge doubled the damages.

=== WMR e-Pin patents ===
In February 2006, DataTreasury purchased four patents from WMR e-Pin, LLC. These patents were U.S. patent 5,265,007, U.S. patent 5,583,759, U.S. patent 5,717,868, and U.S. patent 5,930,778.

On February 24, 2006, DataTreasury filed an infringement suit with respect to these patents against 30 banks and other companies in the United States District Court for the Eastern District of Texas.

=== Settlements ===
The following banks and corporations have settled their lawsuits with DataTreasury and/or taken a license.

- Affiliated Computer Services
- Bank of New York Mellon Corp
- Bank One
- Citibank
- City National Corporation
- Compass Bancshares Inc.
- Diebold
- First Data
- First Tennessee Bank
- Groupe Ingenico
- Groupe Ingenico
- JP Morgan Chase
- Mellon Bank
- Merrill Lynch
- NCR
- PNC Financial Services

=== Other litigation ===
In April 2011, Ted Doukas sued DataTreasury claiming that he was a financial backer of Claudio Ballard when Ballard was working on the image capture technology and was therefore entitled to one half of the proceeds from the invention. The total amount sought was $15 billion. Doukas' claim was dismissed against DataTreasury (and its officers and directors) in May 2013. The case is currently pending appeal.

== Criticism ==
In 2004, The New York Times characterized DataTreasury as "a company whose only business, other than one client, appears to be suing other companies." The banking industry has accused DataTreasury of abusing the patent system by buying the patents they are enforcing. Former congressman Steve Bartlett said that DataTreasury's lawsuits are "an example of what's wrong with patent law", while Stephen Boyd characterized the company's lawyers as patent trolls.

DataTreasury has stated that Ballard is the inventor of the system and built the company to sell it before the banks stole the idea and nearly destroyed his business.
