= Doctrine of inherency =

In United States patent law, the doctrine of inherency holds that, under certain circumstances, prior art may be relied upon not only for what it expressly teaches, but also for what is inherent therein, i.e., what necessarily flows from the express teachings. For a patent claim to be valid, its subject-matter must be novel and non-obvious. The claim is anticipated (i.e. will fail because its subject-matter is not novel) if a single prior art reference, either expressly or inherently, discloses every feature of the claimed invention. The concept of inherency is predicated on the idea that a claim should not pass the test of anticipation merely because a feature of it is undisclosed or unrecognized in the prior art reference. A prior art source may thus still anticipate if an apparently missing element of the claim is inherent in that prior art source.

Procedurally, to rely on the doctrine of inherency, one must provide a basis in fact and/or technical reasoning supporting a determination that an allegedly inherent characteristic necessarily would be present if the teachings of the prior art were followed, even if the inherent feature would not have been recognized.

The fact that a certain result or characteristic may occur or be present in the prior art is not alone sufficient to establish the inherency of that result or characteristic. To establish inherency, the evidence must make clear that the missing matter is necessarily present in the prior art reference. Inherency may not be established by probabilities or possibilities.

Once the United States Patent and Trademark Office (USPTO) establishes that a product referenced in prior art appears to be substantially identical, the burden shifts to the applicant to show a non-obvious difference.

The doctrine of inherency is typically invoked when an inventor tries to obtain a product patent for a product that had been unintentionally invented earlier ("accidental anticipation").

The United States Supreme Court held in Tilghman v. Proctor that where the first, accidental producer was not aware of the product and did not attempt to produce it, the first production did not bar a patent on the subsequent "invention" of the product. 102 U.S. 707 (1880).

The use of the doctrine of inherency in a determination of obviousness is more complicated because "[t]hat which may be inherent is not necessarily known and that which is unknown cannot be obvious."

A patent applicant may use the doctrine of inherency to respond to a rejection for lack of an adequate written description by showing that the patent application inherently includes the disclosure that is allegedly lacking.
