= Stanford University v. Roche Molecular Systems, Inc. =

Stanford v. Roche
- Supreme Court of the United States

Argued February 28, 2011 Decided June 6, 2011
- Full case name: Board of Trustees of the Leland Stanford Junior University, Petitioner v. Roche Molecular Systems, Inc., et al.
- Docket no.: 09-1159
- Citations: 563 U.S. 776 (more) 131 S. Ct. 2188; 180 L. Ed. 2d 1; 2011 U.S. LEXIS 4183; 79 U.S.L.W. 4407; 98 U.S.P.Q.2d (BNA) 1761; 68 A.L.R. Fed. 2d 617; 22 Fla. L. Weekly Fed. S 1069

Case history
- Prior: 487 F. Supp. 2d 1099 (N.D. Cal. 2007); 563 F. Supp. 2d 1016 (N.D. Cal. 2008); affirmed in part, vacated in part, 583 F.3d 832 (Fed. Cir. 2009); cert. granted, 562 U.S. 1001 (2010).

Holding
- The Bayh-Dole Act does not automatically vest title to federally funded inventions in federal contractors or authorize contractors to unilaterally take title to such inventions.

Court membership
- Chief Justice John Roberts Associate Justices Antonin Scalia · Anthony Kennedy; Clarence Thomas · Ruth Bader Ginsburg; Stephen Breyer · Samuel Alito; Sonia Sotomayor · Elena Kagan

Case opinions
- Majority: Roberts, joined by Scalia, Kennedy, Thomas, Alito, Sotomayor, Kagan
- Concurrence: Sotomayor
- Dissent: Breyer, joined by Ginsburg

Laws applied
- Bayh–Dole Act, 35 U.S.C. §§ 200–212

Stanford University v. Roche Molecular Systems, Inc., 563 U.S. 776 (2011), was a United States Supreme Court case in which the Court held that title in a patented invention vests first in the inventor, even if the inventor is a researcher at a federally funded lab subject to the 1980 Bayh–Dole Act. The judges affirmed the common understanding of U.S. constitutional law that inventors originally own inventions they make, and contractual obligations to assign those rights to third parties are secondary.

== Background ==
To understand the case, a brief description of the dispute and of common understandings of ownership of inventions is required.

=== Dispute ===
The case arose from a dispute over patents covering diagnostic tests for HIV infection (U.S. Patent Nos. 5,968,730, 6,503,705, and 7,129,041), originally owned by Stanford University, and HIV diagnostic tests sold by Roche. When Stanford sued Roche for infringing the patents in 2005, Roche countered by claiming that it jointly owned the patents, due to an agreement that a Stanford faculty member, Dr. Mark Holodniy, signed in the late 1980s when he did research at Cetus, the biotechnology company that invented PCR and that was later acquired by Roche.

When Holodniy had joined the faculty of Stanford shortly before he had visited Cetus, he, like all scientific personnel at companies and research institutions, had signed an agreement in which he agreed that his employer would own any inventions he made. Stanford's agreement, in particular, stated that he "'agree[d] to assign' to Stanford his 'right, title and interest in' inventions resulting from his employment at the University."

The Stanford lab in which Holodniy worked had been working on developing better HIV tests, and wanted to try the new PCR method, so Holodniy's supervisor had arranged for him to work at Cetus to learn the technique. Under standard business practice, Cetus had Holodniy sign a confidentiality agreement before allowing him into their facilities. The particular agreement that Holodniy signed stated that Holodniy "will assign and do[es] hereby assign" to Cetus his "right, title and interest in each of the ideas, inventions and improvements" made "as a consequence of [his] access" to Cetus.

After completing his training at Cetus, Holodniy then returned to Stanford where he and other Stanford employees tested the HIV measurement technique. Over the next few years, Stanford obtained written assignments of rights from the Stanford employees, including Holodniy, and filed several patent applications related to the procedure. Stanford secured three patents to the HIV measurement process. Some of Stanford's research that was related to the HIV measurement technique was funded by the National Institutes of Health (NIH), thereby subjecting the invention to the Bayh–Dole Act. Accordingly, Stanford disclosed the invention to the government, granted the government a nonexclusive, nontransferable, paid-up license to use the patented procedure, and formally notified NIH that it elected to retain title to the invention.

=== Ownership of inventions ===
The U.S. Constitution grants inventors ownership of inventions they make under the Copyright Clause which grants Congress the authority "to promote the Progress of Science and useful Arts, by securing for limited Times to Authors and Inventors the exclusive Right to their respective Writings and Discoveries." However, for inventors who are employed, complications ensue. In the absence of a written agreement, under common law an employee will own an invention he or she makes, unless the employee was hired specifically to invent and provided means and direction to make the invention. However, companies and universities that hire scientists to conduct research obligate their employees to sign contracts in which inventions are assigned to the employer, and these contracts – as all contracts not involving the federal government – are governed by state laws.

When the employer itself contracts with third parties, those contracts may also create obligations with respect to intellectual property invented by employees. Especially in fee-for-service contract research, assignment of inventions from the contract research organization (CRO) to the sponsor is common. Therefore, the inventor could either first assign his or her invention to the CRO, which would in turn assign it to the sponsor, or for the sake of simplicity, the CRO employee could assign directly to the sponsor. Before the Bayh–Dole Act was passed in 1980, research grants and contracts issued by the US government often obligated recipient institutions and companies to assign inventions to the US government, and scientists generally directly assigned inventions to the US government. The Bayh–Dole Act changed this; the specific language of the statute is: "Each nonprofit organization or small business firm (that receives a federal grant) may... elect to retain title to any subject invention" and also: "If a contractor does not elect to retain title to a subject invention in cases subject to this section, the Federal agency may consider and after consultation with the contractor grant requests for retention of rights by the inventor subject to the provisions of this Act and regulations promulgated hereunder." It is this specific language upon which Stanford would rely in its dispute with Roche.

== District Court case ==
In 2005, the Board of Trustees of the Leland Stanford Junior University filed suit against Roche Molecular Systems, Inc., alleging that Roche's HIV detection kits were infringing the three patents. Roche argued, that it had acquired rights to the patents, when it purchased Cetus, and pleaded the ownership theory in three forms: (i) as a declaratory judgment counterclaim; (ii) as an affirmative defense; and (iii) as a challenge to Stanford's standing to sue for infringement. The district court held, that Roche's counterclaim for ownership of the patents was barred by California statutes of limitation.

Stanford also argued, that it had a "right of second refusal" to the patents subject to the Government's right of first refusal, under 35 U.S.C. § 202(d) of the Bayh–Dole Act as described above. The district court agreed with Stanford, holding that Holodniy could only keep title to his inventions "[i]f a contractor does not elect to retain title to a subject invention." However, the district court also held that the patent claims were invalid for obviousness.

Both parties appealed.

== Federal Circuit case ==
The Federal Circuit agreed with the district court that Roche's ownership counterclaim was barred by the California statutes of limitation, but held that the affirmative defense of ownership was not barred, and that "questions of standing can be raised at any time and are not foreclosed by, or subject to, statutes of limitation." The court then determined that Cetus (and therefore Roche) had in fact acquired rights to the three patents due to the agreement that Holodniy had signed with Cetus.

Citing two prior Federal Circuit cases, the court held that the language "agree to assign" in the agreement that Stanford had Holodniy sign, was merely a promise to assign his invention rights to Stanford at some undetermined future point. Also, when Holodniy signed the contract, Stanford's Administrative Guide to "Inventions, Patents, and Licensing" stated that: "[u]nlike industry and many other universities, Stanford's invention rights policy allows all rights to remain with the inventor if possible." And with respect to the Cetus contract, the Federal Circuit interpreted the contract language "do hereby assign" to be "a present assignment of Holodniy's future inventions to Cetus," thereby giving Cetus immediate rights in Holodniy's future inventions. By the time Holodniy executed an assignment to Stanford three years later with respect to the patent applications that Stanford filed, his rights had already transferred to Cetus and the subsequent assignment was void. The Court found that Stanford itself received constructive notice of Cetus's ownership rights at least through Holodniy's employment by Stanford—in other words, Holodniy's knowledge of the Cetus agreement was imputed to his employer. The Court also found that Stanford had similar constructive notice through Holodniy's supervisor, who directed Holodniy to work with Cetus and executed agreements of his own that transferred intellectual property rights to Cetus. Although Stanford asserted that Holodniy signed the agreement with Cetus solely on his own behalf, not Stanford's, the Court found that this argument missed the point. According to the Court, the agreement with Cetus indicates that Holodniy was acting as an independent contractor with respect to Cetus, not with respect to Stanford, and that “Holodniy [had] signed away his individual rights as an inventor, not Stanford’s.”

With respect to Stanford's claims about the Bayh–Dole Act, the Federal Circuit overruled the District Court decision, holding that the Act does not void an otherwise valid prior transfer of rights. As a result, Stanford was entitled to only those rights that remained after the Government declined to exercise its option.

According to the Court, Stanford therefore lacked standing to sue Roche, the district court lacked jurisdiction over Stanford's infringement claim, and the district court should not have addressed the validity of the patents. Accordingly, the Court vacated the district court's finding of invalidity and remanded the case for dismissal due to lack of standing.

Stanford appealed to the Supreme Court based on its argument that Bayh-Dole overrides normal ownership of inventions.

== Supreme Court case ==
In November 2010 the Supreme Court agreed to hear the case. The case was decided on June 6, 2011. The decision was "largely moot" as the majority, led by Chief Justice Roberts, held that U.S. patent rights have always (since 1790) initially vested in "the inventor" and that the non-specific language of the Bayh–Dole Act does nothing to change the original setup.

== Effects ==
The effects on patent law were negligible: "The Supreme Court’s grant of certiorari for this case came as a surprise to many intellectual property attorneys who did not believe that the Bayh–Dole Act changed the centuries old proposition that inventors originally have rights in their patents. As a result, the Supreme Court’s decision certainly reassured inventors, as well as all those involved in the practice of law involving inventions, that their longstanding belief that the ownership rights in inventions belong first and foremost to inventors is correct."

As the case unfolded, it was clear that the problems arose because of Stanford's "failure to negotiate a tight assignment agreement with its researchers and scientists" and further that the simple solution would be to have existing university employees agree to a new, more explicit and immediately effective assignment agreement and have all new employees sign such agreements. Universities including MIT and Stanford have done so. The universities have become more aggressive in claiming ownership of faculty inventions, depriving the faculty members of rights over their intellectual properties. Often, faculty members have little-to-no bargaining power and are forced to give up the rights to their inventions.
