= American Inventors Protection Act =

American Inventors Protection Act of 1999
- Long title: An Act to provide for patent reform, and for other purposes.
- Enacted by: the 106th United States Congress

Citations
- Public law: Pub. L. 106-113
- Statutes at Large: 113 Stat. 1501

Legislative history
- Introduced in the House as H.R. 3194 by Frank Wolf on November 2, 1999; Signed into law by President Bill Clinton on November 29, 1999

The American Inventors Protection Act (AIPA) is a United States federal law enacted on November 29, 1999, as Public Law 106-113. In 2002, the Intellectual Property and High Technology Technical Amendments Act of 2002, Public Law 107-273, amended AIPA.

AIPA contains significant changes to American Patent Law. AIPA added

- An "earlier invention" defense for business method patents – 35 U.S.C. §273;
- Publication of US patent applications for foreign published applications – 35 U.S.C. §122;
- Patent term restoration for delays caused by the Patent and Trademark Office – 35 U.S.C. §154;
- The Request for Continued Examination (RCE) patent prosecution procedure; and
- Disclosure requirements for invention promotion firms.

== Political considerations ==
Large corporations generally supported the bill. Independent inventors generally opposed the bill.

== See also ==
- Patent Reform Act of 2005
