= O'Donoghue v. United States =

- Supreme Court of the United States

Argued April 12, 1933 Decided May 29, 1933
- Full case name: Daniel W. O'Donoghue v. The United States; William Hitz v. The United States
- Citations: 289 U.S. 516 (more)

Holding
- Courts in the District of Columbia judiciary can be both Article III courts and Article I tribunals at the same time.

Court membership
- Chief Justice Charles E. Hughes Associate Justices Willis Van Devanter · James C. McReynolds; Louis Brandeis · George Sutherland; Pierce Butler · Harlan F. Stone; Owen Roberts · Benjamin N. Cardozo

Case opinions
- Majority: Sutherland, joined by McReynolds, Brandeis, Sutherland, Butler, Stone, Roberts
- Dissent: Hughes, Van Devanter, and Cardozo

Laws applied
- Compensation Clause

O'Donoghue v. United States (consolidated with Hitz v. United States), 289 U.S. 516 (1933), was a United States Supreme Court case in which the court held that courts in the District of Columbia judiciary can be both Article III courts and Article I tribunals at the same time. The two courts at issue in O'Donoghue were a court of general jurisdiction called the Supreme Court of the District of Columbia (now the U.S. District Court for the District of Columbia) (Note: Because the District Court is now exclusively an Article III court, it is no longer a court of general jurisdiction. It is a court of limited jurisdiction.) and a court of appellate jurisdiction called the Court of Appeals of the District of Columbia (now the U.S. Court of Appeals for the D.C. Circuit). (Note: The modern D.C. Circuit is an appellate court for federal law. It has nothing to do with the District's modern appellate court for local law now called the District of Columbia Court of Appeals.)

When O'Donoghue was decided, these courts handled cases arising under either federal or local law. However, an Article III court cannot have jurisdiction over cases that arise under local law. These courts also had extra, non-judicial duties conferred upon them outside of Article III. As such, these courts were widely understood to be legislative courts organized under Article I and not constitutional courts organized under Article III. O'Donoghue allowed these courts to be Article III courts despite that constitutional contradiction by announcing that they were a unique hybrid of Article III court and Article I tribunal.

In 1970, Congress split the duties of these two courts among four adjudicative bodies: two to handle local law and two to handle federal law. The local-law cases are handled by Article I tribunals. The federal-law cases are handled by Article III courts, the same courts that were at issue in O'Donoghue. No hybrid courts like the ones approved of in O'Donoghue currently exist.

== Background ==
=== Legal precedent ===
==== Constitutional courts and legislative courts ====
A constitutional court is organized under Article III of the Constitution to exercise "the judicial power of the United States." An Article III court must meet the requirements of Article III to have jurisdiction over the cases that may be heard under Article III. That is, the Article III judges must have life tenure under the Good Behavior Clause, and the Compensation Clause requires that their wages never be reduced while they are in office. That said, Article III jurisdiction is limited jurisdiction, and a case can only be heard by an Article III court if it falls under at least one category of that limited jurisdiction. Those categories are defined by Congress and cannot exceed the boundaries of the judicial power described in Article III, Section 2. Federal question jurisdiction is a category of Article III jurisdiction, and it allows an Article III court to take cases that arise under federal law. That kind of jurisdiction does not allow an Article III court to hear cases that arise under local laws from a state or territory.

On the other hand, Congress has the power to create legislative courts to adjudicate disputes related to its other powers under the Constitution, such as those provided under Article I or Article IV. The legislative court's purpose is limited to the exercise of that congressional power. A legislative court can have concurrent jurisdiction over at least some of the matters covered by Article III, but its powers need not be limited to Article III jurisdiction because its powers are not derived from Article III. However, a legislative court does not have access to the judicial power of the United States, and the judges of a legislative court are not required to have the protections of either the Good Behavior Clause or the Compensation Clause from Article III. That is, Congress may create legislative courts where the judges may be removed, and Congress may lower the salaries of those judges at any time.

The doctrine that there are constitutional courts organized under Article III and legislative courts organized with other powers comes from American Insurance Co. v. Canter (1828). There, the court upheld an Article IV tribunal's exercise of admiralty jurisdiction, which is mentioned in Article III. As a legislative court, the scope of that tribunal's power was defined by a statute passed by Congress in a valid exercise of its powers under Article IV. From that case until O'Donoghue, constitutional courts and legislative courts were treated as mutually exclusive categories.

==== The District judiciary before O'Donoghue ====
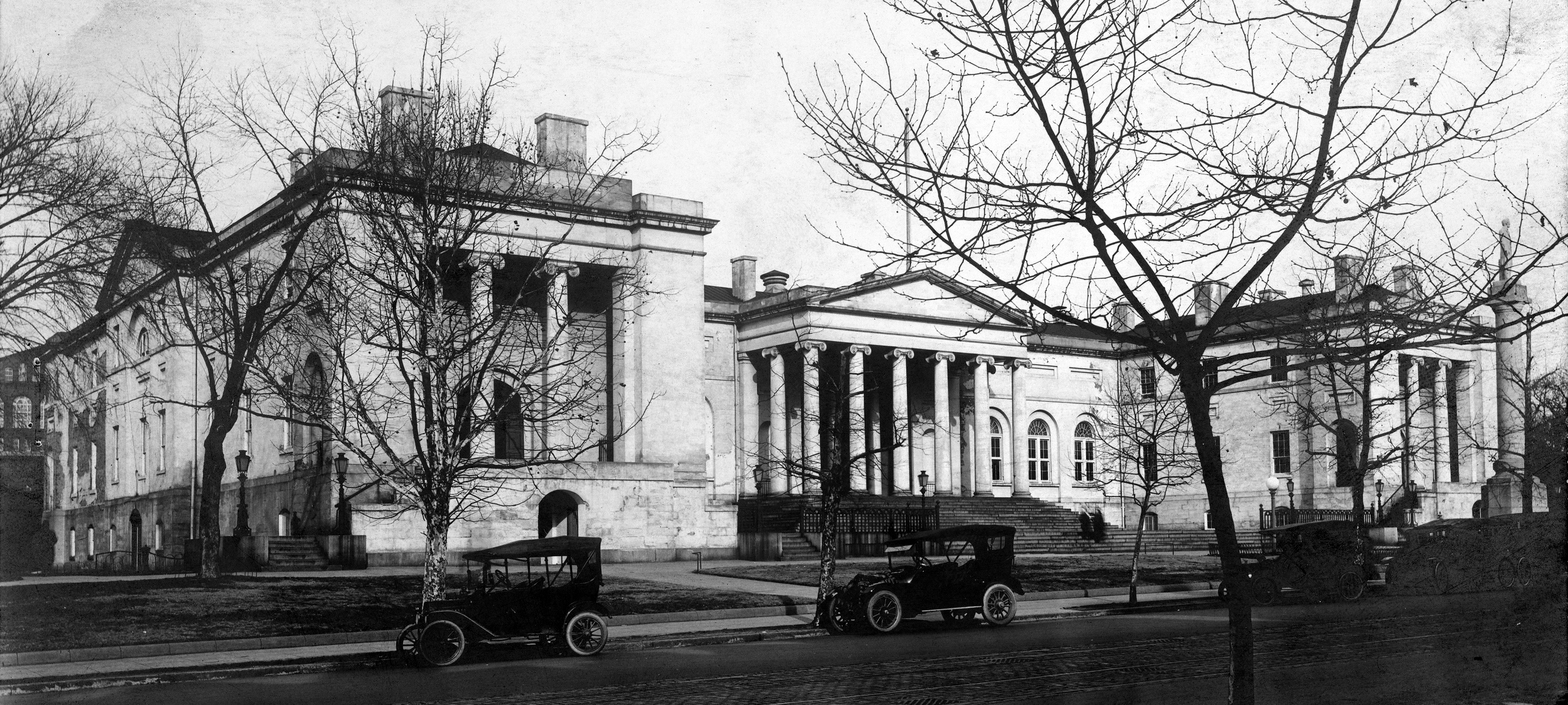
District of Columbia City Hall, home to both of the District of Columbia's courts (pictured c. 1916)

Congress established the District's first judicial system in 1801. The Circuit Court of the District of Columbia was both a trial court of general jurisdiction and an appellate court, and it heard cases under both local and federal law. The Circuit Court was replaced by the Supreme Court of the District of Columbia in 1863, and Congress created the District of Columbia Court of Appeals to handle the appellate cases separately in 1893. The District judiciary's authority to hear local law cases must have come from somewhere in the Constitution other than Article III.

Article I, Section 8, Clause 17 authorizes Congress "[t]o exercise exclusive Legislation in all Cases whatsoever, over such District (not exceeding ten Miles square) as may, by Cession of particular States, and the Acceptance of Congress, become the Seat of the Government of the United States...." Under this clause, Congress imposed unique, non-judicial duties upon the courts of the District. For example, the District judiciary could modify valuations, rates, and regulations established by the District Public Utilities Commission, and these courts could issue orders that the justices thought the Commission should have made. The Supreme Court approved of these extra, Article I powers in Keller v. Potomac Electric Power Co. (1923). Said the court, "[Congress] possesses a dual authority over the District and may clothe the courts of the District not only with the jurisdiction and powers of federal courts in the several States but with such authority as a State may confer on her courts." The Supreme Court did so again in Postum Cereal Co. v. California Fig Nut Co. (1927), where the court held that the District's Court of Appeals could make "administrative" decisions when reviewing agency actions and that these reviews were not "cases" under Article III, meaning the reviews were not subject to judicial review by higher courts. The court reaffirmed Postum in Federal Radio Commission v. General Electric Co. (1930), when it said that a District judiciary court's statutory power to review a Radio Commission order under the Radio Act of 1927 was an administrative action, not a judicial decision cognizable as Article III subject matter, so it could not be appealed to any Article III court. Within weeks of the latter decision, Congress amended the law to allow judicial review of those decisions. (Note: Act of July 1, 1930, ch. 788, sec. 1, § 16(d), 46 Stat. 844, 845.)

Alternatively, it is possible for a territorial court to sit as both a court of federal law and as a court of local law because those are Article IV tribunals. As the Supreme Court confirmed in Hepburn v. Ellzey (1805), the District of Columbia is not included in the term "State" within the Constitution; it is a territory. In Ex parte Bakelite Corp. (1929), after explaining that territorial courts were valid, the Supreme Court said this in passing:

A like view has been taken of the status and jurisdiction of the courts provided by Congress for the District of Columbia. These courts, this Court has held, are created in virtue of the power of Congress "to exercise exclusive legislation" over the district made the seat of the government of the United States, are legislative, rather than constitutional, courts, and may be clothed with the authority and charged with the duty of giving advisory decisions in proceedings which are not cases or controversies within the meaning of Article III, but are merely in aid of legislative or executive action, and therefore outside the admissible jurisdiction of courts established under that article.

In sum, before O'Donoghue, the common understanding was that the courts of the District judiciary were legislative courts that did not have Article III powers.

But this treatment was not entirely consistent. In Benson v. Henkel (1905), the United States Supreme Court said that the District of Columbia Supreme Court was "a court of the United States" within the terms of the statute providing for the apprehension and holding of persons for trial; (Note: 1 Stat. 91 (1789), 18 U.S.C. 591 (1926).) this is another way of referring to Article III courts. In Federal Trade Commission v. Klesner (1929), the Supreme Court said that the "parallelism" between the District judiciary and other federal courts was "complete." Additionally, the District judiciary's justices had previously referred to their forums as constitutional courts bound by the Judicial Code.

=== Pay cut ===
Daniel W. O'Donoghue was an associate justice of the Supreme Court of the District of Columbia, having been duly appointed to that position by President Herbert Hoover by and with the advice and consent of the Senate. He duly qualified as a justice on February 29, 1932, and he had ever since been performing the duties of the office. At the time of his appointment, his salary was fixed by an act of Congress (Note: Chapter 6, 44 Stat. 919.) at $10,000 per year, which was paid to him until June 30, 1932.

William Hitz was an associate justice of the District of Columbia Court of Appeals, having been appointed on December 5, 1930, by President Hoover and later confirmed by the Senate. On February 13, 1931, he duly qualified as an associate justice, and he had ever since been performing the duties of the office. By the same act of Congress, his salary was fixed at $12,500 per year, which was paid to him until June 30, 1932.

During the Great Depression, Congress passed the Legislative Appropriation Act of June 30, 1932, (Note: Chapter 314, 47 Stat. 382, 401.) to reduce the salaries of all federal judges whose salaries could be reduced. Because Article III includes the Compensation Clause guaranteeing that a federal judge of an Article III court "shall, at stated times, receive for their services a compensation which shall not be diminished during their continuance in office", this reduction excluded Article III judges. However, it included the federal judges presiding over federal tribunals organized under different articles of the Constitution, including Article I tribunals and Article IV tribunals.

In July 1932, John R. McCarl, the Comptroller General of the United States, ruled that the Court of Appeals and the Supreme Court of the District of Columbia were legislative courts and that their justices were not entitled to the protection of the Compensation Clause. Thereupon, the Department of Justice reduced the annual compensation of Justice O'Donoghue by 10 percent and Justice Hitz by 20 percent.

In O'Donoghue's case, the justices of the District's Supreme Court pooled their resources and overtly selected him to be their representative as the plaintiff in a test case. He was the newest appointee to the court and had recently given up his lucrative private practice to become a justice. As such, the $10,000 payment that had been reduced was relatively nominal for O'Donoghue, and others on the court had been more adversely affected overall. Nonetheless, the justices figured that O'Donoghue's story gave him the most direct argument that he had been harmed by the legislation.

=== United States Court of Claims ===
On January 19, 1933, O'Donoghue and Hitz each sued in the United States Court of Claims to recover the amount of the deductions. The justices—that is, all of the justices with an interest in the case—sought out the best representation they could get. O'Donoghue and Hitz shared three lawyers who were very prominent at the time: George E. Hamilton, Sr., John W. Davis, and John S. Flannery. O'Donoghue was represented by a fourth lawyer: his son, Daniel W. O'Donoghue, Jr., who had been practicing for a short time and contributed to the briefs. Meanwhile, the government was represented in both cases by H. B. Holland and Charles F. Kincheloe.

The justices argued that the courts they presided over were Article III courts and that they were Article III judges entitled to the protection of the Compensation Clause. Regarding any differences between the District courts and other federal courts, the justices contended that Congress had never restricted the District courts' Article III authority and had only acted under other parts of the Constitution (including Article I, Section 8, Clause 17) to enlarge the District courts' powers beyond those of other federal courts. The plaintiffs said that they were bringing the suit to determine the constitutional status of the courts, not merely to personally enrich themselves.

The government replied that the justices of the District judiciary were not Article III judges and were therefore not protected by the Compensation Clause. Thus, the government asserted that the appropriation act reducing their wages was constitutional.

Presiding over the two cases were Judges William R. Green, Benjamin H. Littleton, and Richard S. Whaley. Chief Justice Fenton Whitlock Booth took no part because he was ill. (Note: Judge Green served as Acting Chief Justice.) Judge Thomas Sutler Williams also took no part in the case; at the time, Williams was also suing the United States over the pay cut's application to the Court of Claims, and his case reached the Supreme Court of the United States as Williams v. United States (1933). Instead of deciding the O'Donoghue and Hitz cases, the Court of Claims issued two certified questions for each case to the Supreme Court of the United States under the Judiciary Act of 1925:

1. "Does Section 1, Article III, of the Constitution of the United States apply to the Supreme Court (and to the Court of Appeals) of the District of Columbia and forbid a reduction of the compensation of the Justices thereof during their continuance in office?"
2. "Can the compensation of a Justice of the Supreme Court (or of the Court of Appeals) of the District of Columbia be lawfully diminished during his continuance in office?"

== United States Supreme Court ==
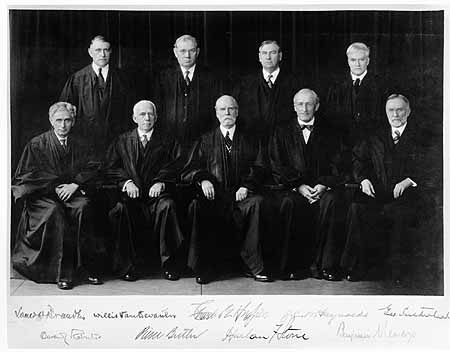
The United States Supreme Court lineup as of 1933 (Sutherland on the far right)

The Supreme Court consolidated the cases, and oral argument was on April 12, 1933. John W. Davis stood for the justices. At the Supreme Court, the government was represented by Solicitor General Thomas D. Thacher, William W. Scott, Robert P. Reeder, Erwin Griswold and H. Brian Holland. O'Donoghue, Jr., who remained on the justices' team after consolidation, recalled that the lawyer who stood for the government at oral arguments did not present his case well.

The Supreme Court issued an opinion by Justice George Sutherland on May 29, 1933. The Supreme Court decided that the District judiciary's courts were Article III courts, entitling their Article III judges to the protection of the Compensation Clause. To resolve the contradiction with the doctrine that constitutional courts and legislative courts were mutually exclusive, the court announced that the District Judiciary's courts were actually both constitutional courts and legislative courts at the same time. Regarding the court's observation in Ex parte Bakelite Corp. that the District judiciary had legislative courts, the O'Donoghue court said that was dicta that was not required for the decision, and so it ignored that.

The hybrid nature of these courts means that the grant of power to Congress under Article I coincides with the grant of judicial power to the District judiciary under Article III. That is, Congress may adopt additional legislation regulating the District of Columbia's courts under Article I, but this legislation cannot affect those courts' judicial power under Article III. Because that specific Article I power is limited to the District, Congress cannot use it to legislate regarding federal courts elsewhere. Said the court, "The two powers are not incompatible; and we perceive no reason for holding that the plenary power given by the District clause of the Constitution may be used to destroy the operative effect of the judicial clause within the District." This observation distinguished O'Donoghue from the Keller case.

The Court also addressed other matters in the opinion regarding the nature of the District as a territory of the United States rather than a state. Primarily, the court said that the lack of Article III protections for courts in the territories was "no doubt due to" their temporary nature as provisional governments. Congress is not required to extend lifetime tenure to judges in courts that are not intended to exist in perpetuity. The District, on the other hand, was a permanent establishment as the capital of the country.

The court also recalled Downes v. Bidwell (1901) when it said the Constitution does not extend to a territorial holding of the United States unless and until Congress announces that it does. However, the District of Columbia is distinct from all other territories because it is composed of land that was previously occupied by states. Once Congress has extended the Constitution's reach to an area, Congress cannot withdraw it.

In the same vein, the court also observed that the language granting that power referred to "the Territory or other Property belonging to the United States." Since the language was not "territory or property", the court discerned a difference between "the territory" and "a territory" belonging to the United States. The former refers to land controlled by the United States whereas the latter refers to a governmental subdivision which happens to be called a "territory" but may as well be called by another name like colony, province, or insular area.

=== Dissent ===
The dissent co-written by Justices Charles Evans Hughes, Willis Van Devanter, and Benjamin N. Cardozo asserted that the District judiciary's courts were Article I tribunals and not Article III courts. To the dissenters, Article I, Section 8, Clause 17 gave Congress the authority to establish the District of Columbia courts as they were without recourse to Article III authority. Because the dissenters would not have reached for Article III, they said the District's justices were not entitled to the protection of Article III's Compensation Clause.

== Later developments ==
=== Reactions ===
The O'Donoghue decision was a surprise to legal audiences. In the years since, many commentators have criticized it, saying its amendments of the legislative courts doctrine lacked justification other than the needs of the particular federal courts. It is common for legal scholarship to despair over the intractable irreconcilability of the doctrine represented by all the relevant cases before and after O'Donoghue. However, some scholars have suggested that American law might embrace the ambiguity of this. An anonymous writer in the Yale Law Journal said,

[T]he reduction of judges' salaries, the performance by courts of administrative functions, and the extent of the Supreme Court's appellate powers, are, in the last analysis, questions involving entirely different considerations. There is no practical reason why the solutions of any one of them should control the determination of the others. Indeed, the very absence of a rigid, legal doctrine clearly stating each problem in terms of the others is a virtue. For where too much logic leads only to confusion of issues, it is better that the Court be entirely free to decide each case upon its individual merits.

As to specific errors in the court's reasoning, Professor James E. Pfander of Northwestern University has explained the deep flaws of this case's historical representations. For example, the court's references to the implied life tenure of territorial courts were completely ahistorical: those courts had life tenure because they were subject to the Northwest Ordinance, which explicitly specified life tenure for judges. Pfander also explained that the acts of Congress that created the District's courts could not have been intended to make them Article III courts because they followed conventions that distinguished Article I tribunals from Article III courts at the time; for instance, the act creating the original Circuit Court specified that the court had powers described "by law". Nevertheless, in the wake of O'Donoghue, it is not difficult to find accounts that simply accept the court's historical representations as true and claim that Congress created the District judiciary as Article III courts from the beginning.

=== Other Article III courts cannot have Article I powers ===
The interpretation of O'Donoghue and its hybrid court concept became an active issue in 1940, when Congress amended the Judicial Code to incorporate the District of Columbia as the equivalent of a state for the purposes of diversity jurisdiction. (Note: 154 Stat. 143 (1940), 28 U. S. C. § 41(1)(b) (Supp. 1947).) This expanded the number of cases that the federal courts had jurisdiction over to include non-federal cases where one of the parties happened to reside in the District. The majority of federal district courts rejected this amendment because they believed that the expansion was not permitted under Article III. Likewise, naysaying courts believed the expansion was not permitted under the Article I considerations of O'Donoghue because it affected federal courts other than the District judiciary. Courts supporting the amendment argued that O'Donoghue stood for the more expansive proposition that Congress could grant non-Article-III powers to Article III courts as long as those powers were derived from legitimate uses of other constitutional provisions.

For instance, the Tucker Act of 1887 granted federal courts concurrent jurisdiction over all cases that could be heard in the Court of Claims where the amount in controversy did not exceed $10,000. The Court of Claims was an Article I tribunal organized to pay the debts of the United States. The Supreme Court confirmed in Williams v. United States (1933), around the same time that O'Donoghue was decided, that the Court of Claims's powers did not come from Article III. However, unlike Bakelite and other previous decisions, the Williams court assumed that an Article I tribunal could not constitutionally consider cases within Article III jurisdiction. Still, under the expansive reading of O'Donoghue, the Tucker Act's extension of this jurisdiction would have been a constitutional use of Congress's Article I power (to pay debts) to grant a power to Article III courts outside the scope of Article III.

In National Mutual Insurance Co. v. Tidewater Transfer Co. (1949), the Supreme Court considered this issue when a divided coalition of five justices upheld the treatment of the District as a state for diversity purposes. The lead plurality opinion of Justice Robert H. Jackson, with three votes, argued that the expansion of diversity jurisdiction to cover the District was a valid exercise of Congress's plenary powers over the District under Article I. Furthermore, Jackson cited O'Donoghue when he said "It is too late to hold that judicial functions incidental to Art. I powers of Congress cannot be conferred on courts existing under Art. III, for it has been done with this Court's approval." However, five justices explicitly opposed expanding O'Donoghue to any courts outside of the District. Although Justice Wiley B. Rutledge concurred in the judgment, he said in an opinion with two votes that "I strongly dissent from the reasons assigned to support it in [Jackson's] opinion...." Pertinently, Rutledge asserted that O'Donoghue was limited to the District judiciary and said that Jackson's contrary reasoning "would entangle every district court of the United States, for the first time, in all of the contradictions, complexities and subtleties which have surrounded the courts of the District of Columbia in the maze woven by the 'legislative court–constitutional court' controversy running through this Court's decisions concerning them." In a dissent with two votes, Chief Justice Fred M. Vinson said that O'Donoghue only applied to the District. The other dissent, by Justice Felix Frankfurter with two votes, did not refer to O'Donoghue by name. Frankfurter argued that Article III, Section 2 was to be read strictly such that "only 'judicial power' can be 'vested' in [Article III courts]."

In the intervening years, Congress passed resolutions to assert that the courts considered in Bakelite and Williams were intended to be Article III courts. The Supreme Court responded in Glidden Co. v. Zdanok (1962), holding in a fractured decision that this intent was sufficient evidence that they were Article III courts. The test is still based on the court's functions and composition, but Justice Harlan said in the court's plurality opinion that Congress's statement of intent mattered because "Mr. Justice Sutherland, who wrote the Court's opinions in both Williams and O'Donoghue, was plainly disadvantaged by the absence of congressional intimation as to which judges of which courts were to be deemed exempted." The court overruled Bakelite and Williams but accepted the logic of Bakelite that Article I tribunals could have concurrent jurisdiction over Article III subject matter. Plus, Harlan's opinion said O'Donoghue only applied to the courts of the District. Thus, the weight of Supreme Court precedent counsels against an expansive reading of O'Donoghue; only the District judiciary can contain such a hybrid because of Congress's special Article I powers over the area.

=== The District judiciary after O'Donoghue and today ===
William Hitz continued as a justice until his death in 1935. Daniel W. O'Donoghue also continued as a justice, and he assumed senior status in 1946. His service terminated in 1948, due to his death. The two courts of the District judiciary continued to operate as hybrid courts for several more decades. The hybrid courts had some Article I duties that were not related to deciding local law cases. For example, the District Court had the power to appoint school board members.

In the District of Columbia Court Reform and Criminal Procedure Act of 1970, (Note: "District of Columbia Court Reorganization Act of 1970", Pub. L. 91–358, 84 Stat. 475, enacted July 29, 1970, §111, D.C. Code § 11-101) Congress replaced the previous system and created a separation between the District's courts handling local matters and the District's courts handling federal matters.

==== Article I tribunals ====
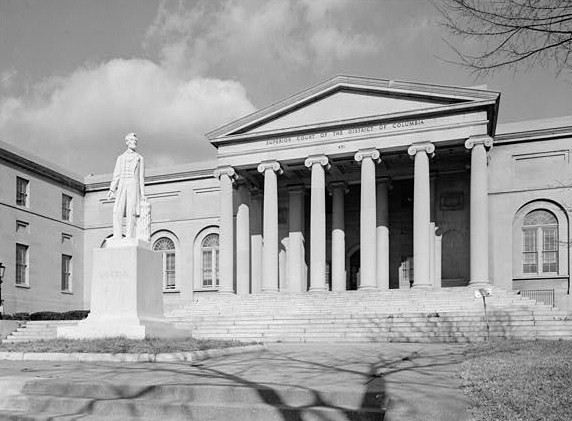
District of Columbia City Hall, home to the Superior Court of the District of Columbia (pictured 1971)

Congress specifically declared it was acting pursuant to Article I in creating the District's courts for local law, the Superior Court of the District of Columbia and the District of Columbia Court of Appeals. The Supreme Court sustained these Article I tribunals in Palmore v. United States (1973) and again in Swain v. Pressley (1977), a decision upholding the Superior Court's substitute for habeas corpus.

In Palmore, a criminal defendant challenged the constitutionality of the District's Article I courts, arguing that charges under the D.C. Criminal Code were a prosecution under federal law that needed to be heard by an Article III court. The Supreme Court rejected the argument, explaining that it was not necessary for every proceeding involving a federal law be conducted in an Article III court. State courts, after all, could hear cases involving federal law, as could territorial and military courts. The majority dedicated an entire section of the Palmore decision to explaining why O'Donoghue did not require them to hold that all of the courts in the District were Article III courts. In that section, Justice Byron White described O'Donoghue as a decision made "over three dissents and contrary to extensive prior dicta". The court distinguished the cases by pointing out that the modern courts had separated the federal and local dockets. The dissent in Palmore, written by Justice William O. Douglas, observed that the explicit purpose of constructing these courts as Article I tribunals was to expose their judges to the influence of Congress. The O'Donoghue court had said that Congress had the power to grant legislative or executive functions to the District judiciary but that this power may not be used "to destroy the operative effect of the judicial clause within the District," and Douglas said that allowing a non-Article-III tribunal to handle judicial cases—especially within criminal law—did just that. Douglas described the Palmore decision as a "major retreat" from O'Donoghue.

Aliza Shatzman, co-founder of an organization that advocates for the labor rights of law clerks who work for the federal courts, called for the D.C. judiciary's local courts to be regulated more similarly to other Article I tribunals in 2022. Congress has prohibited the local Council of the District of Columbia from passing any legislation to alter the composition of these courts, so this call would require congressional action. There are significant differences present in these local courts, compared to other Article I tribunals. For instance, the judges have de facto life tenure. (Note: They serve 15-year terms, and a renewal is presumed. It is rare for a judge to serve more than 30 years.) The D.C. Commission on Judicial Disabilities and Tenure, which handles judicial discipline, has never removed a judge for misbehavior. Shatzman reported experiencing instances of gender discrimination and retaliation that were handled inadequately. She attributed them to the way the local courts are designed, particularly alleging that the lax disciplinary procedures dissuade law clerks from filing reports and encourage the judges to treat them tyrannically.

==== Article III courts ====
In the 1970 legislation, Congress also said that the courts directly at issue in O'Donoghue v. United States were Article III courts exclusively. So they have continued to today. Because the courts of the District judiciary no longer have mixed duties and the Supreme Court has never approved a hybrid outside of the District, the holding of O'Donoghue v. United States does not describe any court that currently exists.
