= Utility (patentability requirement) =

Concept in United States patent law

In United States patent law, utility is a patentability requirement. As provided by 35 U.S.C. § 101, an invention is "useful" if it provides some identifiable benefit and is capable of use and "useless" otherwise. The majority of inventions are usually not challenged as lacking utility, but the doctrine prevents the patenting of fantastic or hypothetical devices such as perpetual motion machines.

The patent examiners guidelines require that a patent application expresses a specific, credible, and substantial utility. Rejection by an examiner usually requires documentary evidence establishing a prima facie showing that there is no specific, substantial, and credible utility.

The main reason for having the utility requirement is to prevent issuing patents on things which are speculative and may block useful inventions in the future. In a pharmaceutical context, the utility problem usually arises when there is a patent claim on a new drug, but the patent disclosure does not specify (or does not prove) what disease this drug treats. Notably, a full FDA approval of the drug is not required before a patent application is filed. It suffices to demonstrate that this drug candidate passes some established in vitro test (see below).

One commentator explained in 1853 the rationale against useless inventions as:

A patent for a useless invention is thought by some to be void at common law by others by force of the Statute of Monopolies which renders void grants of privileges which tend to the hurt of trade or are generally inconvenient. Now if a monopoly were allowed in a useless invention other persons would be prevented from improving it or turning it to any account whatever so that combinations of utility might be impeded. It would stand in the way of real inventors and hence be mischievous to the public generally.

European patent law and Patent Cooperation Treaty instead of utility use the term industrial applicability. Although it serves a similar purpose as the US utility and patentable subject matter requirements, it is more narrow in practice.

== Utility criteria ==
In considering the requirement of utility for patents, there are three main factors to review: operability of the invention, a beneficial use of the invention, and practical use of the invention.

=== Operability ===
The importance of operability as a requirement of claims is disputed.

Janice Mueller claims that an inoperable invention may fail to satisfy the enablement requirement under 35 U.S.C. § 112 because "an inventor cannot properly describe how to use an inoperable invention...." However, as authority Ms. Mueller's textbook cites to another textbook, Landis on Mechanics of Patent Claim Drafting, which itself cites section 2173.05(l) in the Manual of Patent Examining Procedure. Section 2173.05(l) has not been part of the Manual of Patent Examining Procedure since the 1990s. The most recent pronouncement of the Manual of Patent Examining Procedure is 2107.01:

Situations where an invention is found to be "inoperative" and therefore lacking in utility are rare, and rejections maintained solely on this ground by a Federal court even rarer. In many of these cases, the utility asserted by the applicant was thought to be "incredible in the light of the knowledge of the art, or factually misleading" when initially considered by the Office. ... Other cases suggest that on initial evaluation, the Office considered the asserted utility to be inconsistent with known scientific principles or "speculative at best" as to whether attributes of the invention necessary to impart the asserted utility were actually present in the invention. ... However cast, the underlying finding by the court in these cases was that, based on the factual record of the case, it was clear that the invention could not and did not work as the inventor claimed it did. Indeed, the use of many labels to describe a single problem (e.g., a false assertion regarding utility) has led to some of the confusion that exists today with regard to a rejection based on the "utility" requirement.

=== Beneficial utility ===
Beneficial utility became established as a requirement in United States patent law in 1817 as a result of Lowell v. Lewis (1 Mason. 182; 1 Robb, Pat. Cas. 131 Circuit Court, D. Massachusetts. May Term. 1817.). The utility criterion established by this case is, as Justice Joseph Story wrote in the Court's decision, that, to be patentable, an invention must be "useful" and must "not be frivolous or injurious to the well-being, good policy, or sound morals of society". In spite of this ruling however, patents continued to be granted for devices that could be deemed immoral (e.g. gambling devices, see, e.g., Brewer v. Lichtenstein and Ex parte Murphy) or deceitful (see, Juicy Whip, Inc. v. Orange Bang, Inc. (dealing with a juice dispenser that arguably deceived the public into believing that the liquid seen in the attached reservoir was that which was being dispensed)). In Juicy Whip, the Court of Appeals for the Federal Circuit put an end to the requirement: "Congress never intended that the patent laws should displace the police powers of the States, meaning by that term those powers by which the health, good order, peace and general welfare of the community are promoted…we find no basis in section 101 to hold that inventions can be ruled unpatentable for lack of utility simply because they have the capacity to fool some members of the public."(Juicy Whip Inc. v. Orange Bang Inc., 185 F.3d 1364, 1367–68, 51 USPQ2d 1700, 1702-03 (Fed. Cir. 1999), see also Manual of Patent Examining Procedure 706.03(a)(II))

=== Practical utility ===
The last utility category is practical or specific utility. According to Mueller, "to be patentable an invention must have some real-world use." The utility threshold is relatively easy to satisfy for mechanical, electrical, or novelty inventions, because the purpose of the utility requirement is to ensure that the invention works on some minimal level. However, the practical or specific utility requirement for patentability may be more difficult to satisfy for chemical or biological inventions, because of the level of uncertainty in these fields. The United States Supreme Court in Brenner v. Manson (in 1966) held that a novel process for making a known steroid did not satisfy the utility requirement, because the patent applicants did not show that the steroid served any practical function. The Court ruled, "... a process patent in the chemical field, which has not been developed and pointed to the degree of specific utility, creates a monopoly of knowledge which should be granted only if clearly commanded by the statute." Practical or specific utility is the requirement for an invention to have a particular purpose.

== History and development ==
The very first US Patent Act of 1790 required patentable inventions to be "sufficiently useful and important". An 1817 case Lowell v. Lewis (Circuit Court, D. Massachusetts) proclaimed that: the word "useful," therefore, is incorporated into the [Patent] act in contradistinction to mischievous or immoral. This very broad definition survived well into the Twentieth Century. It was the basis for the beneficial utility doctrine, which excludes from patentability anything immoral or deceitful. However, in the 1970's after cases establishing patentability of a slot machine in 1977, and drink machines with decorative reservoirs that did not contain the drink actually dispensed, the United States Patent and Trademark Office and federal courts no longer consider beneficial utility nor the deceitful or immoral qualities of inventions.

However, it is not only "mischievous or immoral" inventions, that fase the utility challenge. Oftentimes new chemicals, which are known to be useful as a class, but have not demonstrated a "specific, substantial and credible utility" are denied a patent. The landmark decision in this area is 1966 Brenner v. Manson. In this case, the SCOTUS concluded that a new steroid was not "useful" in the meaning of the patent law, because it had no defined use at the time of the application. "A patent is not a hunting license," the Court stated. It is "not a reward for the search, but compensation for [the search's] successful conclusion." This standard for utility cannot be met until a "specific benefit exists in currently available form."

On the same day as Brenner v. Manson, the Court decided two other cases In re Kirk and In re Joly. These cases denied patentability to chemical intermediates for products, which had no known use.

In 1955 United States Court of Appeals for the Federal Circuit in In re Brana clarified, that utility requirement for pharmaceutical inventions does not require formal approval by the Food and Drug Administration. Instead an in vitro proof of efficacy, using a known test is sufficient.

In 1995, the USPTO published new utility guidelines, which eliminated the "substantial", but retained “specific” and “credible” requirements. In the case of a process of making chemicals, the utility of the process can be established only if a product of this process has a utility. Thus, a process resulting only in products, which have no known use, is not patentable.

Another landmark decision related to utility of biological inventions was 2005 case In re Fisher. It denied patentability of express sequence tags (which are “tiny portion[s] of an entire gene that can be used to help identify unknown genes and to map their positions within a genome”), because their only known use at the time of patent application was as a research tool.

The utility of invention must be demonstrated in the patent application itself. Post application activities cannot be used to prove utility.

== Burden of proof during prosecution ==
During patent prosecution, the disclosed utility is presumed valid. The patent office bears the burden to disprove utility. The standard the USPTO uses is whether it is more likely than not that it would lack utility from the perspective of a person having ordinary skill in the art. If the examiner shows evidence that the invention is not useful, the burden shifts to the applicant to prove utility. The applicant can then submit additional data to support a finding of utility. The invention must possess utility at the time of application.

== See also ==
- Diamond v. Diehr
- Incredible utility
- Reduction to practice
- State Street Bank v. Signature Financial Group
- Sufficiency of disclosure
- Utility in Canadian patent law
- Utility model
