= W. W. Scott =

W. W. Scott may refer to:

- William Winfield Scott (1855–1935), historian and lawyer
- Winfield W. Scott III, Major General
