= Postum Cereal Co. v. California Fig Nut Co. =

- Supreme Court of the United States

Decided January 3, 1927
- Full case name: Postum Cereal Co. v. California Fig Nut Co.
- Citations: 272 U.S. 693 (more)

Case history
- Prior: 297 Fed. 544 (1924)

Holding
- A proceeding before a legislative court to review an agency action was an administrative matter and not a "case" within the meaning of Article III of the Constitution.

Court membership
- Chief Justice William H. Taft Associate Justices Oliver W. Holmes Jr. · Willis Van Devanter; James C. McReynolds · Louis Brandeis; George Sutherland · Pierce Butler; Edward T. Sanford · Harlan F. Stone

Case opinion
- Majority: Taft, joined by unanimous
- Superseded by
- Brenner v. Manson

Postum Cereal Co. v. California Fig Nut Co., 272 U.S. 693 (1927), was a United States Supreme Court case in which the court held that a proceeding before the Court of Appeals of the District of Columbia to review an agency action was an administrative matter and not a "case" within the meaning of Article III of the Constitution. The Court of Appeals addressed this sort of administrative matter as a legislative court commissioned by Congress to exercise Congress's power, not judicial power. As such, the Court of Appeal's decision about the administrative matter was not subject to judicial review by higher courts. Because the trademark-related reviews at issue in this case were later transferred to an Article III court, they are subject to judicial review today.

== Background ==
=== Legal configuration of the courts in this case ===
Congress has the power to create legislative courts to adjudicate disputes related to its powers under the Constitution, such as those provided under Article I or Article IV. A legislative court's purpose is limited to the exercise of that congressional power. Legislative courts are distinct from constitutional courts, which exercise the judicial power of the United States under Article III, not congressional power. A legislative court can have concurrent jurisdiction over at least some of the matters covered by Article III, and its powers need not be limited in the ways that Article III jurisdiction is, because its powers are not derived from Article III.

At the time Postum was decided, the conventional wisdom was that the local courts in Washington, D.C., including the Court of Appeals for the District of Columbia, were legislative courts organized under Article I, not constitutional courts organized under Article III. (Note: The Supreme Court announced that the District's courts were actually hybrid courts organized under both Article I and Article III at the same time in a 1933 case, O'Donoghue v. United States.) Article I, Section 8, Clause 17 authorizes Congress "[t]o exercise exclusive Legislation in all Cases whatsoever, over such District (not exceeding ten Miles square) as may, by Cession of particular States, and the Acceptance of Congress, become the Seat of the Government of the United States...." Under this clause, Congress imposed non-judicial duties upon the courts of the District. For example, the District judiciary could modify valuations, rates, and regulations established by the District Public Utilities Commission, and these courts could issue orders that the justices thought the Commission should have made. The Supreme Court approved of these courts having non-judicial powers under Article I in Keller v. Potomac Electric Power Co. (1923).

In contrast, the United States Supreme Court is a constitutional court organized under Article III. The Constitution describes the Supreme Court's original jurisdiction over some matters, but the court otherwise relies on Article III jurisdiction like other constitutional courts. Article III jurisdiction only allows a court to resolve "cases" or "controversies" as permitted by the Constitution and authorized by Congress. Of this requirement, Chief Justice Earl Warren once said "those two words have an iceberg quality, containing beneath their surface simplicity submerged complexities which go to the very heart of our constitutional form of government." Even so, it can be said that a case or controversy involves a dispute over a legal right between adverse parties, each with substantial enough interests in the result to allow them to represent their own side adequately. The pronouncements, policies and programs of administrative agencies typically do not create justiciable cases or controversies unless the administrative action interferes with or threatens to interfere with a complaining person's legal rights.

=== The trademark dispute ===
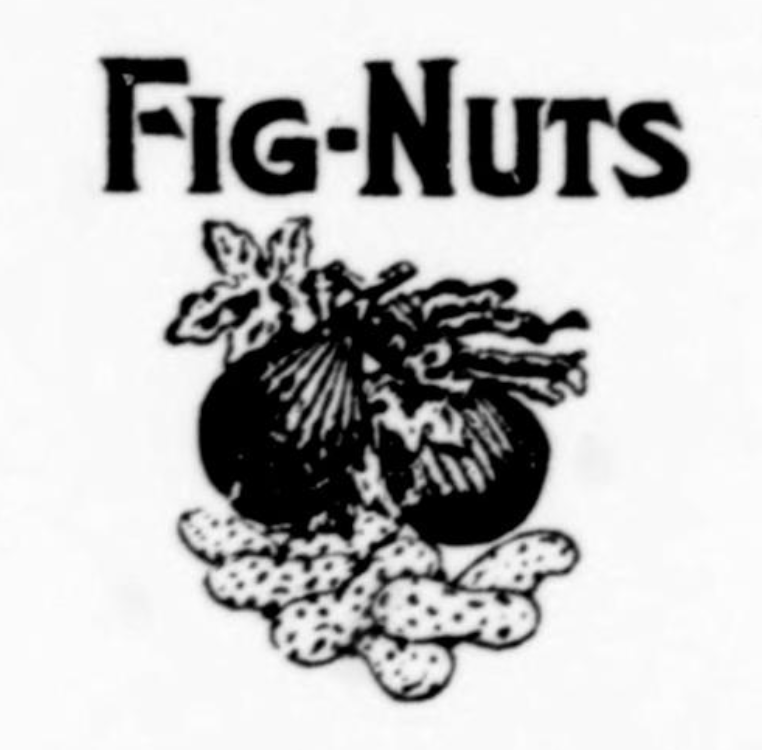
The trademark for Fig-Nuts cereal, registered January 18, 1921

The Postum Cereal Company and its predecessors in title had for years manufactured a cereal breakfast food under the trademark "Grape-Nuts", for which they secured registrations under the Trademark Act of 1905. They filed a petition of opposition to the registration by the California Fig Nut Company of the trademark "Fig-Nuts" which that company had registered under the Trademark Act of 1920. Postum argued that the "Fig-Nuts" mark was likely to cause confusion, deceiving purchasers into thinking they were buying "Grape-Nuts.'

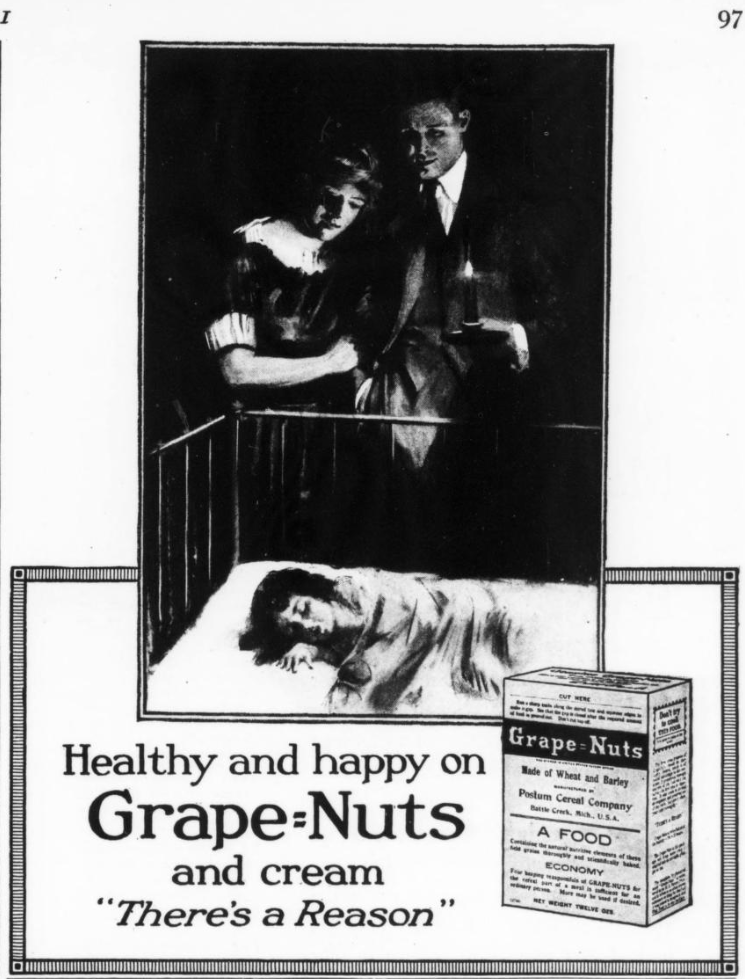
An ad for Grape-Nuts cereal, published in January 1921

Section 2 of the 1920 act provided that, when any person believed themself to be injured by the registration of a trademark under the act, they may have applied to the United States Commissioner of Patents to cancel it. Upon notice to the registrant, a hearing was to be had before an examiner of interferences in the Patent Office, with an appeal to the commissioner. California Fig Nut filed an answer denying that Postum was injured. The examiner of interferences held against Postum and recommended that the registration not be cancelled. The examiner's decision was appealed to the Commissioner of Patents, who affirmed it.

Postum appealed the commissioner's decision to the Court of Appeals of the District of Columbia. The case was argued by Edward S. Rogers for Postum and Arthur E. Wallace for California Fig Nut. On March 10, 1924, the Court of Appeals issued an opinion denying the appeal for lack of jurisdiction to hear it. The 1920 act repealed the 1905 act, except that Section 6 of the 1920 act listed provisions of the 1905 act that were retained. Section 9 of the 1905 act, which provided for an appeal from the decision of the Commissioner of Patents to the District Court of Appeals, was not included in that list. Noting that the appeal provision was repealed, the justices of the Court of Appeals held that they lacked jurisdiction to hear the case. Accordingly, the appeal was dismissed. However, the Court of Appeals allowed Postum to seek review of the jurisdictional question by the United States Supreme Court.

== Opinion of the court ==
On January 3, 1927, the Supreme Court issued a unanimous opinion denying certiorari and dismissing the appeal. Chief Justice William Howard Taft, writing for the court, said that it did not matter whether the Court of Appeals was right about its jurisdiction under the 1920 act:

The decision of the Court of Appeals [made in an appeal under the 1905 act was] not a judicial judgment. It [was] a mere administrative decision. It [was] merely an instruction to the Commissioner of Patents by a court which [was] made part of the machinery of the Patent Office for administrative purposes. In the exercise of such function, it [did] not enter a judgment binding parties in a case as the term case is used in the third article of the Constitution.

Because this administrative proceeding was outside the scope of Article III's limited jurisdiction, the decision was not subject to judicial review, and the Supreme Court did not have jurisdiction over the case. The Supreme Court supported its distinction by pointing out that it was still possible for an administrative decision to be reviewed by a court if a plaintiff sued properly in a federal district court after the administrative decision was final. This sort of process was called a "bill in equity".

By its text, the Postum decision was not limited to trademark decisions. It also applied to the Court of Appeals's patent decisions.

== Later developments ==
Authority over the review of trademarks was later transferred to the Court of Customs and Patent Appeals. In 1948, Congress passed a law expanding the Supreme Court's appellate jurisdiction and authorized the court to review any case heard by the CCPA via a writ of certiorari. However, the Supreme Court still refused to review these decisions under the rationale from Postum: it said they were administrative matters, not Article III cases or controversies.

When the Supreme Court held that the CCPA was an Article III court in Glidden Co. v. Zdanok, the court said that "the Postum decision must be taken to be limited to the statutory scheme in existence before the transfer of patent and trademark litigation to [the CCPA]." Under the modern scheme with Article III courts, this sort of review does involve a "case" or "controversy" within the meaning of Article III. The Supreme Court explicitly held that it could review a CCPA decision in Brenner v. Manson. When the CCPA was abolished in 1982, the CCPA's jurisdiction over cases was transferred to the United States Court of Appeals for the Federal Circuit.

Although the review of patent decisions is now largely governed by appeals in Article III courts under the Administrative Procedure Act, the bill in equity continues to exist as a mutually exclusive alternative.
