= Palmore v. United States =

- Supreme Court of the United States

Decided April 24, 1973
- Full case name: Palmore v. United States
- Citations: 411 U.S. 389 (more)

Holding
- Not every judicial proceeding that implicates a charge, claim, or defense based on an Act of Congress or a law made under its authority must be presided over by an Article III judge.

Court membership
- Chief Justice Warren E. Burger Associate Justices William O. Douglas · William J. Brennan Jr. Potter Stewart · Byron White; Thurgood Marshall · Harry Blackmun; Lewis F. Powell Jr. · William Rehnquist

Case opinions
- Majority: White
- Dissent: Douglas

Palmore v. United States, 411 U.S. 389 (1973), was a United States Supreme Court case in which the court held that not every judicial proceeding that implicates a charge, claim, or defense based on an Act of Congress or a law made under its authority must be presided over by an Article III judge.

== Background ==
=== The District judiciary ===
Before 1970, the District of Columbia judiciary consisted of two federal courts: a court of general jurisdiction now known as the United States District Court for the District of Columbia (then called the District's Supreme Court) and a court of appellate jurisdiction now known as the United States Court of Appeals for the District of Columbia Circuit (then called the District's Court of Appeals). (Note: The D.C. Circuit is an appellate court for federal law, and it has nothing to do with the District's appellate court for local law now called the District of Columbia Court of Appeals.) These courts handled cases based on either federal or local law. However, Article III of the United States Constitution does not allow courts organized pursuant to it to have jurisdiction over cases that arise under local law rather than federal. But, if these courts were Article I tribunals, then the judges would not have the benefits of Article III's protections in the Good Behavior Clause and the Compensation Clause. In O'Donoghue v. United States, the Supreme Court allowed these courts to exist despite that constitutional issue by announcing that they were unique hybrids: Article III courts and Article I tribunals at the same time.

In 1970, under the District of Columbia Court Reform and Criminal Procedure Act, Congress split the duties of these two courts among four adjudicative bodies: two to handle local law and two to handle federal law. The federal-law cases are handled by Article III courts, the same courts that were at-issue in O'Donoghue. The local-law cases are handled by Article I tribunals: the court of general jurisdiction is the Superior Court of the District of Columbia, and the court of appellate jurisdiction is the District of Columbia Court of Appeals.

=== Palmore's case ===
Palmore was convicted of a felony in violation of the District of Columbia Code by the Superior Court of the District of Columbia. On appeal in the District of Columbia Court of Appeals, Palmore argued that the local laws of the district, which are established by Congress, were federal laws and that he was entitled to be tried by an Article III judge with lifetime tenure and salary protection. The Court of Appeals rejected Palmore's argument and affirmed the Superior Court. It reasoned that, under the plenary power to legislate for the District of Columbia conferred by Article I, Section 8, Clause 17, of the Constitution, Congress had "constitutional power to proscribe certain criminal conduct only in the District, and to select the appropriate court, whether it is created by virtue of article III or article I, to hear and determine... particular criminal cases within the District."

Palmore sought to invoke the Supreme Court's appellate jurisdiction on the basis of 28 U.S.C. § 1257(2), which provides for an appeal to that court from a final judgment upholding the validity of "a statute of any state" against a claim that it is repugnant to the Constitution.

== Opinion of the court ==
The Supreme Court issued an opinion on April 24, 1973. The Supreme Court rejected Palmore's argument, explaining that it was not necessary that every proceeding involving an act of Congress or a law made under its authority be conducted in an Article III court. State courts, after all, could hear cases involving federal law, as could territorial and military courts. Thus, "the requirements of Art. III, which are applicable where laws of national applicability and affairs of national concern are at stake, must in proper circumstances give way to accommodate plenary grants of power to Congress to legislate with respect to specialized areas having particularized needs and warranting distinctive treatment."

=== Dissent ===
Justice William O. Douglas wrote a dissent. First, Douglas observed that "Legislative courts may be given executive and administrative duties, the examples being well known. But if they are given 'judicial Power,' as are the judges of the present Superior Court of the District, those trials have guarantees that are prescribed by the Constitution and Bill of Rights." He saw no reason to distinguish the various criminal rights required under the Bill of Rights from the guarantees of Article III that the majority neglected with this decision. Second, Douglas observed that the explicit purpose of making these courts Article I tribunals was to expose the judges making these decisions to the influence of Congress. When the court decided O'Donoghue, it said that Congress had the power to grant legislative or executive functions to District courts but this power may not be used "to destroy the operative effect of the judicial clause within the District." Douglass therefore described the Palmore decision as a "major retreat" from O'Donoghue. Third, Douglas observed that the majority's comparison to state coutrs was inapt because state judges are generally elected and subject to removal by state citizens. In contrast, the judges of the Superior Court are appointed by the President with no input by the District's population. Fourth, Douglas referred to his co-authored dissent in Glidden Co. v. Zdanok, saying "If the power exercised is 'judicial power' defined in Art. III, as was true in the present case, then the standards and procedures must conform to Art. III, one of which is an independent judiciary."

In sum, Douglass said:

Manipulated judiciaries are common across the world, especially in communist and fascist nations. The faith in freedom which we profess and which is opposed to those ideologies assumes today an ominous cast. It is ominous because it indirectly associates the causes of crime with the Bill of Rights, rather than with the sociological factors of poverty caused by unemployment and disemployment, the abrasive political tactics used against minorities, the blight of narcotics, and the like. Those who hold the gun at the heads of Superior Court judges can retaliate against those who respect the spirit of the Fourth Amendment and the Fifth Amendment and who stand firmly against the ancient practice of using the third degree to get confessions, and who fervently believe that the end does not justify the means. I would reverse the judgment below.

== Later developments ==
=== Criticism ===
Legal scholar Martin H. Redish has criticized Palmore's simple analogy to state courts as "dubious." It is true that Congress can grant jurisdiction over federal-law questions to state courts, and it has done so. However, Congress does not control the wages of state judges or how long they hold their offices. That is, those judges are meaningfully independent of the Federal legislative branch. Said Redish, "It is, then, one thing to say that state courts may adjudicate federal criminal cases; it is quite another to hold that individuals directly subject to the control of the federal government may do so." Article III does not constrain state legislatures, but it does include explicit limitations that the federal government is bound to. Redish also noted that the Court's reliance on an argument that the District judiciary was "overburdened" before Congress split it into four courts and that the new system was more efficient implied that Congress may avoid Article III's requirements whenever Congress is trying to address systemic problems that had become "unduly burdensome." This argument had been used in the past for the special cases of territorial and military courts, but its use for the District's courts approached a general rationale that could limit Article III's protections.
