= Luckenbach Steamship Co. v. United States =

- Supreme Court of the United States

Decided November 23, 1926
- Full case name: Luckenbach Steamship Company v. United States
- Citations: 272 U.S. 533 (more)

Holding
- The statute limiting all appeals of cases from the United States Court of Claims to questions of law was constitutional.

Court membership
- Chief Justice William H. Taft Associate Justices Oliver W. Holmes Jr. · Willis Van Devanter; James C. McReynolds · Louis Brandeis; George Sutherland · Pierce Butler; Edward T. Sanford · Harlan F. Stone

Case opinion
- Majority: Van Devanter, joined by unanimous

Luckenbach Steamship Co. v. United States, 272 U.S. 533 (1926), was a United States Supreme Court case in which the court held that the statute limiting all appeals of cases from the United States Court of Claims to questions of law was constitutional.

== Background ==
This was a suit to recover a balance alleged to be due for several barges and tugs, the possession of and title to which were taken over by the United States. (Note: The United States seized these assets under "An Act Making appropriations to supply urgent deficiencies in appropriations for the Military and Naval Establishments on account of war expenses for the fiscal year ending June thirtieth, nineteen hundred and seventeen, and for other purposes" (June 15, 1917), c. 29, 40 Stat. 182.) The plaintiff, Luckenbach Steamship Company, was dissatisfied with the compensation decided upon by the President of the United States. (Note: The decision does not specify which president or the precise time that the boats were taken.) Pursuant to the act, Luckenbach took three-fourths of the payment and sued to recover a further sum which, in addition to what was paid, was alleged to be just compensation. The Court of Claims found that the amount fixed by the president was just and entered judgment for the claimant for the one-fourth remaining unpaid. (Note: The Court of Claims case is at 59 Ct. Cl. 628 (1924).) The claimant, still dissatisfied, brought the case to the Supreme Court.

== Opinion of the court ==
The Supreme Court issued an opinion on November 23, 1926. The court said "The Court of Claims is a special tribunal established to hear and determine suits against the United States on claims of specified classes. Except as Congress has consented, there is no right to bring these suits against the United States, and therefore the right arising from the consent is subject to such restrictions as Congress has imposed." The opinion followed an earlier case, The Francis Wright (1881), in saying that Congress could limit appellate jurisdiction as it saw fit. Indeed, the Luckenbach court said that "the well settled rule applies that an appellate review is not essential to due process of law, but is a matter of grace."

== Later developments ==
In Glidden Co. v. Zdanok, the Supreme Court held that the Court of Claims was not a special tribunal—an Article I tribunal or a legislative court—after all. The court held there that the Court of Claims was actually an Article III constitutional court. The Court of Claims was abolished in 1982.
