= Vermont v. New Hampshire =

- Supreme Court of the United States

Argued April 20–21, 1933 Decided May 29, 1933
- Full case name: The State of Vermont v. The State of New Hampshire
- Citations: 289 U.S. 593 (more) 53 S. Ct. 708; 77 L. Ed. 1392

Case history
- Prior: Hearing upon exceptions to report of the Special Master

Holding
- The boundary between Vermont and New Hampshire is neither the thread of the channel of the Connecticut River nor the top of the west bank of the river, but rather the west bank of the river at the mean low-water mark.

Court membership
- Chief Justice Charles E. Hughes Associate Justices Willis Van Devanter · James C. McReynolds; Louis Brandeis · George Sutherland; Pierce Butler · Harlan F. Stone; Owen Roberts · Benjamin N. Cardozo

Case opinion
- Majority: Stone, joined by Van Devanter, McReynolds, Brandeis, Sutherland, Butler, Roberts, Cardozo
- Hughes took no part in the consideration or decision of the case.

Vermont v. New Hampshire, 289 U.S. 593 (1933), was a United States Supreme Court case holding that the boundary between Vermont and New Hampshire is neither the thread of the channel of the Connecticut River nor the top of the west bank of the river, but rather the west bank of the river at the mean low-water mark.

The petition adjudicate the dispute was submitted to the Supreme Court by the State of Vermont in 1915 and not finally decided until 18 years later. In the meantime, a special master appointed by the Court studied the 17th- and 18th-century history of laws and politics affecting the status of the territory that ultimately became the state of Vermont and wrote a lengthy report to the Court.

== History of the boundary dispute ==
An Order-in-Council signed by King George III on July 20, 1764, said that the boundary between New Hampshire and New York is the west bank of the river. The order was intended to settle a dispute between New York and New Hampshire in which each claimed the territory that later became the state of Vermont. The disputed territory had been governed for 15 years as a de facto part of New Hampshire, but the king's order awarded it to New York. On January 15, 1777, Vermont issued its declaration of independence, creating the independent Vermont Republic. On August 20 and 21, 1781, Congress expressed conditions that must be met before the then-still unrecognized but de facto independent state could be admitted into the Union. Among the conditions was that Vermont must give up its claims to territory east of the river. On February 22, 1782, Vermont's legislature complied, and the Supreme Court's opinion in 1933 cited that act.

== "Perambulation" by the two attorneys general ==
In order to assure compliance with the Supreme Court's ruling, in 1935 the legislatures of Vermont and New Hampshire enacted laws requiring the attorneys general of those two states to meet at the river once every seven years to reaffirm their mutual understanding of the location of the boundary.
