= National Mutual Insurance Co. v. Tidewater Transfer Co. =

National Mutual Insurance Company v. Tidewater Transfer Company
- Supreme Court of the United States

Argued November 8, 1948 Decided June 20, 1949
- Full case name: National Mutual Insurance Company v. Tidewater Transfer Company
- Citations: 337 U.S. 582 (more) 69 S. Ct. 1173; 93 L. Ed. 1556; 1949 U.S. LEXIS 2924

Holding
- 28 U.S.C. § 1332(d), treating citizens of United States territories as citizens of a state for the purpose of establishing diversity jurisdiction, is constitutional.

Court membership
- Chief Justice Fred M. Vinson Associate Justices Hugo Black · Stanley F. Reed; Felix Frankfurter · William O. Douglas; Frank Murphy · Robert H. Jackson; Wiley B. Rutledge · Harold H. Burton

Case opinions
- Plurality: Jackson, joined by Black, Burton
- Concurrence: Rutledge, joined by Murphy
- Dissent: Vinson, joined by Douglas
- Dissent: Frankfurter, joined by Reed

Laws applied
- 28 U.S.C. § 1332(d)

National Mutual Insurance Company v. Tidewater Transfer Company, 337 U.S. 582 (1949), was a United States Supreme Court case that upheld the constitutionality of 28 U.S.C. §1332(e). §1332(e) treats citizens of United States territories as citizens of a state for the purpose of establishing diversity jurisdiction.

This case superseded Hepburn v. Ellzey (1805).

== See also ==
- O'Donoghue v. United States
