= Hurn v. Oursler =

- Supreme Court of the United States

Argued February 17, 1933 Decided April 17, 1933
- Full case name: Hurn v. Oursler
- Citations: 289 U.S. 238 (more) 53 S. Ct. 586; 77 L. Ed. 1148

Holding
- A significant federal question raised by a suit can give jurisdiction to federal courts. If the federal question is rejected on the merits, the federal court still has jurisdiction to decide the local question on the merits.

Court membership
- Chief Justice Charles E. Hughes Associate Justices Willis Van Devanter · James C. McReynolds; Louis Brandeis · George Sutherland; Pierce Butler · Harlan F. Stone; Owen Roberts · Benjamin N. Cardozo

Case opinions
- Majority: Sutherland, joined by Hughes, Van Devanter, McReynolds, Butler, Roberts, Cardozo
- Concurrence: Brandeis, joined by Stone

Hurn v. Oursler, 289 U.S. 238 (1933), was a United States Supreme Court case in which the Court held that a significant federal question raised by a suit can give pendent jurisdiction to federal courts. If the federal question is rejected on the merits, the federal court still has jurisdiction to decide the local question on the merits.

This case was the first to recognize pendent jurisdiction. The court said that plaintiffs do not need to establish subject matter jurisdiction in the pre-existing ways because the two claims were the same cause of action. The court said that a state cause of action is the same as a federal cause when they "result from the same acts which constitute the [federal claim] and are inseparable therefrom."

The case being discussed was a copyright infringement suit.

In United States v. United States Gypsum Co., the Court's majority opinion referred to Hurn v. Oursler in passing. Justice Felix Frankfurter expanded this and recounted the case's background in his concurrence as a key point in his argument.
