= Industrial applicability =

Concept in patent law

In certain jurisdictions' patent law, industrial applicability or industrial application is a patentability requirement according to which a patent can only be granted for an invention which is susceptible of industrial application, i.e. for an invention which can be made or used in some kind of industry. In this context, the concept of "industry" is far-reaching: it includes agriculture, for instance. An example of invention which would not be susceptible of industrial application is "a method of contraception [...] to be applied in the private and personal sphere of a human being".

In United States patent law, the utility requirement is a more or less corresponding, but different, requirement.

== Jurisdictions ==
=== European Patent Convention ===
Under the European Patent Convention (EPC), the requirement that an invention must be susceptible of industrial application to be patentable means that the invention "can be made or used in any kind of industry, including agriculture". In decision T 870/04 it was held that the mere fact that a substance can be made in some way does not necessarily mean that the requirements of Article 57 EPC are fulfilled, unless there is also some "profitable use" for which the substance can be employed.

When an alleged invention does not comply with the generally accepted laws of physics, the industrial application is also lacking. In that case, the industrial application requirement is related to the requirement of sufficiency of disclosure, i.e. the requirement that a "patent application must disclose the invention in a manner sufficiently clear and complete for it to be carried out by a person skilled in the art".

Article 53(c) EPC excludes "methods for treatment of the human or animal body by surgery or therapy and diagnostic methods practised on the human or animal body" from patentability, because these methods are regarded as not susceptible of industrial application. The purpose of this exclusion is "to deny patent protection to methods which serve medical purposes, so that no one could be hampered in the practice of medicine by patent legislation."

== See also ==
- Incredible utility
