= List of United States Supreme Court cases, volume 289 =

Supreme Court of the United States
- Interactive map of Supreme Court of the United States
- 38°53′26″N 77°00′16″W
- Established: March 4, 1789; 237 years ago
- Location: Washington, D.C.
- Coordinates: 38°53′26″N 77°00′16″W
- Composition method: Presidential nomination with Senate confirmation
- Authorised by: Constitution of the United States, Art. III, § 1
- Judge term length: life tenure, subject to impeachment and removal
- Number of positions: 9 (by statute)
- Website: supremecourt.gov

This is a list of cases reported in volume 289 of United States Reports, decided by the Supreme Court of the United States in 1933.

== Justices of the Supreme Court at the time of volume 289 U.S. ==
The Supreme Court is established by Article III, Section 1 of the Constitution of the United States, which says: "The judicial Power of the United States, shall be vested in one supreme Court . . .". The size of the Court is not specified; the Constitution leaves it to Congress to set the number of justices. Under the Judiciary Act of 1789 Congress originally fixed the number of justices at six (one chief justice and five associate justices). Since 1789 Congress has varied the size of the Court from six to seven, nine, ten, and back to nine justices (always including one chief justice).

When the cases in volume 289 were decided the Court comprised the following nine members:

Portrait	Justice	Office	Home State	Succeeded	Date confirmed by the Senate (Vote)	Tenure on Supreme Court
	Charles Evans Hughes	Chief Justice	New York	William Howard Taft	February 13, 1930 (52–26)	February 24, 1930 – June 30, 1941 (Retired)
	Willis Van Devanter	Associate Justice	Wyoming	Edward Douglass White (as Associate Justice)	December 15, 1910 (Acclamation)	January 3, 1911 – June 2, 1937 (Retired)
	James Clark McReynolds	Associate Justice	Tennessee	Horace Harmon Lurton	August 29, 1914 (44–6)	October 12, 1914 – January 31, 1941 (Retired)
	Louis Brandeis	Associate Justice	Massachusetts	Joseph Rucker Lamar	June 1, 1916 (47–22)	June 5, 1916 – February 13, 1939 (Retired)
	George Sutherland	Associate Justice	Utah	John Hessin Clarke	September 5, 1922 (Acclamation)	October 2, 1922 – January 17, 1938 (Retired)
	Pierce Butler	Associate Justice	Minnesota	William R. Day	December 21, 1922 (61–8)	January 2, 1923 – November 16, 1939 (Died)
	Harlan F. Stone	Associate Justice	New York	Joseph McKenna	February 5, 1925 (71–6)	March 2, 1925 – July 2, 1941 (Continued as chief justice)
	Owen Roberts	Associate Justice	Pennsylvania	Edward Terry Sanford	May 20, 1930 (Acclamation)	June 2, 1930 – July 31, 1945 (Resigned)
	Benjamin N. Cardozo	Associate Justice	New York	Oliver Wendell Holmes Jr.	February 24, 1932 (Acclamation)	March 14, 1932 – July 9, 1938 (Died)

== Notable Case in 289 U.S. ==
=== Hurn v. Oursler ===
In Hurn v. Oursler, 289 U.S. 238 (1933), the Supreme Court held that a significant federal question raised in a lawsuit can give jurisdiction to federal courts; even if the federal question is rejected on the merits, the federal court still has jurisdiction to decide the local question on the merits.

== Federal court system ==
Under the Judiciary Act of 1789 the federal court structure at the time comprised District Courts, which had general trial jurisdiction; Circuit Courts, which had mixed trial and appellate (from the US District Courts) jurisdiction; and the United States Supreme Court, which had appellate jurisdiction over the federal District and Circuit courts—and for certain issues over state courts. The Supreme Court also had limited original jurisdiction (i.e., in which cases could be filed directly with the Supreme Court without first having been heard by a lower federal or state court). There were one or more federal District Courts and/or Circuit Courts in each state, territory, or other geographical region.

The Judiciary Act of 1891 created the United States Courts of Appeals and reassigned the jurisdiction of most routine appeals from the district and circuit courts to these appellate courts. The Act created nine new courts that were originally known as the "United States Circuit Courts of Appeals." The new courts had jurisdiction over most appeals of lower court decisions. The Supreme Court could review either legal issues that a court of appeals certified or decisions of court of appeals by writ of certiorari. On January 1, 1912, the effective date of the Judicial Code of 1911, the old Circuit Courts were abolished, with their remaining trial court jurisdiction transferred to the U.S. District Courts.

== List of cases in volume 289 U.S. ==
Case name	Citation	Opinion of the Court	Vote	Concurring opinion or statement	Dissenting opinion or statement	Procedural jurisdiction	Result
Clark v. United States	289 U.S. 1 (1933)	Cardozo	9–0	none	none	certiorari to the United States Court of Appeals for the Eighth Circuit (8th Cir.)	judgment affirmed
Anderson, Collector of Internal Revenue v. Wilson	289 U.S. 20 (1933)	Cardozo	9–0	none	none	certiorari to the United States Court of Appeals for the Second Circuit (2d Cir.)	judgment affirmed, and cause remanded
Bemis Brothers Bag Company v. United States	289 U.S. 28 (1933)	Cardozo	9–0	none	none	certiorari to the United States Court of Appeals for the Eighth Circuit (8th Cir.)	judgment reversed
Williams v. City of Baltimore	289 U.S. 36 (1933)	Cardozo	9–0	none	none	certiorari to the United States Court of Appeals for the Fourth Circuit (4th Cir.)	judgments reversed
University of Illinois v. United States	289 U.S. 48 (1933)	Hughes	9–0	none	none	certiorari to the United States Court of Customs and Patent Appeals (C.C.P.A.)	judgment affirmed
First National Bank of Shreveport v. Louisiana Tax Commission	289 U.S. 60 (1933)	Brandeis	9–0	none	none	appeal from the Louisiana Supreme Court (La.)	affirmed
Public Service Commission of Wisconsin v. Wisconsin Telephone Company	289 U.S. 67 (1933)	Hughes	9–0	none	none	appeal from the United States District Court for the Western District of Wisconsin (W.D. Wis.)	decree vacated, and cause remanded
Roberts v. Richland Irrigation District	289 U.S. 71 (1933)	McReynolds	8-0[a]	none	none	appeal from the Washington Supreme Court (Wash.)	judgment affirmed
St. Louis Southwestern Railway Company v. Missouri Pacific Railroad Company	289 U.S. 76 (1933)	Brandeis	9–0	none	none	certiorari to the Arkansas Supreme Court (Ark.)	judgment affirmed
Consolidated Textile Corporation v. Gregory	289 U.S. 85 (1933)	McReynolds	9–0	none	none	appeal from the Wisconsin Supreme Court (Wis.)	judgment reversed, and cause remanded
Rossi v. United States	289 U.S. 89 (1933)	McReynolds	9–0	none	none	certiorari to the United States Court of Appeals for the Seventh Circuit (7th Cir.)	judgment affirmed
C.A. Bradley d/b/a Wolverine Motor Freight Lines v. Public Utilities Commission of Ohio	289 U.S. 92 (1933)	Brandeis	9–0	none	none	appeal from the Ohio Supreme Court (Ohio)	judgment affirmed
Gant v. Oklahoma City	289 U.S. 98 (1933)	Sutherland	9–0	none	none	appeal from the Oklahoma Supreme Court (Okla.)	decree affirmed
Levering and Garrigues Company v. Morrin	289 U.S. 103 (1933)	Sutherland	9–0	none	none	certiorari to the United States Court of Appeals for the Second Circuit (2d Cir.)	decree affirmed
Lang v. Commissioner of Internal Revenue	289 U.S. 109 (1933)	Sutherland	9–0	none	none	certiorari to the United States Court of Appeals for the Fourth Circuit (4th Cir.)	decree affirmed
Moffat Tunnel League v. United States	289 U.S. 113 (1933)	Butler	9–0	none	none	appeal from the United States District Court for the District of Delaware (D. Del.)	judgment affirmed
Transit Commission v. United States	289 U.S. 121 (1933)	Butler	9–0	none	none	appeal from the United States District Court for the Southern District of New York (S.D.N.Y.)	judgment affirmed
Public Service Commission of Montana v. Great Northern Utilities Company	289 U.S. 130 (1933)	Butler	9–0	none	none	appeal from the United States District Court for the District of Montana (D. Mont.)	judgment reversed
United States v. Flores	289 U.S. 137 (1933)	Stone	9–0	none	none	appeal from the United States District Court for the Eastern District of Pennsylvania (E.D. Pa.)	judgment reversed
United States v. Burroughs and James Cannon, Jr.	289 U.S. 159 (1933)	Roberts	9–0	Cardozo (without opinion)	none	certified questions from the United States Court of Appeals for the District of Columbia (D.C. Cir.)	certified questions answered
Royal Indemnity Company v. American Bond and Mortgage Company	289 U.S. 165 (1933)	Roberts	9–0	none	none	certiorari to the United States Court of Appeals for the Seventh Circuit (7th Cir.)	judgments affirmed
Reinecke v. Smith	289 U.S. 172 (1933)	Roberts	9–0	none	none	certiorari to the United States Court of Appeals for the Seventh Circuit (7th Cir.)	judgment reversed
United States v. Dubilier Condenser Corporation	289 U.S. 178 (1933)	Roberts	6–3	none	Stone (opinion; with which Cardozo concurred); Hughes (opinion)	certiorari to the United States Court of Appeals for the Third Circuit (3d Cir.)	decrees affirmed
United States v. Darby	289 U.S. 224 (1933)	Cardozo	9–0	none	none	appeal from the United States District Court for the District of Maryland (D. Md.)	judgment reversed, and cause remanded
Buffum v. Peter Barceloux Company	289 U.S. 227 (1933)	Cardozo	9–0	none	none	certiorari to the United States Court of Appeals for the Ninth Circuit (9th Cir.)	decree reversed
Hurn v. Oursler	289 U.S. 238 (1933)	Sutherland	9–0	Brandeis and Stone think the decree should be affirmed without modification	none	certiorari to the United States Court of Appeals for the Second Circuit (2d Cir.)	decree modified in accordance with the foregoing opinion, and as modified, affirmed
Edelman, State Treasurer v. Boeing Air Transport, Inc.	289 U.S. 249 (1933)	Stone	8-0[b]	none	none	certiorari to the United States Court of Appeals for the Tenth Circuit (10th Cir.)	judgment reversed
Young v. Masci	289 U.S. 253 (1933)	Brandeis	9–0	none	none	appeal from the New Jersey Court of Errors and Appeals (N.J.)	judgment affirmed
American Car and Foundry Company v. Brassert	289 U.S. 261 (1933)	Hughes	9–0	none	none	certiorari to the United States Court of Appeals for the Seventh Circuit (7th Cir.)	judgment affirmed
Federal Radio Commission v. Nelson Brothers Bond and Mortgage Company	289 U.S. 266 (1933)	Hughes	9–0	none	none	certiorari to the United States Court of Appeals for the District of Columbia (D.C. Cir.)	judgment reversed, and cause remanded
Los Angeles Gas and Electric Corporation v. California Railroad Commission	289 U.S. 287 (1933)	Hughes	6-2[b]	none	Butler (opinion; joined by Sutherland)	appeal from the United States District Court for the Southern District of California (S.D. Cal.)	decree affirmed
Harrisonville v. W.S. Dickey Clay Manufacturing Company	289 U.S. 334 (1933)	Brandeis	9–0	none	none	certiorari to the United States Court of Appeals for the Eighth Circuit (8th Cir.)	judgment reversed
Gross v. Irving Trust Company	289 U.S. 342 (1933)	Sutherland	9–0	none	none	certiorari to the United States Court of Appeals for the Third Circuit (3d Cir.)	judgment affirmed
Mintz v. Baldwin, Commissioner of Agriculture and Markets of New York	289 U.S. 346 (1933)	Butler	9–0	none	none	appeal from the United States District Court for the Northern District of New York (N.D.N.Y.)	judgment affirmed
United States ex rel. Greathouse v. Dern, Secretary of War	289 U.S. 352 (1933)	Stone	9–0	none	none	certiorari to the United States Court of Appeals for the District of Columbia (D.C. Cir.)	judgment affirmed
Washington ex rel. Bond and Goodwin and Tucker, Inc. v. Superior Court of Washington for Spokane County	289 U.S. 361 (1933)	Roberts	9–0	none	none	appeal from the Washington Supreme Court (Wash.)	judgment affirmed
Daube v. United States	289 U.S. 367 (1933)	Cardozo	9–0	none	none	certiorari to the United States Court of Claims (Ct. Cl.)	judgment affirmed
George Moore Ice Cream Company v. Rose, Collector of Internal Revenue	289 U.S. 373 (1933)	Cardozo	9–0	none	none	certiorari to the United States Court of Appeals for the Fifth Circuit (5th Cir.)	judgment reversed
Interstate Commerce Commission v. United States ex rel. Campbell	289 U.S. 385 (1933)	Cardozo	9–0	none	none	certiorari to the United States Court of Appeals for the District of Columbia (D.C. Cir.)	judgment reversed
Wisconsin v. Illinois	289 U.S. 395 (1933)	Hughes	9–0	none	none	original	decree of special master revised
South Carolina v. Bailey	289 U.S. 412 (1933)	McReynolds	7–2	none	Brandeis and Butler (joint short statement)	certiorari to the North Carolina Supreme Court (N.C.)	judgment reversed, and cause remanded
United States ex rel. Volpe v. Smith, Director of Immigration	289 U.S. 422 (1933)	McReynolds	9–0	none	none	certiorari to the United States Court of Appeals for the Seventh Circuit (7th Cir.)	judgment affirmed
National Surety Company v. Coriell	289 U.S. 426 (1933)	Brandeis	9–0	none	none	certiorari to the United States Court of Appeals for the Second Circuit (2d Cir.)	judgment reversed, and cause remanded
Ohio v. Chattanooga Boiler and Tank Company	289 U.S. 439 (1933)	Brandeis	9–0	none	none	original	judgment for plaintiff
Ex parte La Prade	289 U.S. 444 (1933)	Butler	9–0	none	none	petition for writ of mandamus to the United States District Court for the District of Arizona (D. Ariz.)	mandamus granted
Bevan v. Krieger	289 U.S. 459 (1933)	Roberts	9–0	none	none	appeals from the Ohio Supreme Court (Ohio)	judgment affirmed in one case; appeals dismissed in two cases
Quercia v. United States	289 U.S. 466 (1933)	Hughes	9–0	none	none	certiorari to the United States Court of Appeals for the First Circuit (1st Cir.)	judgment reversed
Conrad, Rubin and Lesser v. Pender	289 U.S. 472 (1933)	Hughes	9–0	none	none	certiorari to the United States Court of Appeals for the Second Circuit (2d Cir.)	judgment affirmed
Johnson v. Manhattan Railway Company	289 U.S. 479 (1933)	VanDevanter	7-0[c][d]	Butler (without opinion)	none	certiorari to the United States Court of Appeals for the Second Circuit (2d Cir.)	decree affirmed
Leighton v. United States	289 U.S. 506 (1933)	McReynolds	9–0	none	none	certiorari to the United States Court of Appeals for the Ninth Circuit (9th Cir.)	judgment affirmed
Ickes, Secretary of the Interior v. United States ex rel. Chestatee Pyrites and Chemical Company	289 U.S. 510 (1933)	Brandeis	9–0	none	none	certiorari to the United States Court of Appeals for the District of Columbia (D.C. Cir.)	judgment reversed
O'Donoghue v. United States	289 U.S. 516 (1933)	Sutherland	6–3	none	Hughes, VanDevanter, and Cardozo (joint opinion)	certified questions from the United States Court of Claims (Ct. Cl.)	certified questions answered
Williams v. United States	289 U.S. 553 (1933)	Sutherland	9–0	none	none	certified questions from the United States Court of Claims (Ct. Cl.)	certified questions answered
Rogers v. Hill	289 U.S. 582 (1933)	Butler	8-0[e]	none	none	certiorari to the United States Court of Appeals for the Second Circuit (2d Cir.)	judgment reversed, and cause remanded
Vermont v. New Hampshire	289 U.S. 593 (1933)	Stone	8-0[c]	none	none	original	boundary set
Tait, Collector of Internal Revenue v. Western Maryland Railroad Company	289 U.S. 620 (1933)	Roberts	9–0	none	none	certiorari to the United States Court of Appeals for the Fourth Circuit (4th Cir.)	judgment affirmed
Texas and Pacific Railroad Company v. United States	289 U.S. 627 (1933)	Roberts	5–4	none	Stone (opinion; with which Hughes, Brandeis, and Cardozo concurred)	appeal from the United States District Court for the Southern District of Texas (S.D. Tex.)	judgment reversed, and cause remanded
Burnet, Commissioner of Internal Revenue v. Wells	289 U.S. 670 (1933)	Cardozo	5–4	none	Sutherland (opinion; with which VanDevanter, McReynolds, and Butler concurred)	certiorari to the United States Court of Appeals for the Eighth Circuit (8th Cir.)	judgment reversed
DuPont v. Commissioner of Internal Revenue	289 U.S. 685 (1933)	Cardozo	9–0	VanDevanter, McReynolds, Sutherland, and Butler (joint short statement)	none	certiorari to the United States Court of Appeals for the Third Circuit (3d Cir.)	judgment affirmed
Sinclair Refining Company v. Jenkins Petroleum Process Company	289 U.S. 689 (1933)	Cardozo	9–0	none	none	certiorari to the United States Court of Appeals for the First Circuit (1st Cir.)	decrees affirmed

[a] Sutherland took no part in the case
[b] VanDevanter took no part in the case
[c] Hughes took no part in the case
[d] Brandeis took no part in the case
[e] Roberts took no part in the case
