= Lambert v. Yellowley =

- Supreme Court of the United States

Argued April 30, 1926 Decided November 29, 1926
- Full case name: Samuel W. Lambert vs. Edward C. Yellowley, et al.
- Citations: 272 U.S. 581 (more) 47 S. Ct. 210; 71 L. Ed. 422

Case history
- Prior: 291 F. 640 (S.D.N.Y. 1923); reversed, 4 F.2d 915 (2d Cir. 1924).

Holding
- The right to practice medicine does not trump the police power of States, or the power of Congress to enact laws that are "necessary and proper" for upholding the intent of the 18th Amendment.

Court membership
- Chief Justice William H. Taft Associate Justices Oliver W. Holmes Jr. · Willis Van Devanter; James C. McReynolds · Louis Brandeis; George Sutherland · Pierce Butler; Edward T. Sanford · Harlan F. Stone

Case opinions
- Majority: Brandeis, joined by Taft, Holmes, Van Devanter, Sanford
- Dissent: Sutherland, joined by McReynolds, Butler, Stone

Laws applied
- National Prohibition Act, Necessary and Proper Clause of the U.S. Const.

Lambert v. Yellowley, 272 U.S. 581 (1926), was a decision by the Supreme Court of the United States that reaffirmed the National Prohibition Act's limitation on the dispensation of alcoholic medicines. The five-to-four decision, written by Justice Louis D. Brandeis, affirmed the dismissal of a suit in which New York City physician Samuel Lambert sought to prevent Edward Yellowley, the acting federal prohibition director, from enforcing the Prohibition Act so as to preclude him from prescribing alcoholic medicines. The decision affirmed the police powers of the individual states, as well as the power of the Necessary and Proper Clause of the United States Constitution, which was cited in upholding the Prohibition Act's limitations as a necessary and proper implementation of the Eighteenth Amendment to the United States Constitution.

== Background ==
The Eighteenth Amendment, which made illegal in the United States the production, transport and sale of alcohol, went into effect on January 17, 1920. Accompanying legislation under the National Prohibition Act stated that physicians with appropriate permits could prescribe alcoholic medicines, but not more than once every 10 days to the same patient.

In November 1922, Lambert brought suit in federal court to prevent Yellowley and other officials from interfering with him prescribing liquors to his patients in excess of those allowed under the act, claiming that prescribing liquors more frequently than once every 10 days was sometimes necessary for treating patients, and that the ability to do so was a part of his rights as a physician.

In May 1923, the district court issued an injunction for Lambert, which was overturned by the U.S. Court of Appeals for the Second Circuit in December 1924. Lambert's appeal contended that in passing the disputed provision of the National Prohibition Act, Congress exceeded the authority granted by the Eighteenth Amendment, and that the provision was thus unconstitutional.

== Decision ==
In ruling against Lambert, the court rejected his claim that the prescription of medicinal liquors was unrelated to the enforcement of the Eighteenth Amendment, stating that such prescriptions opened the door to "frauds, subterfuges and artifices" that hampered enforcement of the amendment.

The court also rejected a right to practice medicine that trumped police power in the United States, or the right of Congress to enact laws that are necessary and proper for fulfilling the intent of the 18th Amendment:

There is no right to practice medicine which is not subordinate to the police power of the States, and also to the power of Congress to make laws necessary and proper for carrying into execution the Eighteenth Amendment. When the United States exerts any of the powers conferred upon it by the Constitution, no valid objection can be based upon the fact that such exercise may be attended by some or all of the incidents which attend the exercise by a State of its police power. The Eighteenth Amendment confers upon the Federal Government the power to prohibit the sale of intoxicating liquor for beverage purposes. Under it, as under the "necessary and proper" clause of Article I, § 8 of the Constitution, Congress has power to enforce prohibition "by appropriate legislation."

Four Justices dissented, in an opinion authored by Justice George Sutherland. The dissent focused on the wording of the 18th Amendment, which provided that "... the manufacture, sale or transportation of intoxicating liquors ... for beverage purposes is hereby prohibited." In his view, the amendment left any regulation of liquor sales other than "for beverage purposes" to state law.

== Later history ==
The ruling was later cited in cases upholding state prohibitions on birth control, such as in Commonwealth v. Gardner (1938), where the Supreme Court unanimously upheld Massachusetts' complete ban on contraceptives, rejecting claims that physicians should be able to prescribe contraceptives to patients in order to save their lives or protect their well-being, and declaring that physicians should not in any way be excepted from enforcement of the statute.

Connecticut's contraception ban was similarly upheld by the Connecticut Supreme Court in State v. Nelson (1940), which also cited Lambert in its ruling. As in Massachusetts, the court recalled Lambert in saying such laws were "a legitimate exercise of the state's police power to preserve and protect public morals."

More recently, Lambert has been cited in Supreme Court cases by justices arguing for the legitimacy of state laws banning late term abortions.
