= List of United States Supreme Court cases, volume 272 =

Supreme Court of the United States
- Interactive map of Supreme Court of the United States
- 38°53′26″N 77°00′16″W
- Established: March 4, 1789; 237 years ago
- Location: Washington, D.C.
- Coordinates: 38°53′26″N 77°00′16″W
- Composition method: Presidential nomination with Senate confirmation
- Authorised by: Constitution of the United States, Art. III, § 1
- Judge term length: life tenure, subject to impeachment and removal
- Number of positions: 9 (by statute)
- Website: supremecourt.gov

This is a list of cases reported in volume 272 of United States Reports, decided by the Supreme Court of the United States in 1926 and 1927.

== Justices of the Supreme Court at the time of volume 272 U.S. ==
The Supreme Court is established by Article III, Section 1 of the Constitution of the United States, which says: "The judicial Power of the United States, shall be vested in one supreme Court . . .". The size of the Court is not specified; the Constitution leaves it to Congress to set the number of justices. Under the Judiciary Act of 1789 Congress originally fixed the number of justices at six (one chief justice and five associate justices). Since 1789 Congress has varied the size of the Court from six to seven, nine, ten, and back to nine justices (always including one chief justice).

When the cases in volume 272 were decided the Court comprised the following nine members:

Portrait	Justice	Office	Home State	Succeeded	Date confirmed by the Senate (Vote)	Tenure on Supreme Court
	William Howard Taft	Chief Justice	Connecticut	Edward Douglass White	June 30, 1921 (Acclamation)	July 11, 1921 – February 3, 1930 (Retired)
	Oliver Wendell Holmes Jr.	Associate Justice	Massachusetts	Horace Gray	December 4, 1902 (Acclamation)	December 8, 1902 – January 12, 1932 (Retired)
	Willis Van Devanter	Associate Justice	Wyoming	Edward Douglass White (as Associate Justice)	December 15, 1910 (Acclamation)	January 3, 1911 – June 2, 1937 (Retired)
	James Clark McReynolds	Associate Justice	Tennessee	Horace Harmon Lurton	August 29, 1914 (44–6)	October 12, 1914 – January 31, 1941 (Retired)
	Louis Brandeis	Associate Justice	Massachusetts	Joseph Rucker Lamar	June 1, 1916 (47–22)	June 5, 1916 – February 13, 1939 (Retired)
	George Sutherland	Associate Justice	Utah	John Hessin Clarke	September 5, 1922 (Acclamation)	October 2, 1922 – January 17, 1938 (Retired)
	Pierce Butler	Associate Justice	Minnesota	William R. Day	December 21, 1922 (61–8)	January 2, 1923 – November 16, 1939 (Died)
	Edward Terry Sanford	Associate Justice	Tennessee	Mahlon Pitney	January 29, 1923 (Acclamation)	February 19, 1923 – March 8, 1930 (Died)
	Harlan F. Stone	Associate Justice	New York	Joseph McKenna	February 5, 1925 (71–6)	March 2, 1925 – July 2, 1941 (Continued as chief justice)

== Notable Cases in 272 U.S. ==
=== Myers v. United States ===
In Myers v. United States, 272 U.S. 52 (1926), the Supreme Court held that the President has the exclusive power to remove executive branch officials, and does not need the approval of the Senate or any other legislative body. It was distinguished in 1935 by Humphrey's Executor v. United States. In Seila Law LLC v. Consumer Financial Protection Bureau (2020), however, the Supreme Court interpreted Myers as establishing that the President generally has unencumbered removal power. Myers was the first Supreme Court case to address the President's removal powers.

=== Village of Euclid v. Ambler Realty Co. ===
Village of Euclid v. Ambler Realty Co., 272 U.S. 365 (1926), is a landmark Supreme Court decision approving the power of local government to establish rules of zoning. The Court's ruling that local ordinance zoning is a valid exercise of the police power bolstered zoning in the United States and influenced other countries. At the time of Euclid, zoning was a relatively new concept, and there had been complaints that it was an unreasonable intrusion into private property rights for a government to restrict how an owner might use property. The Court, in holding that there was valid government interest in maintaining the character of a neighborhood and in regulating where certain land uses should occur, allowed for the subsequent explosion in zoning ordinances across the country. The Court has never heard a case seeking to overturn Euclid. Today most local governments in the United States have zoning ordinances.

=== Lambert v. Yellowley ===
In Lambert v. Yellowley, 272 U.S. 581 (1926), the Supreme Court reaffirmed the National Prohibition Act's limitation on the dispensation of alcoholic medicines. The Court affirmed dismissal of a suit in which New York City physician Samuel Lambert sought to prevent Edward Yellowley, the acting federal prohibition director, from enforcing the Prohibition Act so as to preclude Lambert from prescribing alcoholic medicines. The decision strengthened the police powers of the individual states, and clarified the Necessary and Proper Clause of the United States Constitution, which was cited in upholding the Prohibition Act's limitations as a necessary and proper implementation of the Eighteenth Amendment to the United States Constitution.

== Citation style ==
Under the Judiciary Act of 1789 the federal court structure at the time comprised District Courts, which had general trial jurisdiction; Circuit Courts, which had mixed trial and appellate (from the US District Courts) jurisdiction; and the United States Supreme Court, which had appellate jurisdiction over the federal District and Circuit courts—and for certain issues over state courts. The Supreme Court also had limited original jurisdiction (i.e., in which cases could be filed directly with the Supreme Court without first having been heard by a lower federal or state court). There were one or more federal District Courts and/or Circuit Courts in each state, territory, or other geographical region.

The Judiciary Act of 1891 created the United States Courts of Appeals and reassigned the jurisdiction of most routine appeals from the district and circuit courts to these appellate courts. The Act created nine new courts that were originally known as the "United States Circuit Courts of Appeals." The new courts had jurisdiction over most appeals of lower court decisions. The Supreme Court could review either legal issues that a court of appeals certified or decisions of court of appeals by writ of certiorari. On January 1, 1912, the effective date of the Judicial Code of 1911, the old Circuit Courts were abolished, with their remaining trial court jurisdiction transferred to the U.S. District Courts.

Bluebook citation style is used for case names, citations, and jurisdictions.

- "# Cir." = United States Court of Appeals
  - e.g., "3d Cir." = United States Court of Appeals for the Third Circuit
- "D." = United States District Court for the District of . . .
  - e.g.,"D. Mass." = United States District Court for the District of Massachusetts
- "E." = Eastern; "M." = Middle; "N." = Northern; "S." = Southern; "W." = Western
  - e.g.,"M.D. Ala." = United States District Court for the Middle District of Alabama
- "Ct. Cl." = United States Court of Claims
- The abbreviation of a state's name alone indicates the highest appellate court in that state's judiciary at the time.
  - e.g.,"Pa." = Supreme Court of Pennsylvania
  - e.g.,"Me." = Supreme Judicial Court of Maine

== List of cases in volume 272 U.S. ==
Case Name	Page and year	Opinion of the Court	Concurring opinion(s)	Dissenting opinion(s)	Lower Court	Disposition
United States v. Chemical Foundation, Inc.	1 (1926)	Butler	none	none	3d Cir.	affirmed
Oklahoma v. Texas	21 (1926)	Sanford	none	none	original	boundary set
International Stevedoring Company v. Haverty	50 (1926)	Holmes	none	none	Wash.	affirmed
Myers v. United States	52 (1926)	Taft	none	Holmes; McReynolds; Brandeis	Ct. Cl.	affirmed
Palmetto Fire Insurance Company v. Conn	295 (1926)	Holmes	none	none	S.D. Ohio	affirmed
Dorchy v. Kansas	306 (1926)	Brandeis	none	none	Kan.	affirmed
Hebert v. Louisiana	312 (1926)	VanDevanter	none	none	La.	affirmed
Moore v. Fidelity and Deposit Company	317 (1926)	Brandeis	none	none	D. Or.	dismissed
United States v. One Ford Coupe Automobile	321 (1926)	Brandeis	Stone	Butler	5th Cir.	reversed
Yankton Sioux Tribe of Indians v. United States	351 (1926)	Sutherland	none	none	Ct. Cl.	reversed
Anderson v. Shipowners Association of the Pacific Coast	359 (1926)	Sutherland	none	none	9th Cir.	reversed
Village of Euclid v. Ambler Realty Company	365 (1926)	Sutherland	none	none	N.D. Ohio	reversed
Michigan v. Wisconsin	398 (1926)	Sutherland	none	none	original	boundary set
McCardle v. Indianapolis Water Company	400 (1926)	Butler	none	Brandeis	D. Ind.	affirmed
Graves v. Minnesota	425 (1926)	Sanford	none	none	Minn.	affirmed
I.T.S. Rubber Company v. Essex Rubber Company	429 (1926)	Sanford	none	none	1st Cir.	affirmed
Southern Pacific Company v. United States	445 (1926)	Stone	none	none	Ct. Cl.	affirmed
Brasfield v. United States	448 (1926)	Stone	none	none	9th Cir.	reversed
Hudson v. United States	451 (1926)	Stone	none	none	3d Cir.	affirmed
United States v. New York Central Railroad Company	457 (1926)	Stone	none	none	N.D.N.Y.	reversed
Van Oster v. Kansas	465 (1926)	Stone	none	none	Kan.	affirmed
Hughes Brothers Timber Company v. Minnesota	469 (1926)	Taft	none	none	Minn.	reversed
United States v. General Electric Company	476 (1926)	Taft	none	none	N.D. Ohio	affirmed
Hanover Fire Insurance Company v. Harding	494 (1926)	Taft	none	none	Ill.	reversed
Deutsche Bank Filiale Nurnberg v. Humphrey	517 (1926)	Holmes	none	Sutherland	9th Cir.	reversed
Massachusetts State Grange v. Benton	525 (1926)	Holmes	none	McReynolds	D. Mass.	affirmed
Dodge v. United States	530 (1926)	Holmes	none	none	1st Cir.	affirmed
Luckenbach Steamship Company v. United States	533 (1926)	VanDevanter	none	none	Ct. Cl.	affirmed
Salinger v. United States	542 (1926)	VanDevanter	none	none	D.S.D.	transfer to 8th Cir.
United States v. Brims	549 (1926)	McReynolds	none	none	7th Cir.	reversed
Federal Trade Commission v. Western Meat Company	554 (1926)	McReynolds	none	Brandeis	7th Cir.	multiple
Port Gardner Investment Company v. United States	564 (1926)	Brandeis	Butler	none	9th Cir.	certification
Wachovia Bank and Trust Company v. Doughton	567 (1926)	McReynolds	none	Holmes	N.C.	reversed
Ottinger, Attorney General of New York v. Consolidated Gas Company of New York	576 (1926)	McReynolds	none	none	S.D.N.Y.	affirmed
Ottinger, Attorney General of New York v. Brooklyn Union Gas Company	579 (1926)	McReynolds	none	none	E.D.N.Y.	affirmed
Lambert v. Yellowley	581 (1926)	Brandeis	none	Sutherland	2d Cir.	affirmed
Napier v. Atlantic Coast Line Railroad Company	605 (1926)	Brandeis	none	none	N.D. Ga.	multiple
Duffy v. Mutual Benefit Life Insurance Company	613 (1926)	Sutherland	none	none	3d Cir.	affirmed
Fasulo v. United States	620 (1926)	Butler	none	none	9th Cir.	reversed
Murphy v. United States	630 (1926)	Holmes	none	none	3d Cir.	certification
United States v. McElvain	633 (1926)	Butler	none	none	N.D. Ill.	affirmed
Wright v. Ynchausti and Company	640 (1926)	Taft	none	none	Phil.	affirmed
United States v. Storrs	652 (1926)	Holmes	none	none	D. Utah	dismissed
Dysart v. United States	655 (1926)	McReynolds	none	none	5th Cir.	reversed
Virginian Railway Company v. United States	658 (1926)	Brandeis	none	none	S.D.W. Va.	multiple
Eastern Transportation Company v. United States	675 (1927)	Taft	none	none	W.D. Va.	reversed
Postum Cereal Company v. California Fig Nut Company	693 (1927)	Taft	none	none	D.C. Cir.	dismissed
A proceeding in the Court of Appeals of the District of Columbia under § 9 of the Trade-Mark Act of 1905 to review a decision of the Commissioner of Patents refusing to cancel the registration of a trademark, is an administrative matter, and not a "case" within the meaning of Article III of the Constitution.
Los Angeles Brush Manufacturing Corporation v. James	701 (1927)	Taft	none	none	S.D. Cal.	mandamus denied
Emmons Coal Mining Company v. Norfolk and Western Railroad Company	709 (1927)	Holmes	none	none	3d Cir.	affirmed
Miller v. City of Milwaukee	713 (1927)	Holmes	Brandeis	none	E.D. Wis.	reversed
Steamship Willdomino v. Citro Chemical Company	718 (1927)	McReynolds	none	none	3d Cir.	affirmed
Garland's Heirs v. Choctaw Nation	728 (1927)	McReynolds	none	none	Ct. Cl.	affirmed
De la Mettrie v. De Gasquet James	731 (1927)	McReynolds	none	none	D.C. Cir.	affirmed
United States v. Gettinger and Pomerantz	734 (1927)	McReynolds	none	none	N.D.N.Y.	reversed
