= Incredible utility =

United States patent law concept

In United States patent law, incredible utility is a concept according to which, in order for an invention to be patentable, it must have some credible useful function. If it does not have a credible useful function despite the assertions of the inventor, the patent application can be rejected as having "incredible utility". The invention does not have to work the way the inventor thinks it works, but it must do something useful. Patents that have been held invalid for incredible utility include:

- an invention asserted to change the taste of food using a magnetic field (Fregeau v. Mossinghoff, 776 F.2d 1034, 227 USPQ 848 (Fed. Cir. 1985)),
- a perpetual motion machine (Newman v. Quigg, 877 F.2d 1575, 11 USPQ2d 1340 (Fed. Cir. 1989)),
- a flying machine operating on "flapping or flutter function" (In re Houghton, 433 F.2d 820, 167 USPQ 687 (CCPA 1970)),
- a cold fusion process for producing energy (In re Swartz, 232 F.3d 862, 56 USPQ2d 1703, (Fed. Cir. 2000)),
- a method for increasing the energy output of fossil fuels upon combustion through exposure to a magnetic field (In re Ruskin, 354 F.2d 395, 148 USPQ 221 (CCPA 1966)),
- uncharacterized compositions for curing a wide array of cancers (In re Citron, 325 F.2d 248, 139 USPQ 516 (CCPA 1963)), and
- a method of controlling the aging process (In re Eltgroth, 419 F.2d 918, 164 USPQ 221 (CCPA 1970)).

A rejection based on incredible utility can be overcome by providing evidence that, "if, considered as a whole, [...] leads a person of ordinary skill in the art to conclude that the asserted utility is more likely than not true".

== See also ==
- Industrial applicability
- Sufficiency of disclosure
