= Ex parte Bakelite Corp. =

- Supreme Court of the United States

Decided May 20, 1929
- Full case name: Ex parte Bakelite Corp.
- Citations: 279 U.S. 438 (more)

Holding
- The United States Court of Customs and Patent Appeals was an Article I tribunal.

Court membership
- Chief Justice William H. Taft Associate Justices Oliver W. Holmes Jr. · Willis Van Devanter; James C. McReynolds · Louis Brandeis; George Sutherland · Pierce Butler; Edward T. Sanford · Harlan F. Stone

Case opinion
- Majority: Van Devanter, joined by unanimous
- Overruled by
- Glidden Co. v. Zdanok

Ex parte Bakelite Corp., 279 U.S. 438 (1929), was a United States Supreme Court case in which the court held that the United States Court of Customs and Patent Appeals (CCPA) was an Article I tribunal. In 1962, the Supreme Court overruled Bakelite in Glidden Co. v. Zdanok (1962), holding that this court is an Article III court.

== Background ==
Bakelite argued using a writ of prohibition that the CCPA could not constitutionally hear an appeal from the Tariff Commission's findings about the improper importation methods of Bakelite's competitors. Bakelite asserted that the findings were not a "case or controversy" within the meaning of Article III and that the CCPA, being an Article III court, could not hear it for lack of jurisdiction.

== Opinion of the court ==
The Supreme Court issued an opinion on May 20, 1929. By holding that the CCPA was an Article I court, it avoided the question of whether this case was about a "case or controversy" entirely; that part of the Constitution is irrelevant to Article I tribunals. The court could hear this appeal because Congress gave it the authority to do so in its authorizing statute.

== Later developments ==
The Supreme Court followed Bakelite when it declared that the United States Court of Claims was an Article I tribunal in Williams v. United States. It overruled these decisions in Glidden Co. v. Zdanok, which characterized these courts as Article III courts.

=== Are there any Article III cases that Article I tribunals cannot hear? ===
An active question is exemplified by the division between Bakelite and Williams: Are there any "inherently judicial" cases within Article III jurisdiction that Article I tribunals cannot consider? This question is of concern to scholars because, if there are not, then it is possible for the legislative branch to place any issue before courts where the judges do not have the protections of Article III. To the extent that these protections "protect" judicial independence, that independence could be obviated away. This question has been addressed in part by the Supreme Court's dichotomy between "public rights" and "private rights." Private rights are inherently judicial, but Article III is satisfied if an Article I tribunal decides the case when there is a right of appeal to an Article III court. This doctrine is famously unclear.

In Stern v. Marshall (2011), the court said that bankruptcy courts (which are Article I tribunals) could not make a final determination on a debtor's claim that was based purely on state law because it affected public rights. However, the court did not strip the authority of the Article I tribunal to hear these sorts of issues, now called Stern claims. The court allowed bankruptcy courts to continue making judgments, created an appeal as of right to an Article III district court, and said that arrangement satisfied Article III. In Wellness International Network, Ltd. v. Sharif (2015), the court even confirmed that the tribunals could enter final judgement on these matters with the parties' consent. Stern and its significance have been criticized for being extremely opaque and based on a too-formalistic understanding of the issues with this question.
