= Brenner v. Manson =

- Supreme Court of the United States

Argued November 17, 1965 Decided March 21, 1966
- Full case name: Brenner, Commissioner of Patents v. Manson
- Citations: 383 U.S. 519 (more) 86 S. Ct. 1033; 16 L. Ed. 2d 69; 1966 U.S. LEXIS 2907; 148 U.S.P.Q. (BNA) 689

Case history
- Prior: In re Manson, 333 F.2d 234 (C.C.P.A. 1964); cert. granted, 380 U.S. 971 (1965).

Court membership
- Chief Justice Earl Warren Associate Justices Hugo Black · William O. Douglas; Tom C. Clark · John M. Harlan II; William J. Brennan Jr. · Potter Stewart; Byron White · Abe Fortas

Case opinions
- Majority: Fortas, joined by Warren, Black, Clark, Brennan, Stewart, White
- Dissent: Harlan, joined by Douglas

Laws applied
- 35 U.S.C. § 101

Brenner v. Manson, 383 U.S. 519 (1966), was a decision of the United States Supreme Court in which the Court held that a novel process for making a known steroid did not satisfy the utility requirement, because the patent applicants did not show that the steroid served any practical function. The Court ruled that "a process patent in the chemical field, which has not been developed and pointed to the degree of specific utility, creates a monopoly of knowledge which should be granted only if clearly commanded by the statute." Practical or specific utility, so that a "specific benefit exists in currently available form" is thus the requirement for a claimed invention to qualify for a patent.

The case is known for the statement "a patent is not a hunting license."

== Appellate jurisdiction issue ==
The Manson case is the first in which the Court granted a writ of certiorari in an appeal of a patent office rejection of a patent application. For many years there had been uncertainty whether the United States Court of Customs and Patent Appeals (CCPA) was an Article III court, and thus one as to which the Supreme Court had certiorari jurisdiction.

For many years, almost until the eve of the Manson case, the Solicitor General had opposed petitions for certiorari by disappointed patent applicants on the basis that the CCPA was an Article I court to which the Supreme Court's certiorari jurisdiction did not extend. In Lurk v. United States, however, the Court held that judges of the CCPA (as well as those of the Court of Claims) were Article III judges. In the Manson case the Court expressly held, unanimously, that certiorari was available to review CCPA decisions.

This paved the way for the US Government to seek review in the Supreme Court of judgments of the CCPA (and its successor the Federal Circuit) reversing denials of patent applications, which it did beginning with Manson.

== Substantive patent law issue ==
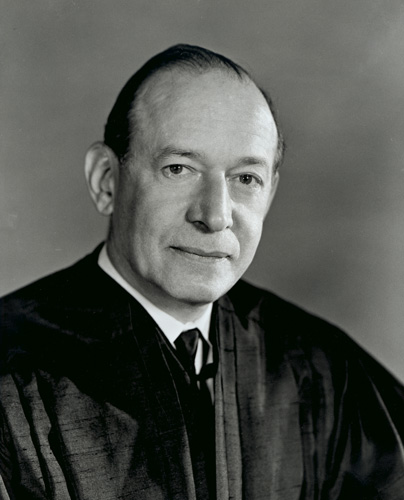
Justice Abe Fortas

Justice Abe Fortas delivered the unanimous opinion of the Court on the jurisdictional issue in this case and the 7–2 opinion of the Court on the issue of utility. Justice John Marshall Harlan II, joined by Justice William O. Douglas, dissented on the utility issue.

=== Majority opinion ===
The substantive patent law issue in the case was the degree of specific utility a claimed invention must have in order to qualify for patenting. Andrew Manson applied for a patent on a novel process for making a form of dihydrotestosterone, a known steroid chemical. A specific use for the product was not known or disclosed by Manson, although it was hypothesized that it could be screened for possible anti-cancer utility. Other steroids of similar chemical structure were known to inhibit tumors in mice. The Patent Office took the position that a process for making a known product could be patented only if the product had a known utility, while Manson argued, and the Court of Customs and Patent Appeals subsequently agreed, that it was sufficient for the process to be useful in making the product regardless of whether the product itself had any particular utility. The Patent Office refused to allow Manson to proceed. He appealed, and the Court of Customs and Patent Appeals reversed the Patent Office, saying that "where a claimed process produces a known product, it is not necessary to show utility for the product" so long as the product "is not alleged to be detrimental to the public interest." The Office then sought review in the Supreme Court.

The Supreme Court began by considering whether the fact that a closely related chemical had displayed anti-tumor activity in mice sufficed to satisfy the requirement in 35 U.S.C. § 101 that the subject matter of a patent must be "useful." The Court said it would not overturn the Office's finding that it did not follow from the mice data that the claimed process was useful, because whether the steroid product yielded by Manson's process would have similar tumor-inhibiting characteristics could not be assumed without proof, given the unpredictability of compounds in the steroid field. Nor was that the invention was not "harmful to society" sufficient. "There are, after all, many things in this world which may not be considered "useful" but which, nevertheless are totally without a capacity for harm."

Manson argued that allowing such claims as his would encourage disclosure, discourage secrecy, and promote efforts to make technological advances. The Court replied that a ’more compelling consideration" was that the monopoly so granted would discourage inventive activity by others:

[A] process patent in the chemical field, which has not been developed and pointed to the degree of specific utility, creates a monopoly of knowledge which should be granted only if clearly commanded by the statute. Until the process claim has been reduced to production of a product shown to be useful, the metes and bounds of that monopoly are not capable of precise delineation. It may engross a vast, unknown, and perhaps unknowable area. Such a patent may confer power to block off whole areas of scientific development, without compensating benefit to the public. The basic quid pro quo contemplated by the Constitution and the Congress for granting a patent monopoly is the benefit derived by the public from an invention with substantial utility. Unless and until a process is refined and developed to this point—where specific benefit exists in currently available form—there is insufficient justification for permitting an applicant to engross what may prove to be a broad field.

=== Dissent ===
In dissent, Justice Harlan argued that the result of the ruling might be to retard chemical progress:

What I find most troubling about the result reached by the Court is the impact it may have on chemical research. Chemistry is a highly interrelated field, and a tangible benefit for society may be the outcome of a number of different discoveries, one discovery building upon the next. To encourage one chemist or research facility to invent and disseminate new processes and products may be vital to progress, although the product or process be without "utility" as the Court defines the term, because that discovery permits someone else to take a further but perhaps less difficult step leading to a commercially useful item. In my view, our awareness in this age of the importance of achieving and publicizing basic research should lead this Court to resolve uncertainties in its favor, and uphold the respondent's position in this case.

=== Follow-up ===
Two relevant cases (In re Kirk and In re Joly) were decided by the court on the same day. and applied the Brenner standard.
