= Williams v. United States =

- Supreme Court of the United States

Decided May 29, 1933
- Full case name: Williams v. United States
- Citations: 289 U.S. 553 (more)

Holding
- The United States Court of Claims was an Article I tribunal.

Court membership
- Chief Justice Charles E. Hughes Associate Justices Willis Van Devanter · James C. McReynolds; Louis Brandeis · George Sutherland; Pierce Butler · Harlan F. Stone; Owen Roberts · Benjamin N. Cardozo

Case opinion
- Majority: Sutherland, joined by unanimous
- Overruled by
- Glidden Co. v. Zdanok (1962)

Williams v. United States, 289 U.S. 553 (1933), was a United States Supreme Court case in which the court held that the United States Court of Claims was an Article I tribunal. Because the Court of Claims was not an Article III court, Congress could lower its judges' wages without considering the Compensation Clause. In 1962, the Supreme Court overruled Williams in Glidden Co. v. Zdanok (1962), holding that this court is an Article III court.

== Background ==
This case was about whether the salaries of federal judges sitting on the United States Court of Claims could be reduced. The Compensation Clause of Article III protects Article III judges from this. However, not all federal judges sit on Article III courts. A judge who presides over an Article I tribunal has no such protection.

A few years earlier, in a similar case called Ex parte Bakelite Corp., the Supreme Court held that the United States Court of Customs and Patent Appeals was an Article I tribunal. In that case, the court essentially assumed that an Article I tribunal's jurisdiction simply followed the authorizing statute and that Congress could give them jurisdiction over issues considered by Article III courts.

== Opinion of the court ==
The Supreme Court issued an opinion on May 29, 1933. Like the court considered in Bakelite, the Supreme Court held that the Court of Claims was an Article I tribunal. However, unlike Bakelite, the Williams Court essentially assumed that Article I tribunals could not constitutionally consider issues within Article III jurisdiction. The court said that, because the Court of Claims only heard cases against the United States under a clause in Article I and did not consider Article III subject matter, it was a valid Article I tribunal. To avoid the part of Article III that said that "controversies to which the United States shall be a party" were within Article III jurisdiction, the court interpreted that clause as referring to cases where the United States was the plaintiff.

== Later developments ==
Critics of the Williams decision's logic described it as "strained."

After Bakelite and Williams, Congress passed resolutions to declare that the courts considered in these cases were established under Article III. In Glidden Co. v. Zdanok (1962), the Supreme Court recognized that these courts were Article III courts, overruling the two prior cases.

=== Are there any Article III cases that Article I tribunals cannot hear? ===
An active question is exemplified by the division between Bakelite and Williams: Are there any "inherently judicial" cases within Article III jurisdiction that Article I tribunals cannot consider? This question is of concern to scholars because, if there are not, then it is possible for the legislative branch to place any issue before courts where the judges do not have the protections of Article III. To the extent that these protections "protect" judicial independence, that independence could be obviated away. This question has been addressed in part by the Supreme Court's dichotomy between "public rights" and "private rights." Private rights are inherently judicial, but Article III is satisfied if an Article I tribunal decides the case when there is a right of appeal to an Article III court. This doctrine is famously unclear.

In Stern v. Marshall (2011), the court said that bankruptcy courts (which are Article I tribunals) could not make a final determination on a debtor's claim that was based purely on state law because it affected public rights. However, the court did not strip the authority of the Article I tribunal to hear these sorts of issues, now called Stern claims. The court allowed bankruptcy courts to continue making judgments, created an appeal as of right to an Article III district court, and said that arrangement satisfied Article III. In Wellness International Network, Ltd. v. Sharif (2015), the court even confirmed that the tribunals could enter final judgement on these matters with the parties' consent. Stern and its significance have been criticized for being extremely opaque and based on a too-formalistic understanding of the issues with this question.
