= William Winfield Scott =

American lawyer and historian (1855–1935)

William Winfield Scott (February 1855 in Pennsylvania – October 1, 1935 in New Jersey) was an American lawyer and the official historian of Passaic, New Jersey. Scott served on the Passaic city council and on the board of education of the Passaic City School District.
