= Glidden Co. v. Zdanok =

- Supreme Court of the United States

Argued February 21, 26, 1962 Decided June 25, 1962
- Full case name: Glidden Company v. Olga Zdanok, John Zacharczyk, Mary A. Hackett, Quitman Williams, and Marcelle Kreischer; Durkee Famous Foods Division, a Foreign Corporation and Benny Lurk v. United States
- Citations: 370 U.S. 530 (more) 82 S. Ct. 1459; 8 L. Ed. 2d 671; 1962 U.S. LEXIS 2139; 45 Lab. Cas. (CCH) ¶ 17,685; 50 L.R.R.M. 2693

Case history
- Prior: Summary judgment granted, Zdanok v. Glidden Co., Durkee Famous Foods Div., 185 F.Supp. 441 (S.D.N.Y. 1960); reversed, 288 F.2d 99 (2d Cir. 1961); on remand, 28 F.R.D. 346 (S.D.N.Y. 1961); cert. granted, 368 U.S. 814 (1961).; Lurk v. United States, 296 F.2d 360 (D.C. Cir. 1961); cert. granted, 368 U.S. 815 (1961).
- Subsequent: Rehearing denied, 371 U.S. 854 (1962).

Holding
- The Court of Claims and the Court of Customs and Patent Appeals are courts created under Article III of the Constitution and their judges are constitutionally protected in tenure and compensation, the designation of judges from those courts to sit on Courts of Appeals and United States District Courts was valid and judgments of the Court of Appeals and District Court were not vitiated by respective participation of such judges.

Court membership
- Chief Justice Earl Warren Associate Justices Hugo Black · Felix Frankfurter; William O. Douglas · Tom C. Clark; John M. Harlan II · William J. Brennan Jr. Potter Stewart · Byron White

Case opinions
- Plurality: Harlan, joined by Brennan, Stewart
- Concurrence: Clark, joined by Warren
- Dissent: Douglas, joined by Black
- Frankfurter and White took no part in the consideration or decision of the case.

Laws applied
- U.S. Const. Article III, §§ 1-2
- This case overturned a previous ruling or rulings
- Ex parte Bakelite Corp. (1929); Williams v. United States (1933)

Glidden Co. v. Zdanok (consolidated with Lurk v. United States), 370 U.S. 530 (1962), is a United States Supreme Court case in which the Court held that judges of the Court of Claims and the Court of Customs and Patent Appeals were judges created under Article III of the Constitution (also known as Article III judges). As such, it was permissible for the Chief Justice of the United States under 28 U.S.C. § 293(a) to designate judges from the Court of Claims and the Court of Customs and Patent Appeals to serve on district courts and courts of appeals.

== Background ==
In Ex parte Bakelite Corp. and Williams v. United States, the Court held that the United States Court of Customs and Patent Appeals and the United States Court of Claims were courts created under Article I of the Constitution. However, the U.S. Congress in 67 Stat. 226 (1953) and 72 Stat. 848 (1958), had indicated that the two courts were constituted under Article III of the Constitution. This distinction was important as judges of Article III courts are considered part of the independent judiciary as they are appointed for life and their salary cannot be decreased, which is in turn considered a requirement for the operation of judiciary as a separate branch of government. In the two cases at hand, judges from these courts had been assigned to courts of appeals and districts court by the Chief Justice of the United States as part of the task of balancing the workloads among the various courts. It was contended that these judges were judges of Article I courts and therefore could not adjudicate decisions on Article III courts. It was contended that the judgments of the Court of Claims had traditionally required Congressional appropriation to pay prevailing plaintiffs, because the Court of Claims issued advisory reports in response to matters referred to it by Congress under 28 U.S.C. § 1492, and because the Court of Customs and Patent Appeals could review certain administrative decisions of the Tariff Commission under 28 U.S.C. § 1543, that they there not truly independent as required by Article III.

== Opinion of the Court ==
In a plurality opinion, the Justice Harlan, writing for himself, Justice Brennan and Justice Stewart, held that Bakelite and Williams were decided incorrectly and that the courts had always been Article III courts and that the Congressional act of 1953 and 1958 confirmed that status. As such, it was permissible for judges from either court to be designated for service on courts of appeals and district courts and the decisions of the lower courts in this instance were valid. Justice Clark, writing for himself and the Chief Justice, concurred in the result, but concurred on the grounds that the 1953 and 1958 Acts made the courts Article III courts in light of the confusion that led to the Bakelite and Williams decisions, which were otherwise accurate. He found that the issues of Congressional reference cases under 28 U.S.C. § 1492 could be resolved by the Court of Claims declining future cases and that the Tariff Commission cases under 28 U.S.C. § 1543 were too insignificant to countermand the express Congressional intent of the 1958 act. Justice Douglas, writing for himself and Justice Black, dissented on the grounds that the courts were Article I courts and that the importance of an independent judiciary prevented non-Article III judges from deciding matters brought before Article III courts. The same confluence of practical considerations that dictated the result in Canter has governed the decision in later cases sanctioning the creation of other courts with judges of limited tenure. Tenure that is guaranteed by the Constitution is a badge of a judge of an Article III court. The argument that mere statutory tenure is sufficient for judges of Article III courts was authoritatively answered in Ex parte Bakelite Corp.:

... the argument is fallacious. It mistakenly assumes that whether a court is of one class or the other depends on the intention of Congress, whereas the true test lies in the power under which the court was created and in the jurisdiction conferred. Nor has there been any settled practice on the part of Congress which gives special significance to the absence or presence of a provision respecting the tenure of judges. This may be illustrated by two citations. The same Congress that created the Court of Customs Appeals made provision for five additional circuit judges and declared that they should hold their offices during good behavior; and yet the status of the judges was the same as it would have been had that declaration been omitted. In creating courts for some of the Territories Congress failed to include a provision fixing the tenure of the judges; but the courts became legislative courts just as if such a provision had been included.

In United States v. Coe, for example, the Court sustained the authority of the Court of Private Land Claims to adjudicate claims under treaties to land in the territories, but left it expressly open whether such a course might be followed within the States. Upon like considerations, Article III has been viewed as inapplicable to courts created in unincorporated territories outside the mainland, and to the consular courts established by concessions from foreign countries.

This Court, however is the expositor of the meaning of the Constitution ...

— Justice Harlan, Glidden Co. v. Zdanok, 370 U.S. 530, 602, 82 S.Ct. 1459, 1500 (1962)

The Court does great mischief in today's opinions. The opinion of my Brother Harlan stirs a host of problems that need not be opened. What is done will, I fear, plague us for years.

— Justice Douglas, Glidden Co. v. Zdanok, 370 U.S. 530, 606, n.11, 82 S.Ct. 1459, 1502, n.11 (1962)

== Subsequent developments ==
In response to this decision, Congress passed 80 Stat. 958 in 1966 which assigned Congressional reference cases from the Article III appellate division judges of the Court of Claims to the Article I trial division commissioners of the Court of Claims. This permitted the Court of Claims to resume hearing Congressional reference cases, which it had ceased accepting in light of Glidden. In 1982, as part of the Federal Courts Improvement Act, Congress passed 96 Stat. 25, which removed the ability to designate judges from the new Article I Claims Court for use on Article III courts.

Despite the reasoning's status as a plurality opinion, meaning its result is clear but not its precedential value, the case remains a defining case in the distinctions between Article I and Article III courts. Further, the need to retain Congressional reference jurisdiction was a reason that the Claims Court was specifically designated an Article I court by Congress in 1982.

== See also ==
- Postum Cereal Co. v. California Fig Nut Co., a case that Glidden acknowledged as obsolete
- O'Donoghue v. United States
